= São Mateus, Espírito Santo =

São Mateus
- Municipality
- Municipality of São Mateus
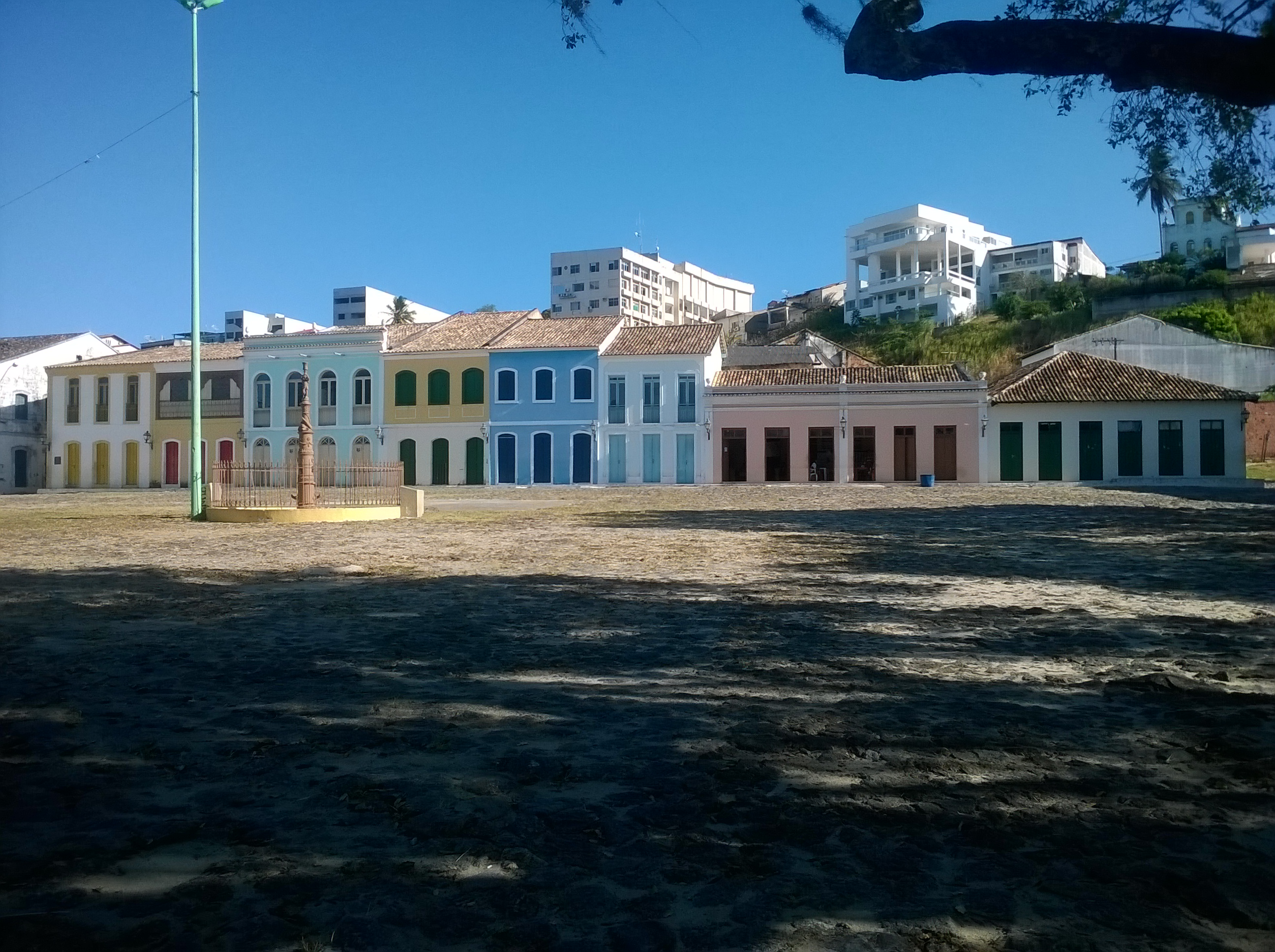
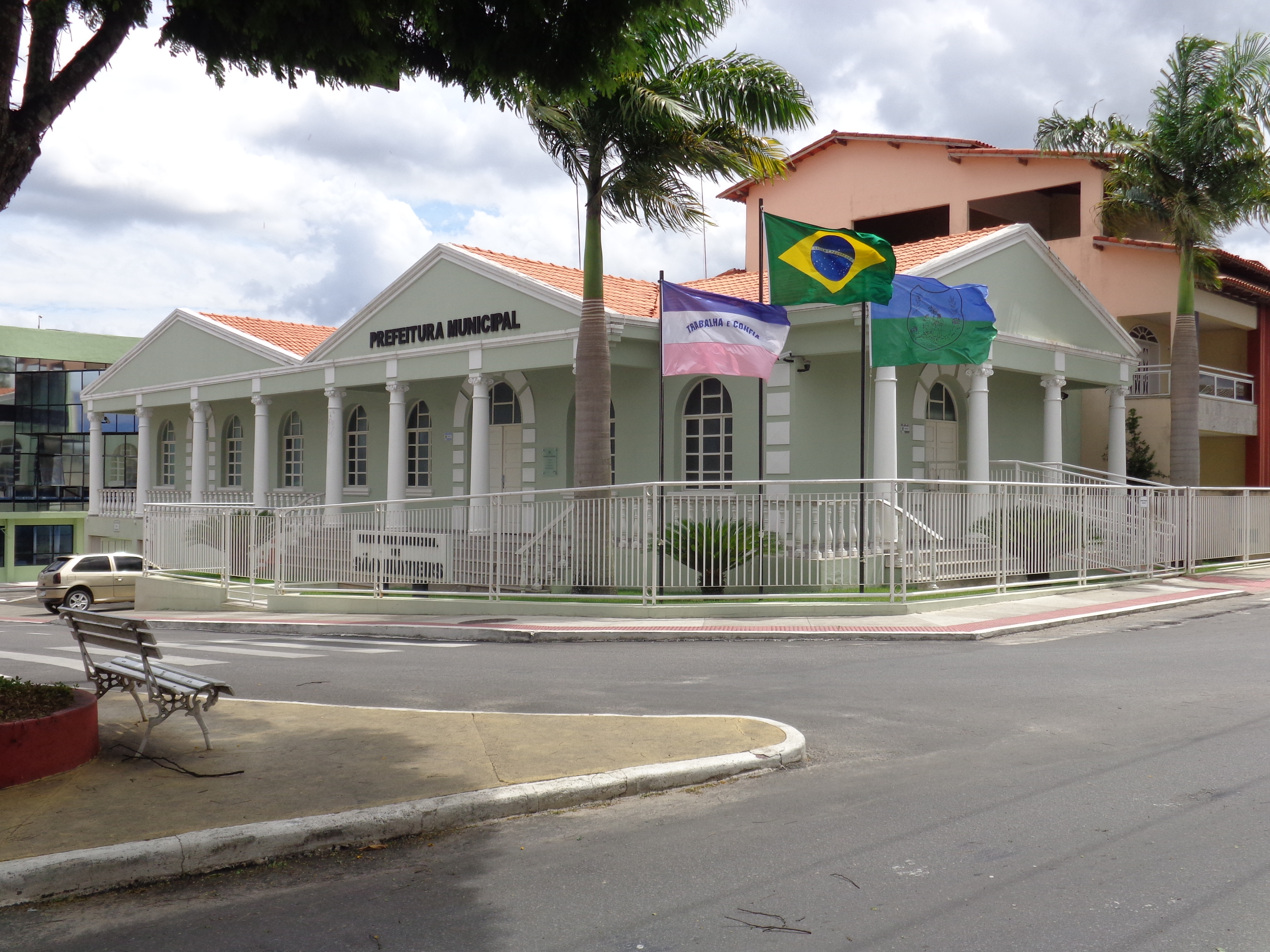
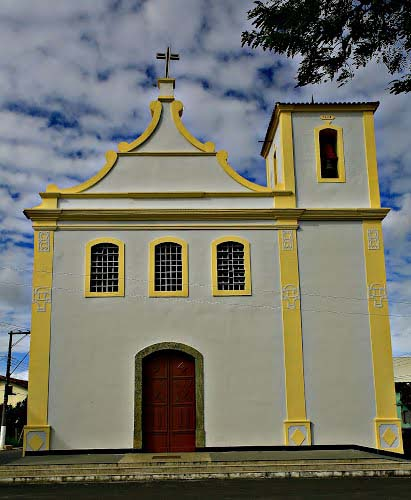
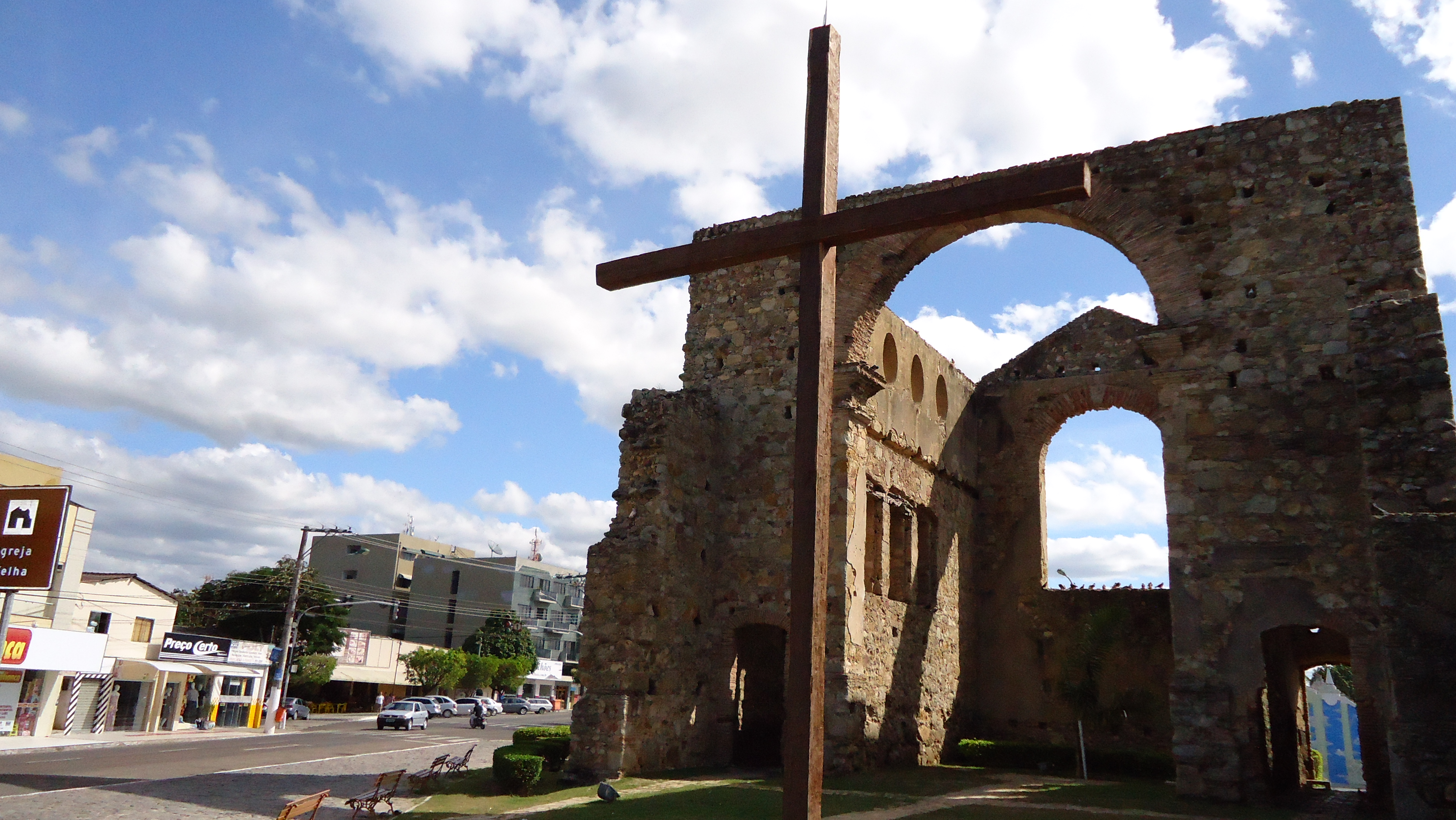
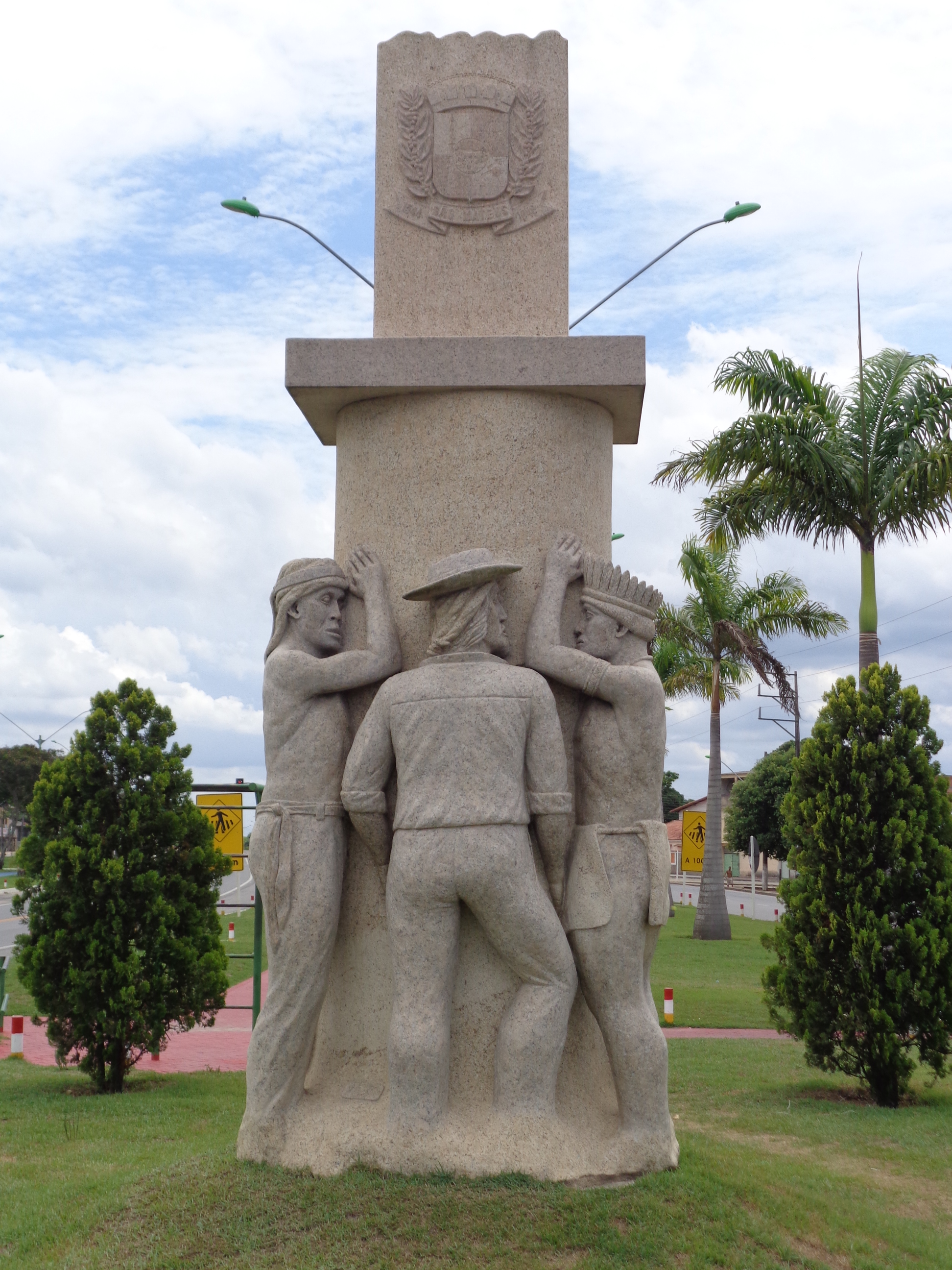
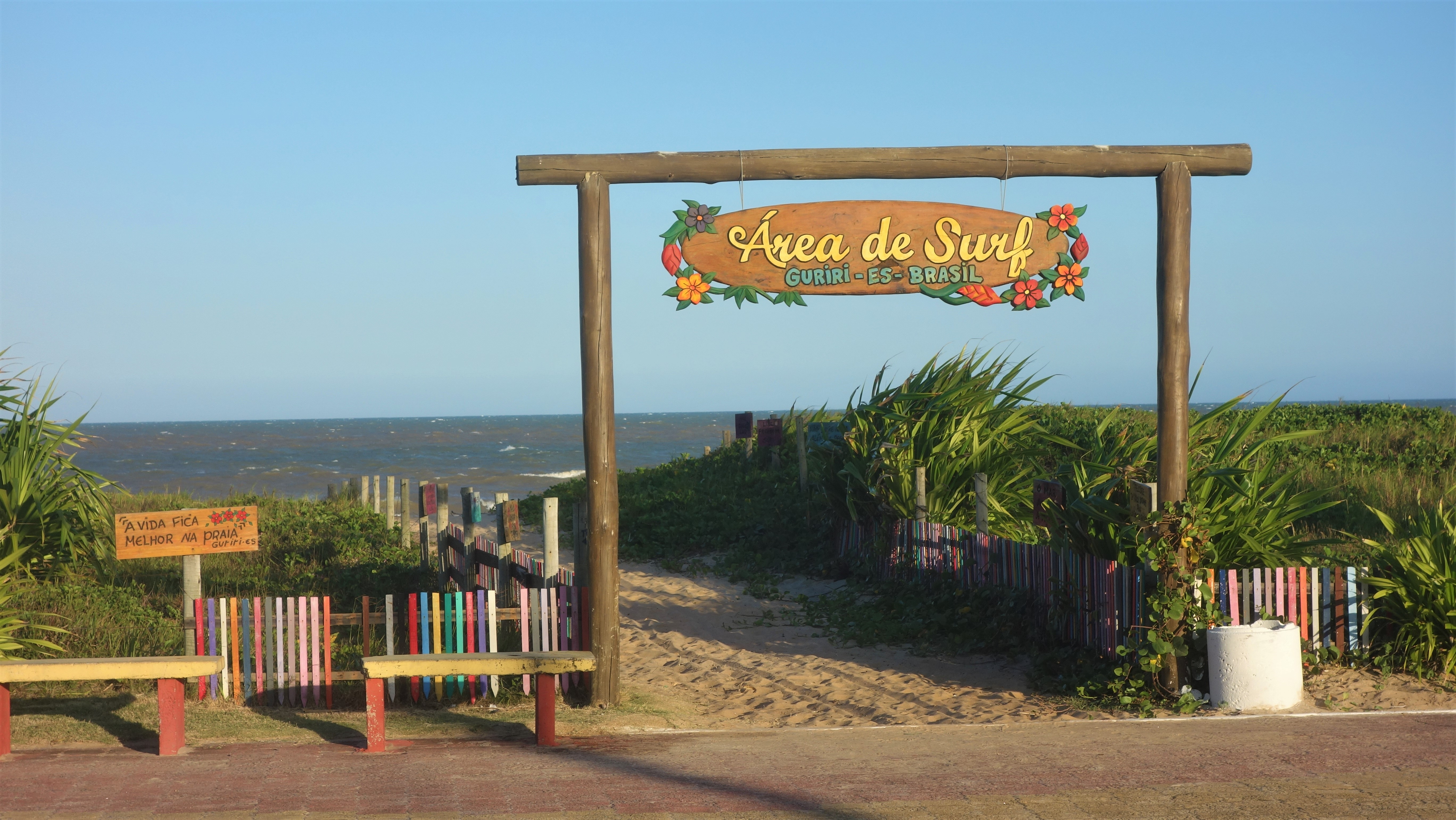
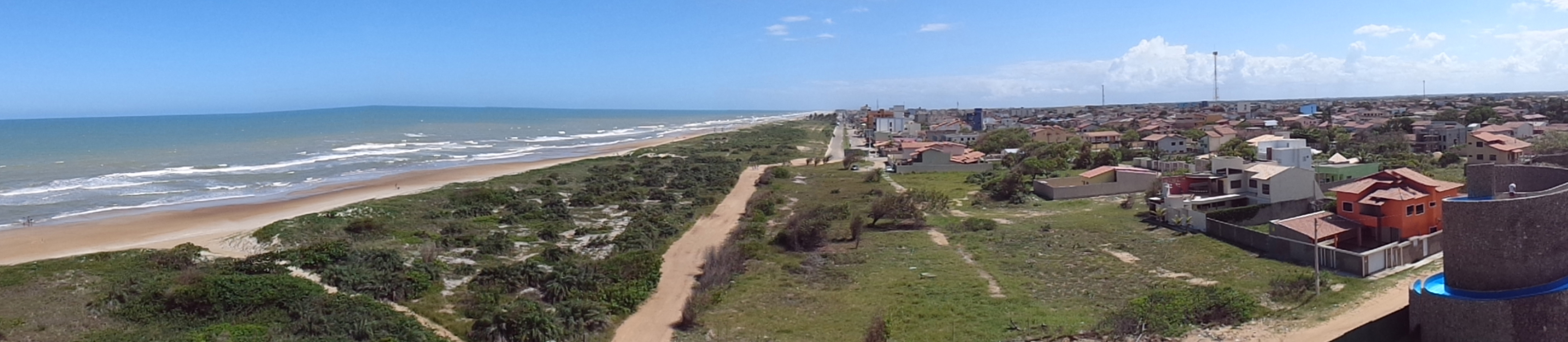

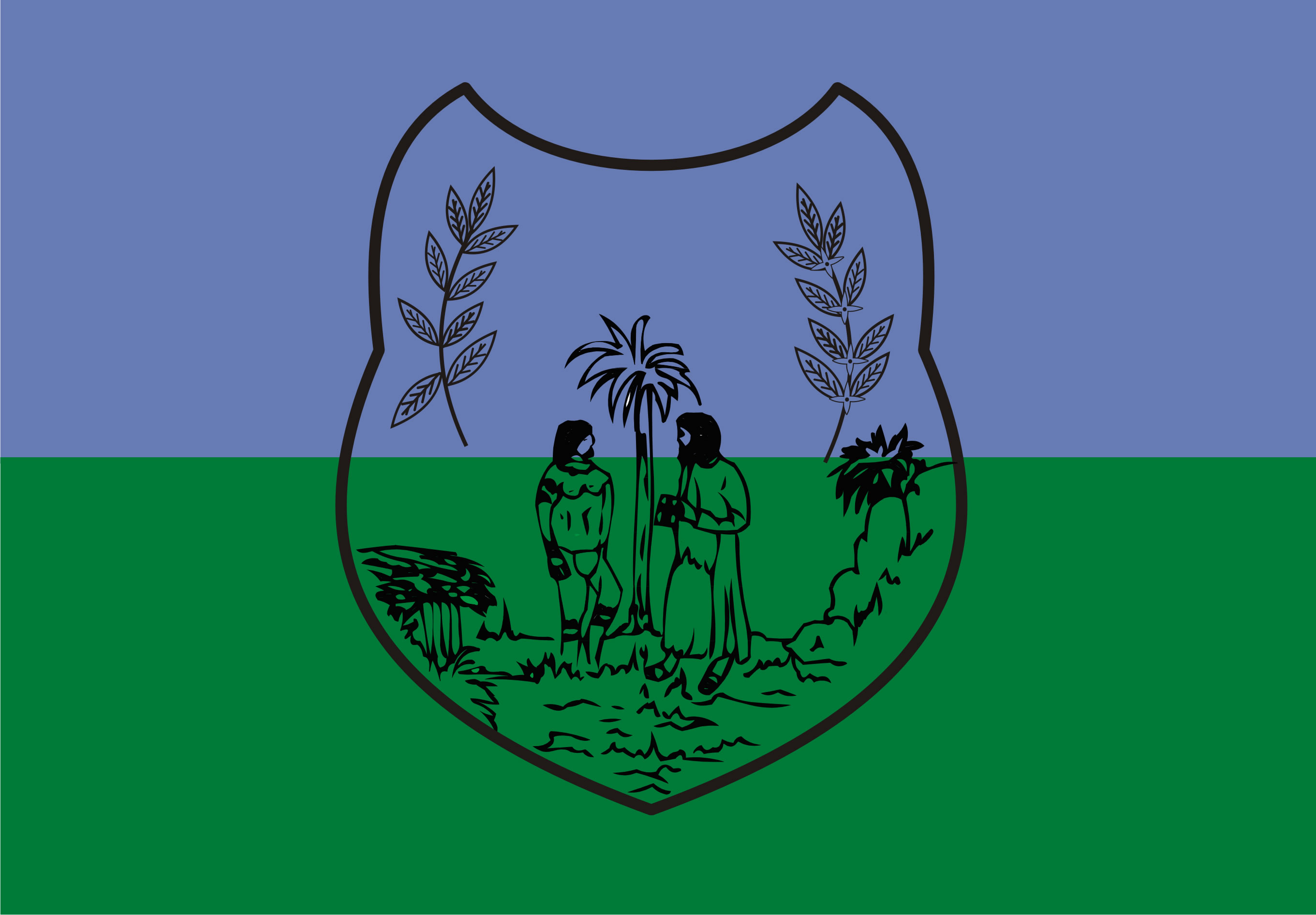
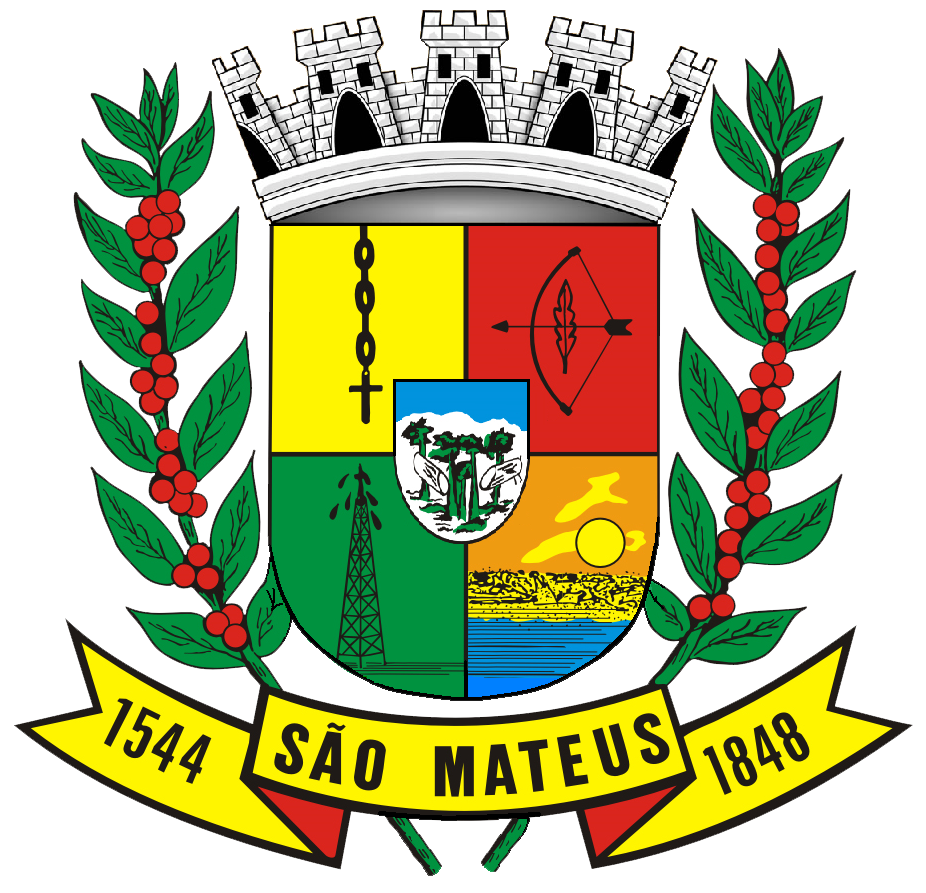
- Flag Coat of arms
- Nicknames: Queen of the Cricaré; Cultural Capital of Espírito Santo; Sama
- Motto: Working on the present, building the future
- Location in Espírito Santo

- Location in Brazil
- Coordinates: 18°43′00″S 39°51′31″W
- Country: Brazil
- State: Espírito Santo
- Mesoregion (IBGE/2013): Northern Espírito Santo Coast Mesoregion
- Microregion (IBGE/2013): São Mateus
- Districts: Barra Nova, Itauninhas, Nestor Gomes, Nova Verona, São Mateus (IBGE/2013)
- Neighboring municipalities: Boa Esperança, Conceição da Barra, Jaguaré, Linhares, Nova Venécia, Pinheiros, São Gabriel da Palha, Vila Valério
- Distance to capital: 215 kilometres (134 mi)
- Established: 21 September 1544

Government
  - Mayor: Daniel Santana Barbosa (PSDB)
  - Term ends: 2024

Area
  - Municipality: 2,338.727 km^{2} (902.988 sq mi)
  - Urban: 10.9503 km^{2} (4.2279 sq mi)
- Elevation: 36 m (118 ft)

Population (2022 Census)
  - Municipality: 123,750
  - Estimate (2025): 134,423
  - Rank: ES: 7th
  - Density: 52.913/km^{2} (137.05/sq mi)
- Demonym: Mateense
- Time zone: UTC−3 (BRT)
- Climate: Tropical savanna climate
- Köppen climate classification: Aw
- HDI (UNDP/2010): 0.735
- GDP (IBGE/2020): R$2,573,913.26
- GDP per capita (IBGE/2020): R$19,404.96
- Website: www.saomateus.es.gov.br

São Mateus is the eighth oldest municipality in Brazil and the seventh most populous in the state of Espírito Santo. Founded on September 21, 1544, it gained municipal autonomy in 1764. Originally named Povoado do Cricaré, it was renamed São Mateus in 1566 by Father Joseph of Anchieta. According to 2022 Census, its population is approximately 123,750 inhabitants. São Mateus is considered a milestone in the colonization of Espírito Santo's territory.

It has the largest Afro-descendant population in the state, a legacy of the Port of São Mateus, which, until the mid-19th century, was a major entry point for enslaved Africans in Brazil. The municipality also includes descendants of Italian immigrants, who contributed to the colonization of its rural hinterlands.

Its economy is driven by service provision and the exploration and production of petroleum. Petroleum fields were discovered in the 1970s, with further expansion in the 1980s. In the 2000s, the North Capixaba Terminal was established in the Campo Grande region to handle the region's production output.

Located at a latitude of 18º42'58" South and a longitude of 39º51'21" West, São Mateus sits at an altitude of 36 meters. Its total area is 2,338.727 square kilometres (902.988 sq mi), representing 5.12% of Espírito Santo's territory. It borders Boa Esperança, Pinheiros, and Conceição da Barra to the north; São Gabriel da Palha, Vila Valério, Jaguaré, and Linhares to the south; the Atlantic Ocean to the east; and Nova Venécia to the west. It is 215 kilometres (134 mi) from the state capital, Vitória. São Mateus is also known for its strong tourism appeal, both historical and seasonal. The carnival in Guriri, the municipality's main beach resort, is one of the liveliest in the state and is nationally recognized, attracting many tourists, particularly from Minas Gerais.

== Etymology ==
From its founding in 1544 until the mid-16th century, the small settlement along the banks of the São Mateus River was known as Povoação do Cricaré. The name São Mateus honors the evangelist Matthew, as Father Joseph of Anchieta, during one of his pilgrimages through the then Captaincy of Espírito Santo in 1566, celebrated a mass on September 21, Saint Matthew's Day. Following the custom of naming places and geographical features after the saint of the day, Anchieta renamed the Povoação do Cricaré to São Mateus.

== History ==
=== Pre-Cabral period ===
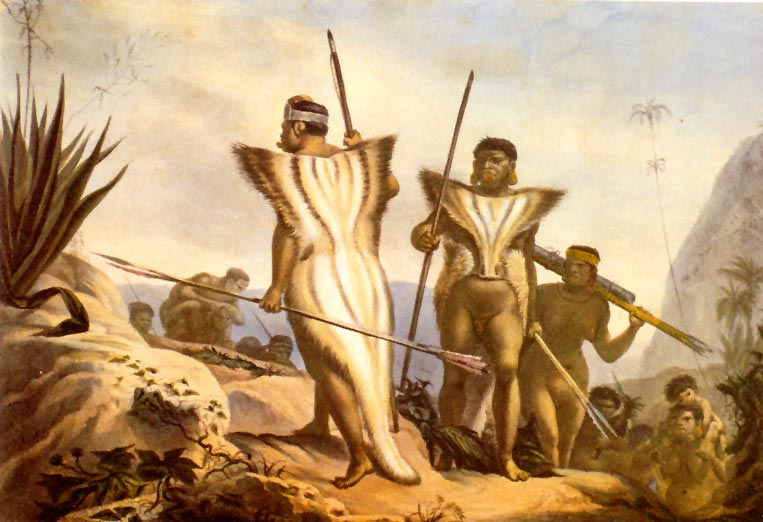
Botocudo Family on the Move, by Jean-Baptiste Debret, 1834

Before Portuguese colonization, the São Mateus region was inhabited by Aimorés, also known as Botocudos. Funerary urns found in the Barra Nova region in the 1960s, along with ceramic pieces unearthed near the Roberto Silvares Hospital in 1998, are attributed to the Tupi ethnic group, to which the Aimorés do not belong, and are dated from the 10th century to the 16th century.

Manuscripts from the early colonization period report the presence of cannibalistic Indians in the region. Unlike other Tupi Indians, these did not know how to swim but were skilled at rowing and working with clay.

Efforts by Jesuit priests to catechize the indigenous population were unsuccessful. Afonso Brás, the first missionary in the Captaincy of Espírito Santo, wrote in a 1551 letter that after receiving baptism, the Indians fled, returning to their beliefs and customs.

=== Arrival of the first colonizers ===
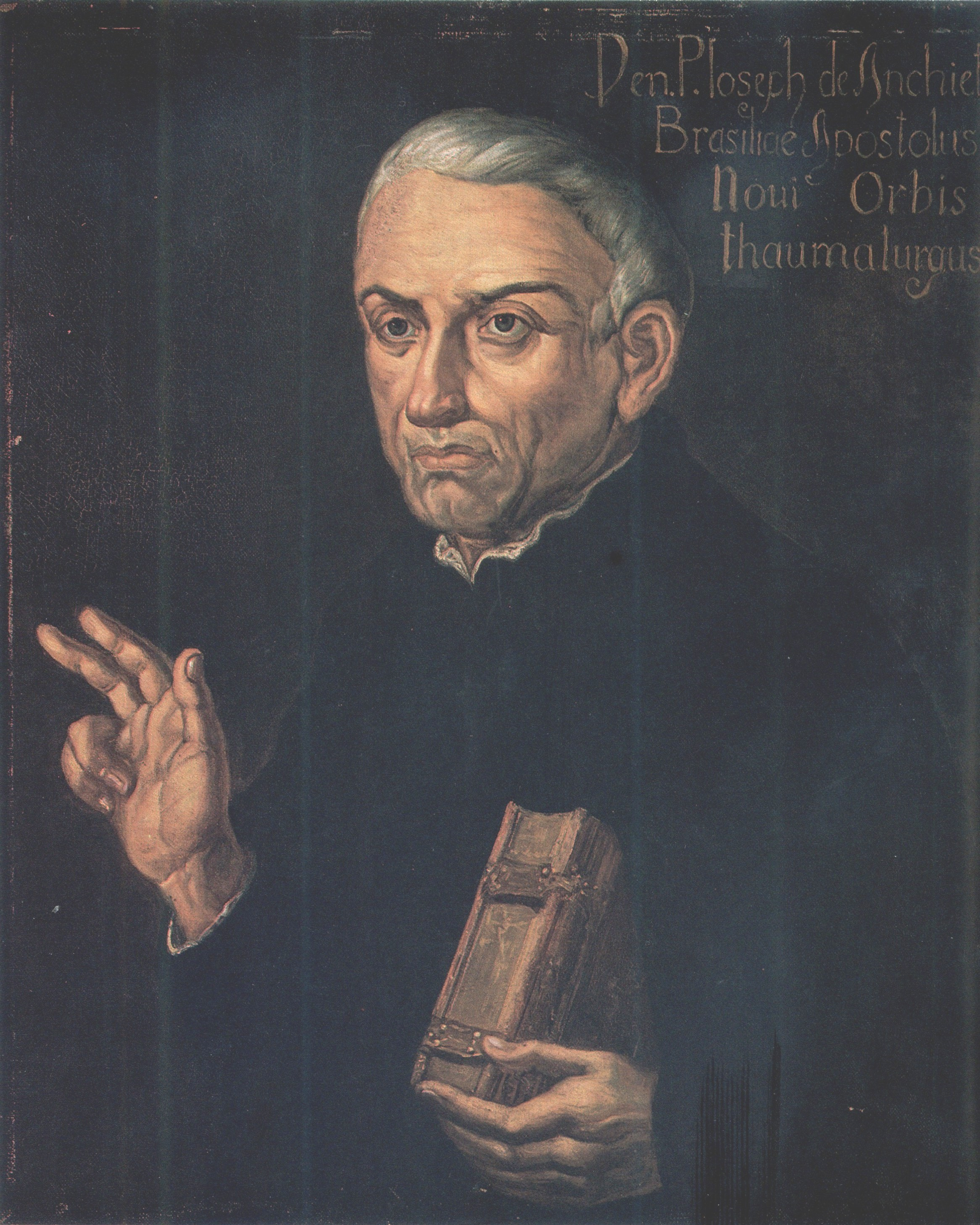
Father Joseph of Anchieta

There is no precise date or record of the first settlers' names, but oral tradition suggests Portuguese colonizers arrived in São Mateus around 1544. Alarmed by frequent indigenous attacks, settlers from Vasco Fernandes Coutinho's group reportedly split up, abandoning the Captaincy of Espírito Santo. Some fled to neighboring captaincies or moved inland, possibly heading north toward the São Mateus River.

The lack of records from the early colonization years leads to speculative hypotheses. One suggests São Mateus may have been settled by shipwreck survivors. Father Joseph of Anchieta's accounts note that in 1596, while passing through the São Mateus River, he celebrated mass for shipwrecked individuals, though no documentation confirms this as historical fact.

More likely, the first colonists came from the neighboring Captaincy of Porto Seguro, led by Pero do Campo Tourinho. The earliest documented Portuguese presence in the region relates to the Battle of Cricaré, which occurred in late January 1558. Another record is a letter describing a Jesuit mission by Father Fernão Cardin, who visited the Village of São Mateus in September 1583.

=== Slave trade ===
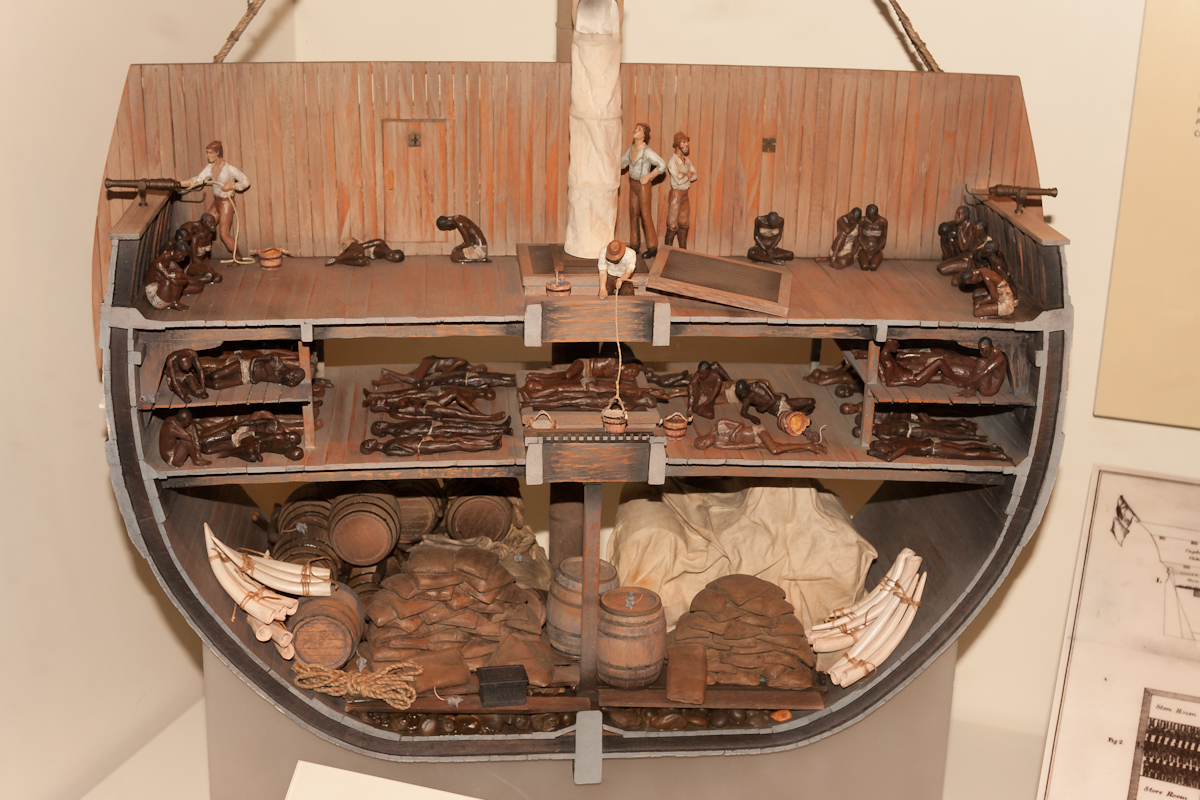
Model of the interior of a slave ship

The entry of enslaved Africans into the municipality occurred through the Port, beginning in the colonial period and intensifying in the 19th century, particularly after the 1850 ban on the transatlantic slave trade until the abolition of slavery. At its peak, 16 companies at the port were exclusively engaged in this trade.

The arrival of slave ships at the Port was eagerly anticipated by the population, especially buyers, hoping to select the best ones. Onboard, enslaved Africans were prepared: men and women were oiled, wounds and tumors covered with rust and gunpowder, and in cases of intestinal infections, their anuses were stuffed with tow. Once disembarked, chained in single file, they were driven to the market, where their physical condition and tribal origins were examined. Preference was given to those with slender shins, heels set back, and small buttocks, deemed ideal for fieldwork.

Notably, São Mateus recorded the seizure of the last clandestine slave ship on the Brazilian coast in 1856, following the 1850 law banning the African slave trade. Some ships carried over 300 captives, who arrived naked, malnourished, and chained, enduring voyages lasting over 90 days. Many succumbed to the harsh conditions and were thrown overboard.

Between 1863 and 1887, 606 enslaved Africans were traded in the city, including 326 men and 269 women. Prices varied based on factors like sex, age, occupation, and physical condition, and were influenced by events such as the 1850 transatlantic trade ban. According to municipal registry records, slave prices rose significantly from 1868, reaching 1,028,500 réis for men and 1,018,750 réis for women, a sharp increase from the previous year's averages of 375,000 réis for men and 637,916 réis for women.

=== Italian immigration ===
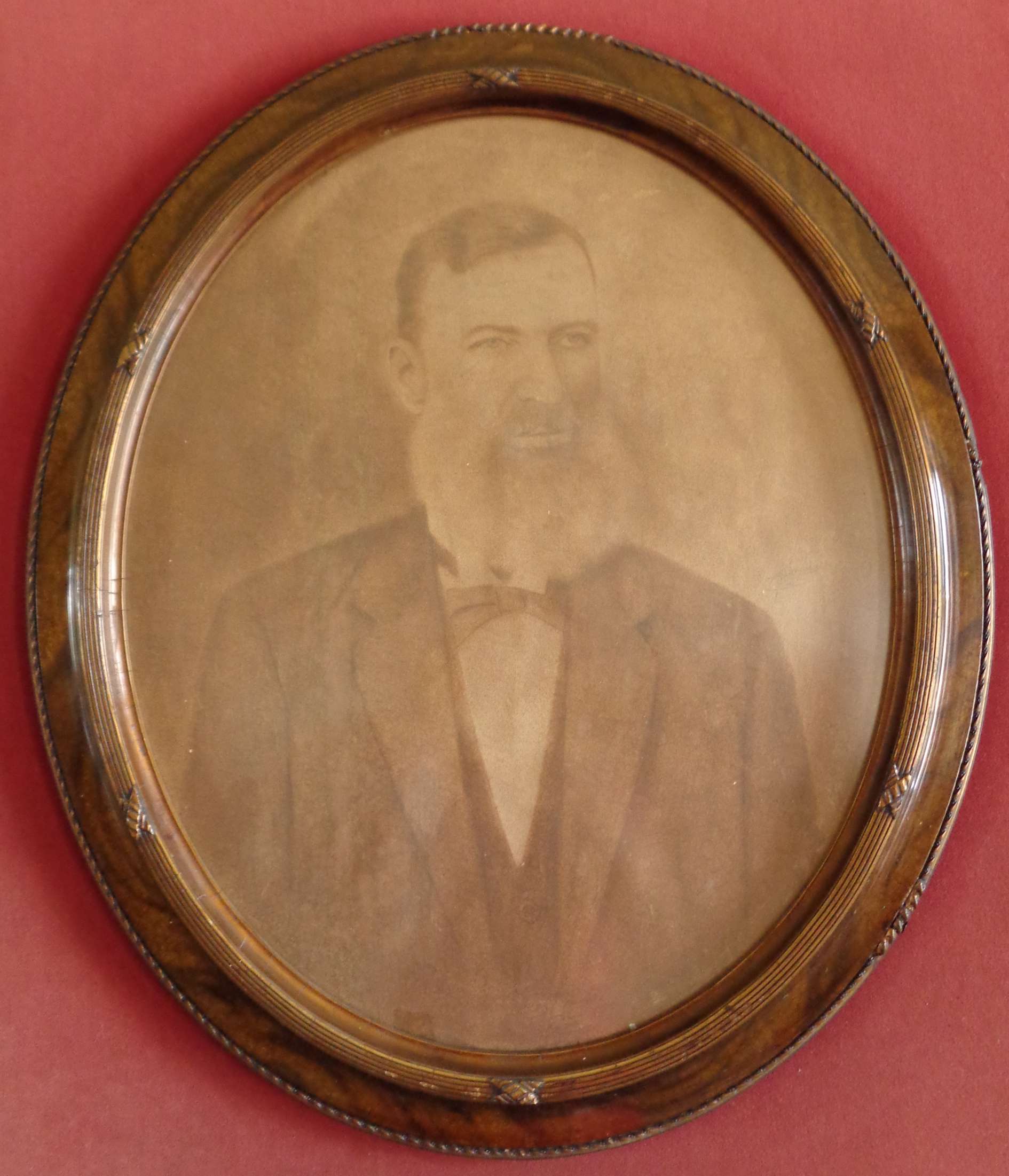
Baron of Aimorés

The state of Espírito Santo was the first to receive a significant wave of Italian immigrants around 1874, driven by major political changes in Europe during the early 19th century. These changes caused internal conflicts in the Kingdom of Italy, severely impacting its northern regions' populations.

Simultaneously, the 1888 abolition of slavery led to a shortage of skilled labor for coffee plantations.

In São Mateus, the first group of Italians arrived at the Port in 1887, at the request of the Baron of Aimorés, who, anticipating the abolition of slavery, requested immigrants from the Kingdom of Italy's consulate in Brazil to work on his farm along the Cravo Waterfall on the São Mateus River.

Successive arrivals of Italian immigrants continued at the old port until the end of the 19th century. Upon arrival, they were treated similarly to enslaved Africans, displayed in public squares for landowners to select. They were forced to show their hands for inspection; those with rough, calloused hands were chosen for farm work, while those with soft hands were labeled lazy and left to fend for themselves at the port.

=== Elevation to village status ===
With the discovery of gold in Minas Gerais in the second half of the 17th century, the Portuguese government, fearing loss of control, took measures to prevent adventurers from accessing the mines.

In 1764, Thomé Couceiro de Abreu, the ombudsman of the Captaincy of Porto Seguro, following orders from the Portuguese Crown, extended beyond his captaincy's territorial limits to elevate the settlement to village status. This was deemed necessary to prevent intrusions via the São Mateus River into the newly discovered gold mines. The chosen name, Villa Nova do Rio de São Mateus, was the same given by Anchieta. This occurred on September 27, 1764.

At the time of its elevation to village status, the settlement of São Mateus, located on a high plateau, had two streets flanking the Main Church. Four alleys extended from these streets to Córrego da Bica, then called Córrego do Mato. The two main streets had a few masonry houses where wealthier landowners lived, while less affluent residents, slaves, servants, and dependents lived in mud houses along the alleys.

During this period, the Captaincy of Espírito Santo was directly administered by the Portuguese Crown, as its donataries struggled with the challenging task. Consequently, the village was subordinated to the Captaincy of Porto Seguro until January 1823. Measures included street measurements, the construction of a town hall and jail, and the installation of a whipping post.

=== Creation of the municipality ===
On April 3, 1848, by decree of the president of the then Province of Espírito Santo, Dr. Luiz Pedreira de Couto Ferraz, Villa Nova do Rio São Mateus was elevated to city status, retaining the name São Mateus given by the first colonizers.

The people of São Mateus learned of this news after April 13, 1848, when correspondence was sent to the municipal council. To celebrate, a grand festival was held on April 21, 22, and 23 of the same year. Upon becoming a municipality, São Mateus' territory spanned 13,588 km², equivalent to 29.8% of Espírito Santo's territory. The comarca was established on March 23, 1853.

The first district created in the municipality was Serra dos Aimorés in 1886, later renamed Nova Venécia. In 1891, the first territorial division created the municipality of Conceição da Barra. In 1935, the district of Barra de São Francisco was created, becoming a municipality through Decree-Law 15,177 on December 31, 1943. In 1949, the districts of Barra Nova, Boa Esperança, Nestor Gomes, and Nova Verona were established, with Nova Venécia gaining autonomy via State Law No. 767 on December 11, 1953. Boa Esperança became a municipality through State Law No. 1912 on December 28, 1963. In 1964, the districts of Barra Seca, Itauninhas, and Jaguaré were created, with the latter becoming a municipality on December 13, 1981, via Law No. 3445.

== Geography ==
According to the Brazilian Institute of Geography and Statistics, the municipality's area is 2,338.727 square kilometres (902.988 sq mi), making it the second largest municipality by area in Espírito Santo. Of this, 2,332.3007 square kilometres (900.5063 sq mi) is rural area and 155.49 square kilometres (60.04 sq mi) is urban area. Located in the northeast of Brazil's Southeast Region, in the North Coast Mesoregion of Espírito Santo (São Mateus Microregion), it is 64 kilometres (40 mi) from the border with Bahia, at a latitude of 18º43’15” South and a longitude of 39º51’46” West. Its neighboring municipalities are Conceição da Barra to the north, Pinheiros and Boa Esperança to the northwest, Nova Venécia to the west, São Gabriel da Palha and Vila Valério to the southwest, Jaguaré and Linhares to the south, with the Atlantic Ocean to the east.

=== Topography ===
The topography of São Mateus is predominantly flat, with the municipal seat at 37.7 metres (124 ft) above sea level. The central region consists of Tertiary plateaus with a gentle slope toward the coast, ranging from 30 to 100 meters in height. The western part features granitic formations up to 350 meters, while the coastal area is flat with flood-prone regions and dunes, not exceeding 4 meters in altitude.

Three distinct soil types are found in the municipality:

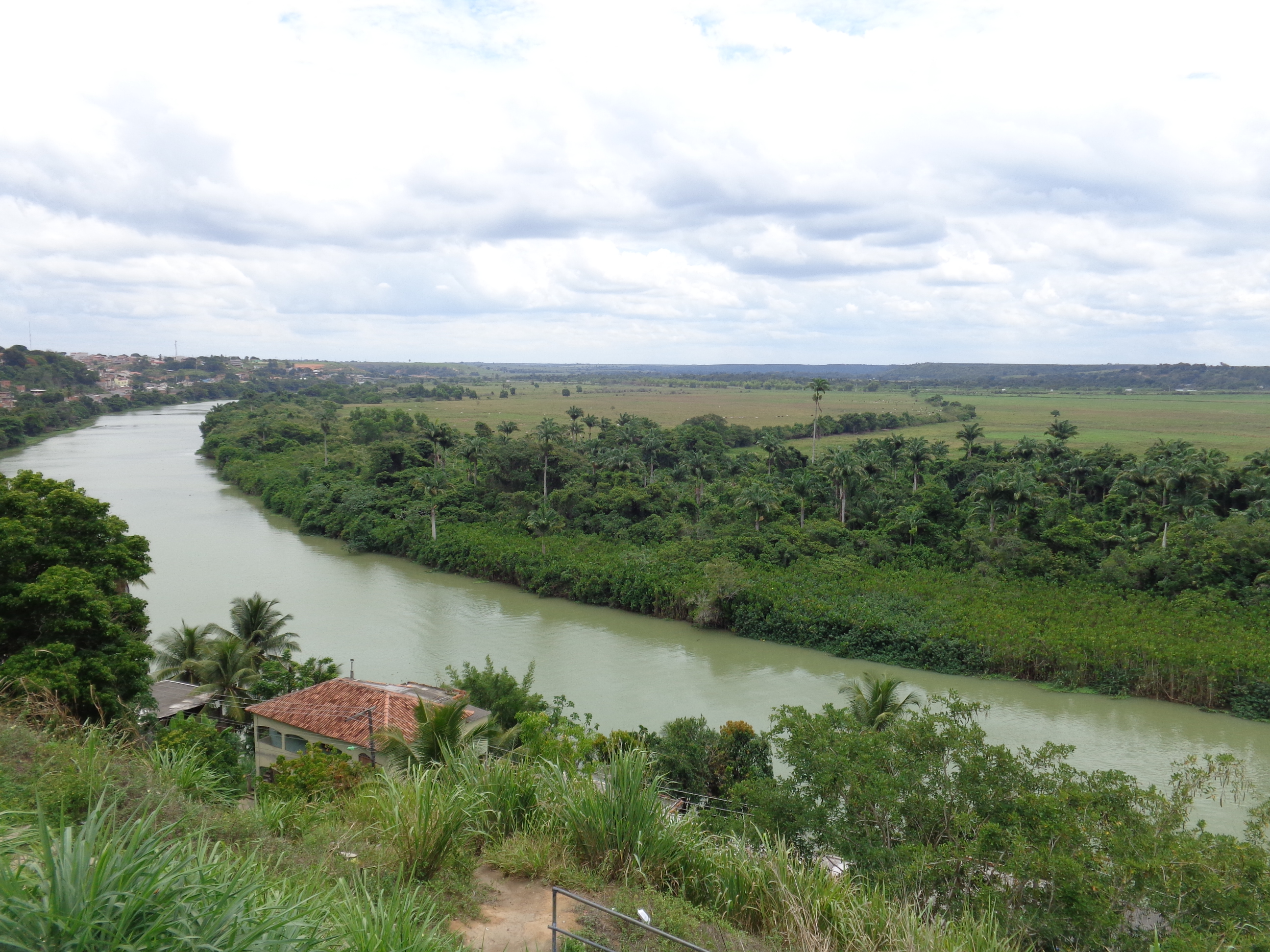
View of the São Mateus River valley from Mirante Square

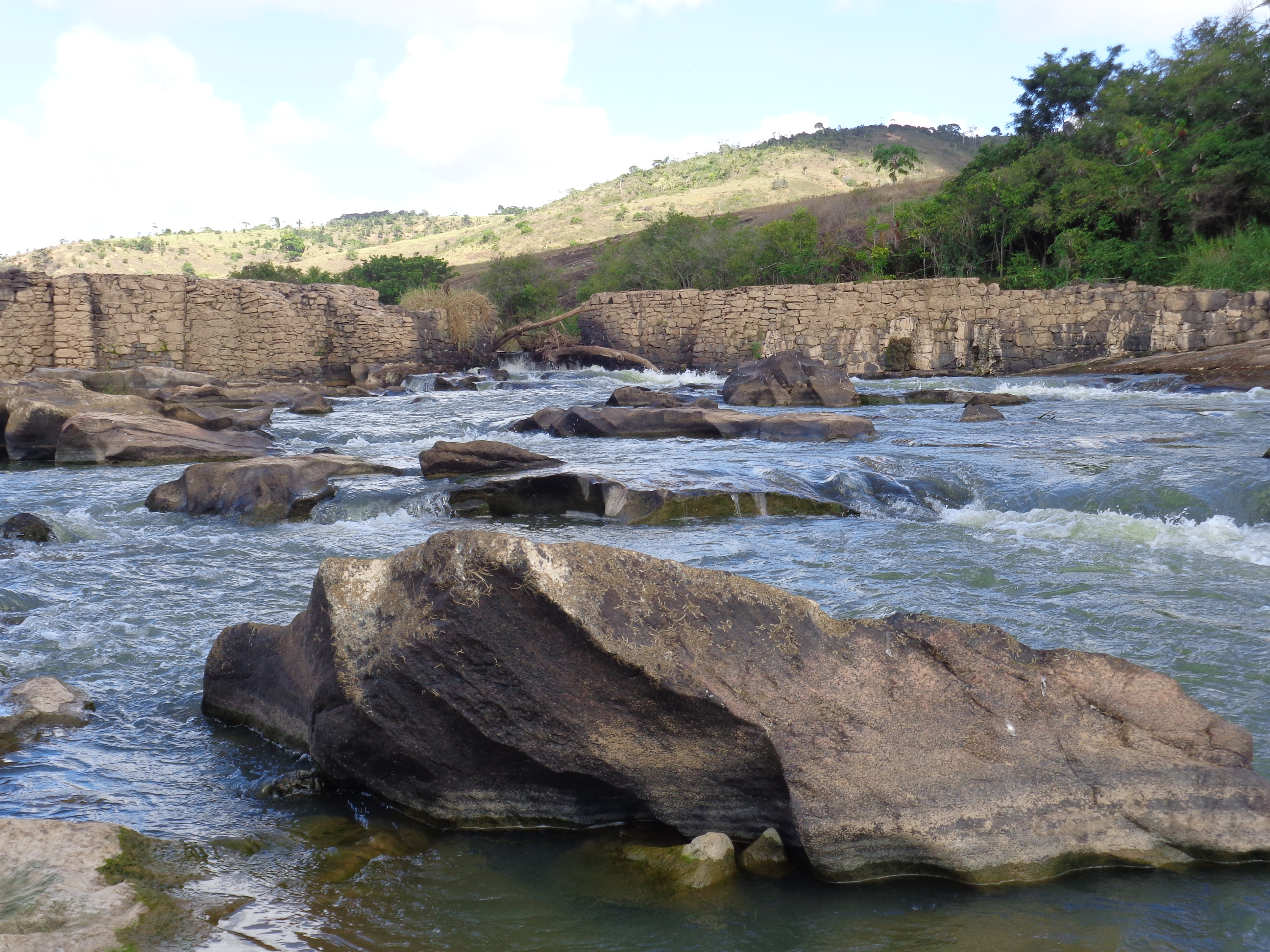
Jararaca Waterfall on the São Mateus River

- Precambrian Zone: Predominantly gneissic, part of the Brazilian Crystalline Shield, extending from the Nestor Gomes district to the border with Nova Venécia. This soil type is also found in the bed of the São Mateus River.
- Tertiary Zone: The predominant soil, characterized as dystrophic and podzolic red-yellow latosol, with medium to low fertility and a pH around 5.0. Composed of sedimentary plateaus with argillites and sandstone, these plateaus, ranging from 30 metres (98 ft) to 100 metres (330 ft), start in the Pedra d'Água neighborhood and extend to the Precambrian Zone in Nestor Gomes.
- Quaternary Sediment Zone: Found along valleys, riverways, and coastal plains, forming the sandy strip from Pedra D'Água to the Atlantic Ocean. It includes the Barra Nova district with sandstone reef formations, as well as the mangroves of Nativo and Campo Grande, and the swamps of Suruaca.

=== Hydrography ===
The municipality contains three hydrographic basins. The Doce River Basin covers a small area in the Suruaca Valley region. The Itaúnas River Basin encompasses a small portion of the Itauninhas district, while the São Mateus River Basin is the most extensive, draining over 90% of the municipality's area.

The São Mateus River Basin, also known locally as the Cricaré River, spans approximately 103,351 square kilometres (39,904 sq mi). It drains ten municipalities across Minas Gerais and Espírito Santo, emptying into the Atlantic Ocean in Conceição da Barra. Its main tributaries include the Cotaxé River, also known as the North Branch of the São Mateus River, Preto, Mingal da Vovó River, Panela Velha River, and Pirapococa River. Notably, this river has a rare distributary, the Mariricu River.

The city also has 43 kilometres (27 mi) of coastline, featuring beaches such as Abricó, Aldeia do Coco, Barra Nova, Bosque, Brejo Velho, Caramujo, Gameleira, Guriri, Campo Grande, Oitizeiro, Ranchinho, and Urussuquara, with Guriri being the most famous.

=== Climate ===
Highest 24-hour precipitation accumulations recorded in São Mateus by month (INMET, 1971–present)
Month	Accumulation	Date	Month	Accumulation	Date
January	156 millimetres (6.1 in)	January 14, 2003	July	103.4 millimetres (4.07 in)	July 25, 2011
February	87.9 millimetres (3.46 in)	February 12, 1975	August	48.8 millimetres (1.92 in)	August 17, 2014
March	152.8 millimetres (6.02 in)	March 13, 1996	September	105.4 millimetres (4.15 in)	September 28, 1983
April	93.4 millimetres (3.68 in)	April 11, 1971	October	105.3 millimetres (4.15 in)	October 30, 2014
May	98.9 millimetres (3.89 in)	May 18, 2019	November	175.3 millimetres (6.90 in)	November 22, 2008
June	66 millimetres (2.6 in)	June 13, 1993	December	107.6 millimetres (4.24 in)	December 12, 1997

The climate of São Mateus is classified by the Brazilian Institute of Geography and Statistics as a tropical wet and dry climate (type Aw according to the Köppen classification), with an average annual temperature of around 24 °C, featuring rainy summers with high temperatures and milder winters. The annual precipitation index is approximately 1,350 millimetres (53 in), with November and December being the wettest months. Air humidity is relatively high, with an insolation time of 2,140 h (7,700 ks) per year.

According to the National Institute of Meteorology (INMET), since 1971, the lowest recorded temperature in São Mateus was 8 °C (46 °F) on August 12, 1997, and the highest was 38.7 °C (101.7 °F) on February 25, 2006. The highest 24-hour precipitation accumulation was 175.3 millimetres (6.90 in) on November 22, 2008. The wettest month was November 2000, with 573.1 millimetres (22.56 in), followed by November 2008 (526.8 millimetres (20.74 in)) and November 2001 (504.8 millimetres (19.87 in)).

== Climate ==
Climate data for São Mateus, Espírito Santo (1991–2020 normals, extremes 1971–present)
Month	Jan	Feb	Mar	Apr	May	Jun	Jul	Aug	Sep	Oct	Nov	Dec	Year
Record high °C (°F)	37.5 (99.5)	38.7 (101.7)	37.5 (99.5)	38.2 (100.8)	36.9 (98.4)	35.0 (95.0)	35.7 (96.3)	32.8 (91.0)	36.8 (98.2)	36.0 (96.8)	35.2 (95.4)	38.1 (100.6)	38.7 (101.7)
Mean daily maximum °C (°F)	32.1 (89.8)	32.8 (91.0)	32.6 (90.7)	31.2 (88.2)	29.7 (85.5)	28.8 (83.8)	28.1 (82.6)	28.1 (82.6)	28.8 (83.8)	29.6 (85.3)	29.8 (85.6)	31.2 (88.2)	30.2 (86.4)
Mean daily minimum °C (°F)	22.8 (73.0)	22.8 (73.0)	22.7 (72.9)	21.8 (71.2)	19.8 (67.6)	18.5 (65.3)	17.7 (63.9)	17.7 (63.9)	18.8 (65.8)	20.3 (68.5)	21.4 (70.5)	22.3 (72.1)	20.6 (69.1)
Record low °C (°F)	17.5 (63.5)	17.7 (63.9)	14.6 (58.3)	14.0 (57.2)	12.6 (54.7)	10.2 (50.4)	10.5 (50.9)	8.0 (46.4)	10.2 (50.4)	11.7 (53.1)	13.5 (56.3)	15.6 (60.1)	8.0 (46.4)
Average precipitation mm (inches)	124.1 (4.89)	89.4 (3.52)	147.0 (5.79)	115.1 (4.53)	72.3 (2.85)	63.5 (2.50)	75.0 (2.95)	61.7 (2.43)	66.9 (2.63)	119.0 (4.69)	230.4 (9.07)	176.6 (6.95)	1,341 (52.80)
Average precipitation days (≥ 1.0 mm)	10	9	10	11	7	7	9	8	8	10	12	12	113
Average relative humidity (%)	81.6	80.2	81.6	82.7	82.6	83.6	83.8	80.2	80.1	80.0	82.5	82.1	81.8
Mean monthly sunshine hours	230	224.3	220.2	188.1	193.5	172.5	185.8	201.3	178.9	179.9	154.6	183.9	2,313
Source: Instituto Nacional de Meteorologia (humidity 1981–2010)

=== Ecology and environment ===
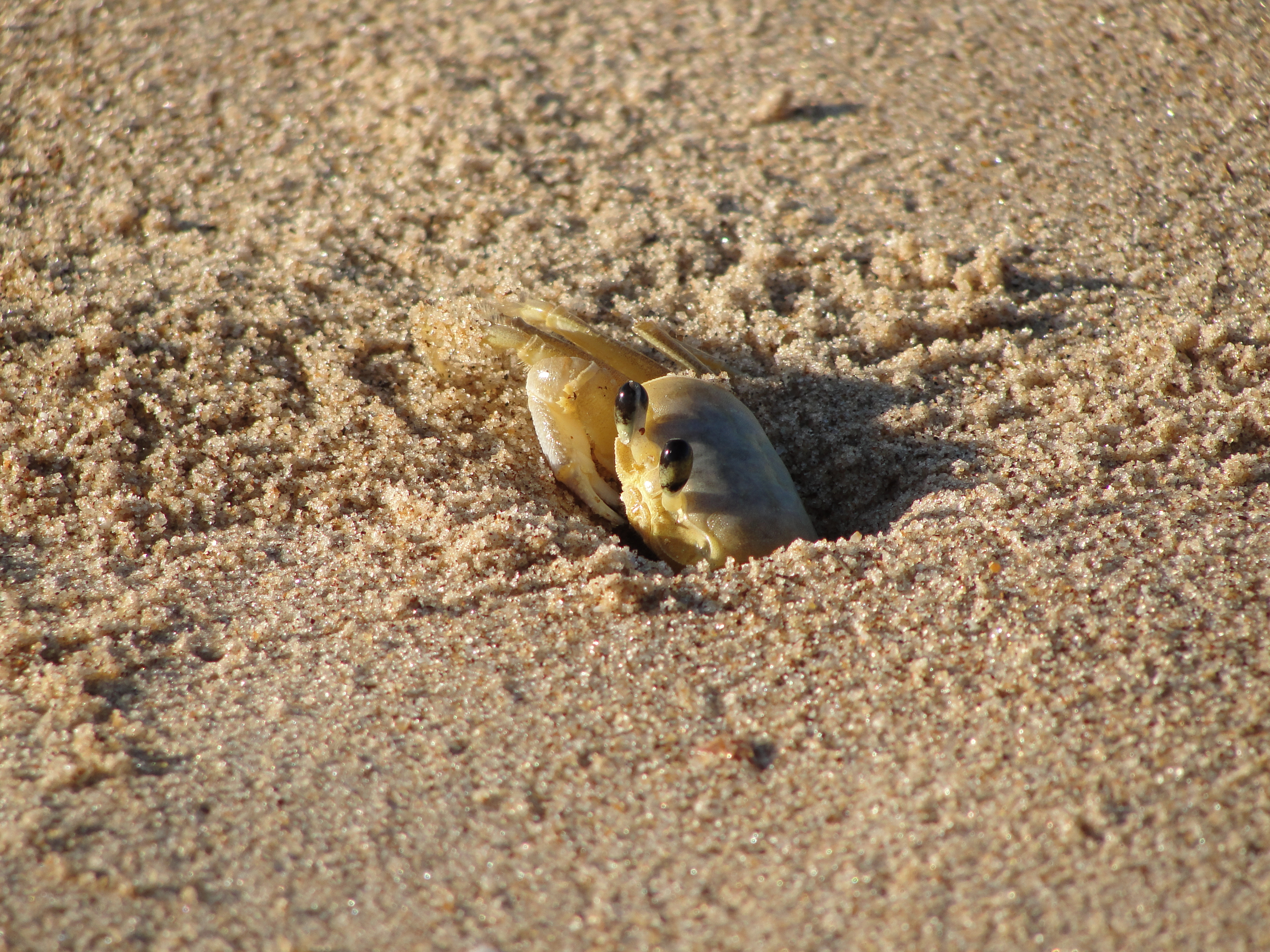
Crab emerging from its burrow

In São Mateus, the coastal region was historically dominated by restinga. The remaining restinga is part of the Atlantic Forest Biosphere Reserve, and the entire São Mateus coastline is within the buffer zone of the Abrolhos Marine National Park.

In the plateaus and river valleys, the original cover was Atlantic Forest, rich in hardwoods. Most of the Atlantic Forest has been replaced by monoculture reforestation (eucalyptus), livestock farming, and crops such as coffee, coconut, and black pepper. However, some biodiversity persists in undisturbed patches, including bromeliads, orchids, indaiá palms, golden trumpet trees, pumpwoods, purple glory trees, and ferns.

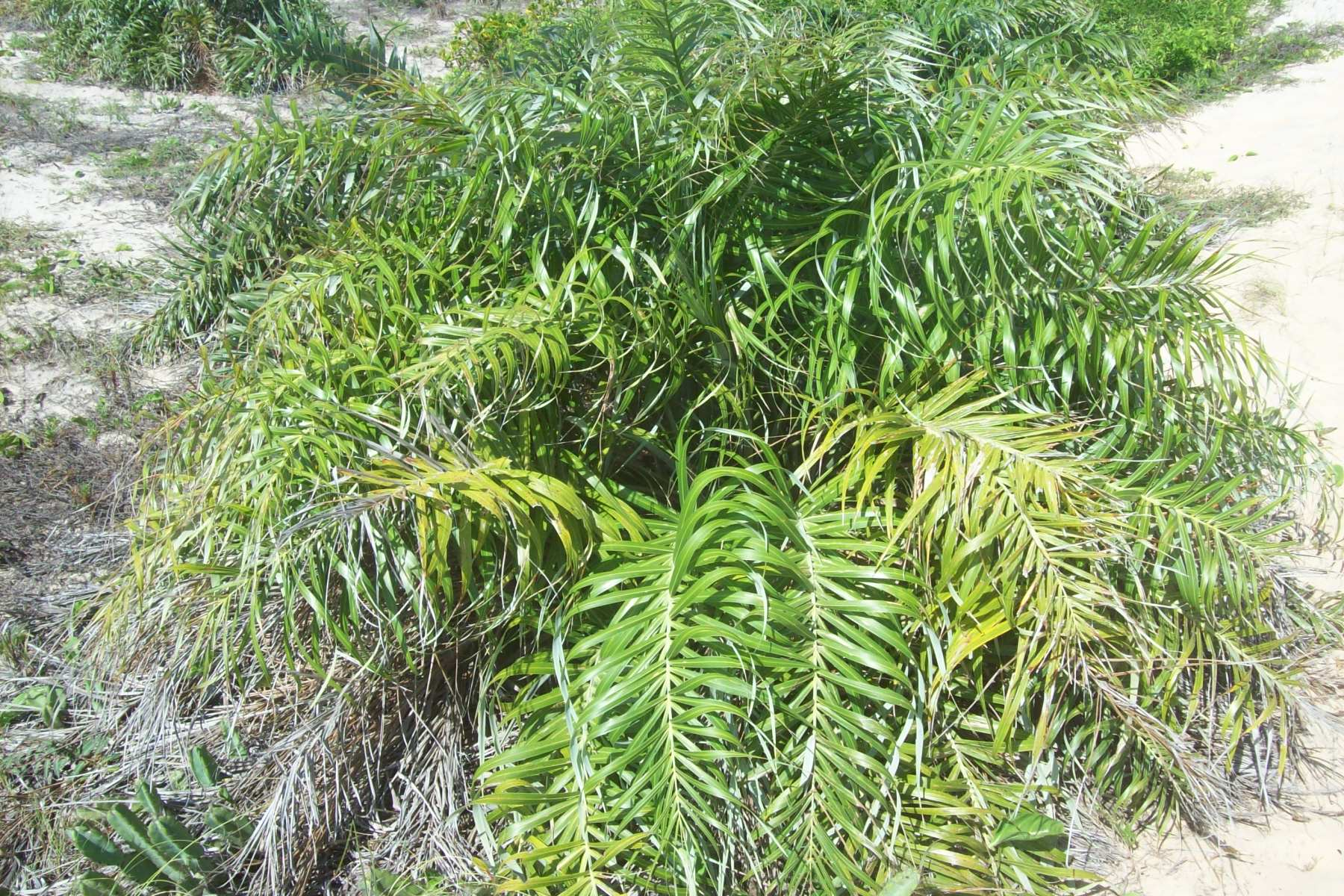
Allagoptera arenaria palm, endemic to the region

The only ecological station in the municipality is Barra Nova. Its creation was a condition imposed on Petrobras for the establishment of the North Capixaba Terminal in the Barra Nova district. This area is considered extremely important for fish, amphibians, birds, and mammals, and serves as a spawning ground for four of the seven species of sea turtles worldwide.

According to the National Institute for Space Research (INPE), in 2013, only 15.425 square kilometres (5.956 sq mi) (7%) of the municipality's area was covered by native vegetation, including 9.899 square kilometres (3.822 sq mi) of Atlantic Forest, 2.066 square kilometres (0.798 sq mi) of restinga, 1.452 square kilometres (0.561 sq mi) of mangroves, and 2.008 square kilometres (0.775 sq mi) of floodplain vegetation. Preserved areas are home to animals such as spiders, crabs, butterflies, and dragonflies among invertebrates; snakes, tortoises, and lizards among reptiles; frogs and toads among amphibians; parakeets, pigeons, thrushes, tanagers, and toucans among birds; and giant otters, capybaras, otters, and marmosets among mammals.

== Demographics ==
In 2010, the Brazilian Institute of Geography and Statistics (IBGE) recorded a population of 109,028 inhabitants. According to the census that year, 53,930 were men and 55,098 were women. Of the total, 84,541 lived in the urban area and 24,487 in the rural area. In the first decade of the 21st century, São Mateus' population grew by 20.56%, making it one of the fastest-growing municipalities in Espírito Santo during this period. According to 2014 statistics, the population was 122,668, ranking as the seventh most populous in the state. In 2010, 28,124 inhabitants (25.80%) were under 15 years old, 74,752 (68.56%) were aged 15 to 64, and 6,152 (5.64%) were over 65. The life expectancy at birth was 75.6 years, and the total fertility rate was 2.0 children per woman.

The Human Development Index (HDI-M) of São Mateus is considered high, at 0.735 in 2010 according to the United Nations Development Programme (UNDP), ranking as the eighth highest in Espírito Santo and 897th in Brazil. The education index was 0.655, the longevity index was 0.843, and the income index was 0.719. From 2000 to 2010, the proportion of people with a per capita household income of up to half the minimum wage decreased by 49.7%. In 2010, 84.6% of the population lived above the poverty line, 9.7% were at the poverty line, and 5.7% were below it. The Gini coefficient, measuring social inequality, was 0.577, where 1.00 is the worst and 0.00 is the best. The wealthiest 20% of the population accounted for 60.9% of the municipal income, 19.9 times higher than the 3.1% share of the poorest 20%.

Demographic evolution of São Mateus

=== Ethnicities and migration ===
São Mateus is a multiracial city, originally populated by Indians, Portuguese, Africans, and, from the late 19th century, Italians. According to the 2010 IBGE census, based on self-declaration, the population consisted of 62,464 pardos (57.29%), 30,717 whites (28.17%), 14,842 blacks (13.61%), 905 Asians (0.83%), and 101 indigenous people (0.09%). In the same year, 108,897 inhabitants were Brazilian (99.88%), of whom 108,835 were native-born (99.82%) and 62 were naturalized Brazilians (0.06%), and 131 were foreigners (0.12%).

By region of birth, 96,784 were born in the Southeast Region (88.77%), 10,324 in the Northeast (9.47%), 658 in the North (0.60%), 378 in the South (0.35%), and 298 in the Central-West (0.27%). 85,647 were natives of Espírito Santo (78.56%), with 59,017 born in the municipality (54.13%). Among the 23,381 from other states (27.30%), Minas Gerais had the largest presence with 7,784 residents (7.14%), followed by São Paulo with 2,208 (2.02%), and Rio de Janeiro with 1,144 (1.05%). Studies indicate that economic inequality disproportionately affects the black population, particularly women, who have lower education levels and wages. According to IBGE, the black population grew from 10,680 (1970 Census) to 77,112 (76.31% of 101,051) by 2006.

=== Religion ===
Religion in São Mateus
Religion	Percentage
Roman Catholicism	54.91%
Protestantism	33.23%
No religion	8.68%
Jehovah's Witnesses	1.19%
Spiritists	0.58%
Others	1.41%

According to the 2010 census by the Brazilian Institute of Geography and Statistics (IBGE), São Mateus' population is predominantly composed of 59,867 Roman Catholics (57.41%), 36,227 Protestants (33.23%), 9,468 people without religion (8.68%), and 1,297 Jehovah's Witnesses (1.19%). There are also 637 Spiritists (0.58%), 51 followers of new Eastern religions (0.05%), 50 Candomblé practitioners (0.05%), 42 Umbanda practitioners (0.04%), 20 esoterics (0.02%), and 12 Buddhists (0.01%). Additionally, 148 had undetermined or multiple religious affiliations (0.14%), and 278 did not know how to answer. The municipality's history records various other forms of religiosity, such as “Mesas de Santo,” “Cabula,” or “Pemba,” led by Saint Barbara, Saint Mary, Cosmas and Damian, and Saint Cyprian.

==== Roman Catholic Church ====
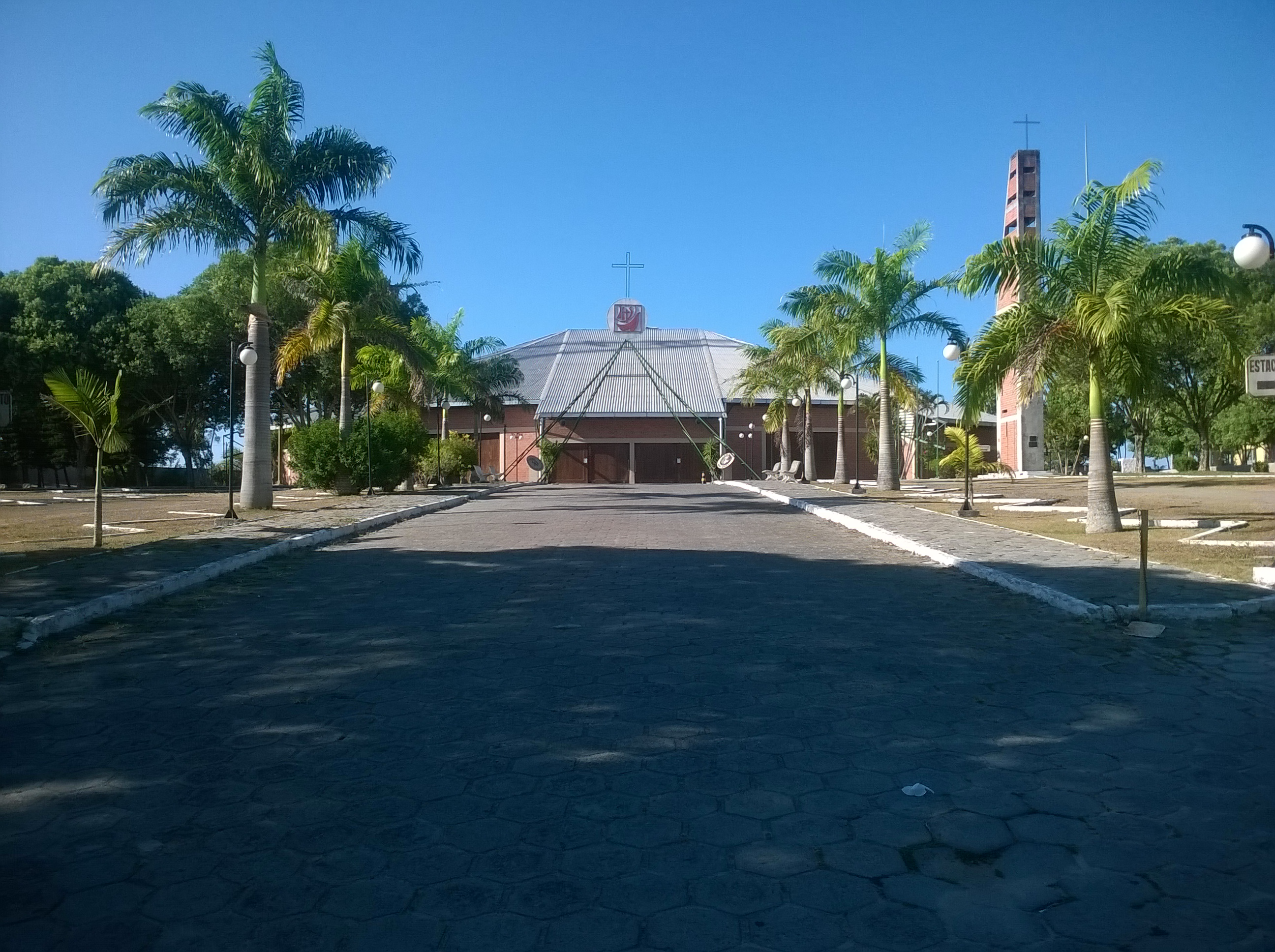
São Mateus Cathedral

According to the Catholic Church, São Mateus is part of the Ecclesiastical Province of Vitória do Espírito Santo, headquartered in Vitória. The city serves as the episcopal see of the Diocese of São Mateus, established by Pope Pius XII through the bull Cum Territorium on February 16, 1958, when it was separated from the then Diocese of Espírito Santo, now the Archdiocese of Vitória.

The city's communities are governed by three parishes: the Parish of Saint Matthew in Centro, the Parish of Saint Daniele Comboni in Guriri, and the Parish of Saint Anthony in the Santo Antônio neighborhood. In October 2015, the Diocese of São Mateus had Dom Paulo Bosi Dal’Bó as its titular bishop, with Dom Aldo Gerna as emeritus bishop. At that time, the diocese included 30 diocesan priests, 10 Comboni Fathers, 2 Capuchin friars, 2 deacons, and 9 Benedictine nuns living in cloister at the Benedictine Monastery of the Virgin of Guadalupe.

== Evangelical Churches ==
Although the city developed within a predominantly Catholic social framework, it is now possible to find the presence of various Protestant denominations. The city is home to a wide range of Protestant or Reformed faiths, with notable representation from the Assemblies of God with 9,843 members, the Baptist Church with 7,908, the Universal Church of the Kingdom of God with 1,630 members, and the Maranatha Christian Church with 1,315 members.

== Politics and administration ==
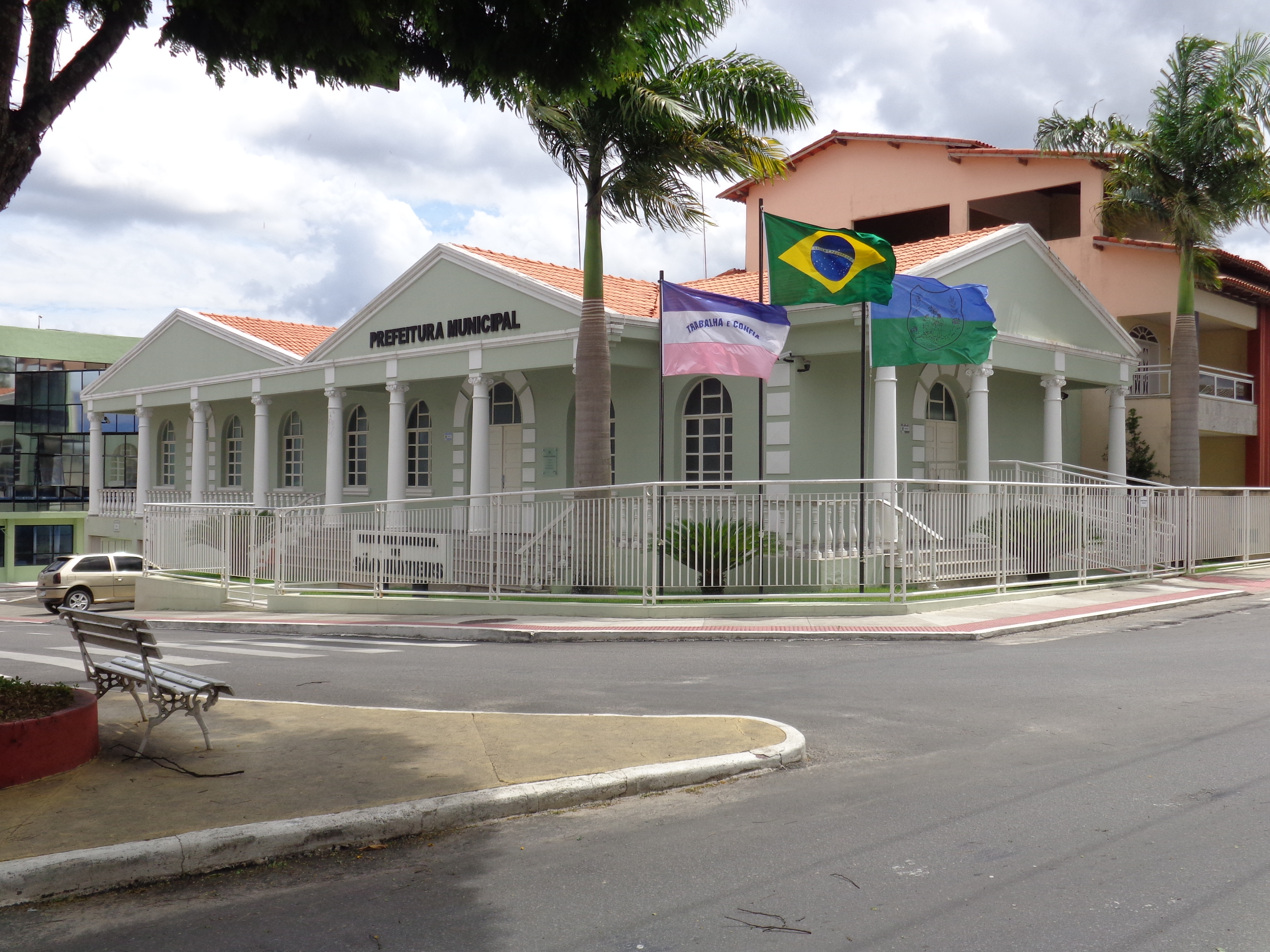
City Hall of São Mateus

According to the municipal organic law, enacted on April 5, 1990, municipal administration is carried out by the executive and legislative powers. João dos Santos Neves, the then President of the Municipal Government, was the first representative of the executive power. Prior to this, the City Council managed the administration entirely. Amadeu Boroto, from the Brazilian Socialist Party (PSB), was elected mayor in the 2012 municipal elections, securing a total of 38,742 votes (69.27% of voters), with Keydson Quaresma Gomes as deputy mayor.

The legislative power is exercised by the municipal chamber, composed of eleven councilors elected for four-year terms, in accordance with Article 29 of the Constitution. As of January 2015, the chamber consisted of four seats held by the Brazilian Socialist Party (PSB), two by the National Mobilization Party (PMN), one by the Social Democratic Party (PSD), one by the Communist Party of Brazil (PCdoB), one by the Humanist Party of Solidarity (PHS), one by the Workers' Party (PT), and one by the Democratic Labour Party (PDT). The chamber is responsible for drafting and voting on fundamental laws for the administration and the executive, particularly the participatory budget (Budget Guidelines Law).

The city is the seat of the São Mateus Judicial District, classified as a third-tier jurisdiction, covering only the municipality itself. In December 2014, there were 77,697 registered voters, representing 2.923% of the total in the state of Espírito Santo. São Mateus has two sister cities: Sondrio (Italy) and Luoyang (China). The initiative to adopt Sondrio as a sister city originated from the Diocese of São Mateus, as Bishop Emeritus Dom Aldo Gerna hails from that city. The partnership with Luoyang, initiated by the municipal executive, aims to foster commercial cooperation between the two cities.

== Subdivisions ==
The municipality of São Mateus is divided into five districts: Barra Nova, Itauninhas, Nestor Gomes, Nova Verona, and the Seat. According to the 2010 demographic census, the Seat had 77,090 inhabitants, followed by Barra Nova with 16,342, Nestor Gomes with 10,823, Itauninhas with 3,343, and Nova Verona with 1,430. In 2015, the city had 56 neighborhoods divided into six zones: 15 neighborhoods in the East Zone, 15 in the West Zone, 9 in the Central Zone, 8 in the South Zone, 7 in the Cricaré Lowland, and 2 in the North Zone. Among the neighborhoods, Guriri stands out as the most populous, with 12,470 inhabitants in 2010.

Districts of São Mateus.

=== Neighborhoods ===
==== Central Zone ====
- Centro
- Boa Vista
- Forno Velho
- Inocoop
- Lago dos Cisnes
- Malvina
- Nova Holanda
- Sernamby
- São Carlos
- Vintem

==== North Zone ====
- Jambeiro
- Litorâneo
- Villages

==== South Zone ====
- Cohab
- Jaqueline
- Morada do Ribeirão
- Nova Era
- Nova Esperança
- Ribeirão
- Rodocon
- Seac

==== East Zone ====
- Areinha
- Aviação
- Blocos
- Chiado
- El Dourado
- Guriri
- Lago do Cisnes
- Liberdade
- Mariricu
- Pedra d'água
- Rio Preto
- Nova Conquista
- Parque Washington
- Residencial Park
- San Remo
- Universitário

==== West Zone ====
- Aroeira
- Ayrton Senna
- Bom Sucesso I
- Bom Sucesso II
- Bom Sucesso III
- Caiçaras
- Colina
- Morada Do Lago
- Nova São Mateus
- Novo Horizonte
- Santo Antônio
- São Pedro
- Vila Nova
- Vila Verde
- Vitória

==== Baixada do Cricaré ====
- Cacique I
- Cacique II
- Cricaré
- Santa Inês
- Santa Terezinha
- Porto
- Vila Maruim

== Economy ==
GDP breakdown in 2012
Sector	Value
Primary	R$278,692,000.00
Secondary	R$245,387,000.00
Tertiary	R$854,086,000.00
Taxes	R$96,320,000.00
Total	R$1,474,484,000.00

In 2012, São Mateus's gross domestic product (GDP) was approximately one billion four hundred million reais, accounting for 49.8% of the total GDP of its microregion, making it the largest in the region and the eleventh in the state. Of the total GDP in that year, R$278,692,000 came from the primary sector, R$245,387,000 from the secondary sector, R$854,086,000 from the tertiary sector, and R$96,320,000 were collected from taxes on products net of subsidies at current prices. The per capita GDP was R$13,184.81.

In 2010, 71.3% of the population over 18 years old was economically active, with an unemployment rate of 8.7%.

Primary sector

In 2012, the primary sector generated approximately 280 million reais in São Mateus, making it the second-largest contributor to the GDP. In 2010, of the employed population aged 18 or older, 22.75% worked in agriculture and 2.82% in extractive industries. Among the primary activities, notable are the extraction of petroleum and natural gas, silviculture, and the cultivation of coconut. Other significant crops include macadamia, coffee, black pepper. Horticulture and livestock farming are also important, though to a lesser extent.

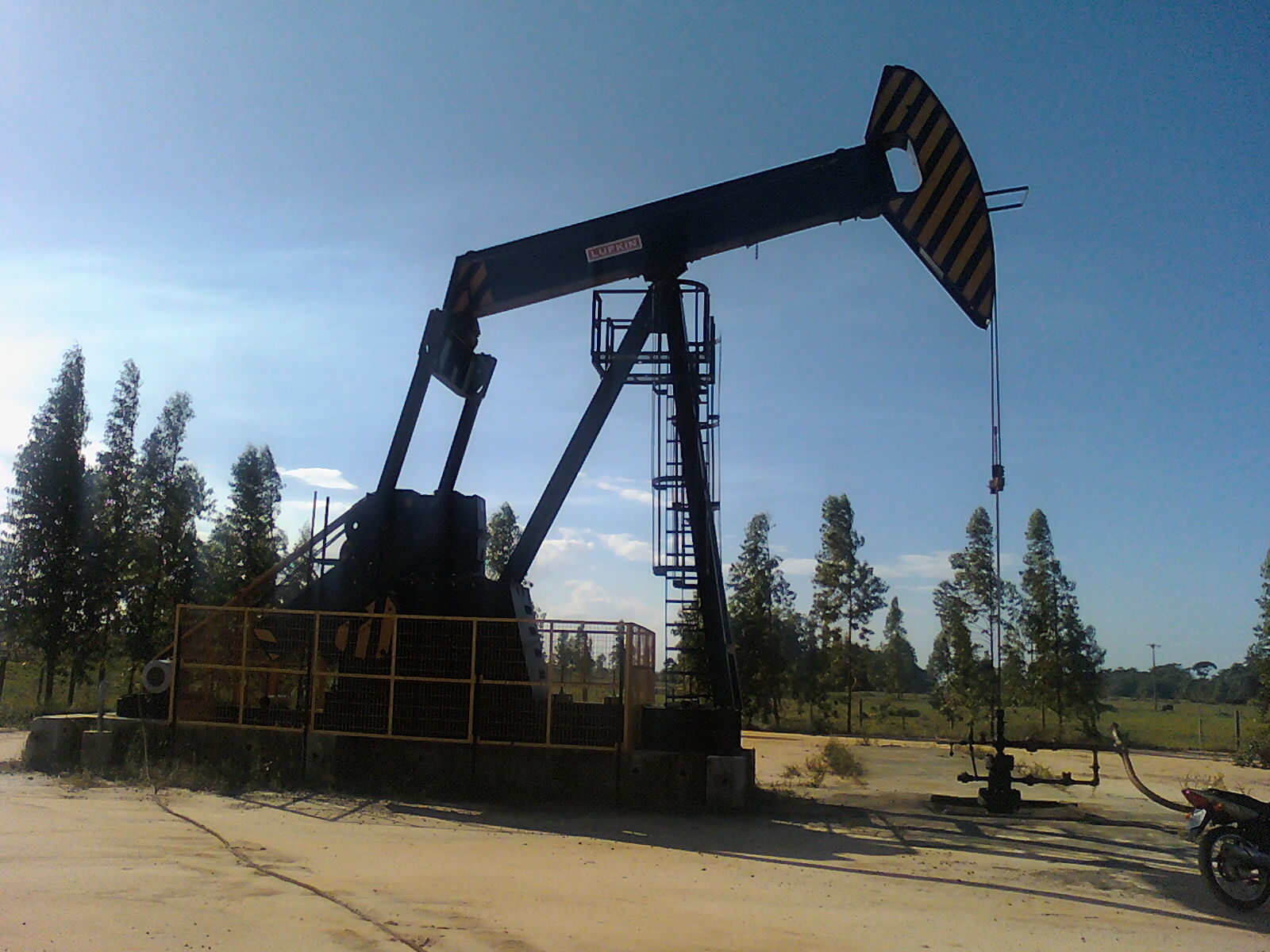
Oil extraction in the Nativo region

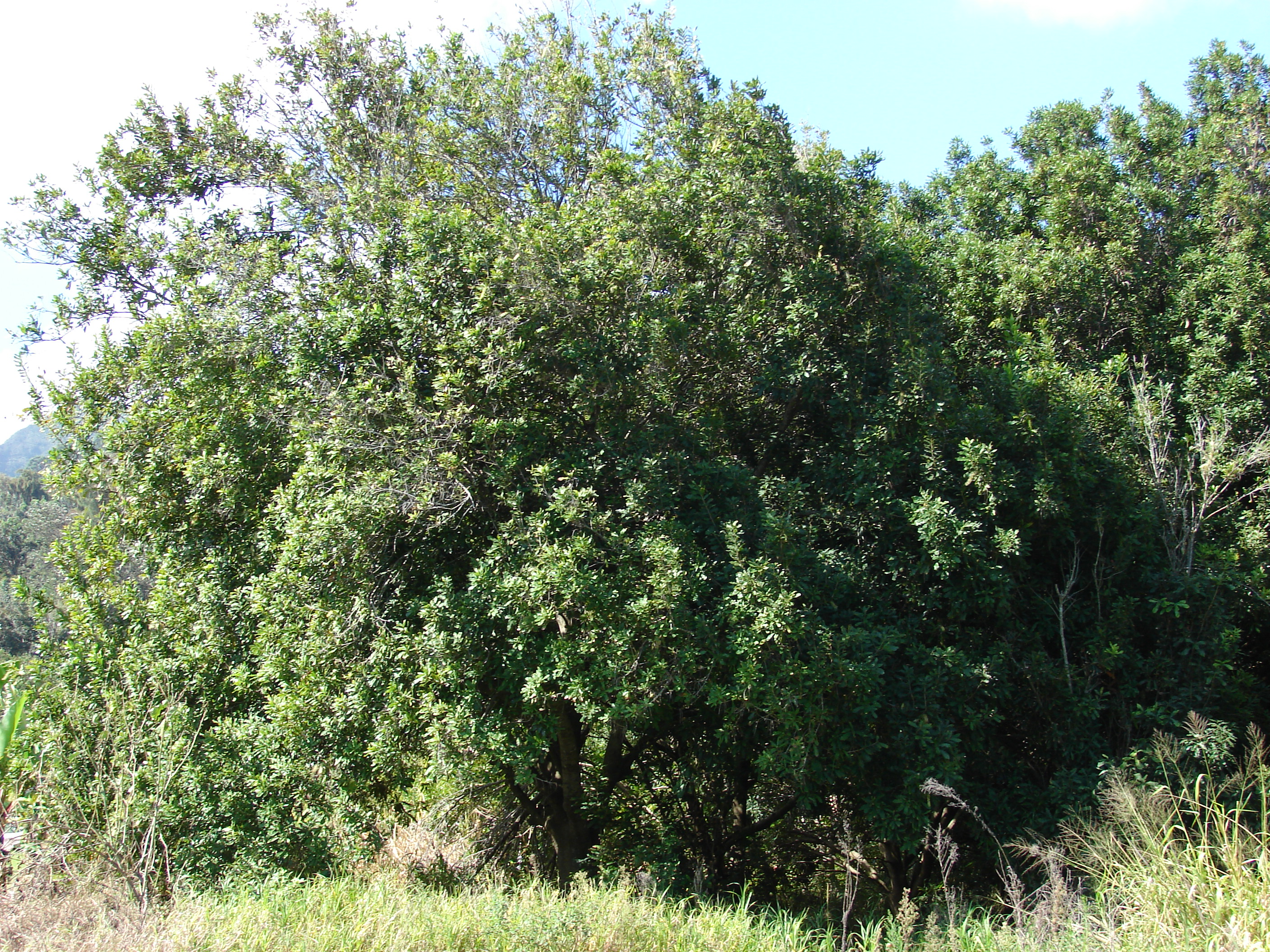
A macadamia tree

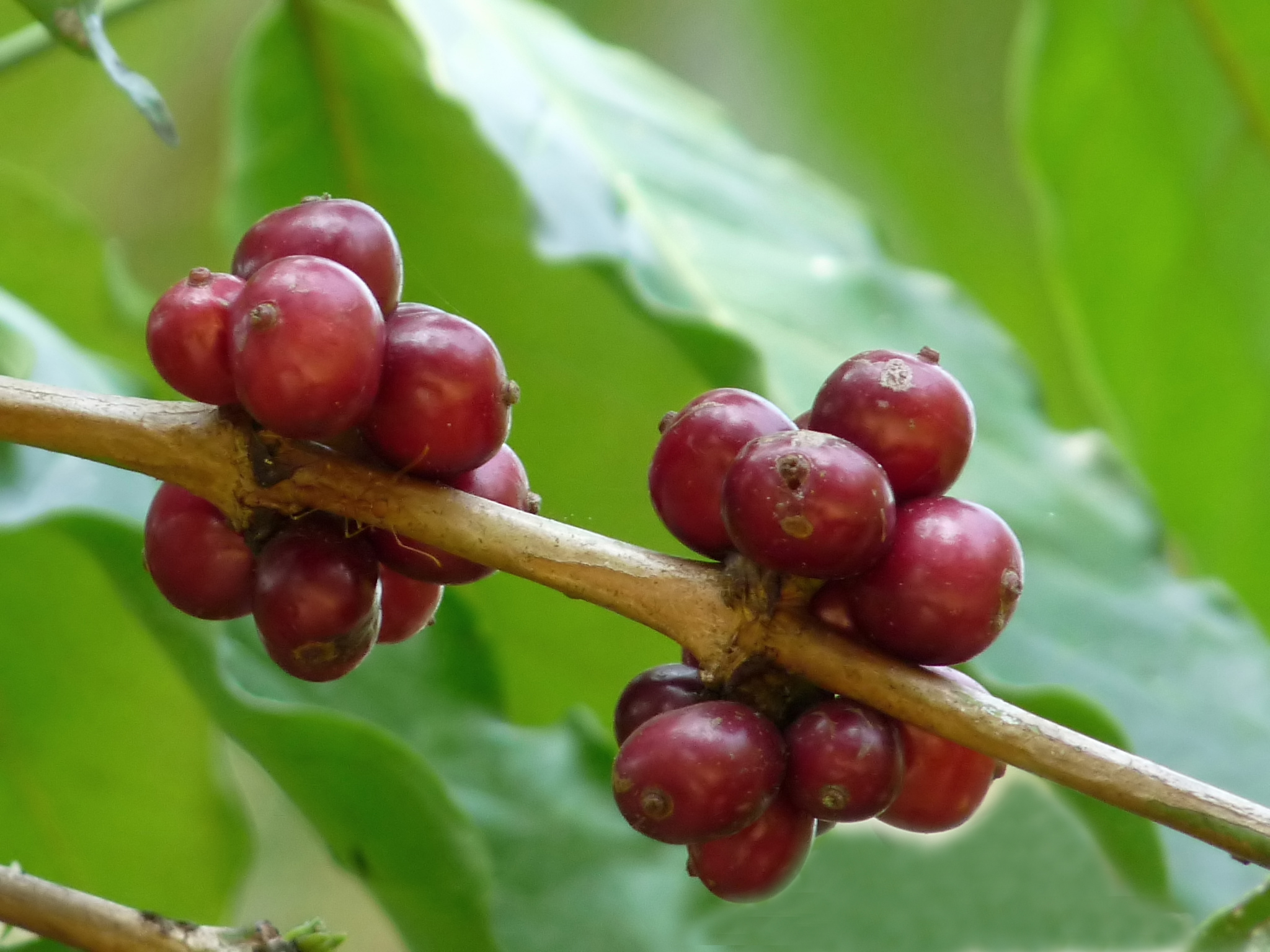
Ripe conilon coffee fruits

- Petroleum and natural gas: The first productive oil and gas fields in Espírito Santo were discovered in São Mateus in 1967. According to the Espírito Santo Institute for Research, Technical Assistance, and Rural Extension (INCAPER), in 2013, an average of 2,800 barrels of oil were produced daily from 150 onshore wells and the Cação Platform, with the municipality accounting for 23% of the state's oil production.
- Silviculture: Eucalyptus is the main crop in the municipality, introduced by Aracruz Celulose in the early 1970s. In 2013, 745,124 cubic meters of this wood were harvested, with 700,581 m³ used for pulp production, 15,537 m³ for charcoal, and 29,006 m³ for various other purposes.
- Coconut: São Mateus is the third-largest producer of coconut in Brazil. In 2010, the municipality produced approximately 75 million fruits annually, representing 3.66% of national production, 25% of the Southeast Region, and about 48% of Espírito Santo's production, using 3,740 ha of planted area.
- Macadamia: Macadamia production makes São Mateus the second-largest producer of this fruit in Brazil. Introduced in the second half of the 1980s, it yielded just over 300 tons annually in 2012, using approximately 500 ha of planted area. Notably, about 98% of this production is exported to the United States and China.
- Coffee: The municipality is notable for producing conilon coffee, being the sixth-largest producer in the state. According to IBGE, in 2013, 21,000 tons of this grain were produced on 12,500 ha, with an average yield of 1,620 kilograms per hectare, generating approximately 82 million reais in revenue.
- Black pepper: Espírito Santo is the second-largest producer of black pepper in Brazil, with São Mateus as its largest producer. In 2013, IBGE estimated a production of 4,480 tons on 1,600 ha, with an average yield of 2,880 kilograms per hectare, generating approximately 52 million reais in revenue.
- Horticulture: Apart from coconut, no other fruit crop stands out significantly. However, in 2013, the municipality produced 6,720 tons of bananas, 900 tons of lemons, 56,700 tons of papayas, 75 tons of mangoes, 6,000 tons of passion fruit, and 210 tons of grapes.
- Animal husbandry: In 2013, IBGE estimated a herd of 88,732 cattle, 5,100 pigs, 2,080 sheep, 227 buffalo, 4,520 horses, 408 goats, and 49,220 birds, including 9,610 hens. The city produced 9,406 liters of milk from 8,509 cows, 27,000 dozen chicken eggs, and 108,000 kilograms of honey. Additionally, 85,000 kilograms of tilapia were produced in captivity.

Secondary and tertiary sectors

In 2010, 6.45% of the employed population worked in the manufacturing industry, with the secondary sector contributing 245,387,000 reais to the municipal GDP, currently the smallest contributor among the three production sectors. Nevertheless, the industrial sector has shown the most growth, driven by the establishment of industrial plants such as the North Espírito Santo Terminal, as well as automobile factories, such as those of Volare and Agrale.

In 2010, among the economically active population, 8.80% worked in construction, 1.06% in public utilities, 15.06% in commerce, and 37.21% in services, with the tertiary sector generating the largest share of the municipal GDP in 2012: R$854,086,000.

== Infrastructure ==
=== Healthcare ===
In 2009, the municipality had 63 healthcare facilities, including hospitals, emergency services, health centers, and dental services, with 32 public and 31 private facilities. These provided 165 beds for hospitalization, with 123 in public facilities and 42 in private ones, the latter also serving the Unified Health System (SUS).

In 2012, 68.8% of births in the municipality were C-sections, and 1% of children were born without prenatal exams. There was one maternal death among 1,748 births, representing a rate of 57.2 deaths per 100,000 births, and 20.5% of children were born to teenage mothers (under 20 years old). In 2013, 96.1% of children under one year old had up-to-date vaccination records.

In 2012, 21 cases of AIDS were reported, with nine in men and twelve in women. In 2011, there were 648 cases of dengue, two of malaria, and one of leishmaniasis.

According to the Brazilian Institute of Geography and Statistics (IBGE), in 2012, there were 512 deaths in São Mateus hospitals, with 384 men and 242 women. The most frequent causes included 167 deaths from respiratory diseases, 124 from circulatory diseases, 72 from digestive diseases, and 58 from external causes such as accidents, injuries, and poisonings.

The city has a public municipal pharmacy providing free medications. Additionally, the municipality conducts vaccination campaigns against influenza in May and against rabies in the same month.

=== Education ===
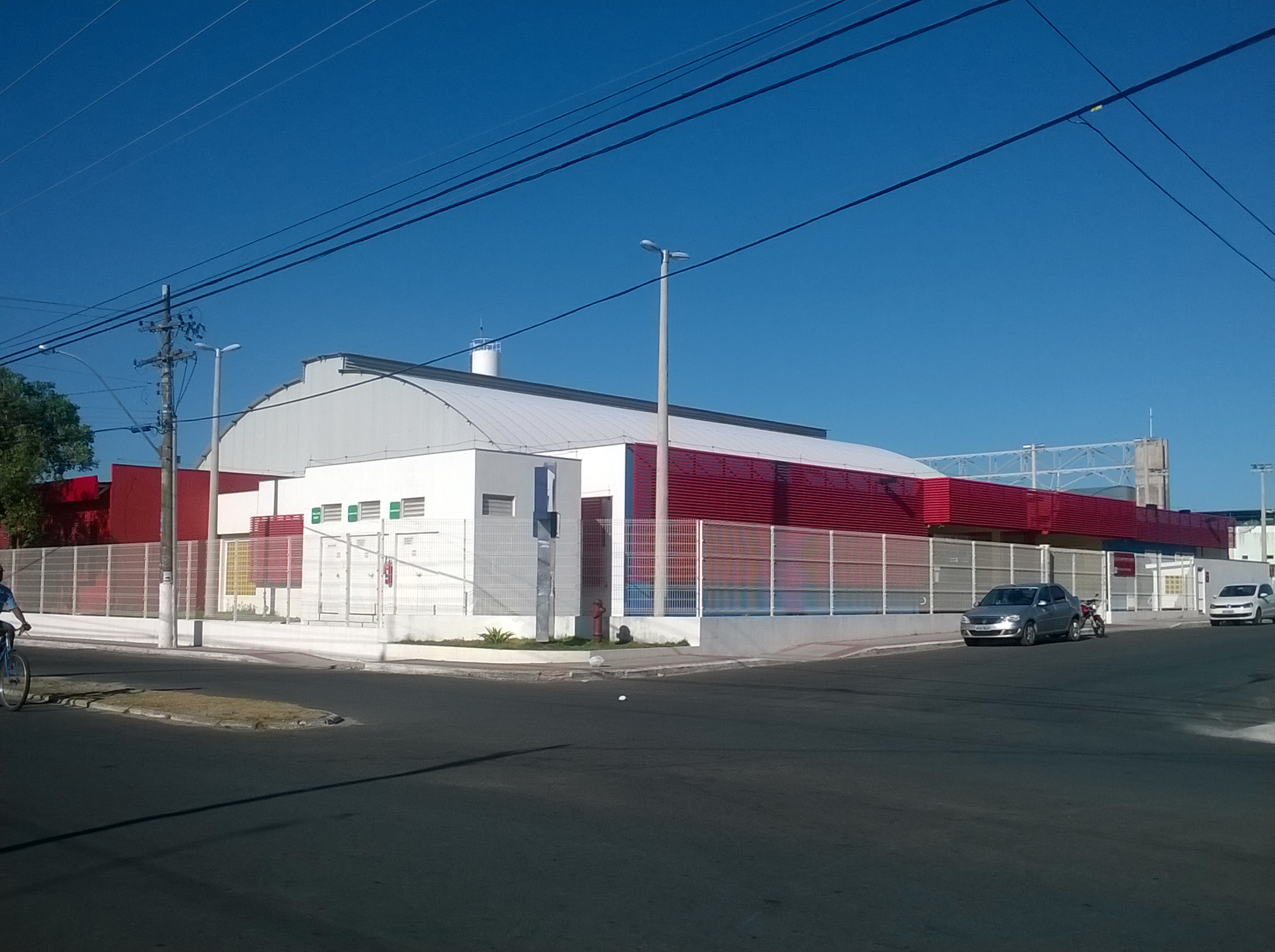
Polivalente School

In 2013, the average Basic Education Development Index (IDEB) for São Mateus public schools was 5.4 for early years and 4.3 for final years. The municipality ranked 2,171 among Brazil's 5,565 municipalities for early years and 2,054 for final years. Among Espírito Santo's 78 municipalities, São Mateus ranked 36th for early years and 30th for final years. The Human Development Index (HDI) for education was 0.655 in 2010, compared to Brazil's 0.849, up from 0.251 in 1991.

In 2012, the municipality had approximately 26,582 enrollments in public and private schools. According to IBGE, of the 81 preschool institutions, 71 were public municipal schools, and 10 were private. Of the 90 elementary schools, 69 were public municipal schools, 11 were public state schools, and 10 were private schools. Of the 13 high schools, six were public state schools, one was a public federal school, and six were private schools. There were 282 preschool teachers, 1,060 elementary school teachers, and 306 high school teachers.

In 2010, 55.68% of youths over 18 had completed elementary education, and 43.49% had completed high school. Additionally, 96.28% of children aged 5 to 6 were attending school.

In 2015, São Mateus had the Espírito Santo Federal Institute (IFES) offering technical education and two federal higher education institutions: the North Espírito Santo University Center (CEUNES), part of the Federal University of Espírito Santo (UFES) and a campus of the Espírito Santo Federal Institute (IFES).

Education in São Mateus in numbers
Level	Enrollments	Teachers	Schools (total)
Early childhood education	3,415	282	81
Primary education	18,609	1,060	90
Secondary education	4,558	306	13

=== Public safety and crime ===
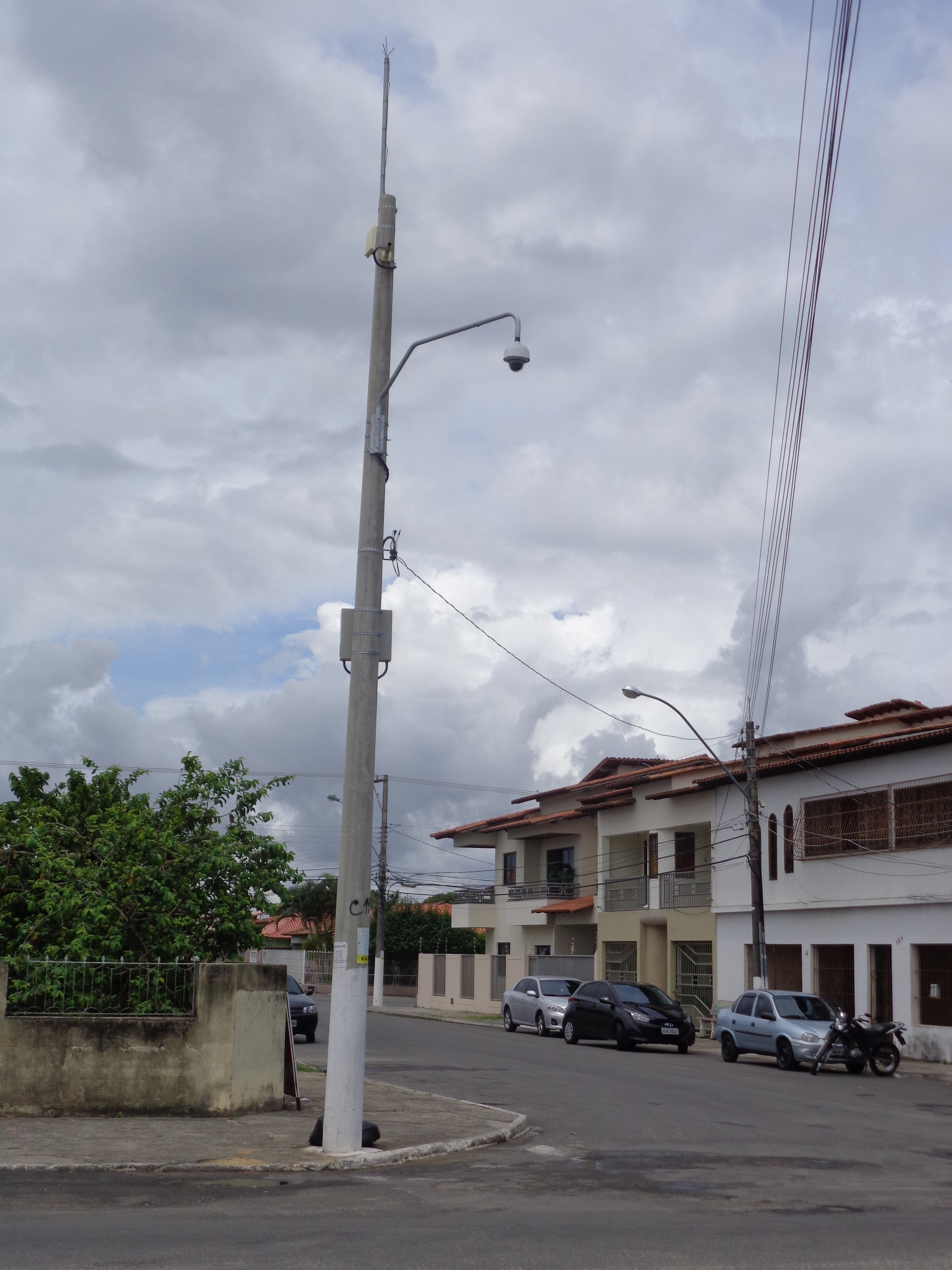
Camera monitoring service in São Mateus

As in most medium and large Brazilian municipalities, crime remains a concern in São Mateus. In 2012, the homicide rate was 68.9 per 100,000 inhabitants, making it the sixth most violent municipality in Espírito Santo and the 93rd in Brazil. Considering citizens identifying as Black or White, the homicide rate was 93.3 per 100,000 for those identifying as Black and 9.5 for those identifying as White. The suicide rate was 3.6 per 100,000 inhabitants, ranking 21st in the state and 1008th nationally. The traffic accident mortality rate was 63.5 per 100,000 inhabitants, the second highest in the state and 54th nationally.

The municipality has two prison facilities. The São Mateus Provisional Detention Center, opened in 2009, has 350 spaces for temporary detainees or those awaiting trial. The São Mateus Regional Penitentiary, managed privately, is recognized as a model for prison management. Opened in 2011, it houses 534 inmates, including 76 women.

In 2011, a Municipal Civil Guard, named Citizen Guard, was established to protect and defend municipal public property and its users.

São Mateus is home to the 13th Battalion of the Military Police of Espírito Santo State. Established on June 22, 2010, from the Fifth Independent Company, it covers São Mateus, Conceição da Barra, Jaguaré, and Pedro Canário. As of January 2015, Lieutenant Alex Voney de Almeida was its commander. The city is also home to the Eighteenth Regional Police Station of the Civil Police and a Federal Police station.

=== Housing, services, and communications ===
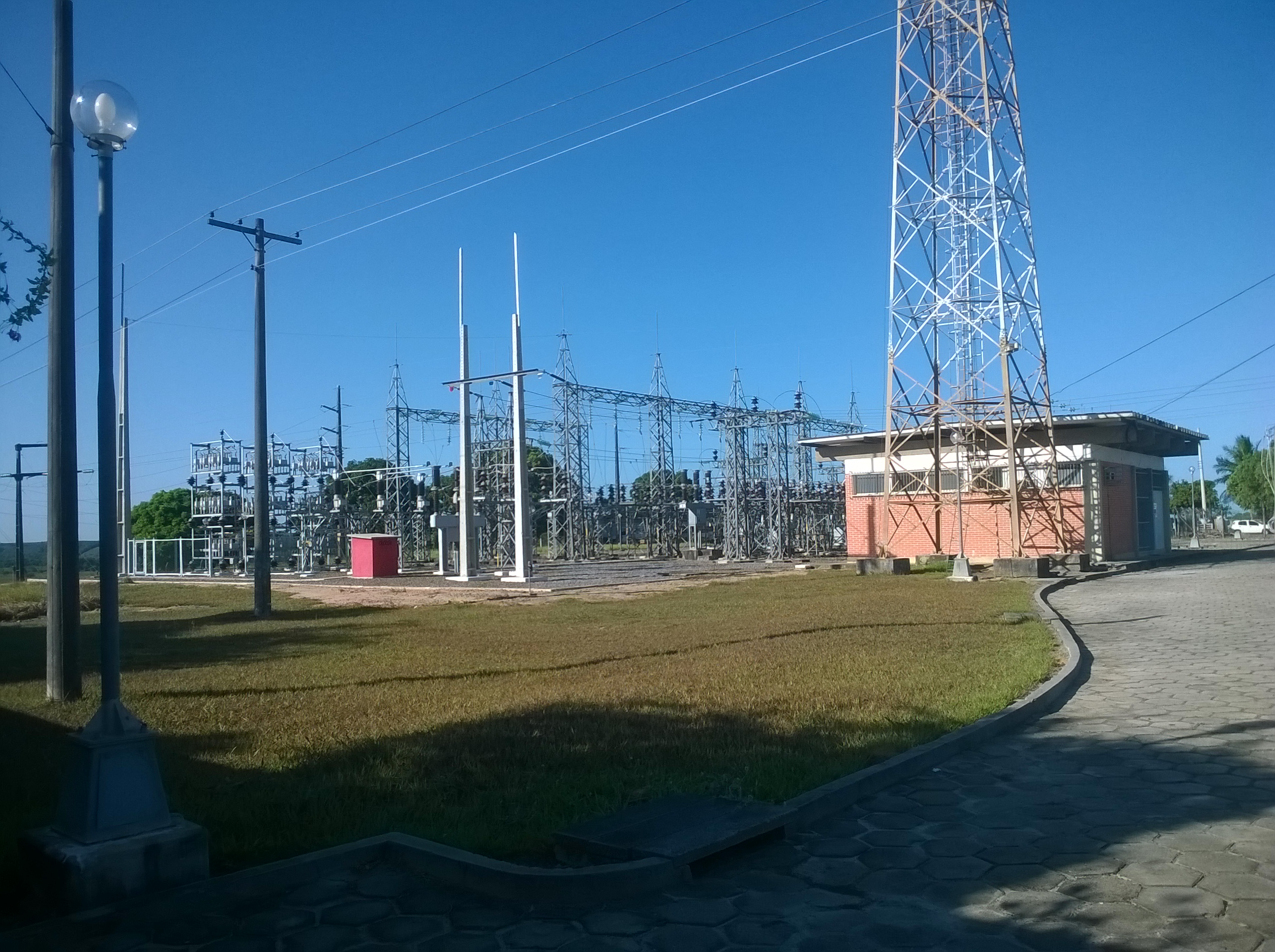
Substation of Escelsa

In 2010, according to IBGE, São Mateus had 32,729 permanent private households, with 25,714 in urban areas and 7,015 in rural areas. Of these, 28,851 were built with coated masonry, 3,456 with uncoated masonry, 167 with reused wood, 97 with prepared wood, 66 with coated stucco, 26 with uncoated stucco, 11 with straw, and 52 with other materials.

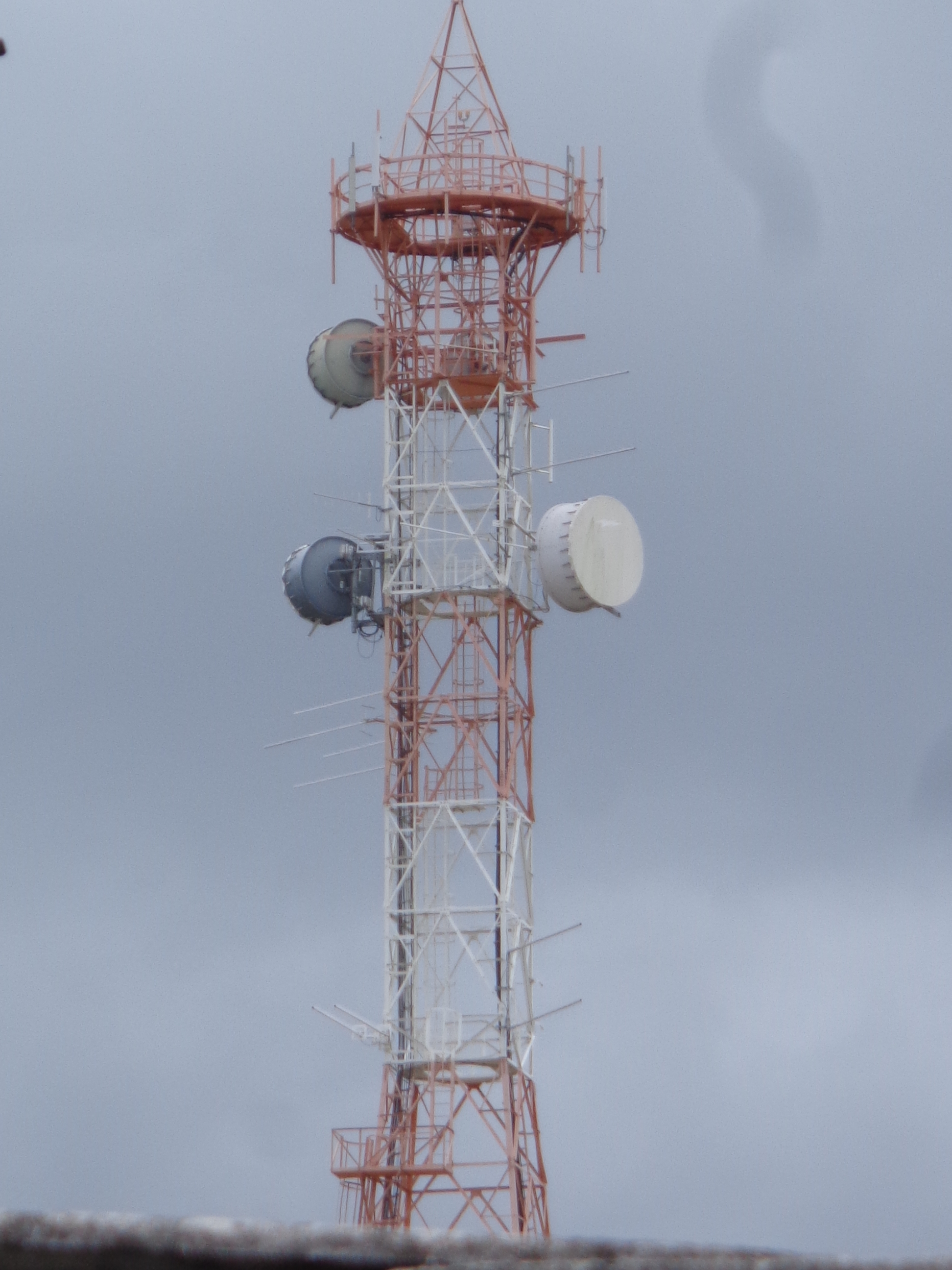
Tower of Oi Telecommunications

In 2010, of the 32,729 households, 30,891 were houses, 1,779 were apartments, 73 were rooms or tenements, and 50 were houses in villages or condominiums. Regarding occupancy, 23,647 households were owned, 5,858 were rented, 3,236 were loaned, and 52 were in other conditions. For water supply, 26,154 households had access to the general network, 6,103 used wells, springs, or cisterns, 223 relied on water trucks, 165 used rainwater stored in cisterns, 24 used rivers, lakes, streams, or creeks, and 124 had other sources. For waste disposal, 27,299 households had garbage collected, 5,142 burned their waste, 221 dumped it on vacant lots, 87 buried it, two disposed of it in rivers or the sea, and 42 used other methods. Finally, 32,664 households had electricity, while 129 did not.

The Autonomous Water and Sewage Service (SAAE) is responsible for water supply and sewage treatment. Currently, SAAE serves 80% of households with treated water. The municipality has two water treatment plants: one in the seat, which draws water from the São Mateus River, and another in Guriri, which draws from the Mariricu River and has equipment for desalinating brackish water during dry periods.

Espírito Santo Centrais Elétricas S.A. (Escelsa), a subsidiary of EDP Brasil, supplies electricity to São Mateus, serving 67 of Espírito Santo’s 78 municipalities. Internet services, including dial-up and broadband (ADSL), are offered by various free and paid providers. Mobile phone services are provided by Claro, Oi, Tim, and Vivo. The area code (DDD) for São Mateus is 027, and the postal code (CEP) ranges from 29930-210 to 29949-990.

In January 2015, São Mateus had two newspapers: Tribuna do Cricaré and Folha Acadêmica. It also had five radio stations, including Rádio Cricaré at 1120 AM and four FM stations: Rádio Ilha 87.9 FM, Rádio Kairós 94.7 FM, Rádio Musical 105.1 FM, and Rádio SIM 105.9 FM.

=== Transportation ===
Air

São Mateus is served by the Tancredo de Almeida Neves Airport. During the 1950s, this aerodrome received regular flights from the now-defunct NAB. Currently, it has no commercial routes but is equipped to handle helicopters and aircraft with up to 50 passengers. Plans exist to extend its runway from 1,350 m to 1,650 m and replace its nighttime lighting, which is currently activated only on request.

Road

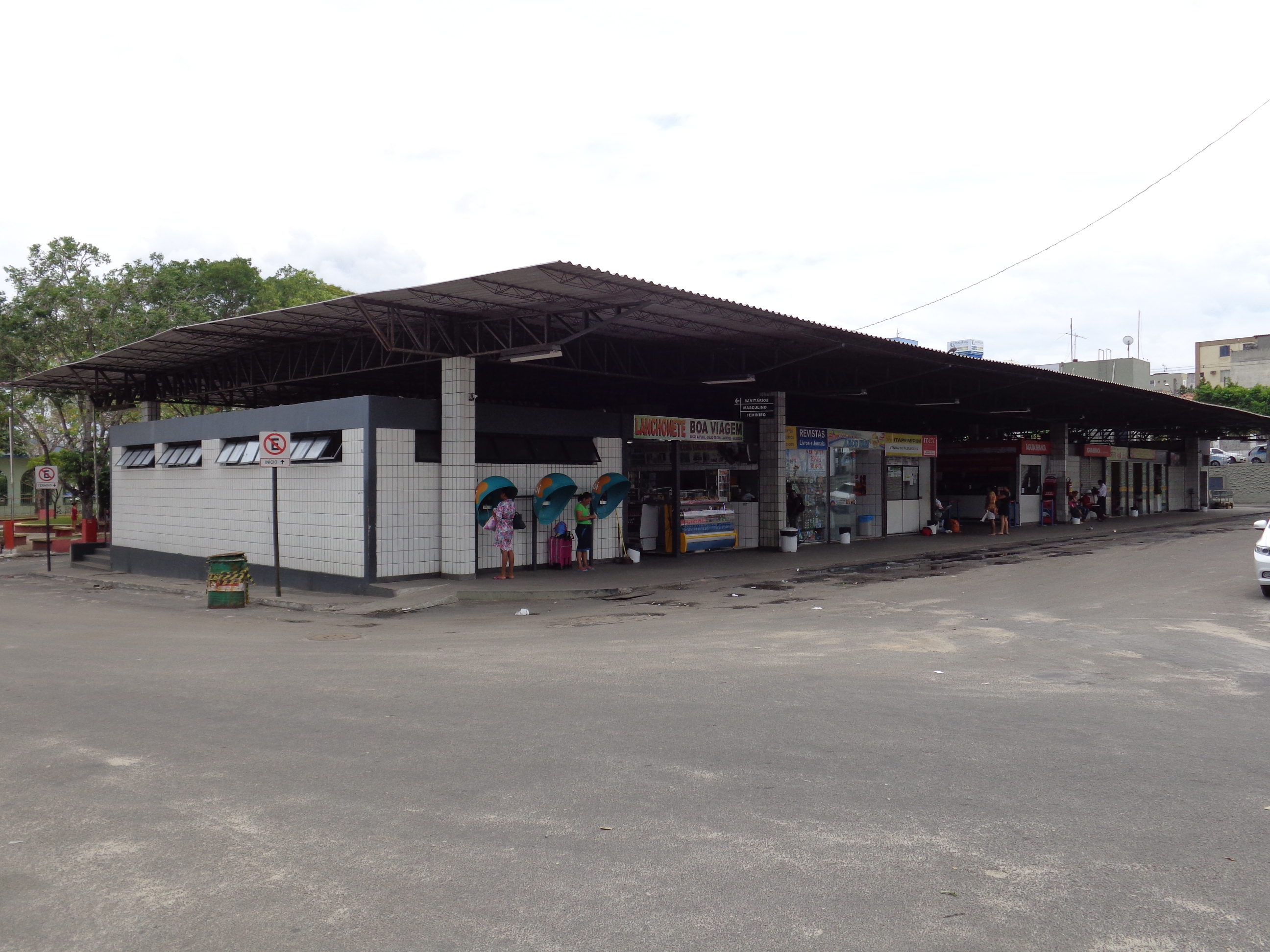
Águia Branca Bus Terminal

São Mateus has a well-developed road network connecting it to various cities within the state and major metropolitan areas of the Southeast Region. The first highway was opened between 1937 and 1938, linking São Mateus to the then-village of Linhares. According to the Espírito Santo Department of Highways (DER-ES), the municipality is crossed by three federal highways: BR-101, which runs along Brazil’s entire coastline and is privatized in Espírito Santo; BR-381, starting in São Mateus and connecting to Minas Gerais and São Paulo; and BR-342, linking Espírito Santo to Bahia. Ten state highways pass through the area, and six of them have been paved. One is still under construction, another is being expanded, and the remaining routes are in natural condition.

São Mateus lacks a public bus terminal, but has two private terminals: one owned by Viação Águia Branca, serving itself and Viação Itapemirim, and another owned by Viação São Gabriel, serving itself, Viação Gontijo, Viação São Geraldo, and Viação Nacional.

Urban

The Municipal Secretariat of Works, Infrastructure, and Transportation oversees traffic control and maintenance, including road inspections, driver and pedestrian behavior, traffic engineering projects, paving, road construction, and management of services such as taxis, alternative transport, buses, charters, and school transport. Public passenger transport has been operated by Viação São Gabriel Ltda. since 1975. The city also offers taxi and motorcycle-taxi services.

In 2013, according to IBGE, the city had a fleet of 40,320 vehicles, including 19,143 cars, 10,806 motorcycles, 3,442 pickup trucks, 3,227 scooters, 1,118 trucks, 659 vans, 371 buses, 164 tractor-trailers, 148 utility vehicles, 117 tractors, and 1,106 other vehicle types.

Railway

From 1923 to 1941, São Mateus was served by the São Mateus Railway, which connected it to Nova Venécia, then a settlement under São Mateus’s jurisdiction.

The railway had a 60 cm gauge and facilitated the transport of timber and coffee from the region to the city’s former river port, as well as local passenger services. It spanned 68 km of track without connecting to other railways.

Its operation was short-lived, ceasing in 1941 when it was dismantled, and its rails and materials were sold by the State Government. The proceeds funded the construction of a water tank in the city, now located near the Municipal Historical Museum.

Few traces of the old railway remain in São Mateus, except for its former headquarters building, repurposed for other uses. The railway’s former trackbed was replaced by the Miguel Curry Carneiro Highway (ES-381), now part of BR-381, with this section owned by the State Government, explaining the name change.

== Culture ==
=== Theater, music, and events ===
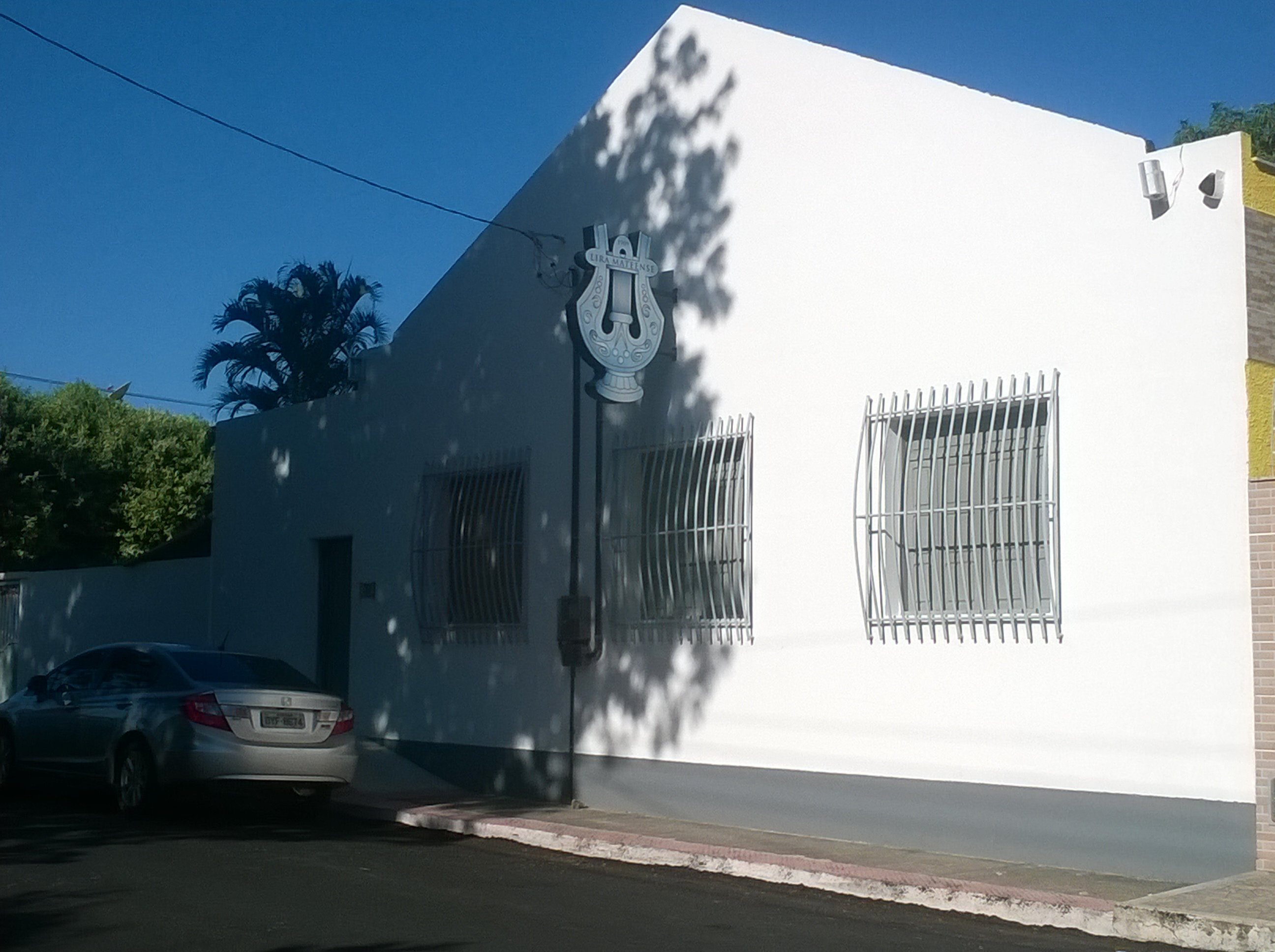
Headquarters of Lira Mateense

São Mateus was the first city in Espírito Santo to have a theater. The city has a history of various theater groups, including the Mateense Amateur Theater Group (GRUMATA), the Improvisando Arte Teatral Group (IMPROART), the Popular Theater Group, the Elenco Theater Academy, the Epic Theater Group, the Gêneses do Interlúdio Theater Company, and the Ascensão Theater Group, which has staged the Passion of Christ in the Ponte neighborhood since 1987.

The city has an orchestra, also serving as a marching band, called Lira Mateense. Founded on September 21, 1909, it is, alongside the Espírito Santo State Symphony Orchestra, one of the state’s two main musical groups. It offers free music education to youths and adults and is currently led by conductor Datan Coelho. Several other popular music bands have gained state and national recognition, including the defunct Bandoasis and Black-Out Band, the former Pinzindim group, and the forró group Trio Chapahalls.

Regarding events, the National Theater Festival (FENATE) is traditionally held in July, featuring street theater performances and performing arts workshops. Performances take place at Mesquita Neto Square in Centro and Largo do Chafariz in the Port of São Mateus, where theater groups compete for the Anchieta Trophy. Other events include festivals for Saint Matthew in September and Saint Benedict in December, the city’s patron saints; the city’s anniversary, celebrated with national shows, agricultural exhibitions, and civic parades, held on September 21 but spanning several days; the Guriri Road Fest, a national motorcycle rally held in Guriri Island since 2003; the Summer Festival, featuring nationally known bands in Guriri; and New Year's Eve, with regional or national artists and fireworks, alongside other smaller events.

=== Tourist attractions ===
São Mateus is among Brazil’s oldest continuously inhabited cities and boasts one of Espírito Santo’s most significant colonial architectural ensembles, the Port buildings, designated a heritage site by the State Culture Council in 1976. In the upper city, the municipality’s oldest heritage assets, built between the 18th and 19th centuries, are located. The municipality also features beaches, rivers, waterfalls, dunes, and mangroves. Notable attractions include:

Natural attractions

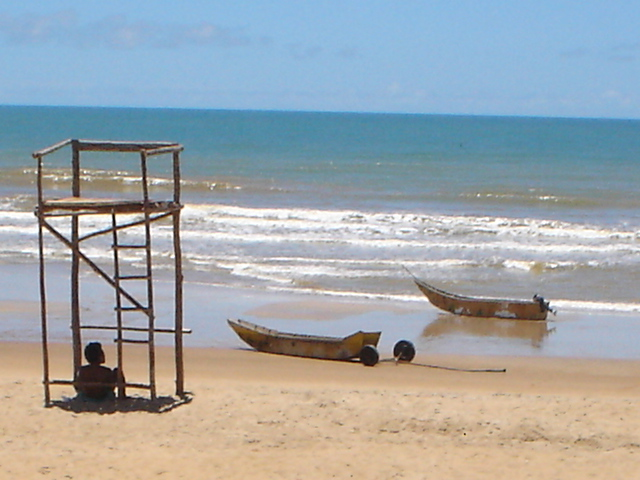
Guriri Beach

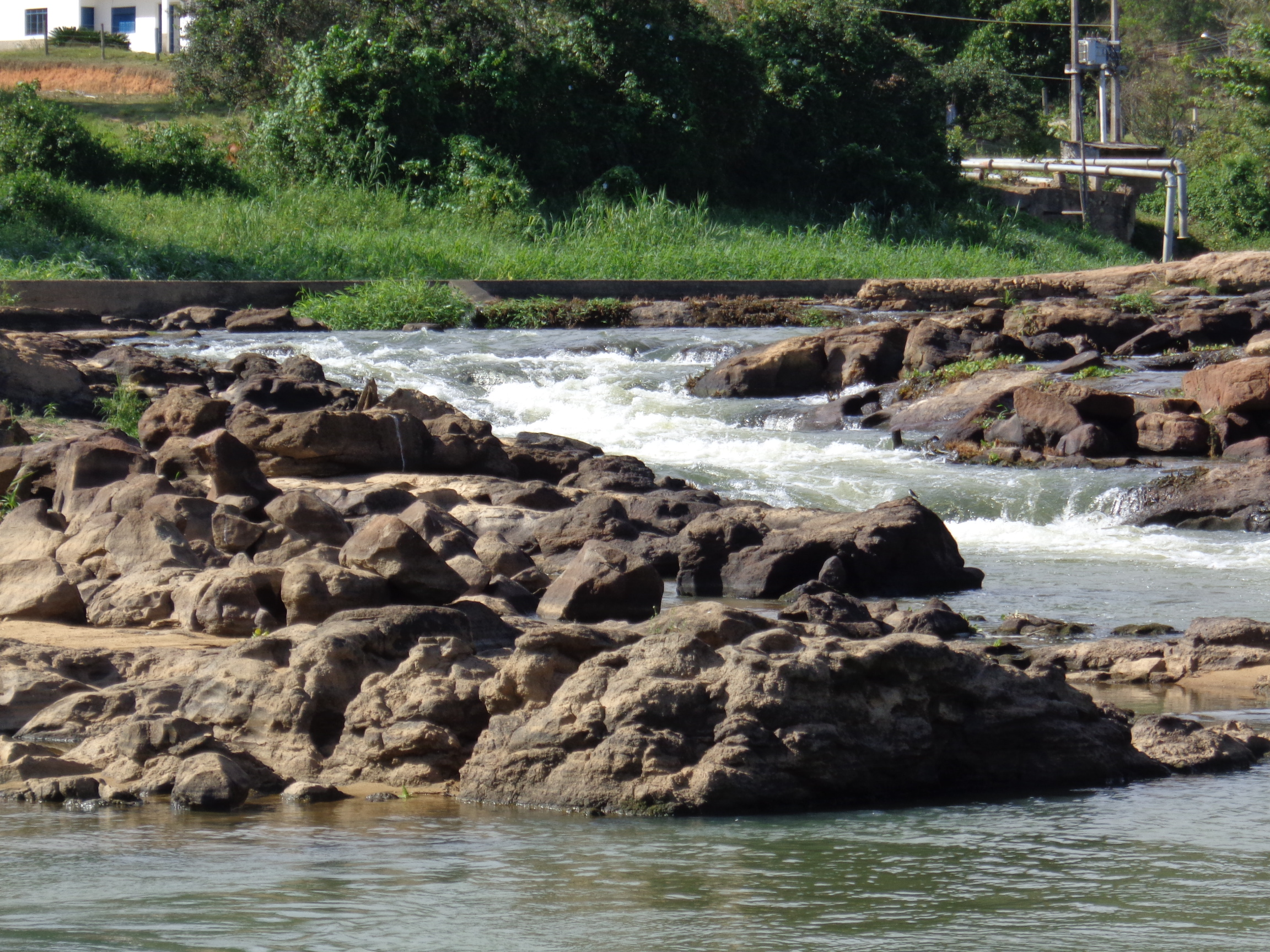
Cravo Waterfall

- Guriri Beach: The municipality’s main beach, located 12 from downtown. It features rough, warm waters forming natural pools at low tide. From September to March, sea turtles nest on the beach, which is recognized for its conservation efforts. These efforts balance high tourist traffic with measures such as adjusted lighting and restricted construction in nesting areas. Four of the world’s seven sea turtle species nest in Guriri.
- Barra Nova Beach: Located 25 km south of Guriri, at the mouth of the Mariricu River. It features a fishing village, mangroves, lagoons, and reefs. The beach formed after an artificial bar was opened by Commander Reginaldo Gomes da Cunha, brother of the Baron of Aymorés, to drain the Suruaca Lagoon for livestock farming.
- Urussuquara Beach: Located near the border with Linhares, characterized by restinga vegetation along the shore, fine yellowish sand in some areas, dunes, mangroves, a stretch of Atlantic Forest, and the mouth of the Barra Seca River. Its strong waves make it an ideal spot for surfing and snook fishing. "Urussuquara" is a Tupi term meaning "large spot-winged wood quail’s den," from uru (spot-winged wood quail), usu (large), and kûara (den).
- Waterfalls: Within the municipality, there are three waterfalls, all located along the São Mateus River: the Cachoeira do Inferno, situated at kilometer 47 of the São Mateus x Nova Venécia Highway, characterized as a rapid stretching over 1,000 meters in length, mistakenly named a waterfall. Its name is linked to the existence of a pool known as Caldeirão do Diabo (Devil’s Cauldron), responsible for the deaths of many swimmers; the Cachoeira da Jararaca, located just downstream from Cachoeira do Inferno, which is the most frequented by swimmers among the three; and the Cachoeira do Cravo, located 3 km from the administrative center of the Nestor Gomes District, distinguished by the large mansion on the banks of the São Mateus River, built in the 19th century by the Baron of Aymorés to serve as a water-powered mill.

=== Cultural Attractions ===
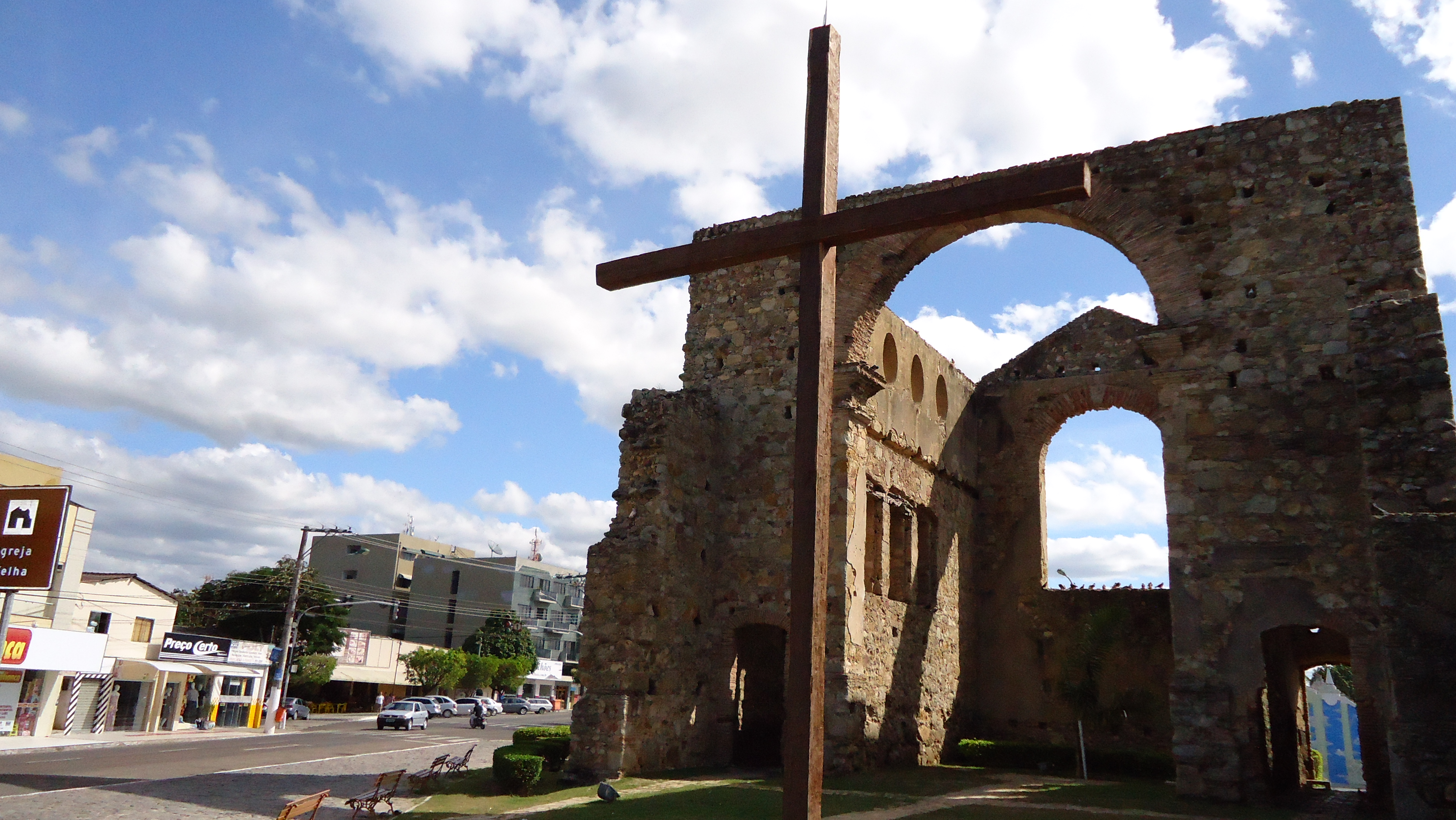
Old Church

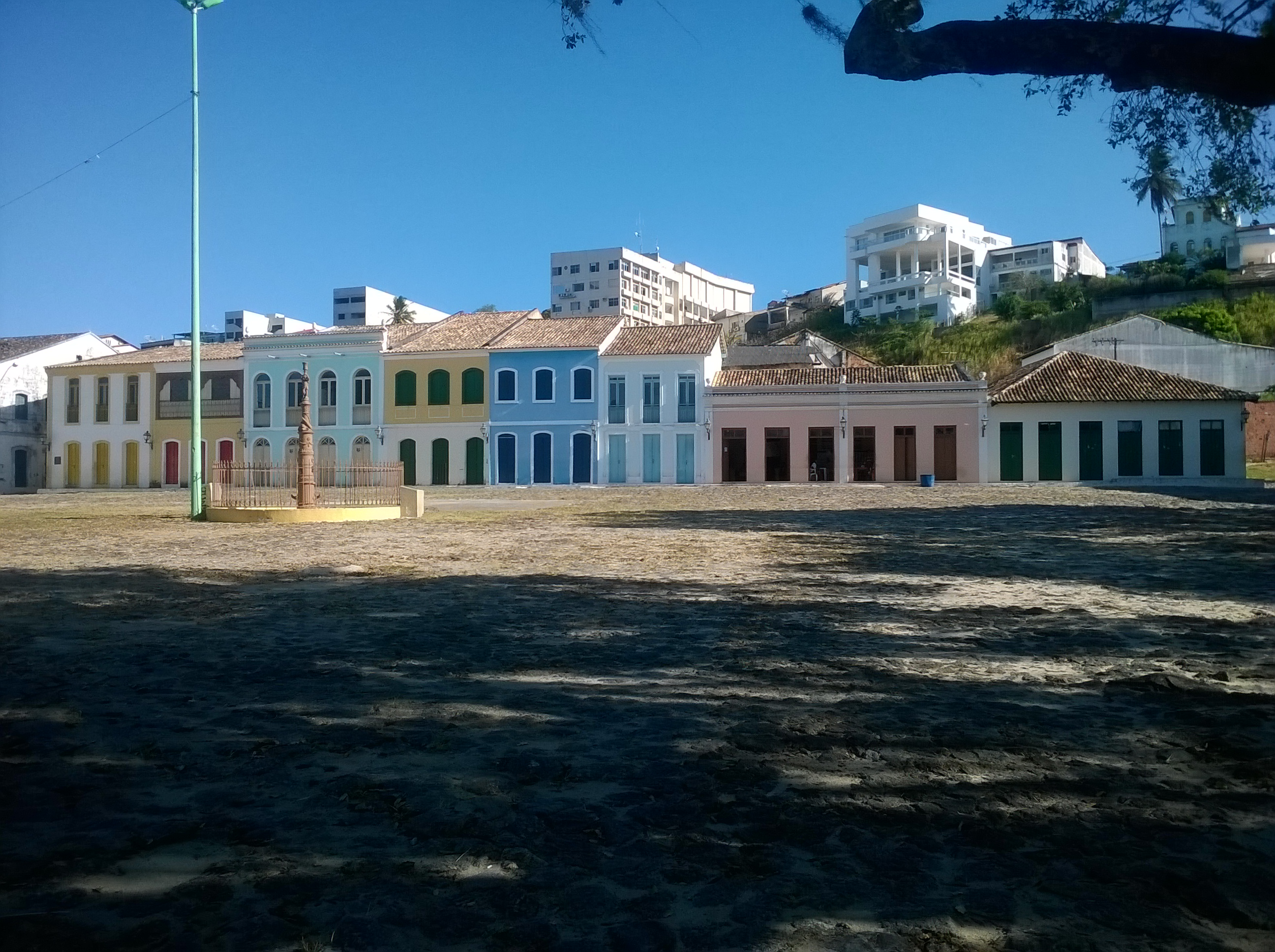
Houses in the Port

- Old Church: The ruins of the Old Church are the symbol of the municipality and its main postcard. Contrary to common belief, it never functioned as a church. Its construction began in the early years of the 19th century at the request of the Jesuits, designed to exceed 300 meters in length. The funding for its construction came from a 1% tax on everything exported through the former Port. However, the project was halted in August 1853 by a decision of the Municipal Council, which argued that expanding the Parish Church would cost five times less and that completing the Old Church would require over 50 years. The construction used stones brought as ballast on ships docking at the port, laid with mortar made from lime and whale oil.
- Houses in the Port: The Houses in the Port of São Mateus are a group of buildings constructed along the banks of the São Mateus River, starting from the late 18th century. Originally, most of these mansions were built with stone masonry, with internal and side walls made of plaster. The construction of these buildings gave rise to a large cluster of houses around a square used for loading and unloading ships docking in São Mateus. With the opening of the first highways, starting in 1938, when the road connecting São Mateus to Linhares was inaugurated, the economic activities at the port began to decline. Ship transport waned, and the old port lost its major commercial houses, which relocated to the upper city. The abandoned mansions were then occupied by prostitutes, leading to architectural modifications in several of them. In 1968, following numerous crimes related to prostitution, the expulsion of prostitutes was ordered, and the mansions were designated as heritage sites by the State Culture Council in 1976.
- Biquinha: This is a water reservoir built in 1880, with a system to capture water from springs located at the base of the São Mateus River valley slope, below the cathedral grounds, to supply drinking water to the port’s fountain. It is part of São Mateus’ Historical Heritage.
- Projeto TAMAR: The research base of TAMAR in Guriri was established in 1988, housing a visitor center that also serves as the Guriri Open Sea Turtle Museum. Key attractions include an aquarium, two turtle observation tanks, and an exhibition of life-sized replicas and silhouettes of the five sea turtle species. During the reproductive season in the summer, the release of hatchlings is organized in the late afternoons.

=== Cuisine ===
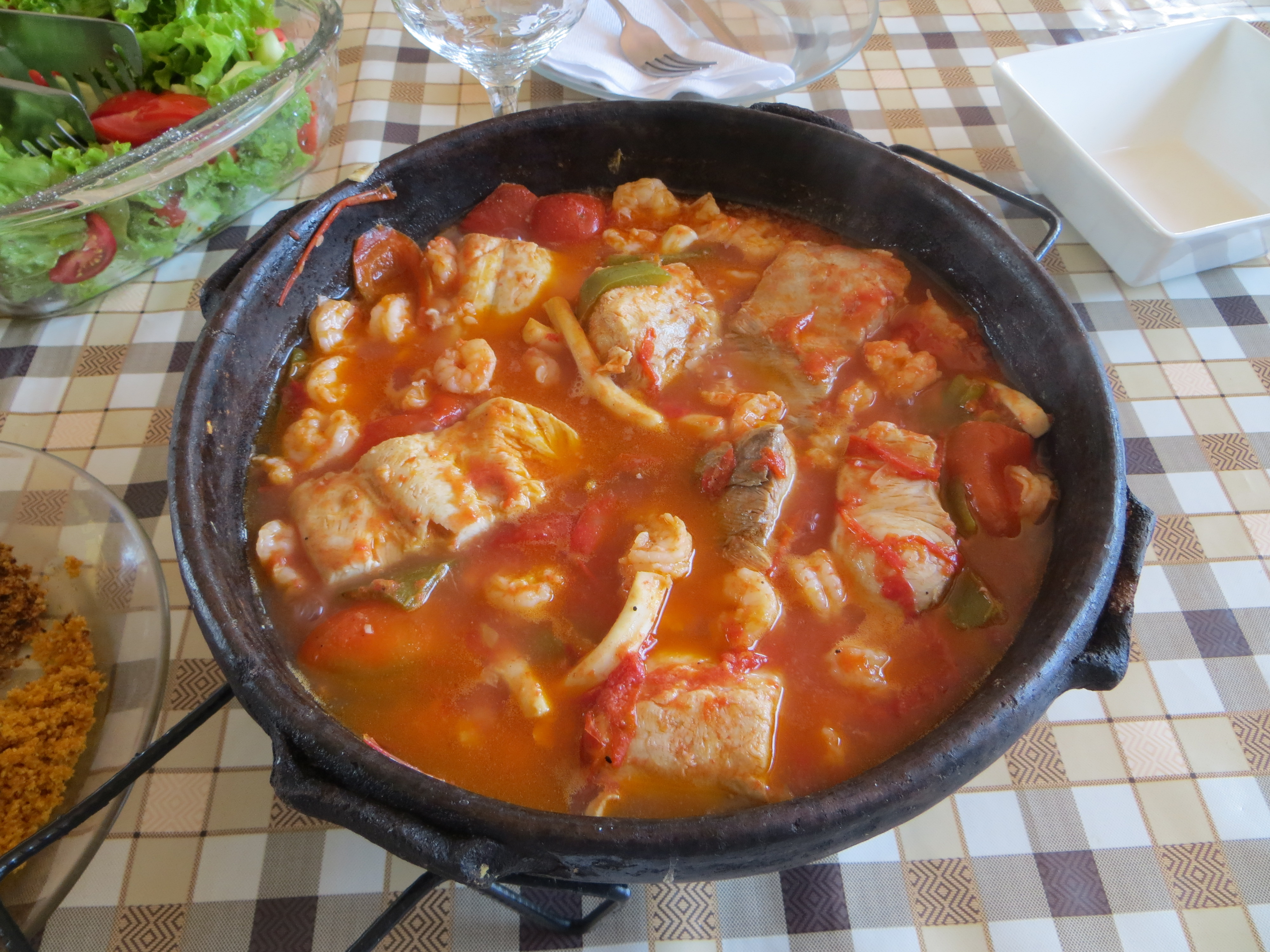
A moqueca capixaba prepared at home in a clay pot

The proximity of São Mateus to other states and the origins of the municipality’s settlers have contributed to a highly diverse cuisine, with a strong Bahian influence, characterized by heavily seasoned dishes, including vatapá, acarajé, mungunzá, caruru, quibebe, moqueca, and seafood from the region. Regarding moqueca, São Mateus offers both the Bahian moqueca, prepared with palm oil, coconut milk, and black pepper, and the traditional moqueca capixaba, which does not use these ingredients and may or may not be accompanied by shrimp sauce.

One of the most traditional delicacies in the municipality is the southern kingcroaker moqueca, a small freshwater fish. This moqueca is not sold in restaurants, being a privilege of the city’s traditional families. Additionally, the municipality consumes various freshwater and marine fish, including snook, hake, catfish, piau, stardrum, and hoplias. Shellfish and crustaceans, such as crabs and mussels, are also highly appreciated.

Products made from cassava, such as cassava flour, beiju, and tapioca, are also characteristic foods of the municipality, prepared artisanally by families descended from quilombolas.

The Italian colonizers contributed to the popularity of pasta dishes, with the municipality widely consuming dishes such as spaghetti, agnolini, pizza, polenta, gnocchi, and pancakes, among others. Some families descended from Italian immigrants still maintain the tradition of preparing a homemade pasta known as tagliatelle.

=== Sports ===
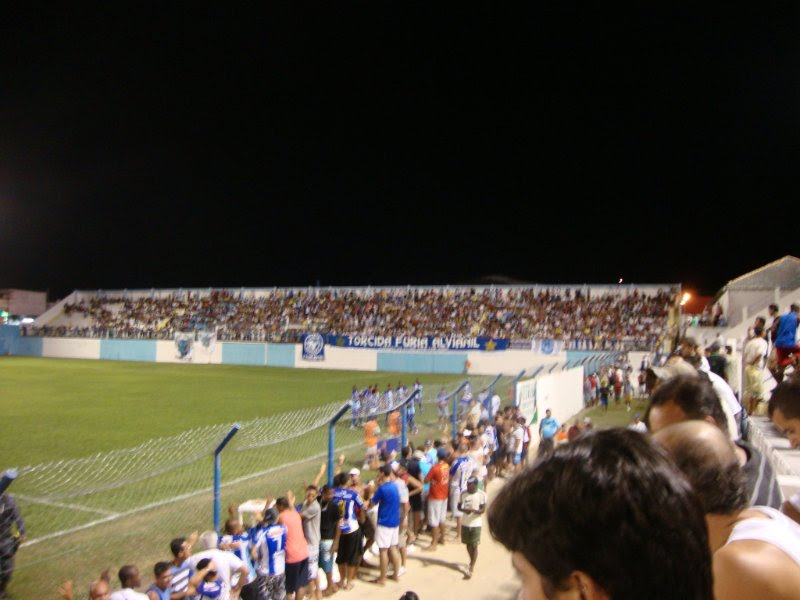
Sernamby Stadium

São Mateus currently has the Associação Atlética São Mateus as its only active professional football club, having previously hosted the activities of the now-defunct Matheense Football Club. The Associação Atlética São Mateus was founded on December 13, 1963, and among its notable campaigns, it participated in the 2011 Brazilian Football Championship – Série D and the 1st Division of the Campeonato Capixaba, winning the championship in 2009 and 2011. Its stadium is the Manoel Moreira Sobrinho Stadium, better known as Sernamby Stadium, with a capacity of 7,500 people.

The Matheense Football Club's founding date is uncertain, but the club was established before 1922. Its best performance in state championships was runner-up in the 1994 Campeonato Capixaba Série B. The club's stadium, "Othovarino Duarte dos Santos," is more commonly known as the "Campo do Matheense." It has a capacity of about 1,000 people and is located in the Sernamby neighborhood.

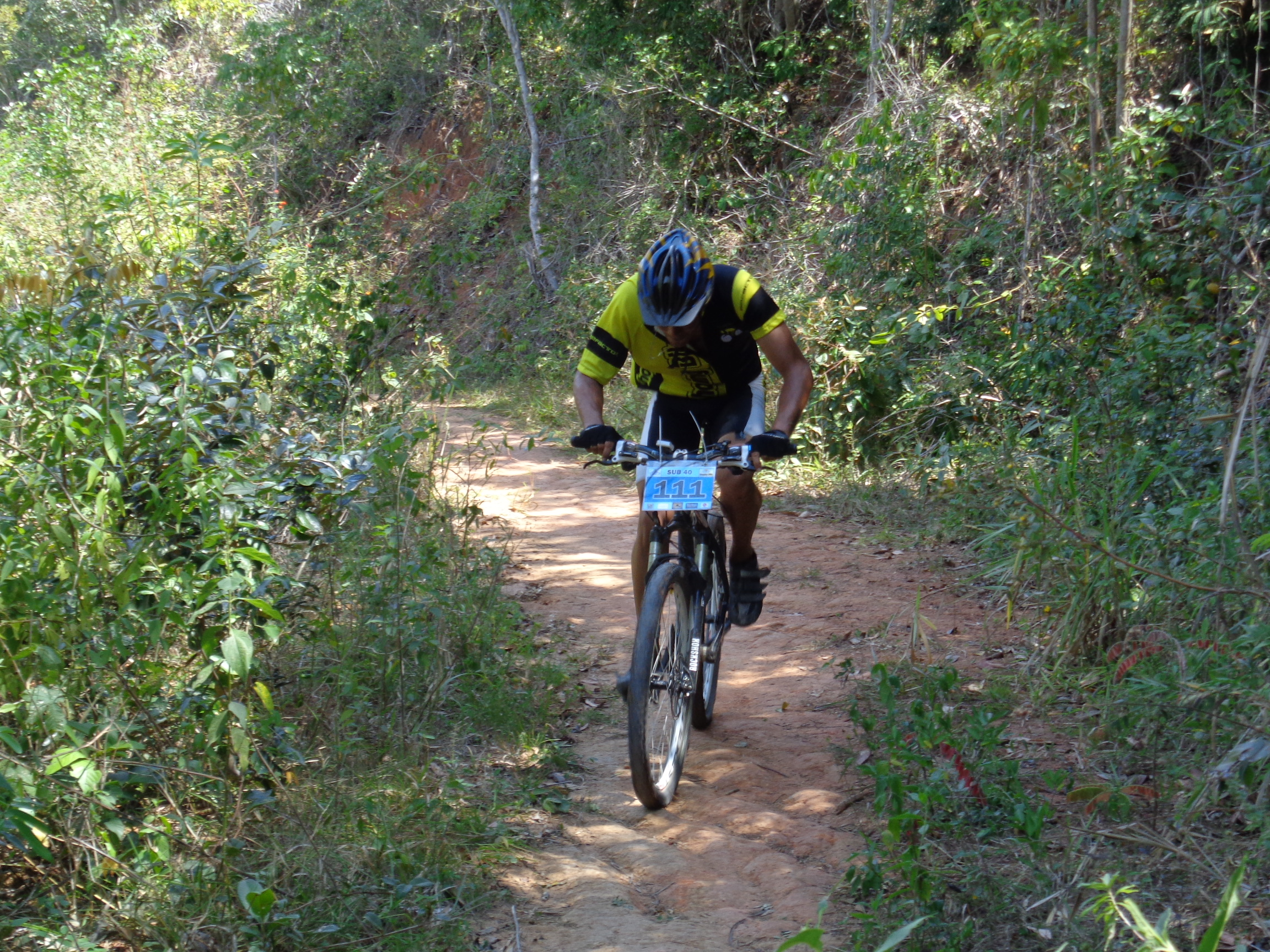
Mountain Bike Competition on the Limão Trail

The city hosts several amateur football championships, with the main ones being: the Copa do Café, which brings together teams from the districts of Nestor Gomes and Nova Verona; the Copa Litoral, which includes teams from the Barra Nova district; the Copa Cidade, which gathers teams from São Mateus neighborhoods; the Copa da Liga, which includes teams from the rural areas of the Seat district; and the Copa dos Campeões, which brings together the champions of these tournaments.

São Mateus regularly hosts competitions in other sports, such as the Northern Capixaba Mountain Bike Cup, with all stages held within the municipality, the Corrida Rústica, held annually on September 21, the Enduro de Verão, an enduro motorcycle competition typically held between January and February, and the Jogos Estudantis Mateenses (JEM), a tournament among the municipality’s schools where students compete in various sports, including volleyball, beach volleyball, handball, futsal, beach soccer, basketball, and judo.

=== Holidays ===
In São Mateus, there are four municipal holidays and eight national holidays, in addition to optional holidays. According to the city hall, the municipal holidays are: Good Friday; Corpus Christi; the city’s anniversary and the day of Saint Matthew the Evangelist on September 21; and the day of Saint Benedict on December 27. According to federal law No. 9,093, approved on September 12, 1995, municipalities may have a maximum of four municipal holidays with a religious scope, including Good Friday.

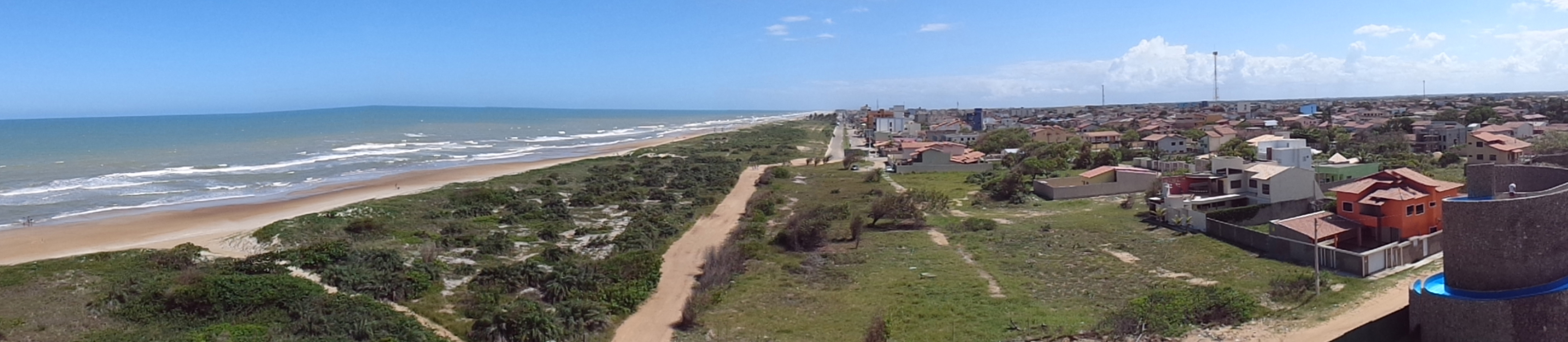
Panoramic view of the Guriri coastline

== See also ==
- List of municipalities in Espírito Santo
- List of municipalities in Brazil
- People from São Mateus
- List of municipalities in Brazil by population
