= Preto River =

Preto River or Prêto River may refer to these rivers in Brazil:

== Amapá ==
- Preto River (Amapá)

== Amazonas ==
- Preto da Eva River
- Preto River (Padauari River tributary)
- Preto River (Unini River tributary)

== Bahia ==
- Preto River (Bahia, Atlantic Ocean)
- Preto River (Bahia, Grande River tributary)
- Preto River (Bahia, Jequié River tributary)

== Espírito Santo ==
- Preto River (Cricaré River tributary)
- Preto River (Espírito Santo), Itabapoana River tributary
- Preto River (Itabapoana River tributary), west of the above
- Preto River (Itaúnas River tributary)
- Preto River (Mariricu River tributary)

== Goiás ==
- Preto River (Paracatu River tributary)
- Preto River (Paranaíba River tributary)
- Preto River (Tocantins River tributary)

== Maranhão ==
- Preto River (Maranhão)

== Minas Gerais ==
- Preto River (Araçuaí River tributary)
- Preto River (Paraibuna River tributary)

== Paraíba ==
- Preto River (Paraíba)

== Paraná ==
- Preto River (Paraná)

== Pernambuco ==
- Preto River (Pernambuco)

== Rio de Janeiro ==
- Preto River (Piabanha River tributary)
- Preto River (Ururaí River tributary)

== Rondônia ==
- Preto de Candeias River
- Preto do Crespo River
- Preto River (Rondônia)

== Roraima ==
- Preto River (Roraima)

== Santa Catarina ==
- Preto River (Negro River tributary)
- Preto River (Do Peixe River tributary)

== São Paulo ==
- Preto River (São Paulo)

== See also ==
- Preto (disambiguation)
- Rio Preto (disambiguation)
- Río Prieto (disambiguation)
