= São João River =

There are several rivers named São João River in Brazil:

- São João River (Canoas River tributary), Santa Catarina state
- São João River (Cubatão River tributary), Paraná state
- São João River (Iguazu River tributary), Paraná state
- São João River (Ji-Paraná River tributary), Rondônia state
- São João River (Mato Grosso do Sul), Mato Grosso do Sul state
- São João River (Mato Grosso), Mato Grosso state
- São João River (Minas Gerais), Minas Gerais state
- São João River (Negro River tributary), Santa Catarina state
- São João River (Paraná River tributary), Paraná state
- São João River (Dos Patos River tributary), Paraná state
- São João River (Pernambuco)
- São João River (Pitangui River tributary), Paraná state
- São João River (Rio de Janeiro), Rio de Janeiro state
- São João River (Verde River tributary), Rondônia state
- Igarapé São João
- São João da Barra River, Mato Grosso state
- São João de Meriti River, Rio de Janeiro state
- São João do Paraíso River, Minas Gerais state
- São João Grande River, Espírito Santo state
- São João Pequeno River, Espírito Santo state
- São João Surrá River, Paraná state
