= Rio Preto National Forest =

- Floresta Nacional do Rio Preto
- IUCN category VI (protected area with sustainable use of natural resources)
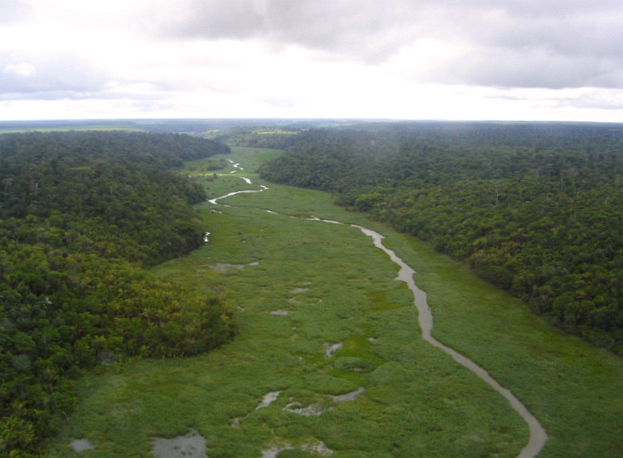
- View of the Preto River from the air in 2008

- Location within Brazil
- Nearest city: Conceição da Barra, Espírito Santo
- Coordinates: 18°23′10″S 39°51′00″W
- Area: 2,817.40 hectares (6,961.9 acres)
- Designation: National forest
- Created: 17 January 1990
- Administrator: ICMBio

The Rio Preto National Forest (Portuguese: Floresta Nacional do Rio Preto) is a national forest in the state of Espírito Santo, Brazil.

== Location ==
The Rio Preto National Forest is in the Conceição da Barra municipality of the state of Espírito Santo. It is 56 kilometres (35 mi) from the seat of the municipality. It contains fragments of the Atlantic Forest and covers 2,817.40 hectares (6,961.9 acres). It was created by decree nº 98.845 of 17 January 1990. It became part of the Central Atlantic Forest Ecological Corridor, created in 2002. It is administered by the Chico Mendes Institute for Biodiversity Conservation (ICMBio).

The forest contains dense tropical lowland rainforest. 338 species of arboreal plants have been identified. The forest has been affected by forest fires and selective logging, and contains 58 hectares (140 acres) of the exotic Eucalyptus citriodora. Plant species include cariniana, pequi (Caryocar brasiliense), ipe (handroanthus), cedar, cinnamon, peroba, paraju, juçara (Euterpe edulis), copal, braúna and peroba. Fauna include armadillos, pacas, deer, otters, marmosets, Brazilian squirrels, lizards, parrots and toucans.

== Conservation ==
The Rio Preto National Forest is classed as IUCN protected area category VI (protected area with sustainable use of natural resources). The objective is sustainable multiple use of forest resources and scientific research, with emphasis on methods for sustainable exploitation of native forests. The site is only open to scheduled school visits.

The management plan for the forest was published in 1999, before the 2000 law 9.985 defined the National System of Conservation Units and provided for buffer zones. In January 2014 the Federal Public Ministry in Espírito Santo gained a court ruling that ICMBio had 180 days to delimit buffer zones around the Rio Preto National Forest as well as the nearby 1,504 hectares (3,720 acres) Córrego Grande Biological Reserve and the 1,850 hectares (4,600 acres) Córrego do Veado Biological Reserve. A buffer zone is an area around a conservation unit where human activity is subject to various rules and restrictions.

Protected species include cougar (Puma concolor), oncilla (Leopardus tigrinus), ocelot (Leopardus pardalis), Atlantic titi or masked titi (Callicebus personatus), maned sloth (Bradypus torquatus), giant armadillo (Priodontes maximus), ringed woodpecker (Celeus torquatus), black-headed berryeater (Carpornis melanocephala), red-browed amazon (Amazona rhodocorytha), white-eared parakeet or maroon-faced parakeet (Pyrrhura leucotis), ochre-marked parakeet (Pyrrhura cruentata),

== Sources ==
- "ES: ICMBio terá que delimitar zona de amortecimento de três unidades de conservação", Eco Debate (in Portuguese), 29 January 2014
- Flona do Rio Preto (in Portuguese), Chico Mendes Institute for Biodiversity Conservation, archived from the original on 2019-06-27
- "Floresta Nacional do Rio Preto", SouES (in Portuguese), Visão Mídia e Entretenimento LTDA, archived from the original on 2020-08-14
- Lamas, Ivana Reis; Crepaldi, Maria Otávia; Mesquita, Carlos Alberto Bernardo (2015), Uma Rede no Corredor (PDF) (in Portuguese), Conservação Internacional (CI-Brasil), ISBN 978-85-98830-28-5, archived from the original (PDF) on 2019-03-29
- Unidade de Conservação: Floresta Nacional de Rio Preto (in Portuguese), MMA: Ministério do Meio Ambiente
