= Veado River =

Veado River may refer to these rivers in Brazil:

- Veado River (Itabapoana River) in Espírito Santo
- Veado River (Santo Antônio River) also in Espírito Santo
- Do Veado River in Paraná state
