= Calçado River =

Calçado River may refer to:

== Brazil ==
- Calçado River (Itabapoana River tributary), in Espírito Santo
- Calçado River (Jacarandá River tributary), in Espírito Santo
- Calçado River (Rio de Janeiro), a tributary of the Paraíba do Sul
