= Córrego do Veado Biological Reserve =

Biological reserve in Espírito Santo, Brazil

- Reserva Biológica do Córrego do Veado
- IUCN category Ia (strict nature reserve)
- Location within Brazil
- Nearest city: Pinheiros, Espírito Santo
- Coordinates: 18.338°S 40.146°W
- Area: 2,357 hectares (5,820 acres)
- Designation: Biological reserve
- Created: 23 April 1984

Córrego do Veado Biological Reserve (Portuguese: Reserva Biológica do Córrego do Veado) is a biological reserve in the municipality of Pinheiros, Espírito Santo, Brazil.

== Location ==
The reserve of 2,357 hectares (5,820 acres) was created by decree 87.590 of 20 September 1982 and decree 89.569 of 23 April 1984. It is managed by the Instituto Chico Mendes de Conservação da Biodiversidade. It became part of the Central Atlantic Forest Ecological Corridor, created in 2002. It is named after the river of the same name, the Veado River, which flows through the reserve from west to east. It lies in the Pinheiros municipality of Espírito Santo. The vegetation is semi-deciduous tropical rain forest, with very tall trees and sparse undergrowth. Although in the tropical zone, the climate is greatly influenced by the mountains.

== Conservation ==
The Biological Reserve is a "strict nature reserve" under IUCN protected area category Ia. The reserve was created to preserve a remnant of Atlantic forest in the northern part of the state.

In January 2014 the Federal Public Ministry in Espírito Santo gained a court ruling that ICMBio had 180 days to delimit buffer zones around the Córrego do Veado Biological Reserve as well as the nearby 2,830 hectares (7,000 acres) Rio Preto National Forest and the 1,504 hectares (3,720 acres) Córrego Grande Biological Reserve. A buffer zone is an area around a conservation unit where human activity is subject to various rules and restrictions.

Protected species in the Atlantic Forest biome are northern brown howler (Alouatta guariba guariba), oncilla (Leopardus tigrinus), red-browed amazon (Amazona rhodocorytha), scalloped antbird (Myrmeciza ruficauda), white-eared parakeet (Pyrrhura leucotis) and ochre-marked parakeet (Pyrrhura cruentata).

== Sources ==
- "ES: ICMBio terá que delimitar zona de amortecimento de três unidades de conservação", Eco Debate (in Portuguese), 29 January 2014
- Lamas, Ivana Reis; Crepaldi, Maria Otávia; Mesquita, Carlos Alberto Bernardo (2015), Uma Rede no Corredor (PDF) (in Portuguese), Conservação Internacional (CI-Brasil), ISBN 978-85-98830-28-5
- Rebio do Córrego do Veado (in Portuguese), Instituto Chico Mendes de Conservação da Biodiversidade.
- "Reserva Biológica do Córrego do Veado", Viarural, archived from the original on 2016-04-23
- Unidade de Conservação: Reserva Biológica do Córrego do Veado (in Portuguese), MMA: Ministério do Meio Ambiente
