= Augusto Ruschi Biological Reserve =

- IUCN category Ia (strict nature reserve)
- Location within Brazil
- Coordinates: 19.905°S 40.562°W
- Area: 3,562 hectares (8,800 acres)
- Designation: Federal Biological Reserve
- Created: 20 September 1982

Augusto Ruschi Biological Reserve (Portuguese: Reserva Biológica Augusto Ruschi) is a Federal biological reserve in the state of Espírito Santo, Brazil. It holds dense rainforest of the Atlantic Forest biome.

== History ==
The reserve covers 3,562 hectares (8,800 acres) in the Atlantic Forest biome. It was created on 20 September 1982 and is administered by the Chico Mendes Institute for Biodiversity Conservation. It became part of the Central Atlantic Forest Ecological Corridor, created in 2002. The reserve is classified as International Union for Conservation of Nature (IUCN) category Ia (strict nature reserve). It is in the Santa Teresa municipality of Espírito Santo state.

== Status ==
The reserve is mostly covered in dense rainforest, with many species of flora, some of which are rare. The terrain is rugged, with altitudes ranging from 90 to 1,100 metres (300 to 3,610 ft). Streams rising in the reserve flow into the Doce, Timbuí and Piraqueaçú rivers.

Protected birds in the reserve include the red-browed amazon (Amazona rhodocorytha), white-necked hawk (Leucopternis lacernulatus), Atlantic black-breasted woodpecker (Celeus torquatus tinnunculus), rufous-brown solitaire (Cichlopsis leucogenys), purple-winged ground dove (Claravis godefrida), black-bellied thorntail (Discosura langsdorffi), Salvadori's antwren (Myrmotherula minor) and brown-backed parrotlet (Touit melanonotus). Protected mammals include the maned sloth (Bradypus torquatus), Atlantic titi (Callicebus personatus), northern muriqui (Brachyteles hypoxanthus), buffy-headed marmoset (Callithrix flaviceps), ocelot (Leopardus pardalis) and cougar (Puma concolor capricornensis). Other protected species include the black uruçu (Melipona capixaba) and pinthous mimic white (Moschoneura pinthous methymna).

== Sources ==
- Lamas, Ivana Reis; Crepaldi, Maria Otávia; Mesquita, Carlos Alberto Bernardo (2015), Uma Rede no Corredor (PDF) (in Portuguese), Conservação Internacional (CI-Brasil), ISBN 978-85-98830-28-5
- Rebio de Augusto Ruschi (in Portuguese), Chico Mendes Institute for Biodiversity Conservation, archived from the original on 2016-03-03
- Unidade de Conservação: Reserva Biológica Augusto Ruschi (in Portuguese), MMA: Ministério do Meio Ambiente
