= Itauninha River =

River in Espírito Santo, Brazil

Location
- Country: Brazil

Physical characteristics
- Source
  - location: Espírito Santo state
- Mouth: Braço Norte do Rio Itaúnas
  - coordinates: 17°57′S 40°29′W

The Itauninha River is a river of Espírito Santo state in eastern Brazil.

== See also ==
- List of rivers of Espírito Santo
