= Dois de Setembro River =

Location
- Country: Brazil

Physical characteristics
- Source
  - location: Espírito Santo state
- Mouth: Braço Norte do Rio São Mateus
  - coordinates: 18°22′S 40°36′W

The Dois de Setembro River is a river of Espírito Santo state in eastern Brazil.

== See also ==
- List of rivers of Espírito Santo
