= Fundo River (Espírito Santo) =

Location
- Country: Brazil

Physical characteristics
- Source
  - location: Espírito Santo state
- Mouth: Jucu Braço Sul River
  - coordinates: 20°24′S 40°42′W

The Fundo River is a river within the Espírito Santo state in eastern Brazil.

== See also ==
- List of rivers of Espírito Santo
