= São Domingos Grande River =

Location
- Country: Brazil

Physical characteristics
- Source
  - location: Espírito Santo state
- Mouth: Guandu River
  - coordinates: 19°58′S 41°7′W

The São Domingos Grande River is a river of Espírito Santo state in eastern Brazil.

== See also ==
- List of rivers of Espírito Santo
