= Da Prata River (Espírito Santo) =

Location
- Country: Brazil

Physical characteristics
- Source
  - location: Espírito Santo state
- Mouth: Gemuuma River
  - coordinates: 19°46′S 40°6′W

The Da Prata River is a river of Espírito Santo state in eastern Brazil.

== See also ==
- List of rivers of Espírito Santo
