= São Sebastião River (Espírito Santo) =

Location
- Country: Brazil

Physical characteristics
- Source
  - location: Espírito Santo state
- Mouth: Santa Maria da Vitória River
  - coordinates: 20°4′S 40°47′W

The São Sebastião River is a river of Espírito Santo state in eastern Brazil.

== See also ==
- List of rivers of Espírito Santo
