= Córrego Grande Biological Reserve =

- Reserva Biológica do Córrego Grande
- IUCN category Ia (strict nature reserve)
- Location within Brazil
- Nearest city: Pedro Canário, Espírito Santo
- Coordinates: 18.265°S 39.801°W
- Area: 1,504 hectares (3,720 acres)
- Designation: Biological reserve
- Created: 12 April 1989

Córrego Grande Biological Reserve (Portuguese: Reserva Biológica do Córrego Grande) is a biological reserve spanning the boundary of Bahia and Espírito Santo, Brazil.

== Location ==
The Córrego Grande Biological Reserve covers parts of the municipalities of Mucuri, Bahia, and Conceição da Barra, Espírito Santo. It is named after the river of the same name that flows through the reserve from west to east. The climate is tropical, warm and mostly humid, with one or two dry months. Average annual temperature is 22 to 24 °C (72 to 75 °F), and average annual rainfall is 1,250 to 1,500 millimetres (49 to 59 in). There are some species unique to the reserve, including three species of hummingbird.

Protected species include northern brown howler (Alouatta guariba guariba), jaguar (Panthera onca), red-browed amazon (Amazona rhodocorytha), white-necked hawk (Buteogallus lacernulatus), black-headed berryeater (Carpornis melanocephala), red-billed curassow (Crax blumenbachii), banded cotinga (Cotinga maculata), great-billed hermit (Phaethornis malaris) and ochre-marked parakeet (Pyrrhura cruentata).

== History ==
The Córrego Grande Biological Reserve of 1,503.75 hectares (3,715.8 acres) was established by decree of 12 April 1989. It is managed by the Chico Mendes Institute for Biodiversity Conservation. It became part of the Central Atlantic Forest Ecological Corridor, created in 2002. The Biological Reserve is a "strict nature reserve" under IUCN protected area category Ia. It tries to preserve the biota and other natural attributes without human interference. It was established to protect part of the last remaining rainforest zone of the Atlantic Forest.

In January 2014 the Federal Public Ministry in Espírito Santo gained a court ruling that ICMBio had 180 days to delimit buffer zones around the Córrego Grande Biological Reserve as well as the nearby 2,830 hectares (7,000 acres) Rio Preto National Forest and the 1,850 hectares (4,600 acres) Córrego do Veado Biological Reserve. A buffer zone is an area around a conservation unit where human activity is subject to various rules and restrictions.

== Sources ==
- "ES: ICMBio terá que delimitar zona de amortecimento de três unidades de conservação", Eco Debate (in Portuguese), 29 January 2014
- Lamas, Ivana Reis; Crepaldi, Maria Otávia; Mesquita, Carlos Alberto Bernardo (2015), Uma Rede no Corredor (PDF) (in Portuguese), Conservação Internacional (CI-Brasil), ISBN 978-85-98830-28-5
- Rebio do Córrego Grande (in Portuguese), Instituto Chico Mendes de Conservação da Biodiversidade
- "Reserva Biológica do Córrego Grande", Viarural (in Portuguese), archived from the original on 2016-04-23
- Unidade de Conservação: Reserva Biológica do Córrego Grande (in Portuguese), MMA: Ministério do Meio Ambiente
