= Braço Norte Esquerdo River =

Location
- Country: Brazil

Physical characteristics
- Source
  - location: Espírito Santo state
- Mouth: Itapemirim River
  - coordinates: 20°32′S 41°31′W

The Braço Norte Esquerdo River is a river of Espírito Santo state in eastern Brazil.

== See also ==
- List of rivers of Espírito Santo
