= Taquaraçu River (Espírito Santo) =

Location
- Country: Brazil

Physical characteristics
- Source
  - location: Espírito Santo state
- Mouth: Castelo River
  - coordinates: 20°22′S 41°15′W

The Taquaraçu River is a river of Espírito Santo state in eastern Brazil. It is a tributary of the Castelo River.

== See also ==
- List of rivers of Espírito Santo
