= Freire Muniz River =

Location
- Country: Brazil

Physical characteristics
- Source
  - location: Espírito Santo state
- Mouth: Braço Sul do Rio São Mateus
  - coordinates: 18°44′S 40°38′W

The Freire Muniz River is a river of Espírito Santo state in eastern Brazil.

== See also ==
- List of rivers of Espírito Santo
