= Pongal =

Pongal may refer to:

- Pongal (dish), a South Indian meal prepared from rice, milk and other ingredients prepared during the festival
- Pongal (festival) or Thai Pongal, an annual Tamil people festival, which is celebrated for planting crops during the month of Thai
- Pongal River, a river in Espírito Santo, Brazil

== See also ==
- Thai Pongal (film), a 1980 Indian Tamil-language film
