= Ribeirão River =

Location
- Country: Brazil

Physical characteristics
- Source
  - location: Espírito Santo state
- Mouth: Riacho River
  - coordinates: 19°40′S 40°2′W

The Ribeirão River is a river of Espírito Santo state in eastern Brazil.

== See also ==
- List of rivers of Espírito Santo
