= Muribeca River =

Location
- Country: Brazil

Physical characteristics
- Source
  - location: Espírito Santo state
- Mouth: Itabapoana River
  - coordinates: 21°15′53″S 40°59′59″W

The Muribeca River is a river of Espírito Santo state in eastern Brazil.

== See also ==
- List of rivers of Espírito Santo
