= Cachoeira da Fumaça State Park =

State park in Espírito Santo, Brazil

- Parque Estadual da Cachoeira da Fumaça
- IUCN category II (national park)
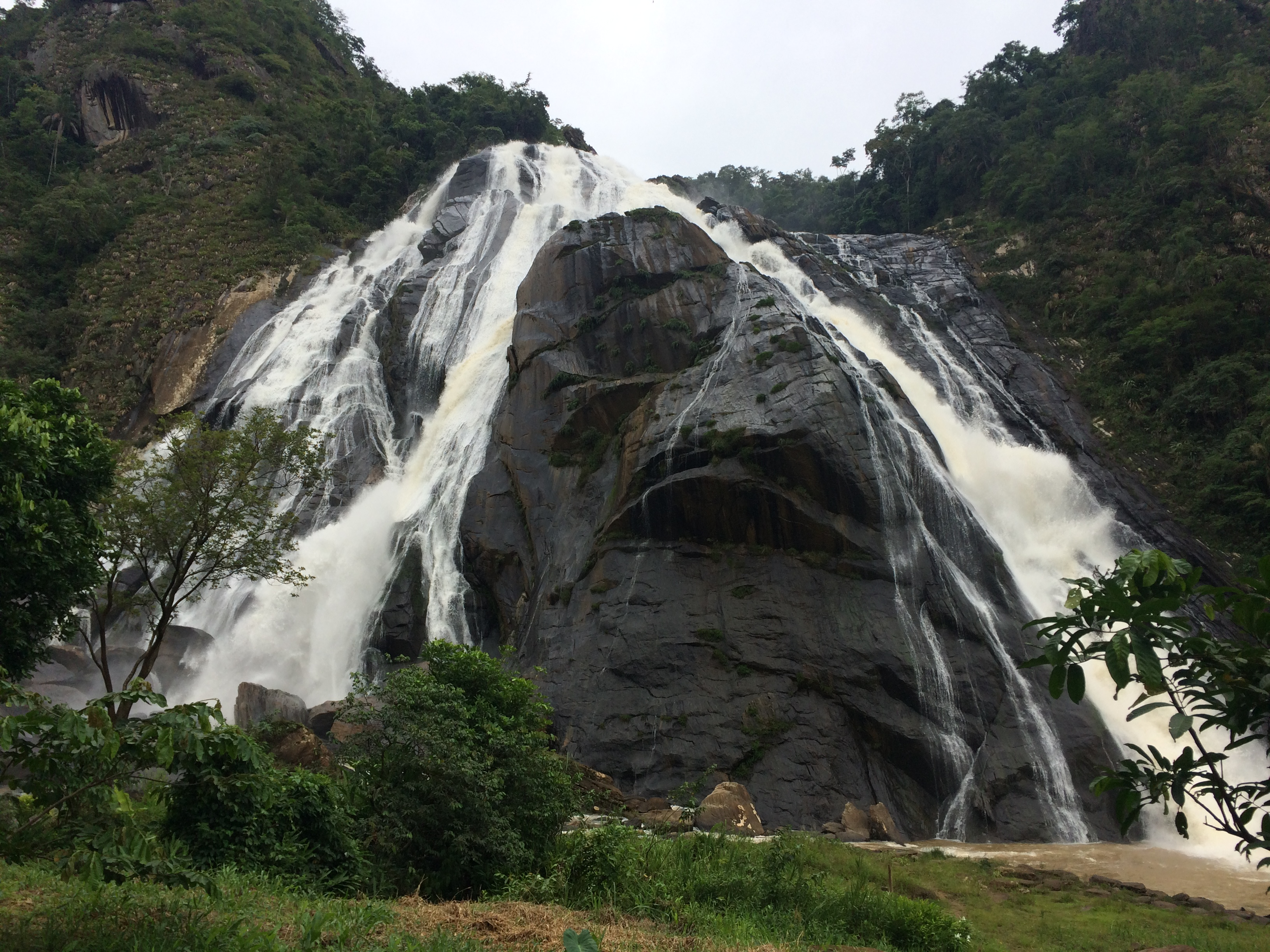
- Cachoeira da Fumaça

- Location within Brazil
- Nearest city: Alegre, Espírito Santo
- Coordinates: 20.628385°S 41.605322°W
- Area: 162.5 hectares (402 acres)
- Designation: State park
- Created: 24 August 1984

The Cachoeira da Fumaça State Park (Portuguese: Parque Estadual da Cachoeira da Fumaça) is a state park in the state of Espírito Santo, Brazil, known for a dramatic waterfall. (Note: Not to be confused with the 340-metre (1,120 ft) high Cachoeira da Fumaça in Bahia.) Visitors may swim in the pools.

== Location ==
Cachoeira da Fumaça State Park is in the municipality of Alegre, Espírito Santo, about 33 kilometres (21 mi) from the municipal seat. It is accessible by a well-maintained road paved in cobblestone. The park has an area of 162.5 hectares (402 acres). In the hottest season of the year the park usually has around 3,000 visitors per month.

The original vegetation was semi-deciduous forest, but over the years there were plantations of native oil and fruit trees. 27 hectares (67 acres) had been turned into pasture. Regeneration of the forest in the pasture areas has been underway since 2008. With replanting of native species some of the original resident and migratory birds have returned.

The 140-metre (460 ft) Cachoeira da Fumaça waterfall on the Braço Norte Direito River, a tributary of the Itapemirim River, attracts thousands of visitors annually due to its great scenic beauty. Visitors may swim in the streams and pools. There are four tracks with different levels of difficulty. The falls are reached by an 800-metre (2,600 ft) walk through the Atlantic Forest. The "smoke" of water droplets has a cooling effect.

== History ==
The Cachoeira da Fumaça State Park was created by state decree 2.791-ES of 24 August 1984, and expanded by decree 4.568-ES of 21 September 1990 when the state, responding to a request from the residents of the municipalities of Alegre, Guaçuí and Castelo, expropriated 27 hectares (67 acres) of pasture in the interior. It became part of the Central Atlantic Forest Ecological Corridor, created in 2002.

== Sources ==
- Cachoeira da Fumaça (in Portuguese), Alegre Municipality, 25 January 2013
- Lamas, Ivana Reis; Crepaldi, Maria Otávia; Mesquita, Carlos Alberto Bernardo (2015), Uma Rede no Corredor (PDF) (in Portuguese), Conservação Internacional (CI-Brasil), ISBN 978-85-98830-28-5
- "Parque da Cachoeira da Fumaça tem trilhas guiadas para turistas no ES", G1 Globo, 28 January 2014
- "Parque Estadual da Cachoeira da Fumaça", SouES (in Portuguese), Visão Mídia e Entretenimento LTDA
