= Veado River (Santo Antônio River tributary) =

- Location within Brazil
- Native name: Rio Veado (Portuguese)

Location
- Country: Brazil

Physical characteristics
- Source
  - location: Espírito Santo state
- Mouth: Santo Antônio River
  - coordinates: 18°21′S 40°6′W

The Veado River is a river of Espírito Santo state in eastern Brazil. It is a tributary of the Santo Antônio River which in turn joins the Itaúnas River.

The river flows through the 2,357 hectares (5,820 acres) Córrego do Veado Biological Reserve from west to east in the municipality of Pinheiros, Espírito Santo.

== See also ==
- List of rivers of Espírito Santo
