= Muqui do Norte River =

Location
- Country: Brazil

Physical characteristics
- Source
  - location: Espírito Santo state
- Mouth: Itapemirim River
  - coordinates: 20°59′S 40°54′W

The Muqui do Norte River is a river of Espírito Santo state in eastern Brazil.

== See also ==
- List of rivers of Espírito Santo
