= Braço Norte Direito River =

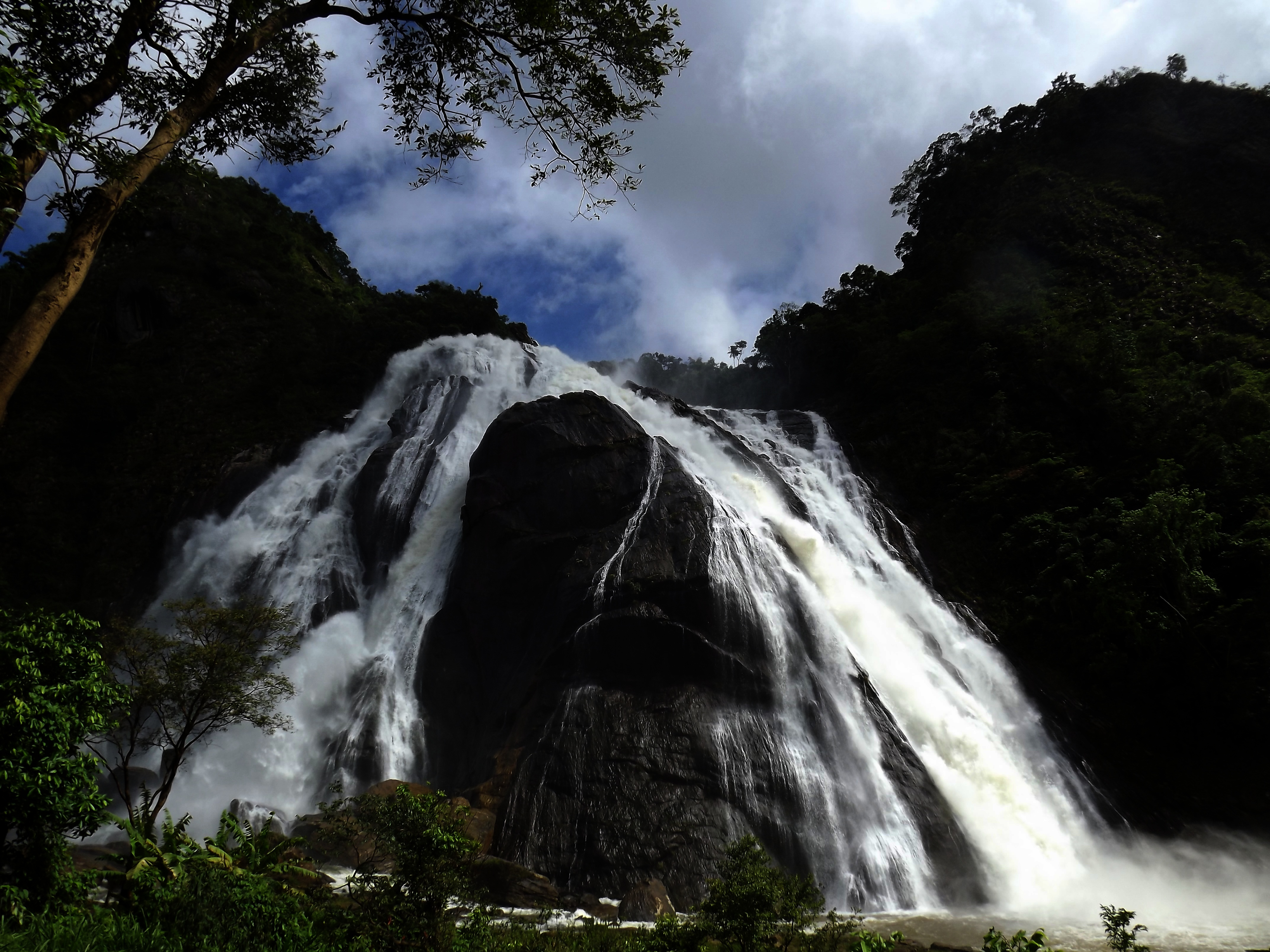

- Location within Brazil
- Native name: Rio Braço Norte Direito (Portuguese)

Location
- Country: Brazil

Physical characteristics
- Source
  - location: Espírito Santo state
- Mouth
  - coordinates: 20.701250°S 41.509037°W

Basin features
- River system: Itapemirim River

The Braço Norte Direito River, or Santa Clara River, is a river of Espírito Santo state in eastern Brazil. It is a tributary of the Itapemirim River.

The Itapemirim River is formed by the Castelo River and the Braço Norte Direito and Braço Norte Esquerdo rivers, whose sources are in the Caparaó National Park. The 140 metres (460 ft) Cachoeira da Fumaça waterfall on the Braço Norte Direito River attracts thousands of visitors annually.

== See also ==
- List of rivers of Espírito Santo

== Sources ==
- Cachoeira da Fumaça (in Portuguese), Alegre Municipality, 25 January 2013
- Descrição: A Bacia do Rio Itapemirim (in Portuguese), Rede de Sementes Florestais do Entorno do Caparaó e Bacia do Rio Itapemirim
