= Fundão River =

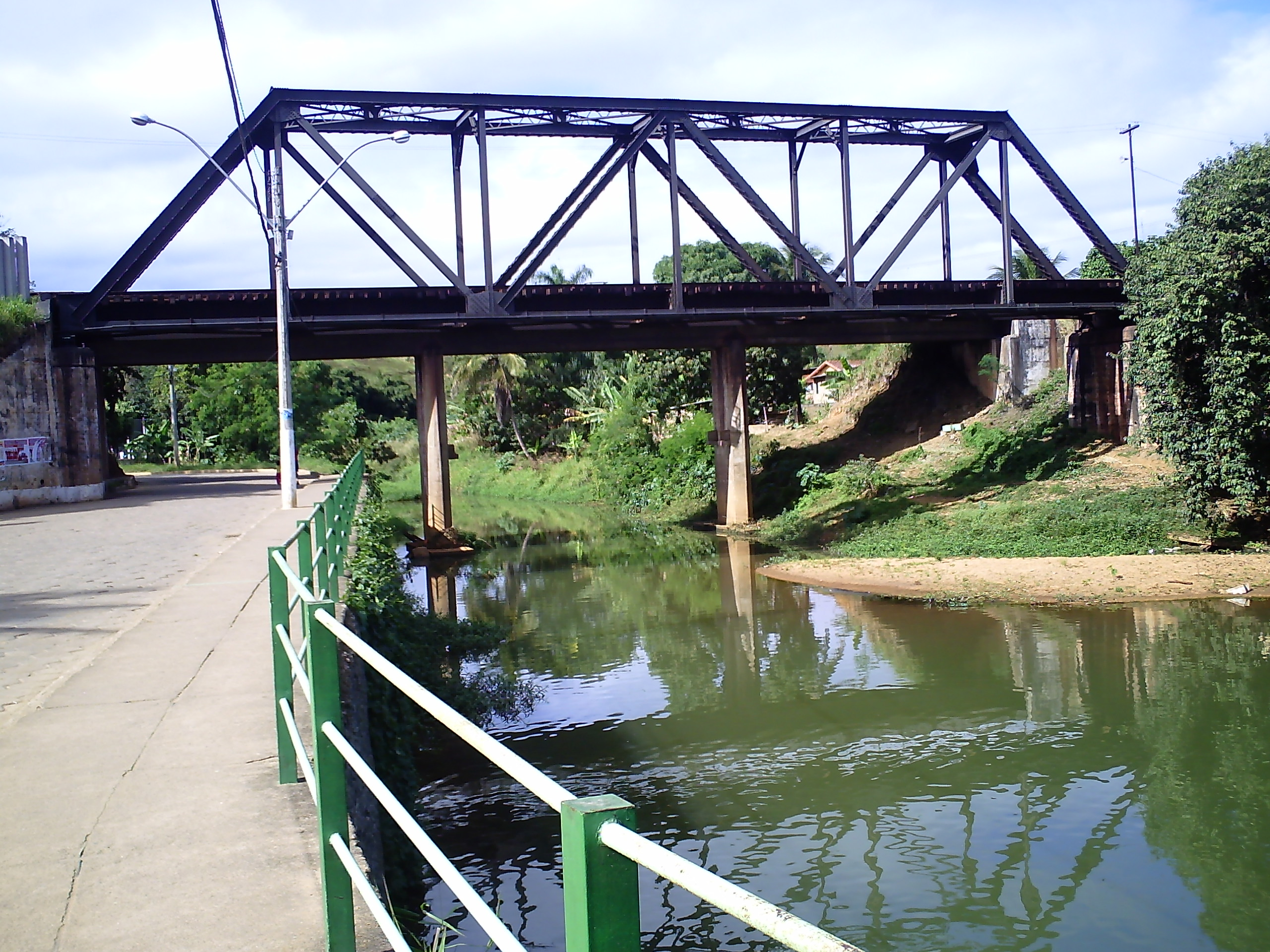

Location
- Country: Brazil

Physical characteristics
- Source
  - location: Espírito Santo state
- Mouth: Reis Magos River
  - coordinates: 20°2′S 40°20′W

The Fundão River is a river of Espírito Santo state in eastern Brazil.

== See also ==
- List of rivers of Espírito Santo
