= Jundiaí River =

Jundiaí River may refer to:

- Jundiaí River (Espírito Santo)
- Jundiaí River (upper Tietê River tributary)
- Jundiaí River (Rio Grande do Norte)
- Jundiaí River (São Paulo)

== See also ==
- Jundiaí
