= Timbuí River =

Location
- Country: Brazil

Physical characteristics
- Source
  - location: Espírito Santo state
- Mouth: Reis Magos River
  - coordinates: 20°2′S 40°20′W

The Timbuí River is a river of Espírito Santo state in eastern Brazil.

Part of the river basin is contained in the 3,562 hectares (8,800 acres) Augusto Ruschi Biological Reserve, a fully protected area.

== See also ==
- List of rivers of Espírito Santo
