= Angelim River =

Location
- Country: Brazil

Physical characteristics
- Source
  - location: Espírito Santo state
- Mouth: Itaúnas River
  - coordinates: 18°25′S 39°43′W

The Angelim River is a river of Espírito Santo state in eastern Brazil.

== See also ==
- List of rivers of Espírito Santo
