= Da Fumaça River =

Location
- Country: Brazil

Physical characteristics
- Source
  - location: Espírito Santo state
- Mouth: Santa Maria da Vitória River
  - coordinates: 20°8′S 40°26′W

The Da Fumaça River is a river of Espírito Santo state in eastern Brazil.

== See also ==
- List of rivers of Espírito Santo
