= Quinze de Novembro River =

Quinze de Novembro River may refer to:

== Brazil ==
- Quinze de Novembro River (Espírito Santo)
- Quinze de Novembro River (Santa Catarina)

== See also ==
- Quinze de Novembro, Rio Grande do Sul, Brazil
