= Nova Lombardia River =

Nova Lombárdia River

Location
- Country: Brazil

Physical characteristics
- Source
  - location: Espírito Santo state
- Mouth: Piraquê Açu River
  - coordinates: 19°45′S 40°23′W

The Nova Lombárdia River is a river of Espírito Santo state in eastern Brazil.

== See also ==
- List of rivers of Espírito Santo
