= Jundiaí River (Espírito Santo) =

Location
- Country: Brazil

Physical characteristics
- Source
  - location: Espírito Santo state
- Mouth: Preto River
  - coordinates: 18°24′S 39°53′W

The Jundiaí River is a river of Espírito Santo state in eastern Brazil.

== See also ==
- List of rivers of Espírito Santo
