= Muqui do Sul River =

Coordinates: 21°12′36″S 41°19′57″W

Location
- Country: Brazil

Physical characteristics
- Source
  - location: Espírito Santo state

The Muqui do Sul River is a river of Espírito Santo state in eastern Brazil.

== See also ==
- List of rivers of Espírito Santo
