= Preto River (Cricaré River tributary) =

Location
- Country: Brazil

Physical characteristics
- Source
  - location: Espírito Santo state
- Mouth: Braço Sul do Rio São Mateus (Cricaré River)
  - coordinates: 18°40′S 40°55′W

The Preto River is a river of Espírito Santo state in eastern Brazil. It is a tributary of the São Mateus River (Cricaré River).

== See also ==
- List of rivers of Espírito Santo
