= São José River (Espírito Santo) =

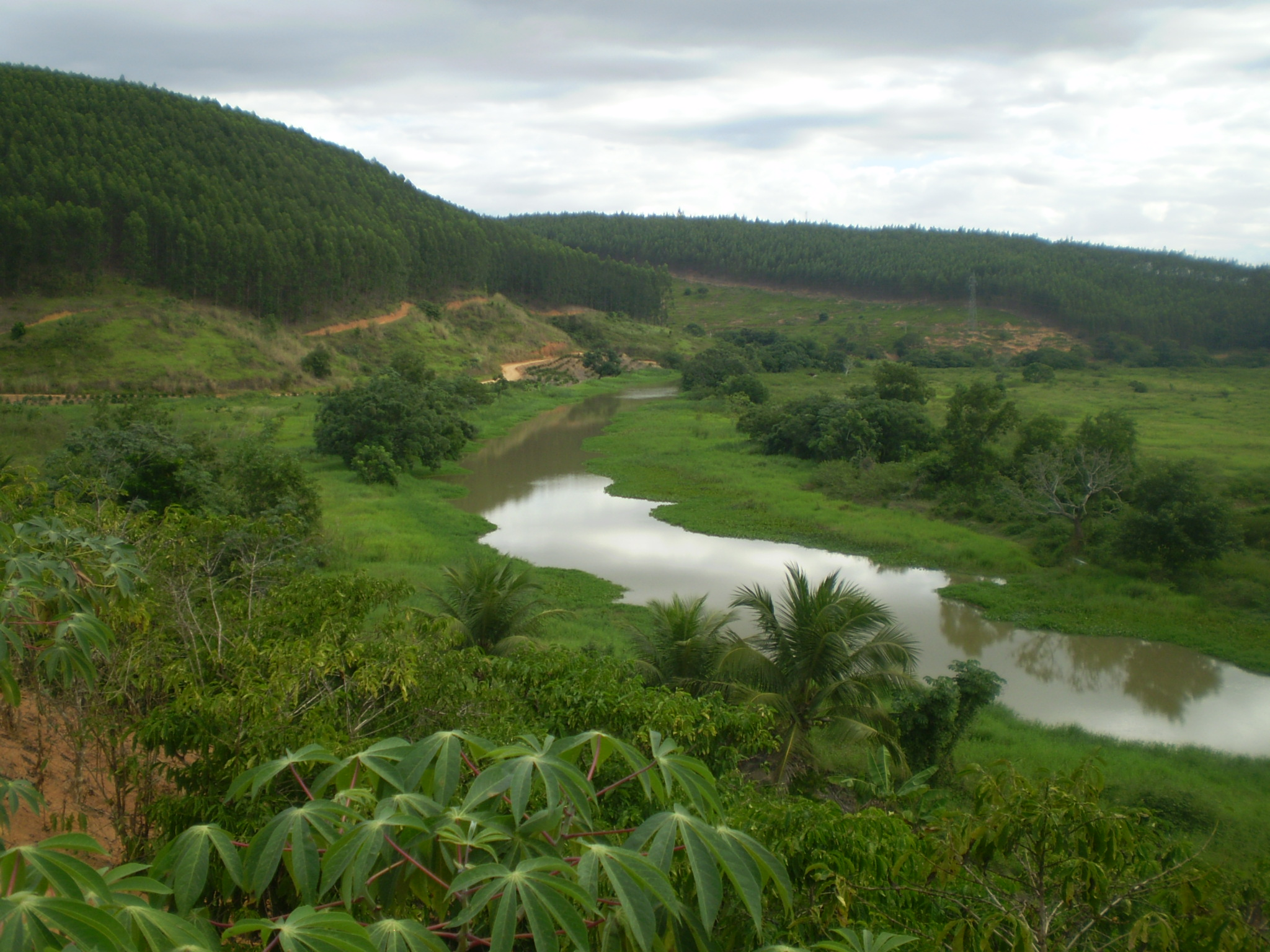

Location
- Country: Brazil

Physical characteristics
- Source
  - location: Espírito Santo state
- Mouth: Lagoa Juparanã
  - coordinates: 19°10′S 40°12′W

The São José River is a river of Espírito Santo state in eastern Brazil.

== See also ==
- List of rivers of Espírito Santo
