= Guarapari River =

Coordinates: 20°40′S 40°30′W

Location
- Country: Brazil

Physical characteristics
- Source
  - location: Espírito Santo state

The Guarapari River is a river in Espírito Santo state in eastern Brazil.

== See also ==
- List of rivers of Espírito Santo
