= Novo River (Espírito Santo) =

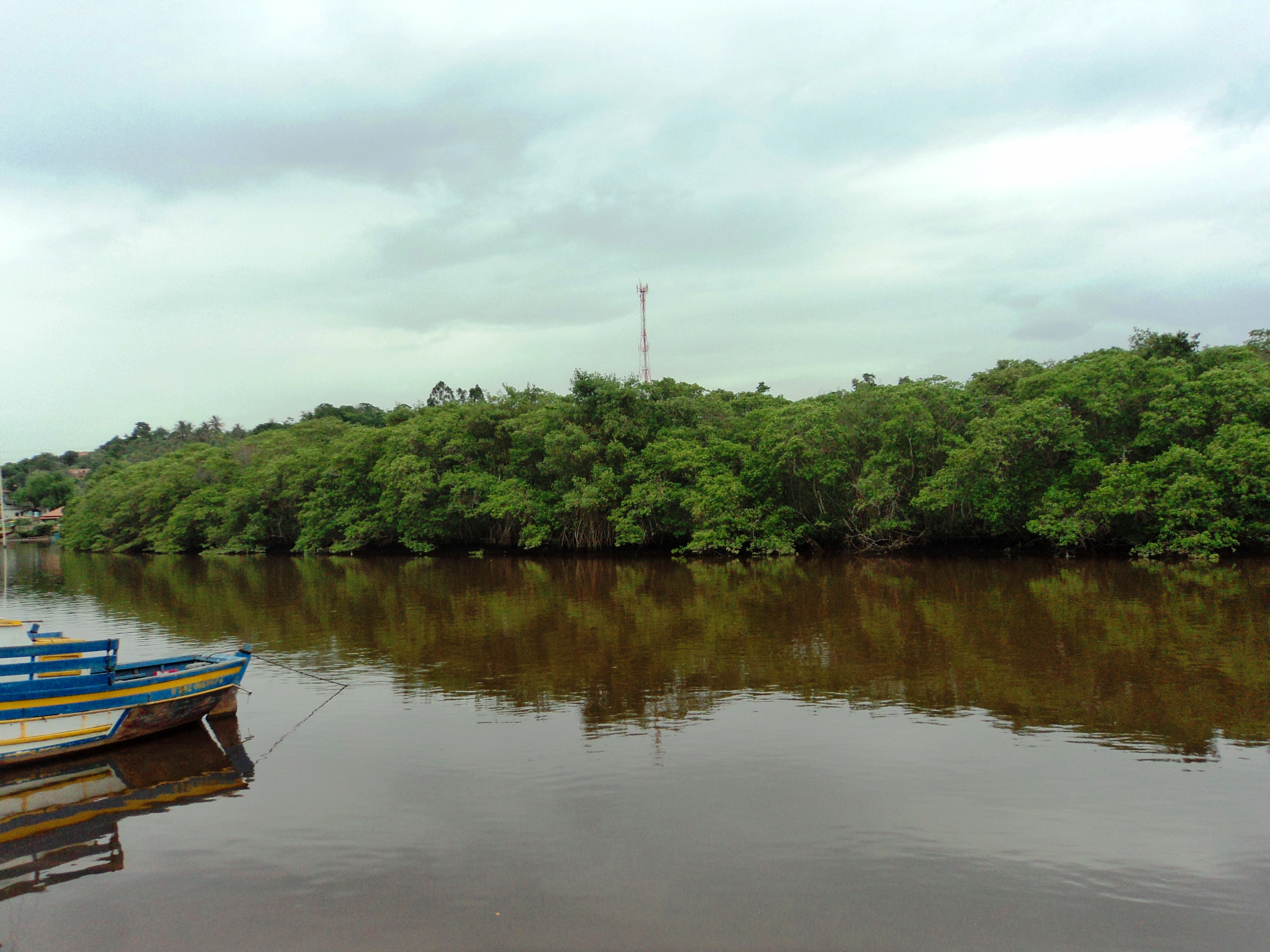

Location
- Country: Brazil

Physical characteristics
- Source
  - location: Espírito Santo state
- Mouth: Atlantic Ocean
  - coordinates: 20°51′S 40°45′W

The Novo River is a river of Espírito Santo state in eastern Brazil.

== See also ==
- List of rivers of Espírito Santo
