= Calçado River (Jacarandá River tributary) =

River in Espírito Santo, Brazil

Location
- Country: Brazil

Physical characteristics
- Source
  - location: Espírito Santo state
- Mouth: Jacarandá River
  - coordinates: 20°29′S 40°32′W

The Calçado River is a river of Espírito Santo state in eastern Brazil. It is a tributary of the Jacarandá River.

== See also ==
- List of rivers of Espírito Santo
