= Santo Antônio River (Itaúnas River tributary) =

Location
- Country: Brazil

Physical characteristics
- Source
  - location: Espírito Santo state
- Mouth: Braço Sul do Rio Itaúnas
  - coordinates: 18°18′S 40°3′W

The Santo Antônio River is a river of Espírito Santo state in eastern Brazil. It is a tributary of the Braço Sul do Rio Itaúnas.

== See also ==
- List of rivers of Espírito Santo
