= Francês River =

Coordinates: 19°34′59″S 40°04′48″W

Location
- Country: Brazil

Physical characteristics
- Source
  - location: Espírito Santo state

The Francês River is a river of Espírito Santo state in eastern Brazil.

== See also ==
- List of rivers of Espírito Santo
