= List of rivers of Espírito Santo =

List of rivers in Espírito Santo (Brazilian State).

The list is arranged by drainage basin from north to south, with respective tributaries indented under each larger stream's name and ordered from downstream to upstream. All rivers in Espírito Santo drain to the Atlantic Ocean.

== By drainage basin ==
- Itaúnas River
  - Angelim River
  - Preto River (Itauninhas River)
    - Jundiaí River
  - Braço Norte do Rio Itaúnas
    - Itauninha River
  - Braço Sul do Rio Itaúnas
    - Santo Antônio River
      - Veado River
- São Mateus River
  - Santana River
  - Mariricu River
    - Preto River
  - Braço Norte do Rio São Mateus (Cotaxé River)
    - Quinze de Novembro River
    - Dois de Setembro River
  - Braço Sul do Rio São Mateus (Cricaré River)
    - Freire Muniz River
    - Preto River
- Barra Seca River
  - Pau Atravessado River
  - Cupido River
- Doce River
  - São José River
    - Moacir Ávidos River
  - Pau Gigante River
  - Baunilhas River
  - Pancas River
    - Panquinhas River
  - Santa Maria do Rio Doce River
    - Santa Júlia River
  - Santa Joana River
  - São João Pequeno River
  - São João Grande River
  - Mutum River
  - Guandu River
    - São Domingos Grande River
- Riacho River
  - Gemuuma River
    - Da Prata River
  - Brejo Grande River
  - Ribeirão River (Araraduara River)
  - Lake Aguiar
    - Quartel River
    - Do Norte River
    - Francês River
- Guaxindibe River
- Piraquê Açu River
  - Piraquê-Mirim River
  - Nova Lombárdia River
- Reis Magos River
  - Fundão River
  - Timbuí River
- Jacaraípe River
- Santa Maria da Vitória River
  - São Miguel River
  - Da Fumaça River
  - São Sebastião River
- Jucu River
  - Jacarandá River
    - Calçado River
  - Santo Agostinho River
  - Jucu Braço Norte River
  - Jucu Braço Sul River
    - Fundo River
- Guarapari River
- Benevente River
  - Pongal River
- Novo River
  - Itapoama River
    - Iconha River
- Itapemirim River
  - Muqui do Norte River
  - Castelo River
    - Caxixa River
    - Taquaraçu River
  - Braço Norte Esquerdo River
  - Alegre River
  - Braço do Norte Direito River
- Itabapoana River
  - Muribaca River
  - Preto River
  - Muqui do Sul River
  - Calçado River
  - Veado River
  - Preto River

== Alphabetically ==
- Alegre River
- Angelim River
- Barra Seca River
- Baunilhas River
- Benevente River
- Braço do Norte Direito River
- Braço Norte Esquerdo River
- Brejo Grande River
- Calçado River
- Calçado River
- Castelo River
- Caxixa River
- Cupido River
- Doce River
- Dois de Setembro River
- Da Fumaça River
- Francês River
- Freire Muniz River
- Fundão River
- Fundo River
- Gemuuma River
- Guandu River
- Guarapari River
- Guaxindibe River
- Iconha River
- Itabapoana River
- Itapemirim River
- Itapoama River
- Itaúnas River
- Braço Norte do Rio Itaúnas
- Braço Sul do Rio Itaúnas
- Itauninha River
- Jacaraípe River
- Jacarandá River
- Jucu Braço Norte River
- Jucu Braço Sul River
- Jucu River
- Jundiaí River
- Mariricu River
- Moacir Ávidos River
- Muqui do Norte River
- Muqui do Sul River
- Muribaca River
- Mutum River
- Do Norte River
- Nova Lombárdia River
- Novo River
- Pancas River
- Panquinhas River
- Pau Atravessado River
- Pau Gigante River
- Piraquê Açu River
- Piraquê-Mirim River
- Pongal River
- Da Prata River
- Preto River
- Preto River
- Preto River
- Preto River (Itauninhas River)
- Preto River
- Quartel River
- Quinze de Novembro River
- Reis Magos River
- Riacho River
- Ribeirão River (Araraduara River)
- Santa Joana River
- Santa Júlia River
- Santa Maria da Vitória River
- Santa Maria do Rio Doce River
- Santana River
- Santo Agostinho River
- Santo Antônio River
- São Domingos Grande River
- São João Grande River
- São João Pequeno River
- São José River
- São Mateus River
- Braço Norte do Rio São Mateus (Cotaxé River)
- Braço Sul do Rio São Mateus (Cricaré River)
- São Miguel River
- São Sebastião River
- Taquaraçu River
- Timbuí River
- Veado River
- Veado River
