= Alegre, Espírito Santo =

Alegre
- Municipality
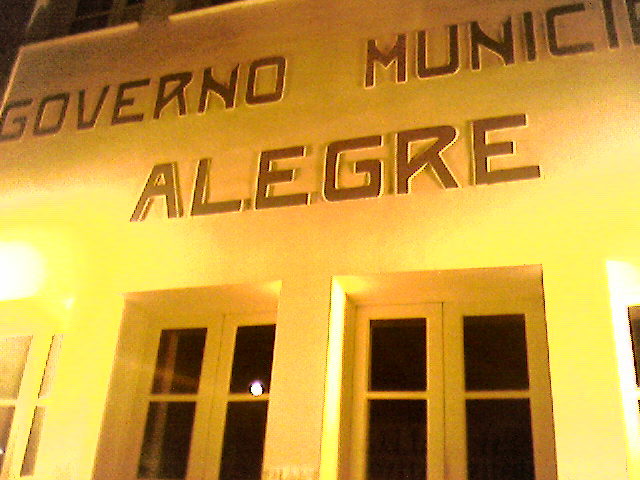
- Municipal Building of Alegre

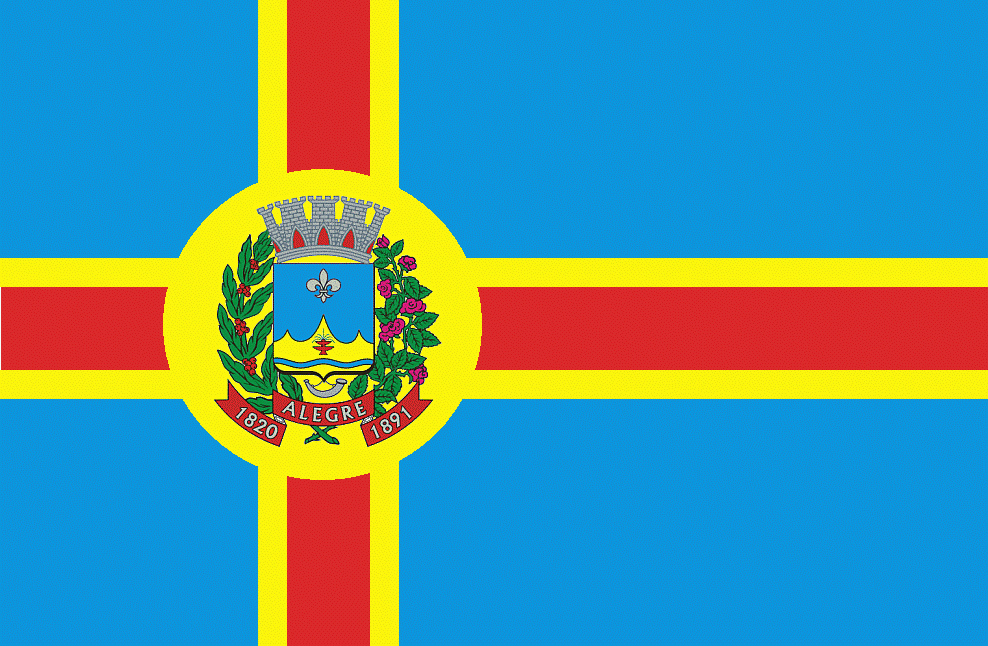
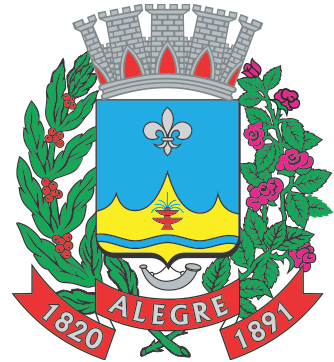
- Flag Coat of arms

- Location in Espírito Santo state

- Location in Brazil
- Coordinates: 20°45′50″S 41°31′58″W
- Country: Brazil
- Region: Southeast
- State: Espírito Santo
- Established: 11 November 1890

Area
  - Total: 772 km^{2} (298 sq mi)

Population (2020)
  - Total: 29,975
  - Density: 38.8/km^{2} (101/sq mi)
- Time zone: UTC−3 (BRT)

Alegre is a municipality located in the Brazilian state of Espírito Santo. Its population was 29,975 (2020) and its area is 772 km^{2} (298 sq mi).

The municipality contains the Cachoeira da Fumaça State Park, created in 1984.

== Gallery ==
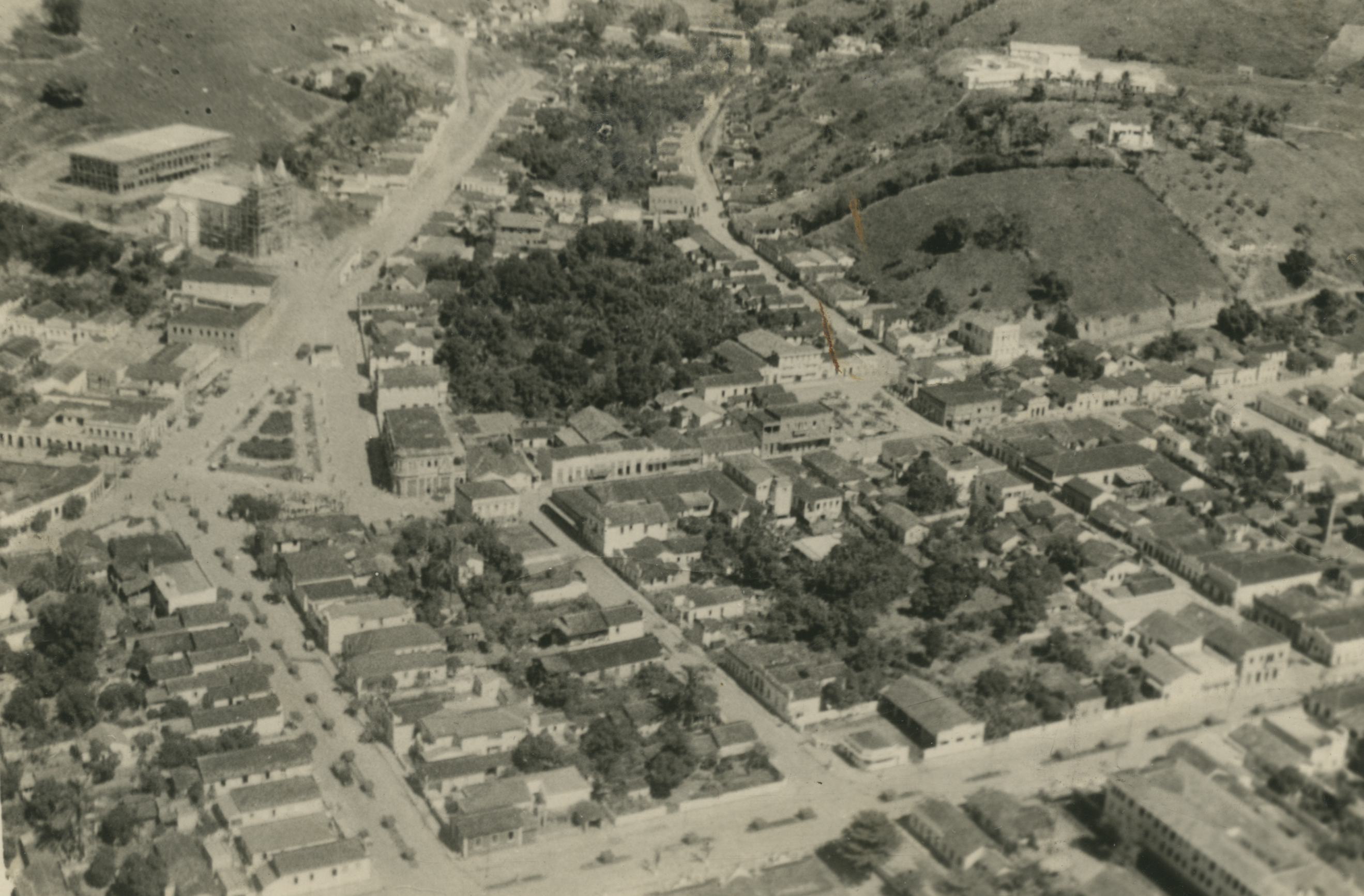
City of Alegre in 1958

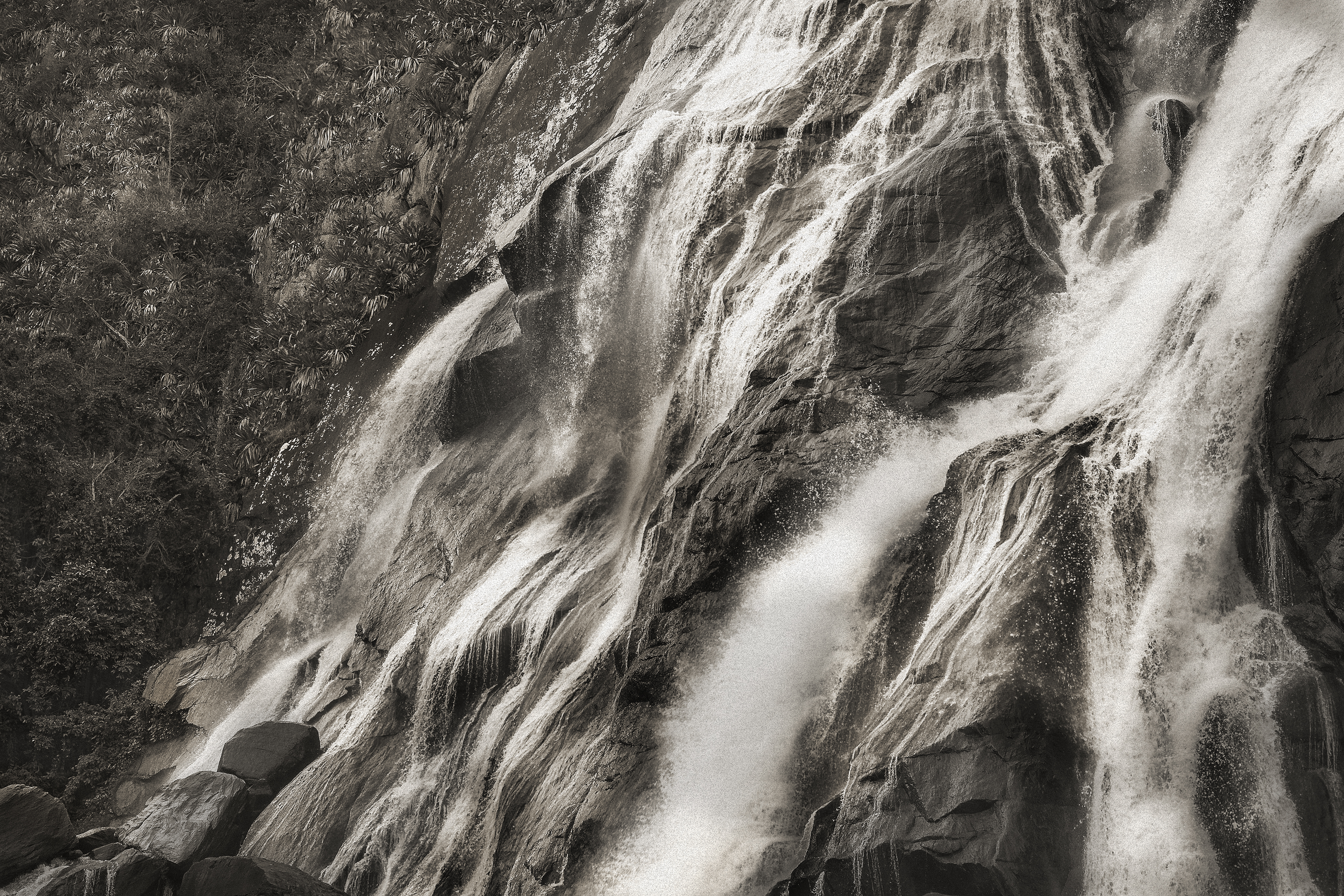
Cachoeira da Fumaça
