= Quartel River =

Coordinates: 19°34′49″S 40°03′27″W

Location
- Country: Brazil

Physical characteristics
- Source
  - location: Espírito Santo state

The Quartel River is a river of Espírito Santo state in eastern Brazil.

== See also ==
- List of rivers of Espírito Santo
