= Jacaraípe River =

Coordinates: 20°07′S 40°12′W

Location
- Country: Brazil

Physical characteristics
- Source
  - location: Espírito Santo state

The Jacaraípe River is a river located in the state of Espírito Santo in eastern Brazil, 900 km southeast of the capital Brasília.

Tropical monsoon climate prevails in the area. The annual average temperature in the area is 25°C. The warmest month is February, when the average temperature is 29°C, and the coldest is August, with 20°C. The average annual rainfall is 17.83 centimeters. The wettest month is December, with an average of 289 mm of rainfall, and the driest is September, with 43 mm of rainfall.

== See also ==
- List of rivers of Espírito Santo
