= Preto River (Itabapoana River tributary) =

Location
- Country: Brazil

Physical characteristics
- Source
  - location: Espírito Santo state
- Mouth: Itabapoana River
  - coordinates: 20°46′S 41°52′W

The Preto River is a river of Espírito Santo state in eastern Brazil. It is a tributary of the Itabapoana River.

== See also ==
- Itabapoana River
- List of rivers of Espírito Santo
