= Benevente River =

Coordinates: 20°48′23″S 40°39′16″W

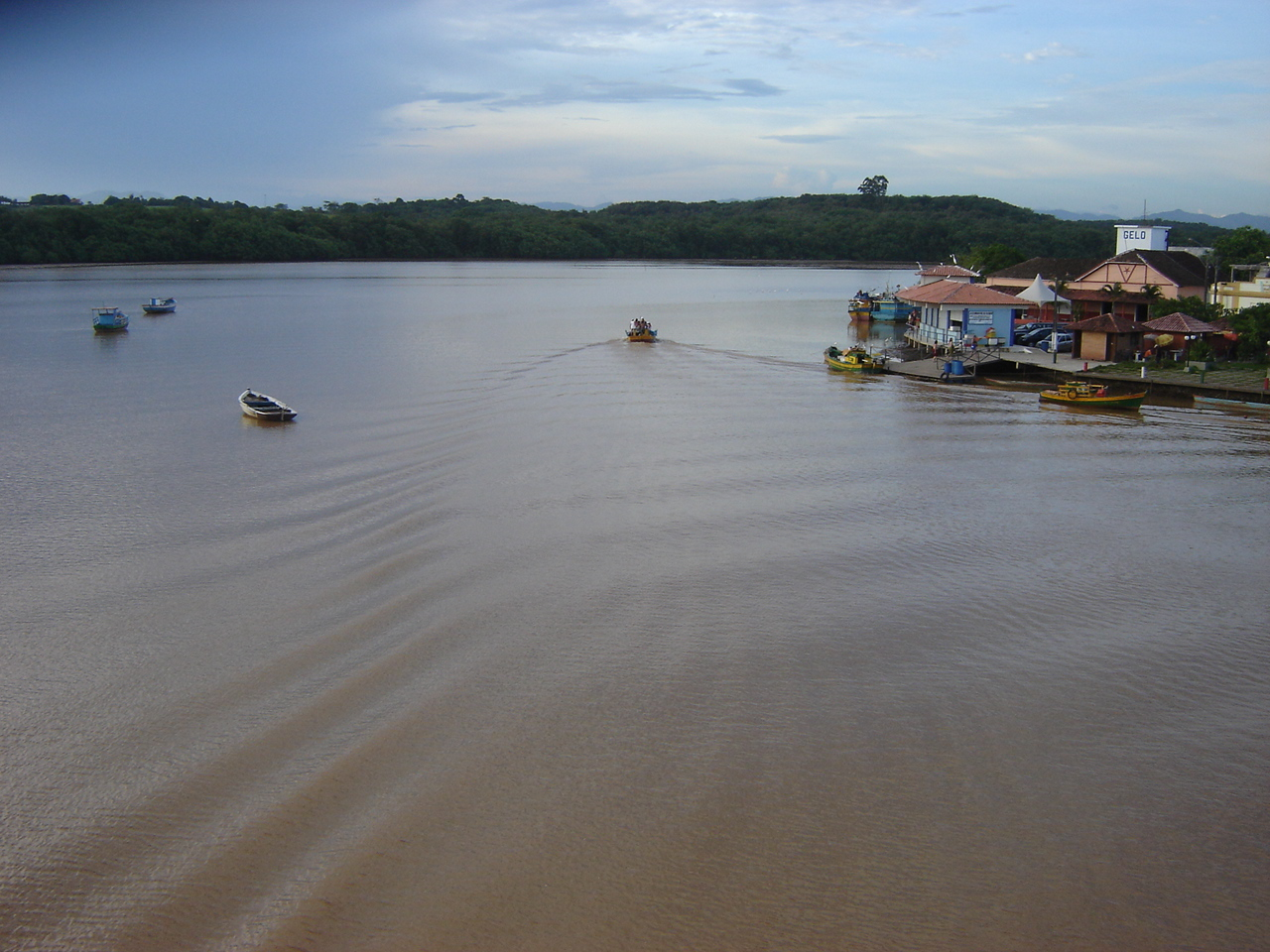

Location
- Country: Brazil

Physical characteristics
- Source
  - location: Espírito Santo state

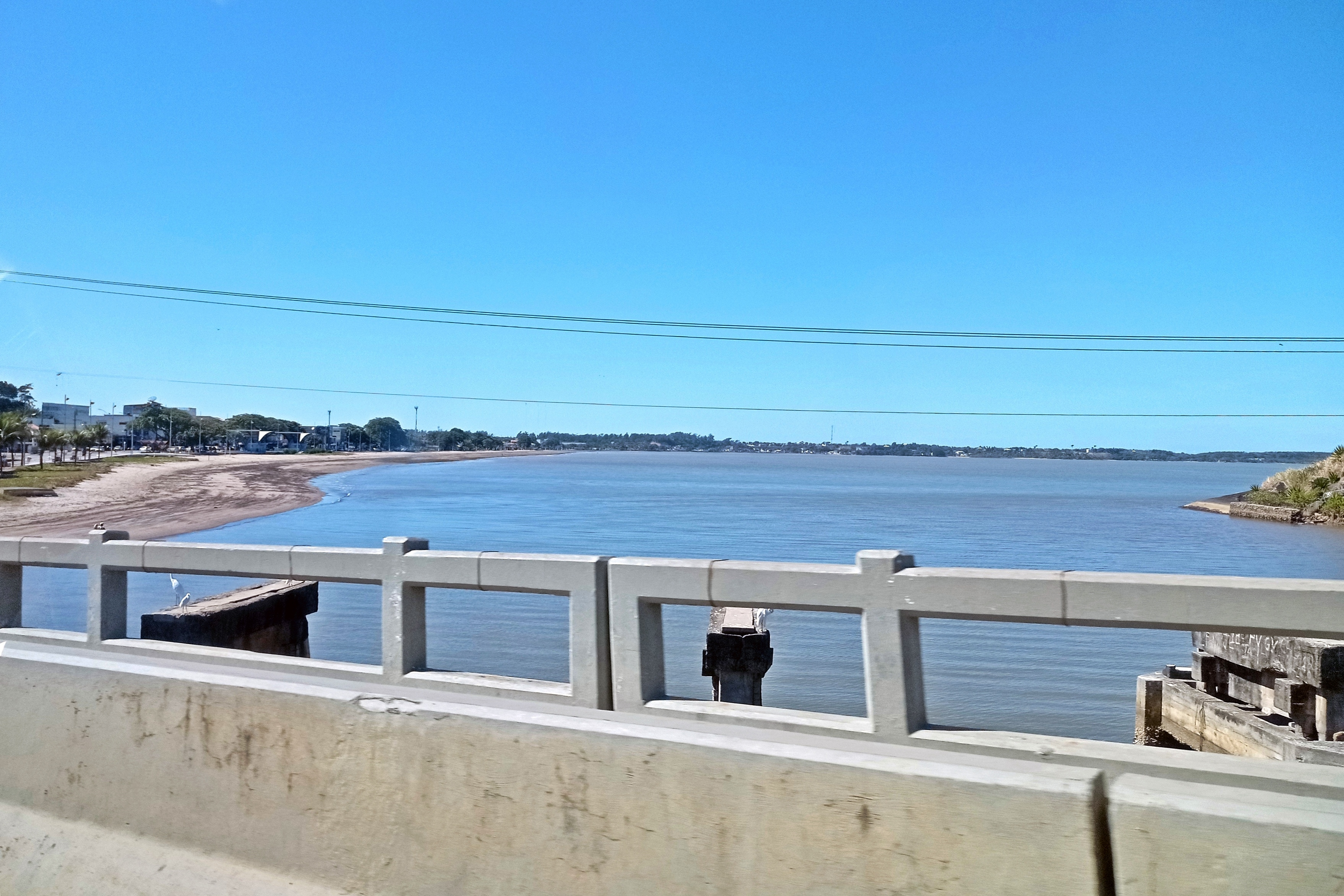
The estuary of the Benevente River seen from the Cônego Barros bridge, in Anchieta, Espírito Santo, Brazil.

The Benevente River is a river of Espírito Santo state in eastern Brazil.

== See also ==
- List of rivers of Espírito Santo
