= Jacarandá River =

River in Espírito Santo, Brazil

Location
- Country: Brazil

Physical characteristics
- Source
  - location: Espírito Santo state
- Mouth: Jucu River
  - coordinates: 20°26′S 40°28′W

The Jacarandá River is a river of Espírito Santo state in eastern Brazil. It is a tributary of the Jucu River.

== See also ==
- List of rivers of Espírito Santo
