= Preto River (Mariricu River tributary) =

Location
- Country: Brazil

Physical characteristics
- Source
  - location: Espírito Santo state
- Mouth: Mariricu River
  - coordinates: 18°48′S 39°46′W

The Preto River is a river of Espírito Santo state in eastern Brazil. It is a tributary of the Mariricu River.

== See also ==
- List of rivers of Espírito Santo
