= Veado River (Itabapoana River tributary) =

Physical characteristics
- Source
  - location: Espírito Santo state
- Mouth: Itabapoana River
  - coordinates: 20°50′S 41°44′W

The Veado River is a river of south-western Espírito Santo state in eastern Brazil. It is a tributary of the Itabapoana River on the border with the state of Rio de Janeiro.

== See also ==
- List of rivers of Espírito Santo
