= Moacir Avidos River =

Coordinates: 19°05′S 40°16′W

Moacir Ávidos River

Location
- Country: Brazil

Physical characteristics
- Source
  - location: Espírito Santo state

The Moacir Ávidos River is a river of Espírito Santo state in eastern Brazil.

== See also ==
- List of rivers of Espírito Santo
