= Santa Joana River =

Coordinates: 19°31′S 40°50′W

Location
- Country: Brazil

Physical characteristics
- Source
  - location: Espírito Santo state

The Santa Joana River is a river of Espírito Santo state in eastern Brazil.

== See also ==
- List of rivers of Espírito Santo
