= Piraqueaçu River =

Piraquê Açu River
- Location within Brazil

Location
- Country: Brazil

Physical characteristics
- Source
  - location: Espírito Santo state
- Mouth
  - location: Atlantic ocean
  - coordinates: 19.951452°S 40.152466°W

The Piraquê Açu River is a river of Espírito Santo state in eastern Brazil.

Part of the river basin is contained in the 3,562 hectares (8,800 acres) Augusto Ruschi Biological Reserve, a fully protected area.

== See also ==
- List of rivers of Espírito Santo
