= Jucu Braço Sul River =

Coordinates: 20°23′18″S 40°33′36″W

Location
- Country: Brazil

Physical characteristics
- Source
  - location: Espírito Santo state

The Jucu Braço Sul River is a river of Espírito Santo state in eastern Brazil.

== See also ==
- List of rivers of Espírito Santo
