= Pinheiros, Espírito Santo =

- Municipality
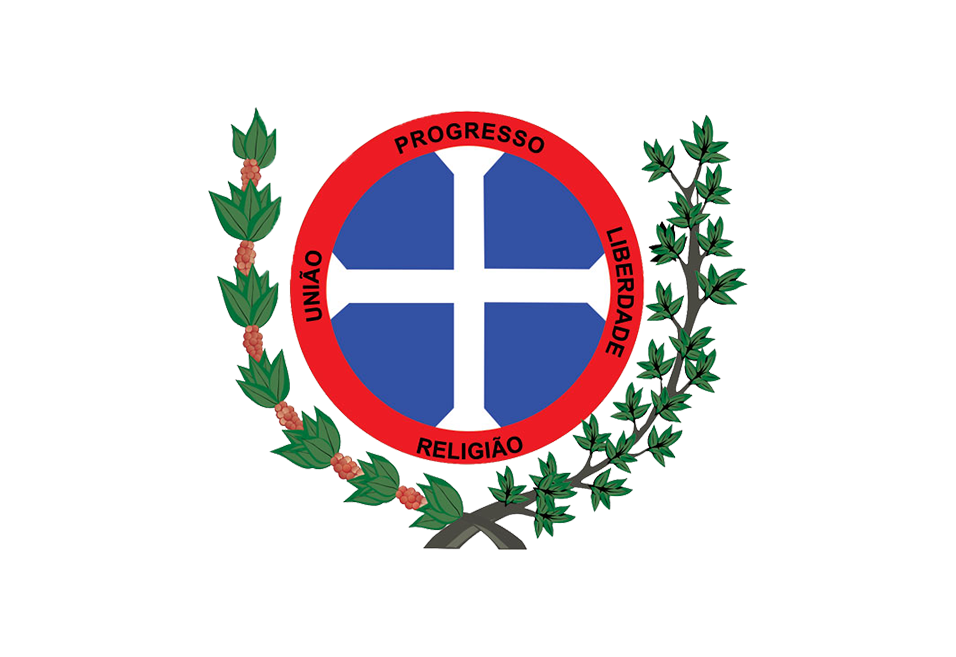
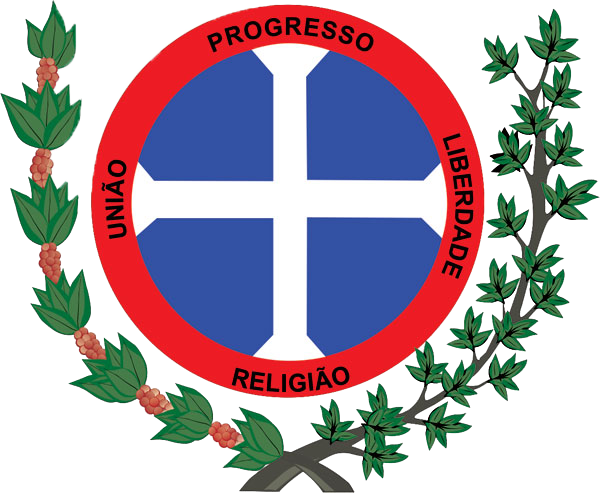
- Flag Coat of arms

- Location within Brazil
- Coordinates: 18.414°S 40.216°W
- Country: Brazil
- State: Espírito Santo

Population (2020)
  - Total: 27,327
- Time zone: UTC−3 (BRT)

Pinheiros is a municipality located in the Brazilian state of Espírito Santo. Its population was 27,327 (2020) and its area is 975 km^{2} (376 sq mi). The capital of this municipality is located at an altitude of 130 meters above sea level.

The municipality contains the 2,357 hectares (5,820 acres) Córrego do Veado Biological Reserve, a strictly protected area named after the Veado River, which flows through the reserve from west to east.
