= Preto River (Itaúnas River tributary) =

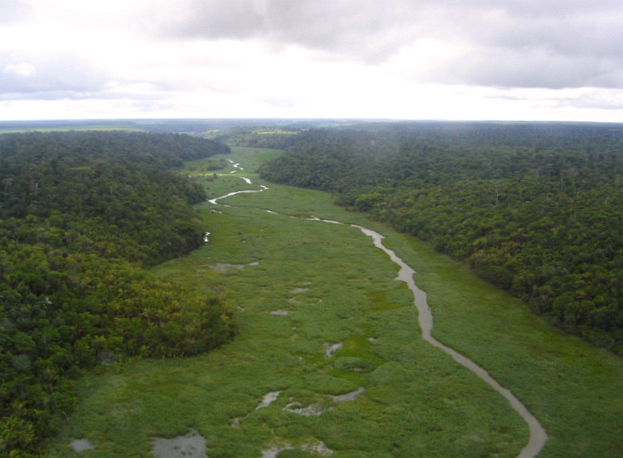
- Aerial view of Preto River, 2008

- Location of the mouth
- Native name: Rio Preto (Portuguese)

Location
- Country: Brazil

Physical characteristics
- Source
  - location: Espírito Santo state
- Mouth: Itaúnas River
  - coordinates: 18.379555°S 39.793975°W

Basin features
- River system: Itaúnas River

The Preto River is a river of Espírito Santo state in eastern Brazil. The river flows through the Rio Preto National Forest. It is a tributary of the Itaúnas River.

== See also ==
- List of rivers of Espírito Santo
