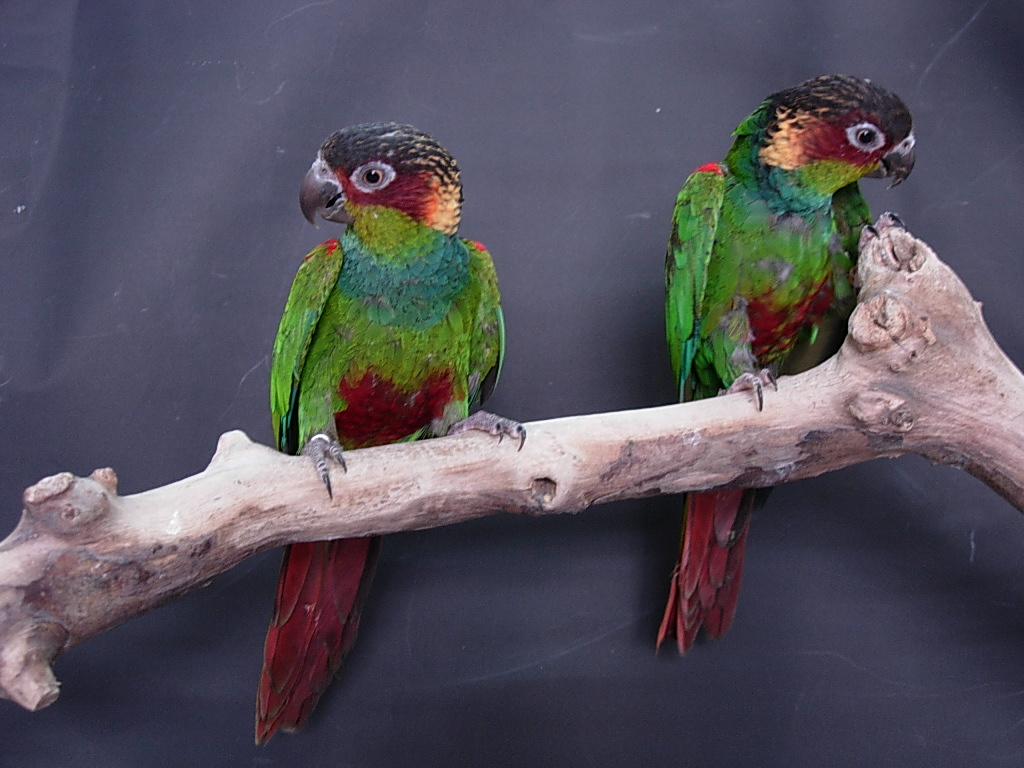

Conservation status
- Vulnerable (IUCN 3.1)
- CITES Appendix I

Scientific classification
- Kingdom: Animalia
- Phylum: Chordata
- Class: Aves
- Order: Psittaciformes
- Family: Psittacidae
- Genus: Pyrrhura
- Species: P. cruentata

Binomial name
- Pyrrhura cruentata (Wied, 1820)

= Ochre-marked parakeet =

Species of bird in Brazil

The ochre-marked parakeet (Pyrrhura cruentata) is a species of parrot native to Brazil. It is also known as blue-throated parakeet in English and tiriba-grande, tiriba, cara-suja and fura-mato-grande in Portuguese. It is listed as Vulnerable (VU) on the IUCN Red List.

== Description ==
This colourful parakeet is a predominantly green bird with conspicuous red patches on its belly, rump, and shoulder and before, below and behind the eye. The crown is dark brown to blackish, becoming mottled on the nape of the neck, and there is a broad, bright blue bib on the chest, extending thinly around the back of the neck to form a faint collar. The outer primaries are blue, and the tail is olive-green above, and brownish red below.

== Habitat ==
It inhabits the canopy of lowland humid forest and edge, occasionally up to 960 meters. It has also been recorded in small clearings and selectively logged forest, and persists (or at least persisted) in agricultural areas where many forest trees are retained (such as shade cocoa plantations). It feeds on seeds and fruit of secondary growth trees such as Trema micrantha and Cecropia. Feeding on agricultural crops has not been observed in the wild. Breeding apparently occurs in the austral spring, when 2–4 eggs are laid in a tree-cavity.

== Distribution ==
Pyrrhura cruentata was formerly common throughout much of south-east Bahia, Espírito Santo, east Minas Gerais and Rio de Janeiro, Brazil. Its current distribution is highly fragmented and now mostly restricted to isolated reserves. The stronghold is the Sooretama Biological Reserve and adjacent Linhares Forest Reserve, Espírito Santo. It remains common in Estação Vera Cruz (formerly the Porto Seguro Reserve), Bahia. Elsewhere it can be relatively common, but numbers in the large Chapada da Diamantina and Monte Pascoal National Parks, Bahia, appear low.

== Population ==
The population is estimated at 4.8 to 41 individuals per square kilometer times 1030 square kilometers for a total between 4944 and 42,230 individuals. It is best placed within the band 2500–9999 individuals.(Marsden et al. [2000]).

== Threats ==
Extensive and continuing forest clearance is responsible for its current fragmented distribution. Its apparent tolerance of shade cacao plantations provides little hope because shading techniques since the 1980s have involved the use of banana and Erythryna trees, rather than standing forest, and unstable prices have resulted in conversion to pasture. Many remaining populations are now affected by site-specific threats such as conflicts between habitat conservation and the rights of local communities in Monte Pascoal National Park. Trapping for the cage-bird trade is a relatively new phenomenon, but the species is rare in national and international markets.

== Conservation efforts ==
The bird is listed on CITES Appendix I and is protected by Brazilian law. It occurs in the Chapada Diamantina and Monte Pascoal National Parks, Barrolândia Experimental Station, Linhares Forest Reserve, Caratinga Biological Station, Rio Doce and probably Desengano State Parks, and the Córrego Grande, Córrego do Veado and Sooretama Biological Reserves.
