= Pancas River =

Coordinates: 19°30′35″S 40°36′33″W

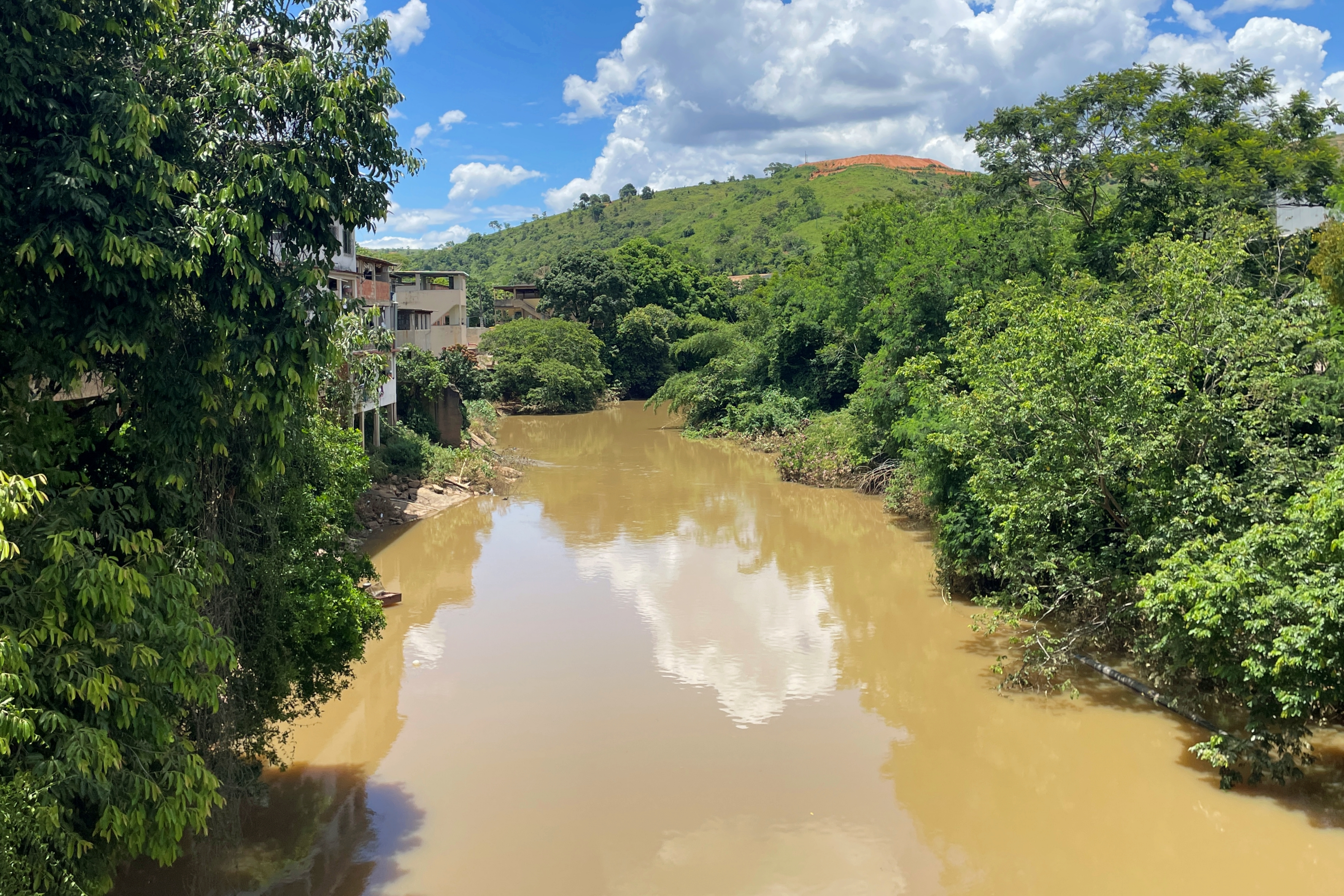

- Location within Brazil

Location
- Country: Brazil

Physical characteristics
- Source
  - location: Espírito Santo state

The Pancas River is a river of Espírito Santo state in eastern Brazil.

== See also ==
- List of rivers of Espírito Santo
