= Castelo River =

Coordinates: 20°44′52″S 41°10′53″W

Location
- Country: Brazil

Physical characteristics
- Source
  - location: Espírito Santo state

The Castelo River is a river of Espírito Santo state in south-eastern Brazil.

== See also ==
- List of rivers of Espírito Santo
