= Barra Seca River =

Location
- Country: Brazil

Physical characteristics
- Source
  - location: Espírito Santo state
- Mouth: Atlantic Ocean
  - coordinates: 19°9′S 39°47′W

The Barra Seca River is a river of Espírito Santo state in eastern Brazil.

== See also ==
- List of rivers of Espírito Santo
