= Braço Sul do Rio Itaúnas =

Coordinates: 18°17′S 40°00′W

Location
- Country: Brazil

Physical characteristics
- Source
  - location: Espírito Santo state

The Braço Sul do Rio Itaúnas is a river of Espírito Santo state in eastern Brazil.

== See also ==
- List of rivers of Espírito Santo
