= Mariricu River =

Coordinates: 18°42′22″S 39°46′35″W

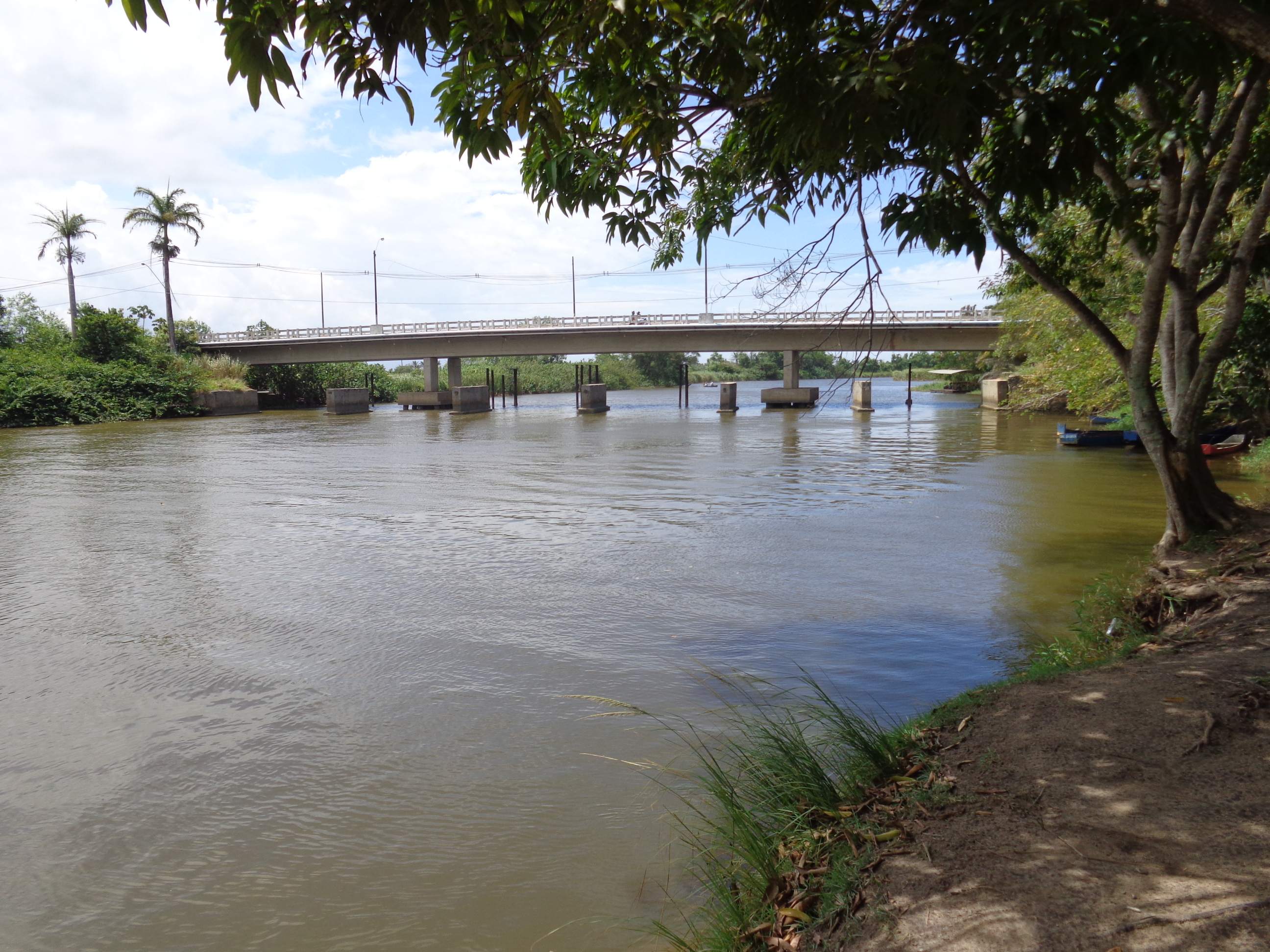

Location
- Country: Brazil

Physical characteristics
- Source
  - location: Espírito Santo state

The Mariricu River is a river of Espírito Santo state in eastern Brazil.

== See also ==
- List of rivers of Espírito Santo
