= Jucu River =

Coordinates: 20°25′23″S 40°19′18″W

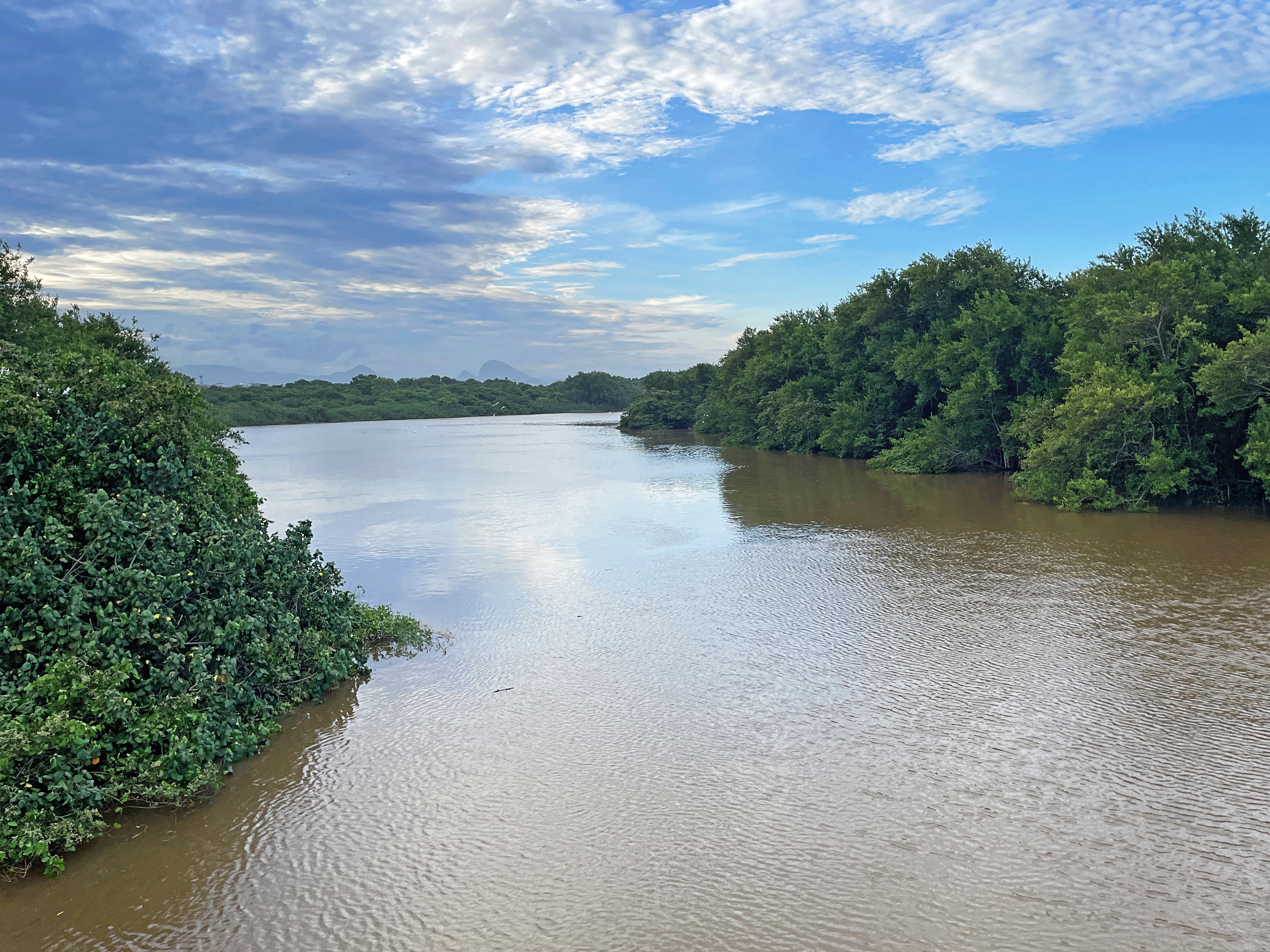

- Jucu River (Brazil)
- Native name: Rio Jucu (Portuguese)

Location
- Country: Brazil

Physical characteristics
- Source
  - location: Espírito Santo state
- Mouth
  - location: Vila Velha. Atlantic ocean

The Jucu River is a river of Espírito Santo state in eastern Brazil.

The estuary of the river is in the Jacarenema Ecological Reserve, a 307 hectares (760 acres) conservation area in the city of Vila Velha. The mangroves of the estuary have suffered from pollution from waste water and garbage washed down from further up the river.

== See also ==
- List of rivers of Espírito Santo
