= Reis Magos River =

Location
- Country: Brazil
- State: Espírito Santo

Physical characteristics
- Source
  - location: Santa Teresa
- Mouth: Atlantic Ocean
  - coordinates: 20°03′S 40°12′W
  - elevation: Sea level
- Basin size: 700 km^{2} (270 sq mi)

The Reis Magos River is a river of Espírito Santo state in eastern Brazil. Its basin, of 700 km^{2}, composes the hydrographic region of the Southeast Atlantic, covering the municipalities of Fundão, Ibiraçu, Santa Leopoldina, Santa Teresa and Serra. It is limited to the north by the Riacho river basin, to the south by the River Santa Maria da Vitoria, to the west by the basin of the Doce River and the east by the Atlantic Ocean.

The river's source is in Santa Teresa. The river then crosses Fundão and flows between Praia Grande and Nova Almeida. Its main tributaries of the Fundão are the rivers Carneiro, Timbuí and Piabas. Water transport is only possible for small boats because of the silting process.

The Reis Magos basin has the highest rainfall of Espírito Santo, with an annual rainfall of 1,700mm and a maximum of 2,500mm.

== See also ==
- List of rivers of Espírito Santo
