= Santa Maria da Vitória River =

Coordinates: 20°19′S 40°17′W

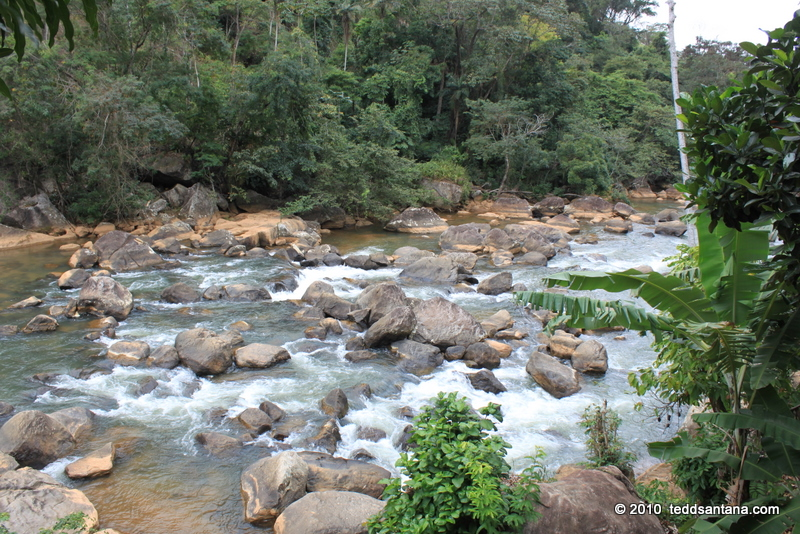

Location
- Country: Brazil

Physical characteristics
- Source
  - location: Espírito Santo state

The Santa Maria da Vitória River is a river of Espírito Santo state in eastern Brazil.

== See also ==
- List of rivers of Espírito Santo
