= Itaúnas River =

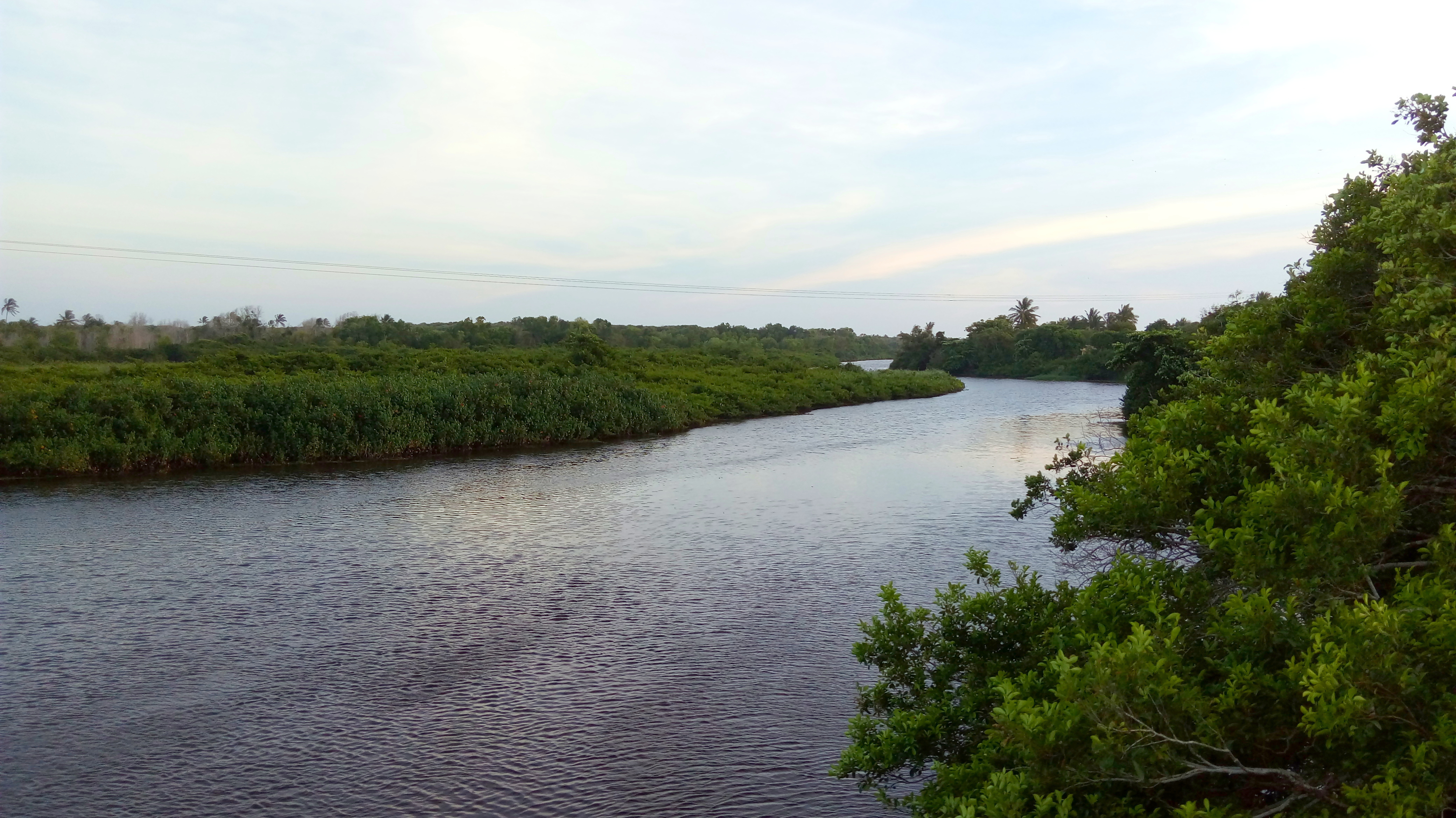

- Location within Brazil
- Native name: Rio Itaúnas (Portuguese)

Location
- Country: Brazil

Physical characteristics
- Source
  - location: Espírito Santo state
- Mouth
  - location: Atlantic Ocean
  - coordinates: 18.534590°S 39.732108°W

The Itaúnas River (Portuguese: Itaúnas) is a river of Espírito Santo state in eastern Brazil.

The 3,481 hectares (8,600 acres) Itaúnas State Park, created in 1991, is named after the Itaúnas River, which runs through the park for 34 kilometres (21 mi). The river approaches the coast at the settlement of Itaúnas and then runs southwest, parallel to the coast behind a sand bar, before entering the Atlantic Ocean to the north of Conceição da Barra.

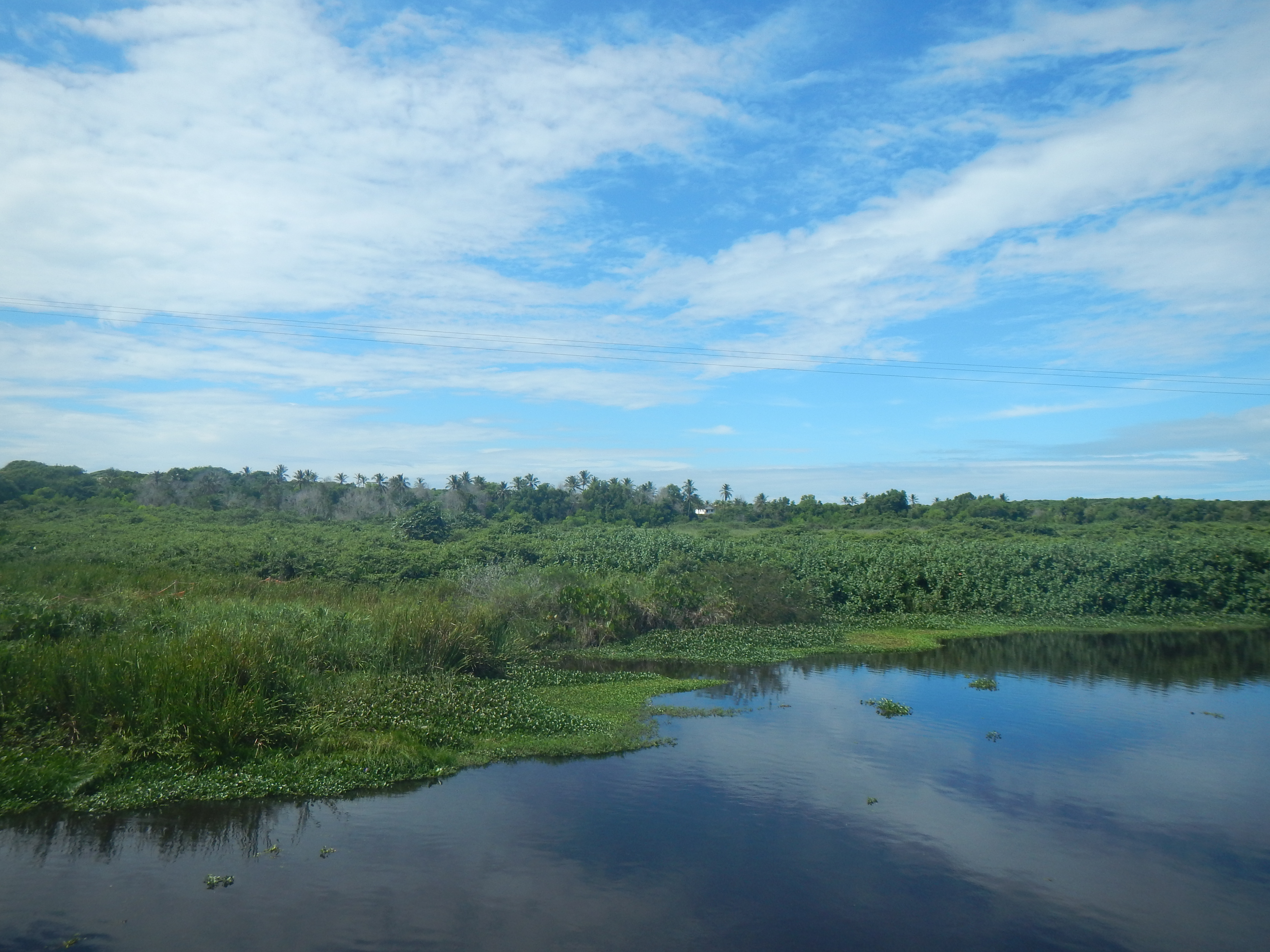

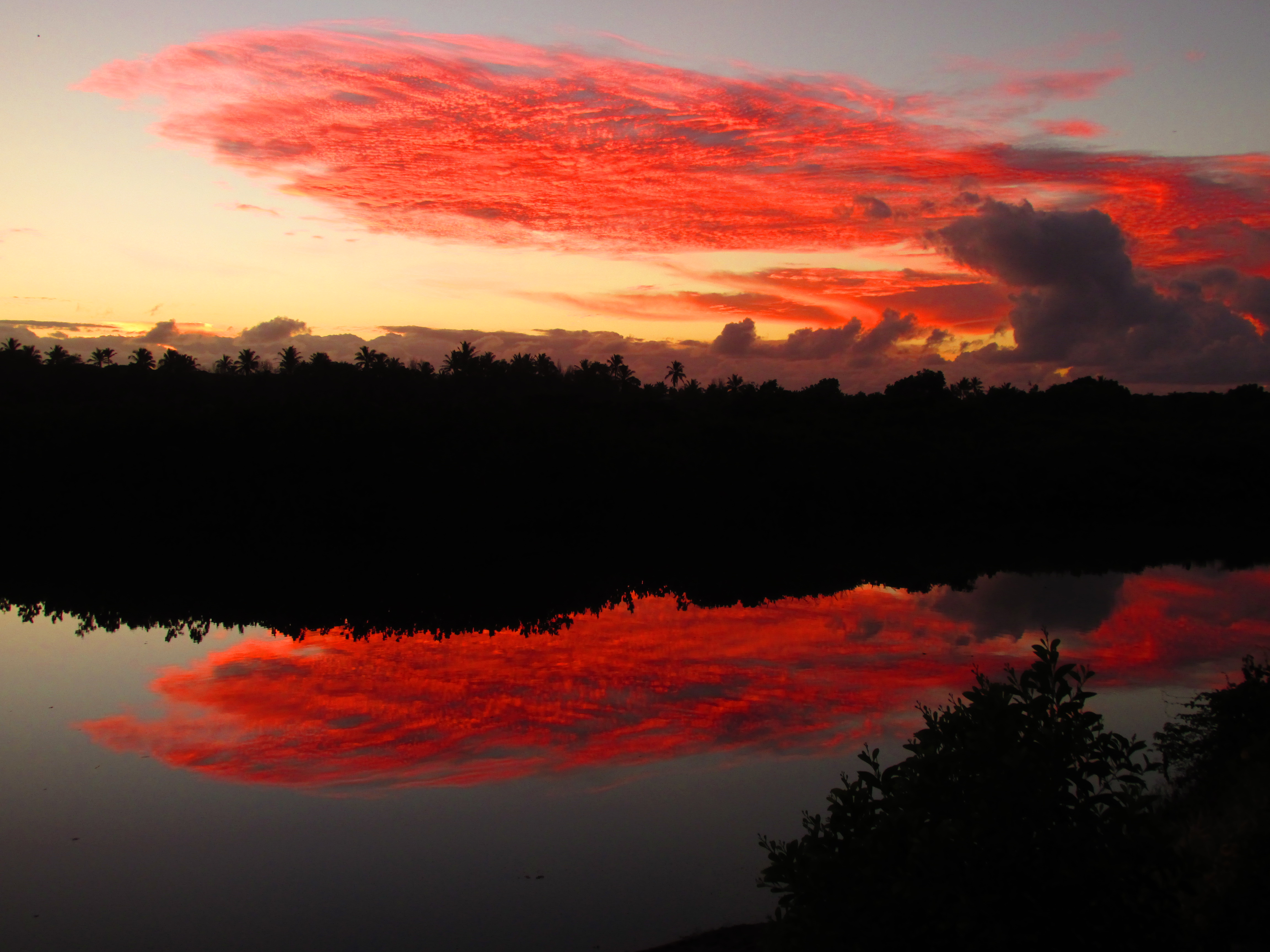
Itaúnas River at dawn

== See also ==
- List of rivers of Espírito Santo

== Sources ==
- Parque Estadual de Itaúnas (in Portuguese), IEMA: Instituto Estadual de Meio Ambiente e Recursos Hídricos, archived from the original on 2016-10-27
- Plano de Manejo do Parque Estadual de Itaúnas (in Portuguese), vol. 1 – Informações gerais do parque, CEPEMAR – Serviços de Consultoria em Meio Ambiente, August 2004, archived from the original on 2016-10-27
