= São Mateus River =

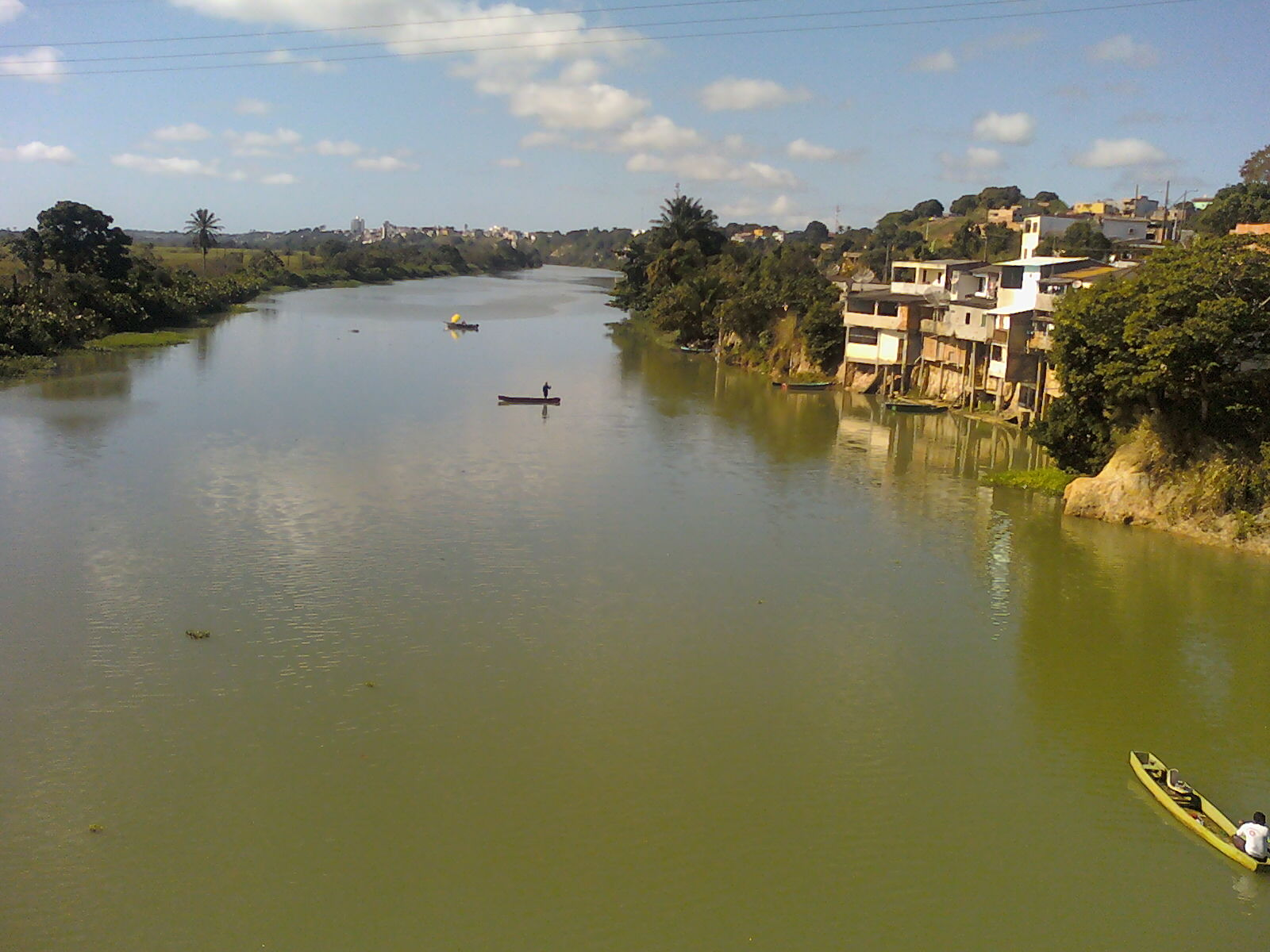
- In the town of São Mateus, Espírito Santo

- Location within Brazil

Location
- Country: Brazil

Physical characteristics
- Source
  - location: São Félix de Minas - Minas Gerais
- Mouth
  - location: South Atlantic Ocean
  - coordinates: 18°36′15″S 039°43′39″W
- Length: 224 km (139 mi) (north fork), 188 km (117 mi) (south fork)
- Basin size: 10,335 km^{2} (3,990 sq mi)

The São Mateus River is a river primarily in Espírito Santo state in eastern Brazil.

== Course ==
The São Mateus River rises in the Brazilian state of Minas Gerais in the municipality of São Félix de Minas, where it is known as Braço Sul do Rio São Mateus (the southern branch) or Rio Cricaré. Its principal tributary is the Cotoxé River (or northern branch), which also arises in Minas Gerais near the source of the southern branch, in an area called "Alto São Mateus". The two come together near the village of Lagoa at 18°39′02″S 40°05′37″W, and the São Mateus River flows 65 more kilometers, through the city of São Mateus, and empties into the South Atlantic Ocean near the town of Conceição da Barra, in the state of Espírito Santo. In addition, other rivers such as the São Domingos, the Santana, the Mariricu, and the Rio Prêto are part of the São Mateus River's hydrological system.

== See also ==
- List of rivers of Espírito Santo
