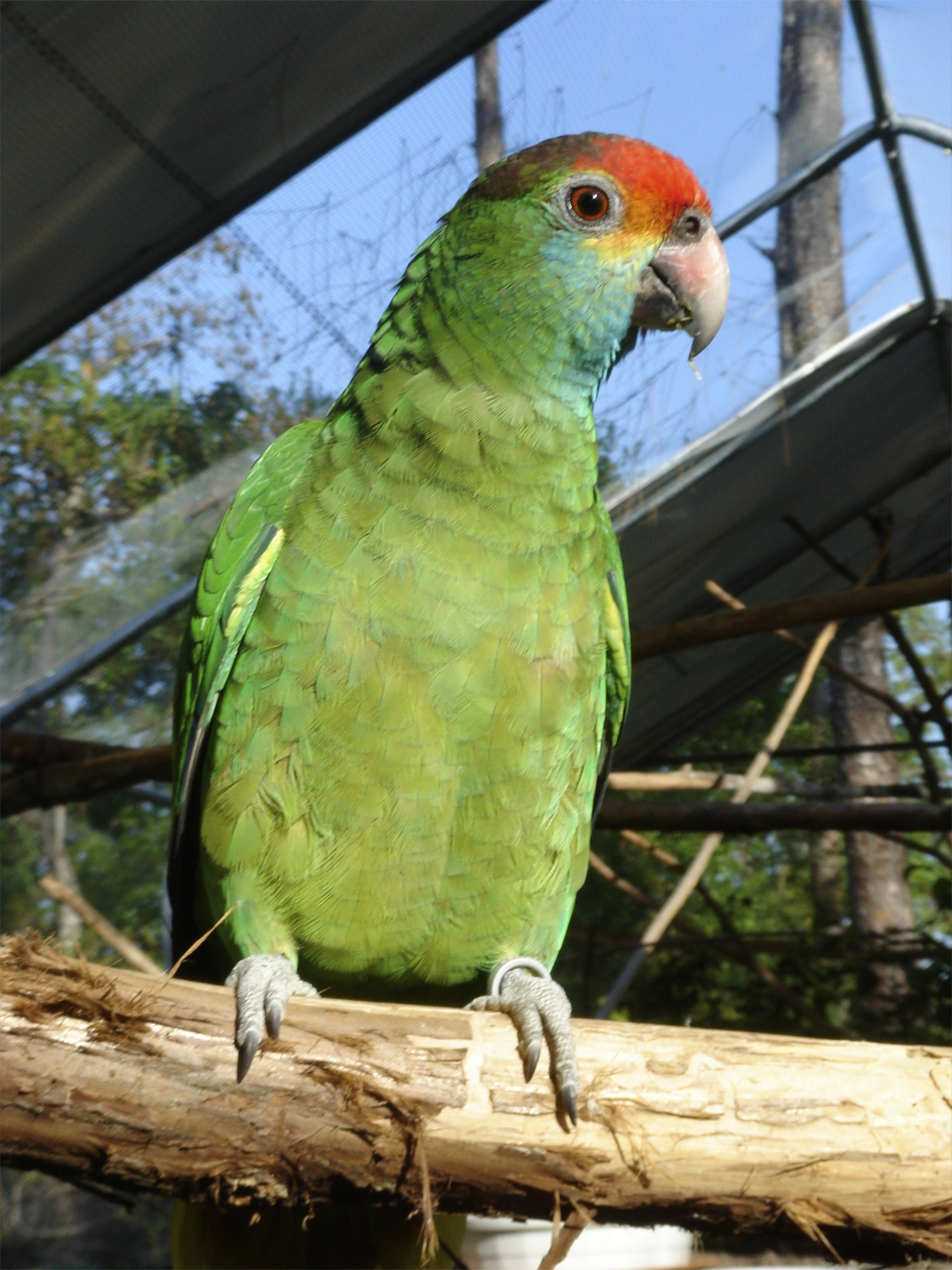

Conservation status
- Vulnerable (IUCN 3.1)
- CITES Appendix I

Scientific classification
- Kingdom: Animalia
- Phylum: Chordata
- Class: Aves
- Order: Psittaciformes
- Family: Psittacidae
- Genus: Amazona
- Species: A. rhodocorytha

Binomial name
- Amazona rhodocorytha (Salvadori, 1890)

Synonyms
- Red-browed parrot

= Red-browed amazon =

Species of bird

The red-browed amazon (Amazona rhodocorytha) is a species of parrot in the family Psittacidae. It is endemic to Atlantic Forest in eastern Brazil. It has been considered a subspecies of the blue-cheeked amazon (Amazona dufresniana), but today all major authorities consider them separate species. It is threatened both by habitat loss and by being captured for the trade in wild parrots.

== Description ==
The red-browed amazon has a bright red crown fading to purplish-brown at the back. The cheeks and throat are blue and the wing and body plumage is green with dark markings on the back of the neck. Black and red patches can be seen on the wings when they are spread and the tail feathers have red markings and are tipped with yellow. The beak and legs are grey and the iris of the eye is orange-brown.

== Distribution and habitat ==
The red-browed amazon is endemic to tropical forests in eastern Brazil. It used to be widespread across the region but is now restricted to some of the larger remaining forest blocks. The largest of these is in the state of Espírito Santo and the bird is also present in three forest areas in south east Bahia and five in the states of Rio de Janeiro and Minas Gerais. Another location is in the north of the state of São Paulo and a further one in São Miguel dos Campos in the east of the state of Alagoas. The rest of this state seems to be suitable habitat but it has not been observed to be present there recently.

== Behaviour ==
The red-browed amazon feeds in small groups on fruit, berries, seeds and buds which it finds in the rainforest canopy. Breeding takes place between September and November. A pair of red-browed amazons maintain a territory and the nest is usually made in a cavity in a tree, the same site being used year after year. In captivity, a clutch of four eggs are usually laid, incubation takes 24 days and the young are fledged 34 days after hatching.

== Status ==
The red-browed amazon used to be abundant in its rainforest habitat but its numbers appear to have decreased significantly. About 2,300 individuals were counted in Espírito Santo during a survey undertaken between 2004 and 2006 and it remains common at a few sites in the state such as on the island of Ilha Grande, at Sooretama and nearby Linhares. The major threat faced by this parrot is habitat degradation with less than ten percent of the original forest cover remaining in Espírito Santo. Most of the land has been cleared of timber and converted to pasture and plantations. Another threat is the illegal collection of young birds for the international pet trade. This bird is present in several wildlife reserves but is not effectively protected against poaching even there. For all these reasons, the IUCN, in its Red List of Endangered Species, has assessed the Red-browed amazon as "Vulnerable".
