= Itabapoana River =

Itabapoana
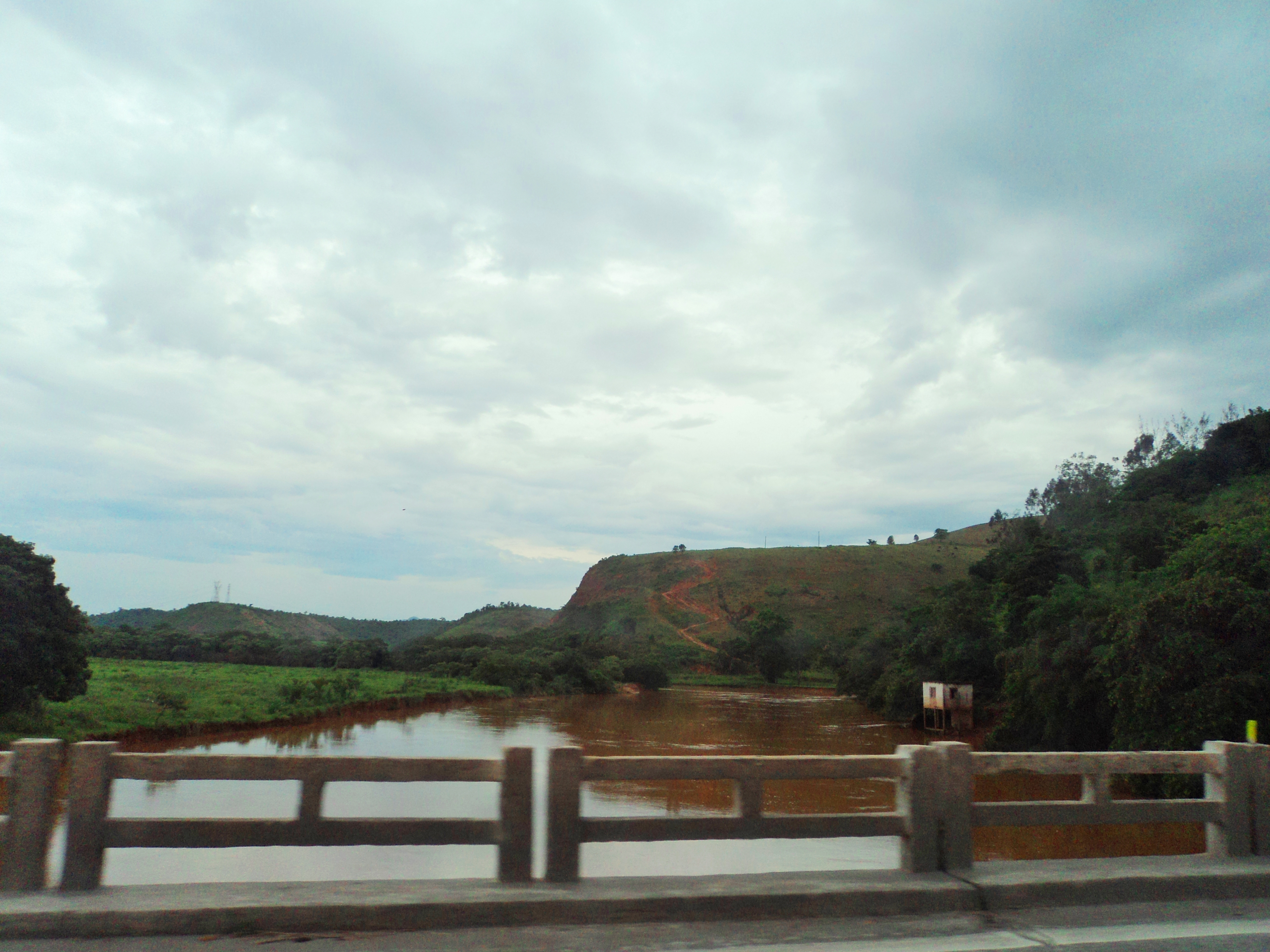

Location
- Country: Brazil

Physical characteristics
- Source
  - location: Minas Gerais state
- Mouth: Atlantic Ocean
  - coordinates: 21°18′S 40°58′W

The Itabapoana is a river forming the border between Espírito Santo and Rio de Janeiro states in eastern Brazil.

== See also ==
- List of rivers of Espírito Santo
- List of rivers of Minas Gerais
- List of rivers of Rio de Janeiro
