= Itapemirim River =

Coordinates: 21°00′20″S 40°48′20″W

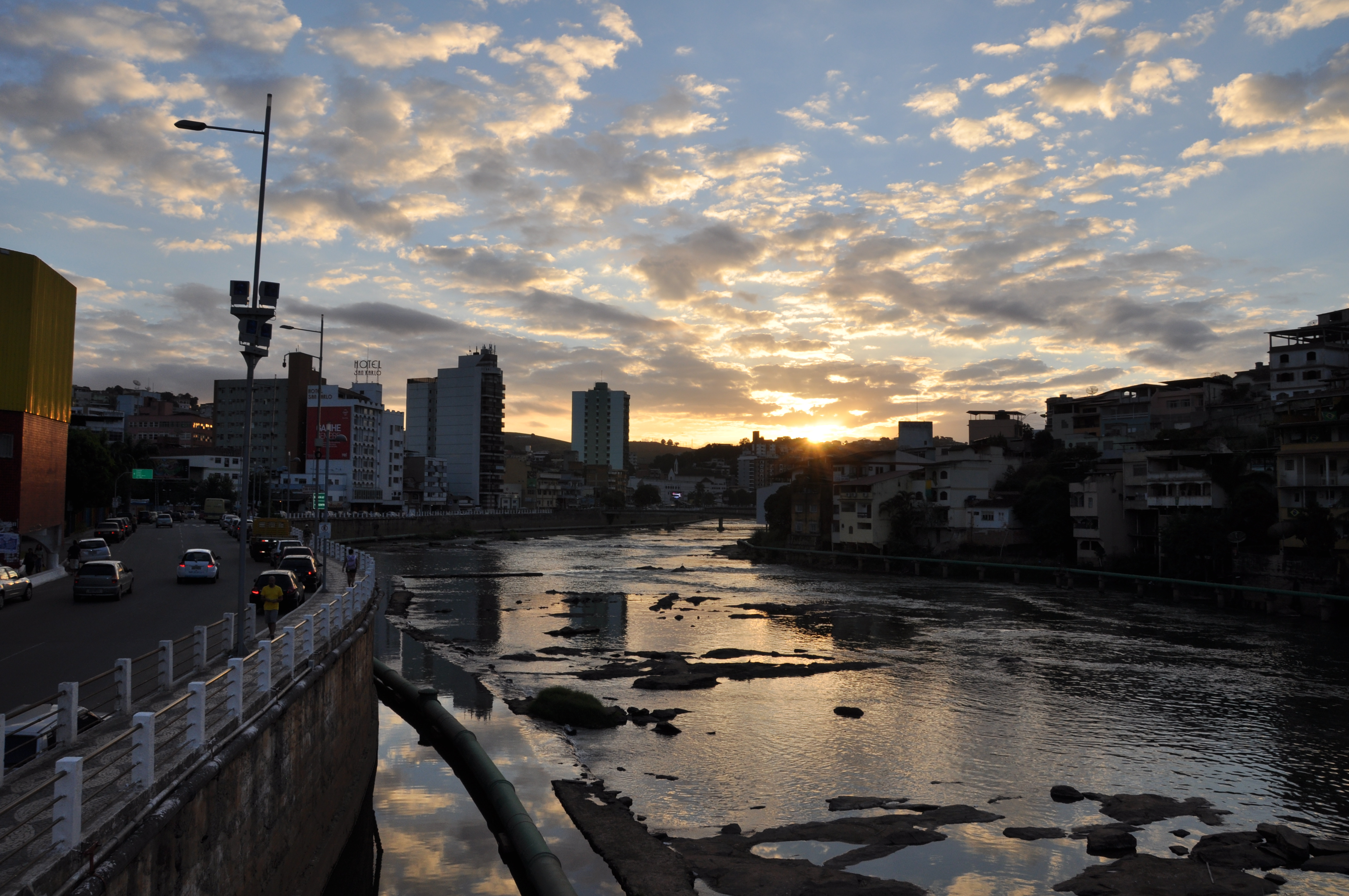

Location
- Country: Brazil

Physical characteristics
- Source
  - location: Espírito Santo state

The Itapemirim River is a river of Espírito Santo state in eastern Brazil.

== See also ==
- List of rivers of Espírito Santo
