= Itapemirim =

Itapemirim may refer to the following:

- Itapemirim River, a river in the state of Espírito Santo, Brazil
- Itapemirim, Espírito Santo, a municipality in the same state
- Itapemirim (bus company), a bus company from that city
- ITA Transportes Aéreos, a Brazilian airline relaunched in 2021
