= Itapemirim Transportes Aéreos (1990–2000) =

Brazilian airline

IATA	ICAO	Call sign
K9	IPM	ITAPEMIRIM
- Founded: 1990; 36 years ago in Rio de Janeiro, Rio de Janeiro, Brazil
- Commenced operations: January 1991
- Ceased operations: 2000
- Parent company: Itapemirim (1990-1998); TAM Linhas Aéreas (1998-2000)
- Headquarters: Rio de Janeiro, Rio de Janeiro, Brazil
- Key people: Camilo Cola

Itapemirim Transportes Aéreos S.A., also operating as Itapemirim Cargo, was a Brazilian passenger and cargo airline founded in 1990 and totally defunct in 2000.

== History ==
Itapemirim Transportes Aéreos was founded in 1990 as an air-cargo division of Viação Itapemirim, one of the largest bus companies for passengers and cargo in Brazil. Flights started in January 1991 and operated in intermodal fashion, integrating air and land (buses and trucks) transportation. In 1996 a division for regional passenger flights was created and its flights started in 1997. However, in 1998 it was sold to TAM Linhas Aéreas. In 1999 all its cargo aircraft were sold and in 2000 the airline permanently ceased its activities.

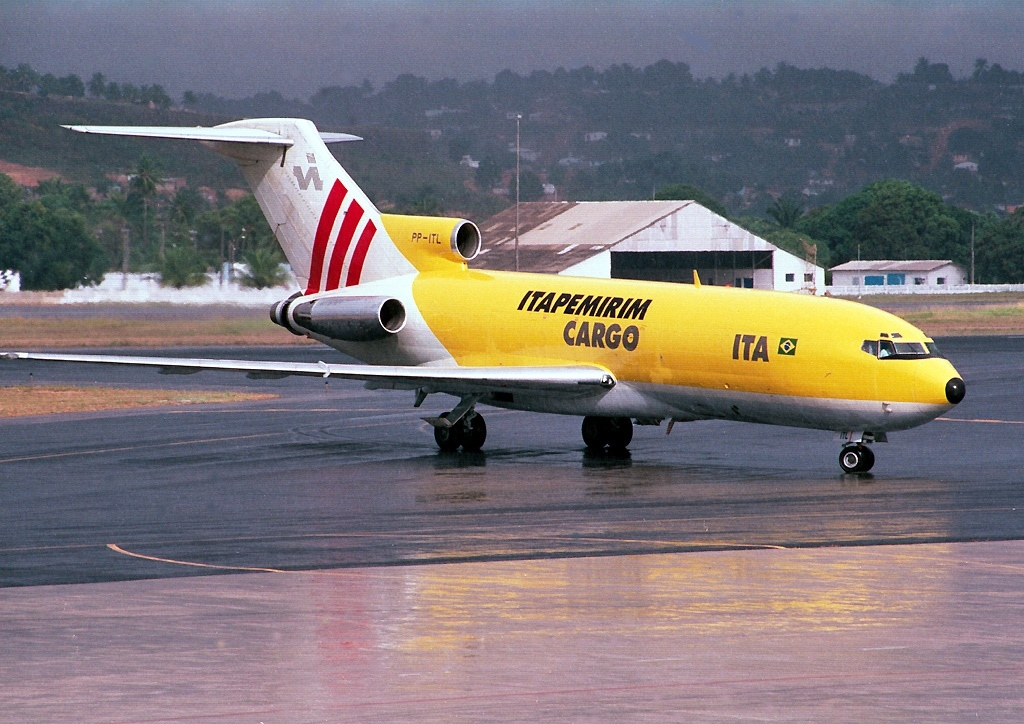
An Itapemirim Boeing 727-100F at Recife/Guararapes–Gilberto Freyre International Airport in 1998

== Destinations ==
Itapemirim served the following cities:

City	Airport	Notes
Belém	Belém/Val-de-Cans International Airport	Cargo
Brasília	Brasília International Airport	Cargo
Cachoeiro de Itapemirim	Cachoeiro de Itapemirim Airport	Passenger
Campinas	Viracopos International Airport	Cargo
Florianópolis	Hercílio Luz International Airport	Cargo
Fortaleza	Fortaleza Airport	Cargo
Manaus	Eduardo Gomes International Airport	Cargo
Porto Alegre	Salgado Filho Porto Alegre International Airport	Cargo
Recife	Recife/Guararapes–Gilberto Freyre International Airport	Cargo
Resende	Resende Airport	Passenger
Rio de Janeiro	Rio de Janeiro/Galeão International Airport	Cargo
Rio de Janeiro	Santos Dumont Airport	Passenger
Salvador da Bahia	Salvador International Airport	Cargo
São Paulo	São Paulo–Congonhas Airport	Passenger
São Paulo	São Paulo/Guarulhos International Airport	Cargo

== Fleet ==
Itapemirim operated the following aircraft:

Itapemirim fleet
Aircraft	Total	Introduced	Retired
Boeing 727-100F	4	1990	1999
Boeing 727-200F	2	1996	1999
Cessna 208B Grand Caravan	2	1996	1998

== See also ==
- List of defunct airlines of Brazil
