= Mata das Flores State Park =

State park in Espírito Santo, Brazil

- Parque Estadual de Mata das Flores
- IUCN category II (national park)
- Location within Brazil
- Nearest city: Castelo, Espírito Santo
- Coordinates: 20°36′39″S 41°10′14″W
- Area: 800 hectares (2,000 acres)
- Designation: State park
- Created: 2 January 1992
- Administrator: IEMA

The Mata das Flores State Park (Portuguese: Parque Estadual de Mata das Flores) is a state park in the state of Espírito Santo, Brazil.

== Location ==
The Mata das Flores State Park is in the municipality of Castelo, Espírito Santo, with an area of about 800 hectares (2,000 acres). It is surrounded by coffee plantations. It holds an important remnant of Atlantic Forest and provides an ecological corridor from the warmer lowlands to the higher and colder Forno Grande and Pedra Azul state parks. The park is popular for hiking and cycling among the large trees.

The main biome is dense montane semideciduous rainforest. Vegetation include Cedrela, Cassia, bromeliads and palms. The park contains examples of the giant jequitibá rosa (Cariniana legalis) as well as delicate orchids. It takes ten adults holding hands to encircle some of the jequitibás, which may be over 3,000 years old. Fauna include hawks, toucans, owls, pacas, foxes, sloths, hedgehogs and capuchin monkeys.

== History ==
The Mata das Flores State Park was created by state law 4.617 of 2 January 1992. It became part of the Central Atlantic Forest Ecological Corridor, created in 2002.

== Sources ==
- Lamas, Ivana Reis; Crepaldi, Maria Otávia; Mesquita, Carlos Alberto Bernardo (2015), Uma Rede no Corredor (PDF) (in Portuguese), Conservação Internacional (CI-Brasil), ISBN 978-85-98830-28-5, archived from the original (PDF) on 2019-03-29
- Parque Estadual de Mata das Flores (in Portuguese), IEMA: Instituto Estadual de Meio Ambiente e Recursos Hídricos, archived from the original on 2016-10-27
- "Parque Estadual Mata das Flores", Portal Castelo (in Portuguese)
- "Reserva Florestal Mata das Flores", Descubra Castelo (in Portuguese)
