= Castelo, Espírito Santo =

Castelo
- Municipality
- Municipality of Castelo
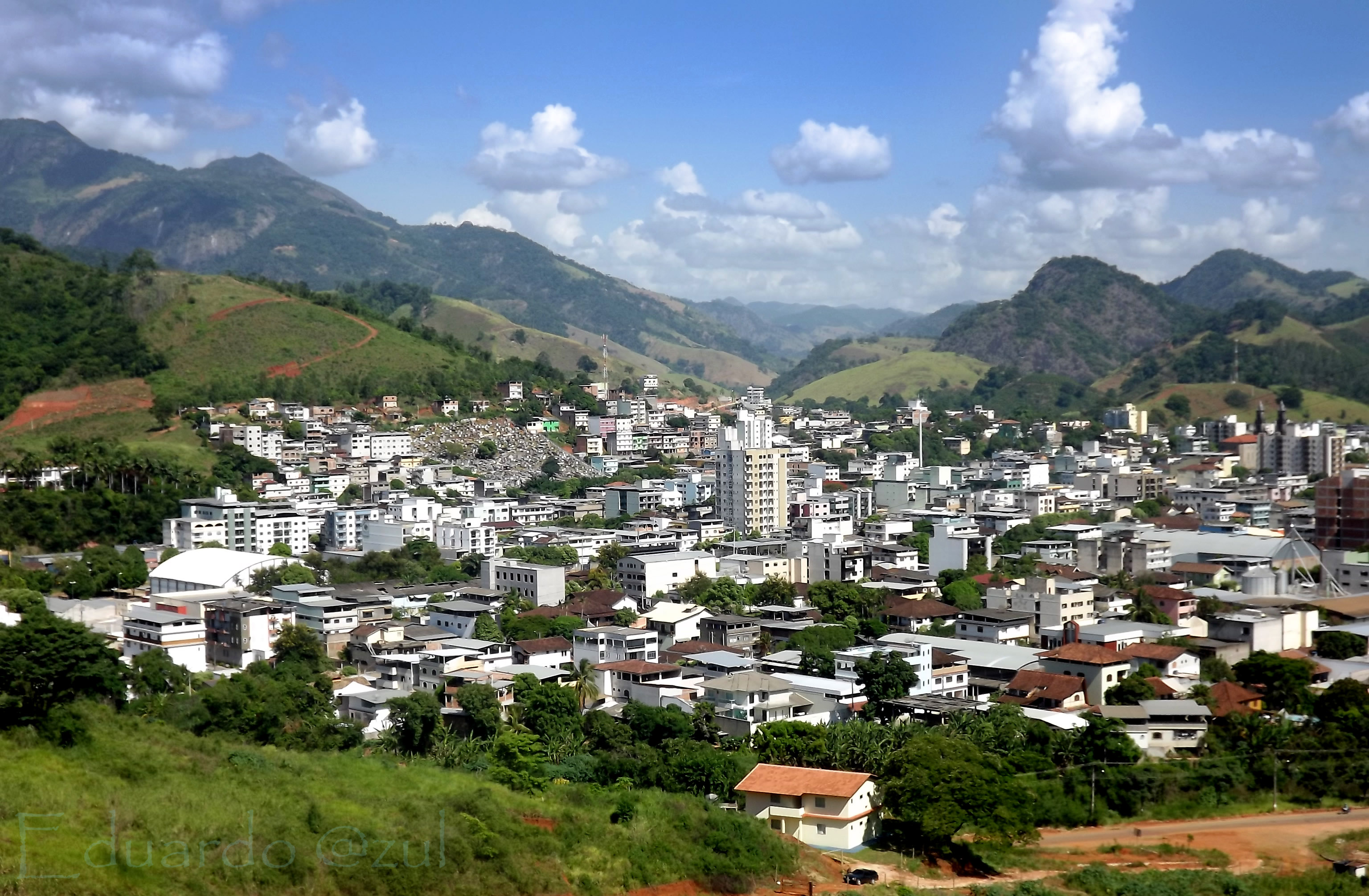
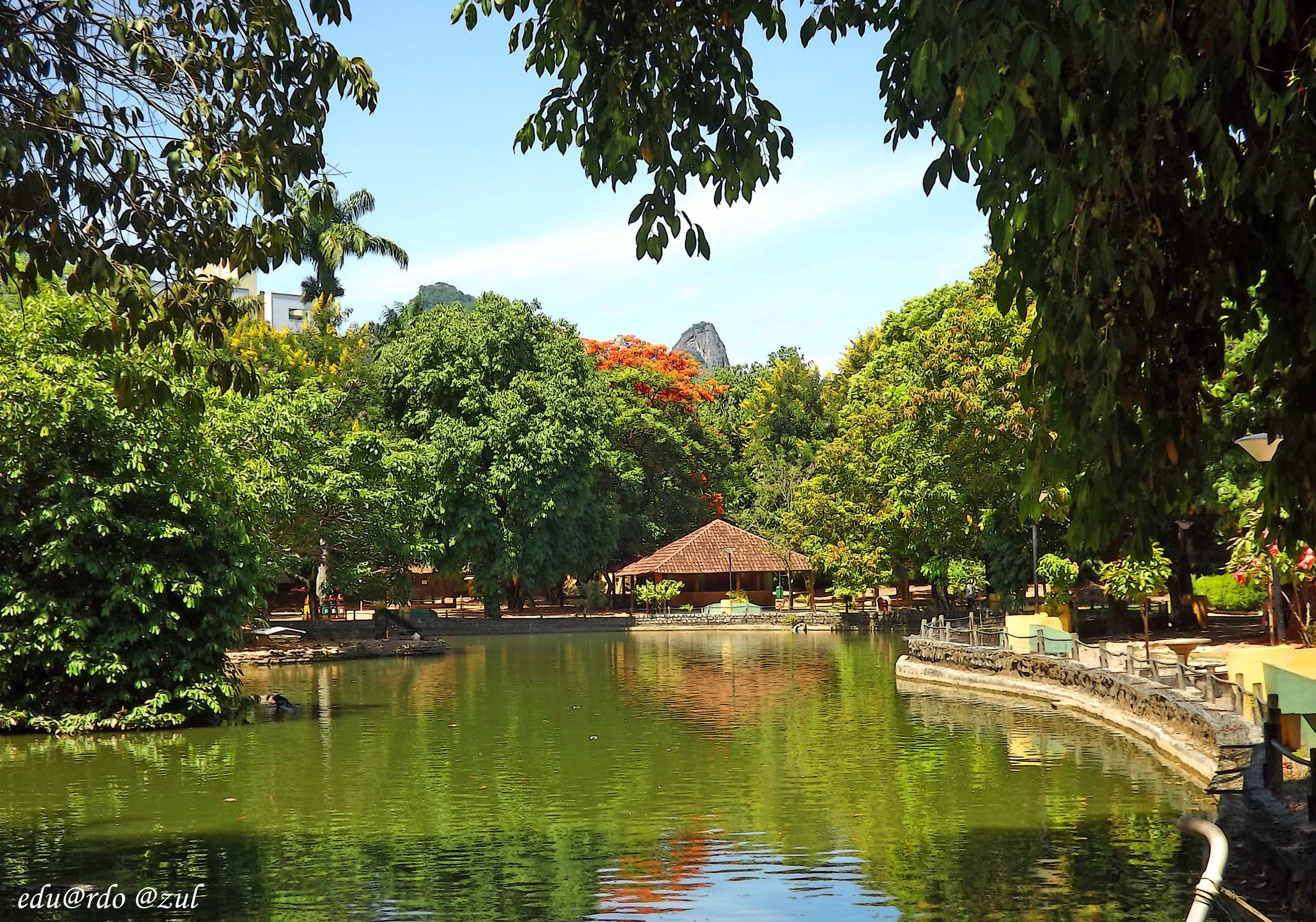
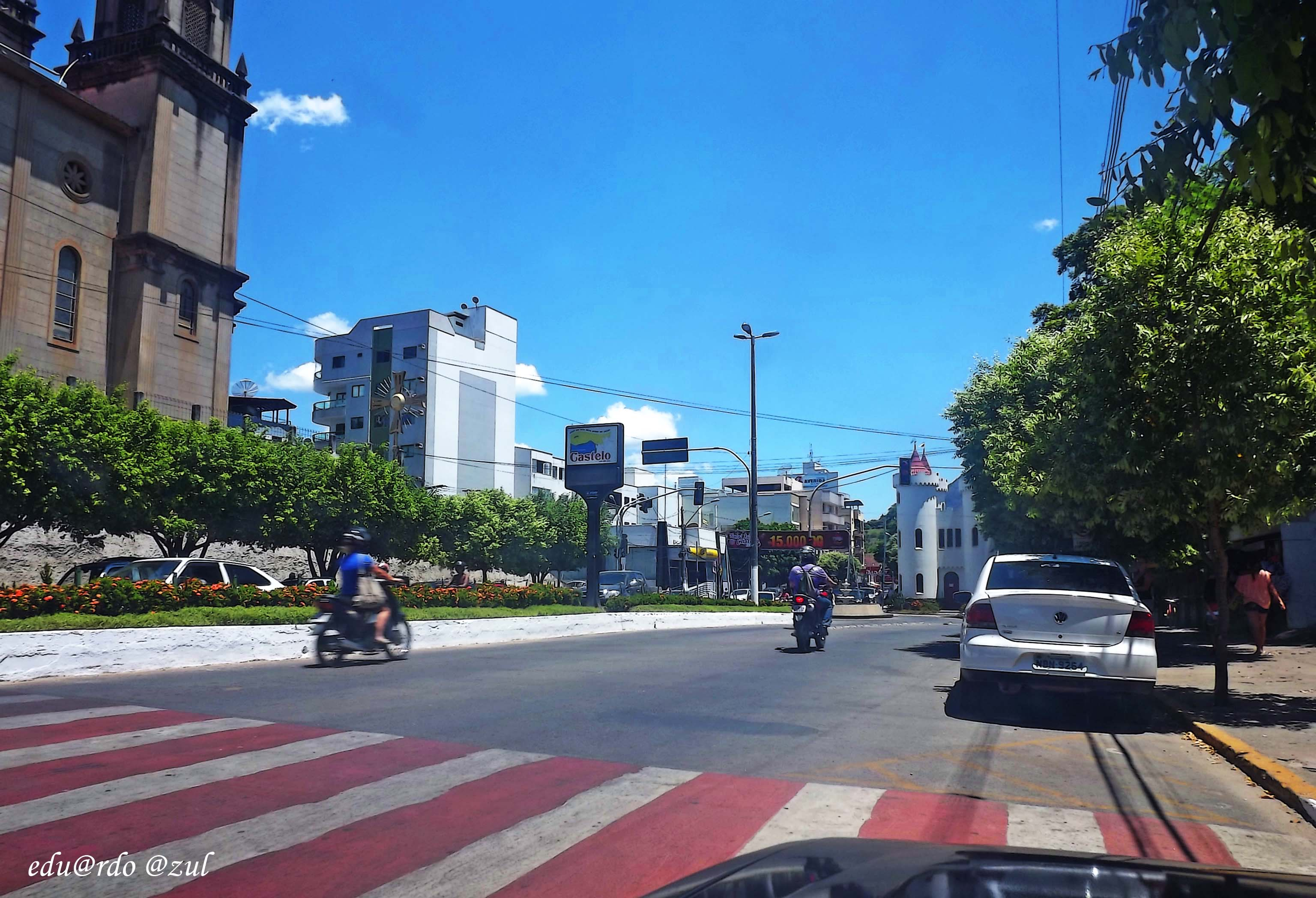
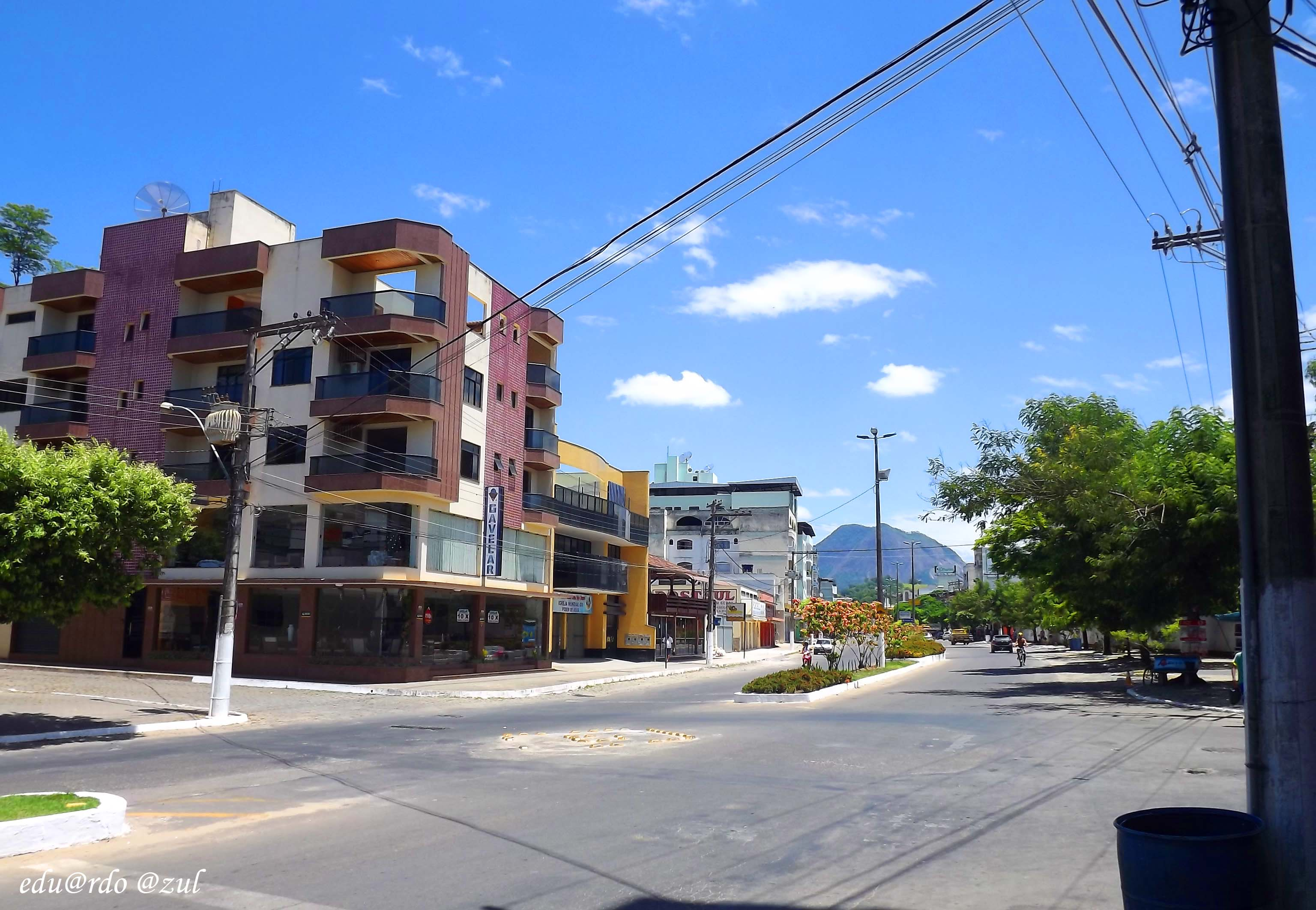

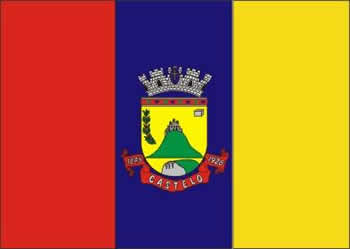
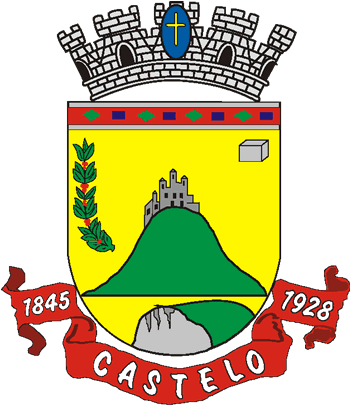
- Flag Coat of arms

- Location in Espírito Santo
- Coordinates: 20°36′14″S 41°11′6″W
- Country: Brazil
- Region: Southeast
- State: Espírito Santo
- Established: 25 December 1928

Government
  - Mayor: João Paulo Silva Nali (PTB)

Area
  - Total: 664 km^{2} (256 sq mi)

Population (2020)
  - Total: 37,747
  - Density: 56.8/km^{2} (147/sq mi)
- Time zone: UTC−3 (BRT)
- HDI (2010): 0.726 – high
- Website: castelo.es.gov.br/site

Castelo is a municipality in the southwest of the state of Espírito Santo in Brazil. Its population was 37,747 (2020) and its area is 664 km^{2} (256 sq mi).

== History ==
There is information on two Amerindian tribes inhabiting the area before the colonial era. The main tribe was called Puris, and the secondary, with less presence, were the Botocudos. The first non-native immigration into the region was of gold prospectors who moved into the area, but this was a short-lived adventure which by 1830 had been abandoned. After 1830, local interest turned towards the land. Medium-sized properties were established using slave labour until 1888, when it was abolished. Soon after, Italian immigrants from the neighbouring municipality of Alfredo Chaves began to settle in Castelo. In 1891 Castelo became a district of Cachoeiro de Itapemirim and remained part of Cachoeiro de Itapemirim until 1928, when it separated.

== Geography ==
Highest point in the municipality is the Forno Grande Peak (2039 m), which is also the highest point in the state after Bandeira Peak, shared with Minas Gerais.

Castelo is 145 km from the state capital Vitória, and stands at 100 meters above sea level. Castelo's borders are: Alfredo Chaves and Domingos Martins (E), Venda Nova do Imigrante and Conceição do Castelo (N), Muniz Freire and Alegre (W) and Cachoeiro de Itapemirim (S).

The municipality contains the 730-hectare (1,800-acre) Forno Grande State Park, which protects the second highest peak in the state. It also contains the 800-hectare (2,000-acre) Mata das Flores State Park, created in 1992.

== Population ==
Castelo is strongly influenced by Italian immigrants, who make up the great majority of the municipality's population. This influences today's traditional commemorations, very much Catholic-based in traditions like Corpus Christi. This influence is also felt in the traditional Italian Folklore dance group, which still practices traditional Piedmontese dances.

== Notable people ==
- Cícero — Brazilian football player
- Alessandro Celin — Brazilian football player
- Renato Casagrande — Politician
- Gerson Camata — Politician
