= Central Atlantic Forest Ecological Corridor =

Ecological corridor in Brazil

- Corredor Central da Mata Atlântica
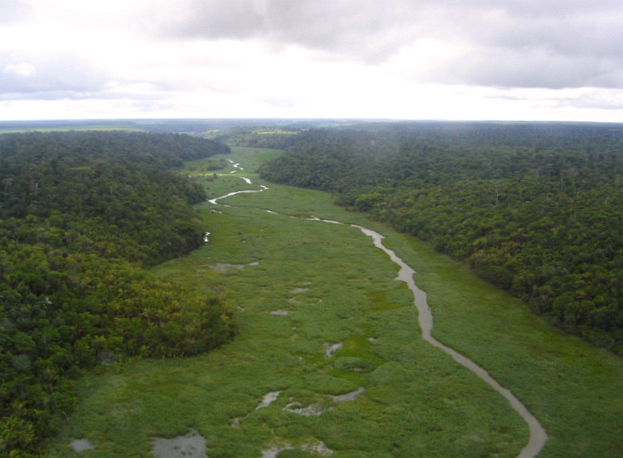
- Rio Preto National Forest

- Location within Brazil
- Coordinates: 16.768764°S 39.205427°W
- Designation: Ecological corridor
- Created: March 2002
- Administrator: Federal Ministry of the Environment

The Central Atlantic Forest Ecological Corridor (Portuguese: Corredor Central da Mata Atlântica) is an ecological corridor in the states of Espírito Santo and Bahia, Brazil. It promotes improvements to connectivity between fragments of Atlantic Forest in the region with the goal of maintaining genetic health among flora and fauna. The greater Atlantic Forest is also home to many native endangered or vulnerable species that are endemic to this part of the globe including but not limited to the: golden lion tamarin, three-toed sloth, and the bristle-spined rat. The Central Ecological Corridor is beneficial in connecting hundreds of at-risk populations experiencing reduced gene flow and genetic variation due to deforestation.

== History ==
The corridor was created as part of the Ecological Corridors Project, for which the final evaluation was completed by the Ministry of the Environment in December 2000. A grant agreement between the World Bank and the Ministry of the Environment was signed in December 2001. The project was effective as of March 2002. Priority was given to the implementation of the Central Amazon Ecological Corridor and the Central Atlantic Forest Ecological Corridor to test different conditions in the two biomes and use the lessons learned to prepare and support creation of other corridors.

In the central corridor the state committees of the Atlantic Forest Biosphere Reserve act as project management committees, with representatives from traditional populations, environmental NGOs, producers and businesses and the three levels of government. The strategy is to ensure protection of significant forest remnants and gradually increase the amount of connection between core portions of the landscape through control, protection and recovery of forest cover and development of sustainable production activities that contribute to the connections.

== Location ==
As of 2006 the corridor had over 8,500,000 hectares (21,000,000 acres), covering the whole of Espírito Santo and the south of Bahia. As of 2006 the corridor included 83 protected areas. Of these, state-level units accounted for 53% of the area, 16 federal units covered 245,036 hectares (605,500 acres) and private reserves covered 11,145 hectares (27,540 acres).

As of 2015 the Central Atlantic Forest Corridor encompassed an area of about 21,500,000 hectares (53,000,000 acres), and extended about 1,200 kilometres (750 mi) from north to south. This included areas of sea up to the edge of the continental shelf. About 95% of the corridor was privately owned land, in 163 municipalities. There were 128 conservation units covering about 2,200,000 hectares (5,400,000 acres). In Bahia there were 10 federal, 15 state, 7 municipal and 28 private natural heritage reserves. In Espírito Santo there were 21 federal, 17 state, 17 municipal and 41 private reserves.

There are two centers of endemism. The region has various types of rainforest including semi-deciduous forest, restingas and mangroves along river estuaries. The forest has great diversity of woody plant species. Up to 458 tree species have been found in 1 hectare (2.5 acres) of forest in southern Bahia.

== Conservation units ==
The lists of protected areas below exclude the many private reserves included in the corridor.

=== Fully protected units ===
Fully protected units in the corridor include:

Name	Type	Area (ha)	State	Level	Created
Abrolhos Marine	National park	87,942.03	Bahia	Federal	1983
Alto Cariri	National park	19,238.02	Bahia	Federal	2010
Aricanga Waldemar Devens	Municipal nature park	515.68	Espírito Santo	Municipal	1997
Augusto Ruschi	Biological reserve	3,562.28	Espírito Santo	Federal	1982
Bicanga	Municipal nature park	88.69	Espírito Santo	Municipal	2007
Boa Esperança	Municipal nature park	437.00	Bahia	Municipal	2001
Boa Nova	National park	12,065.31	Bahia	Federal	2010
Boa Nova	Wildlife refuge	15,023.86	Bahia	Federal	2010
Cachoeira da Fumaça	State park	162.00	Espírito Santo	State	1984
Caparaó	National park	31,762.93	Espírito Santo / Minas Gerais	Federal	1961
Comboios	Biological reserve	784.63	Espírito Santo	Federal	1984
Coroa Alta	Municipal nature park		Bahia	Municipal	1998
Córrego Grande	Biological reserve	1,503.75	Espírito Santo	Federal	1989
Córrego do Veado	Biological reserve	2,357.73	Espírito Santo	Federal	1982
David Victor Farina	Municipal nature park	44.00	Espírito Santo	Municipal	1995
Descobrimento	National park	22,693.97	Bahia	Federal	1999
Dom Luiz Gonzaga Fernandes	Municipal nature park	63.88	Espírito Santo	Municipal	1998
Domingos Martins	Municipal nature park	56.00	Espírito Santo	Municipal	2010
Duas Bocas	Biological reserve	2,910.00	Espírito Santo	State	1965
Falésias de Marataízes	Natural monument	42.14	Espírito Santo	Municipal	2008
Forno Grande	State park	730.00	Espírito Santo	State	1998
Frade e a Freira	Natural monument	861.00	Espírito Santo	State	2007
Goiapaba-Açu	Municipal nature park	235.00	Espírito Santo	Municipal	1991
Gruta da Onça	Municipal nature park	6.89	Espírito Santo	Municipal	1988
Ilha do Lameirão	Ecological station	891.83	Espírito Santo	Municipal	1986
Ilha do Medo	Ecological station	1.00	Bahia	Municipal	1991
Ilhéus	Municipal nature park	773.40	Bahia	Municipal	2006
Itabira	Natural monument	450.00	Espírito Santo	Municipal	1988
Itaúnas	State park	3,481.00	Espírito Santo	State	1991
Jacarenema	Municipal nature park	346.27	Espírito Santo	Municipal	2003
Manguezal de Itanguá	Municipal nature park	31.00	Espírito Santo	Municipal	2007
Marinho do Recife de Fora	Municipal nature park	1,750.00	Bahia	Municipal	1997
Mata das Flores	State park	800.00	Espírito Santo	State	1992
Monte Moxuara	Municipal nature park	436.00	Espírito Santo	Municipal	2007
Monte Pascoal	National park	22,331.91	Bahia	Federal	1961
Morro da Gamela	Municipal nature park	29.53	Espírito Santo	Municipal	2007
Morro da Manteigueira	Municipal nature park	168.30	Espírito Santo	Municipal	1993
Morro da Pescaria	Municipal nature park	127.00	Espírito Santo	Municipal	1997
Morro do Penedo	Natural monument	18.79	Espírito Santo	Municipal	2007
Papagaio	Ecological station	457.00	Espírito Santo	Municipal	1992
Pau-Brasil	National park	19,027.22	Bahia	Federal	1999
Paulo César Vinha	State park	1,500.00	Espírito Santo	State	1990
Pedra Azul	State park	1,240.00	Espírito Santo	State	1991
Pedra dos Olhos	Municipal nature park	27.96	Espírito Santo	Municipal	2003
Pontões Capixabas	Natural monument	17,443.43	Espírito Santo	Federal	2003
Puris	Municipal nature park	36.63	Espírito Santo	Municipal	2013
Recife de Areia	Municipal nature park		Bahia	Municipal	1999
Rio dos Frades	Wildlife refuge	898.67	Bahia	Federal	2007
Rota das Garças	Municipal nature park	20.10	Espírito Santo	Municipal	2002
Santa Cruz	Wildlife refuge	17,709.39	Espírito Santo	Federal	2010
São Lourenço	Municipal nature park	265.91	Espírito Santo	Municipal	2004
Serra das Lontras	National park	11,343.69	Bahia	Federal	2010
Serra das Torres	Natural monument	10,458.90	Espírito Santo	State	2010
Sooretama	Biological reserve	27,858.68	Espírito Santo	Federal	1982
Tabuazeiro	Municipal nature park	5.10	Espírito Santo	Municipal	1995
Una	Biological reserve	18,715.06	Bahia	Federal	1980
Una	Wildlife refuge	23,262.09	Bahia	Federal	2007
Vale do Mulembá	Municipal nature park	142.10	Espírito Santo	Municipal	2002
Von Schilgen	Municipal nature park	7.15	Espírito Santo	Municipal	2004
Wenceslau Guimarães	Ecological station	2,418.00	Bahia	State	1997

=== Sustainable use units ===
Sustainable use units in the corridor include:

Name	Type	Area (ha)	State	Level	Created
Baía de Iguape	Extractive reserve	10,082.45	Bahia	Federal	2000
Canavieiras	Extractive reserve	100,726.36	Bahia	Federal	2006
Cassurubá	Extractive reserve	100,767.56	Bahia	Federal	2009
Corredor Ecológico Lagoa Encantada-Serra do Conduru	Area of relevant ecological interest	10,000.00	Bahia	Municipal	2009
Concha D'Ostra	Sustainable development reserve	953.00	Espírito Santo	State	2003
Corumbau	Extractive reserve	89,596.75	Bahia	Federal	2000
Degredo	Area of relevant ecological interest	2,460.00	Espírito Santo	Municipal	2002
Goytacazes	National forest	1,425.64	Espírito Santo	Federal	2002
Laerth Paiva Gama	Area of relevant ecological interest	27.57	Espírito Santo	Municipal	2005
Manguezal de Cariacica	Sustainable development reserve	741.00	Espírito Santo	Municipal	2007
Morro da Vargem	Area of relevant ecological interest	573.00	Espírito Santo	State	2005
Papagaio	Sustainable development reserve	1,729.70	Espírito Santo	Municipal	2011
Pacotuba	National forest	449.44	Espírito Santo	Federal	2002
Piraque-Açú e Piraque-Mirim	Sustainable development reserve	2,080.00	Espírito Santo	Municipal	1986
Rio Preto	National forest	2,817.40	Espírito Santo	Federal	1990

=== Environmental protection areas ===
Environmental protection areas in the corridor include:

Name	Area (ha)	State	Level	Created
Baía de Camamu	118,000.00	Bahia	State	2002
Cachoeira da Pancada Grande	50.00	Bahia	Municipal	1993
Caminhos Ecológicos da Boa Esperança	230,296.00	Bahia	State	2003
Candengo	7,000.00	Bahia	Municipal	1990
Caraíva / Trancoso	31,900.00	Bahia	State	1993
Conceição da Barra	7,728.00	Espírito Santo	State	1998
Coroa Vermelha	4,100.00	Bahia	State	1992
Costa de Itacaré / Serra Grande	62,960.00	Bahia	State	1993
Costa das Algas	114,803.00	Espírito Santo	Federal	2010
Costa Dourada	3,435.00	Bahia	Municipal	1999
Goiapaba – Açu	3,740.00	Espírito Santo	State	1994
Guaibim	2,000.00	Bahia	State	1992
Guanandy	5,242.00	Espírito Santo	State	1994
Ilha do Frade	35.42	Espírito Santo	Municipal	1988
Ilhas do Tinharé / Boipeba	43,300.00	Bahia	State	1992
Itapebi		Bahia	Municipal	1999
Lago de Pedra do Cavalo	30,156.00	Bahia	State	1997
Lagoa do Jacuném	1,152.88	Espírito Santo	Municipal	1998
Lagoa Encantada e Rio Almada	157,745.00	Bahia	State	1993
Lagoa Grande	2,725.20	Espírito Santo	Municipal	2006
Lapão	4,300.00	Bahia	Municipal	2001
Maciço Central	1,100.00	Espírito Santo	Municipal	1992
Manguezal Sul da Serra	1,061.00	Espírito Santo	Municipal	2012
Mestre Álvaro	3,470.00	Espírito Santo	Municipal	1991
Monte Moxuara	2,618.00	Espírito Santo	Municipal	2007
Monte Urubu	524.00	Espírito Santo	Municipal	2013
Morro do Vilante	500.00	Espírito Santo	Municipal	1999
Pedra do Elefante	2,562.00	Espírito Santo	State	2001
Península de Maraú	21,200.00	Bahia	Municipal	1997
Ponta da Baleia / Abrolhos	34,600.00	Bahia	Municipal	1993
Praia Mole	400.00	Espírito Santo	State	1994
Pratigi	85,686.00	Bahia	State	1998
Santo Antônio	23,000.00	Bahia	State	1994
Serra das Candeias	3,051.00	Bahia	Municipal	1995
Setiba	12,960.00	Espírito Santo	State	1998
Tartarugas Castelhanos	1,092.00	Espírito Santo	Municipal	2011
Vale das Cascatas	5,880.00	Bahia	Municipal	1995

== Sources ==
- 12 anos de trabalho pela conservação da biodiversidade nacional (PDF) (in Portuguese), Brasília: MMA: Ministério do Meio Ambiente, 2015
- Atlantic Forest, CEPF: Critical Ecosystem Partnership Fund
- Corredores Ecológicos na Mata Atlântica (in Portuguese), RBMA: Reserva da Biosfera da Mata Atlântica
- Lamas, Ivana Reis; Crepaldi, Maria Otávia; Mesquita, Carlos Alberto Bernardo (2015), Uma Rede no Corredor (PDF) (in Portuguese), Conservação Internacional (CI-Brasil), ISBN 978-85-98830-28-5, archived from the original (PDF) on 2019-03-29
- Roberto Xavier de Lima (2006), O Corredor Central da Mata Atlântica (PDF), Brasilia: Ministério do Meio Ambiente, Conservação Internacional, Fundação SOS Mata Atlântica, archived from the original (PDF) on 2016-03-03
