= Itabira Natural Monument =

- Monumento Natural do Itabira
- IUCN category III (natural monument or feature)
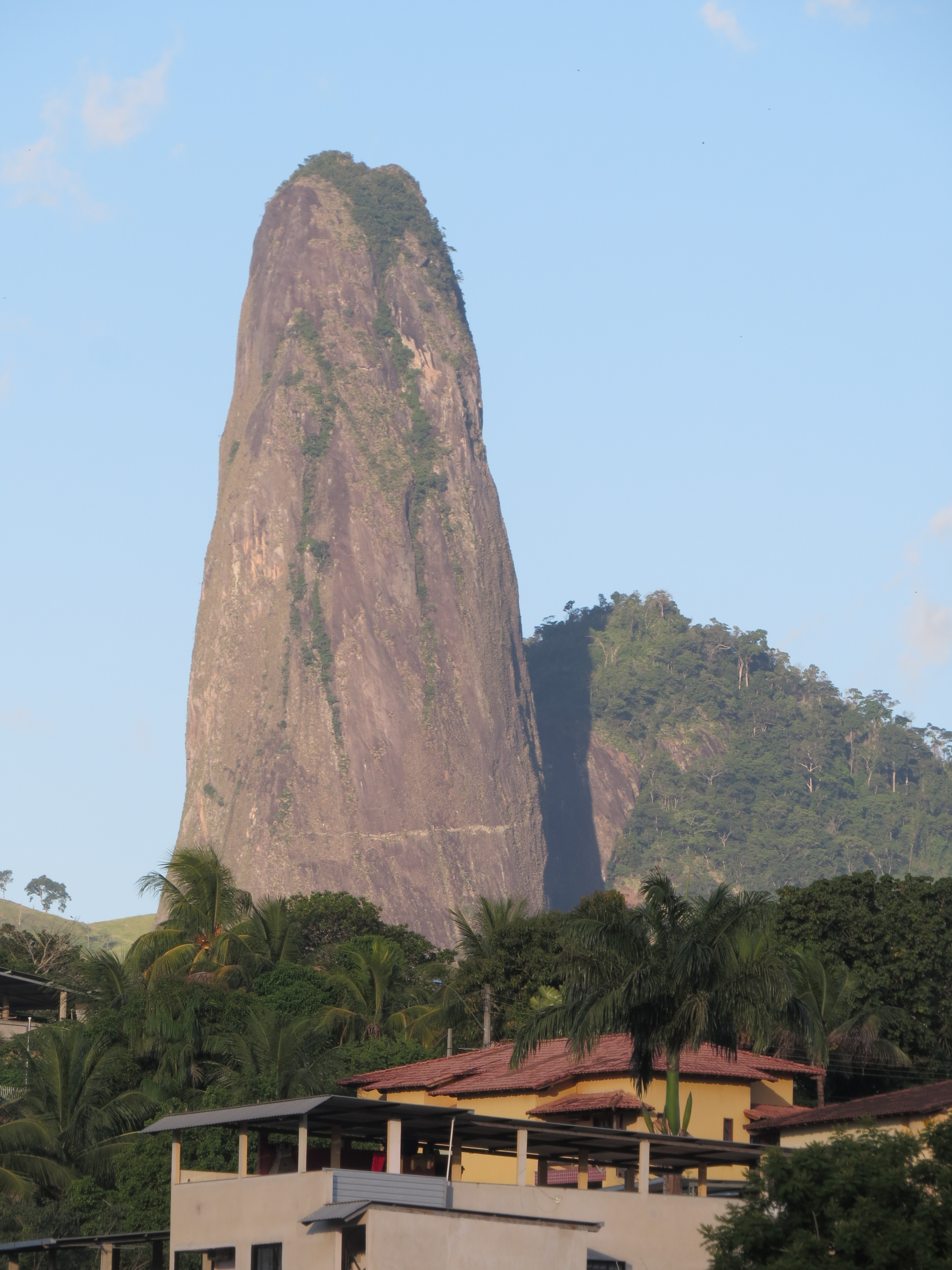
- Pedra do Itabira

- Location within Brazil
- Nearest city: Cachoeiro de Itapemirim, Espírito Santo
- Coordinates: 20.844558°S 41.064112°W
- Area: 452 hectares (1,120 acres)
- Designation: Natural monument
- Created: 1988

The Itabira Natural Monument (Portuguese: Monumento Natural do Itabira) is a Natural monument in the state of Espírito Santo, Brazil.

== Location ==
The Itabira Natural Monument is in the municipality of Cachoeiro de Itapemirim, Espírito Santo. It has an area of 452 hectares (1,120 acres). The monument is 6 kilometres (3.7 mi) from the municipal center. It includes the Pedra do Itabira, a striking vertical rock. The site includes overhanging rocks, fragments of Atlantic Forest and endangered birds such as the dusky-legged guan (Penelope obscura), Neotropical bellbird (genus Procnias), red-browed amazon (Amazona rhodocorytha) and saffron toucanet (Pteroglossus bailloni). It attracts tourists, mountain-bikers, hikers and mountaineers.

== History ==
The name "Itabira" is from the Tupi-Guarani language and means "steep rock". The stone was first climbed in 1947. The Itabira Sustainable Development Reserve was created by municipal decree 6159 of 25 August 1988 with an area of 104.75 hectares (258.8 acres). It became part of the Central Atlantic Forest Ecological Corridor, created in 2002. Municipal law 5774 of 3 October 2005 recategorized the reserve as the Itabira Natural Monument. In November 2014 the monument was enrolled in the National Register of Conservation Units (CNUC). This made it eligible to receive environmental compensation funds and assistance in management.

== Sources ==
- Cunha, Samara (April 2015), "Parque Natural Municipal do Itabira", Dia de Folga
- Lamas, Ivana Reis; Crepaldi, Maria Otávia; Mesquita, Carlos Alberto Bernardo (2015), Uma Rede no Corredor (PDF) (in Portuguese), Conservação Internacional (CI-Brasil), ISBN 978-85-98830-28-5, archived from the original (PDF) on 2019-03-29
- Official Record for Monumento Natural Do Itabira, Protected Planet
- Roza, Elton (19 November 2014), "Monumento Natural do Itabira agora integra o cadastro nacional de unidades de conservação", Folha (in Portuguese)
- Travaglia, Atilio (3 December 2008), Lei No 6177 (in Portuguese)
