= Pacotuba National Forest =

National forest in Espírito Santo, Brazil

- Floresta Nacional de Pacotuba
- IUCN category VI (protected area with sustainable use of natural resources)
- Location within Brazil
- Nearest city: Cachoeiro de Itapemirim, Espírito Santo
- Coordinates: 20°44′42″S 41°17′28″W
- Area: 450.59 hectares (1,113.4 acres)
- Designation: National forest
- Administrator: Chico Mendes Institute for Biodiversity Conservation

The Pacotuba National Forest (Portuguese: Floresta Nacional de Pacotuba) is a national forest in the state of Espírito Santo, Brazil.

== Location ==
The Pacotuba National Forest is in the municipality of Cachoeiro de Itapemirim. It has an area of about 450.59 hectares (1,113.4 acres) and a perimeter of 16.12 kilometres (10.02 mi). The buffer zone covers 15,825 hectares (39,100 acres). In the south the forest is bounded in part by the Itapemirim River and in part by the Bananal do Norte Experimental Farm. To the north, it is bounded by the quilombola community of Monte Alegre. It is in the Atlantic Forest biome. Vegetation is semi-deciduous seasonal forest.

The quilombola community of Monte Alegre offers ethnic, cultural, and environmental tourism in partnership with the forest and the Ministry of Tourism. This includes crafts and gastronomy, expression of traditions and community lifestyle, and guided tours of the forest.

== History ==
The Pacotuba National Forest was created by federal decree on 13 December 2002. The objective was to promote themanagement of natural resources by encouraging research with emphasis on the recovery of degraded areas and development of sustainable methods of exploiting non-timber natural resources. It became part of the Central Atlantic Forest Ecological Corridor, also created in 2002. The management plan was issued in June 2011.

== Sources ==
- Floresta Nacional de Pacotuba (in Portuguese), Via Rural, archived from the original on 2016-10-28
- Gonçalves, Augusta Rosa; Helmer, José Luiz (June 2011), Plano De Manejo Da Floresta Nacional De Pacotuba (PDF) (in Portuguese), vol. I–Diagnóstico, Vila Vilha: ICMBio, archived from the original (PDF) on 2016-03-03
- Lamas, Ivana Reis; Crepaldi, Maria Otávia; Mesquita, Carlos Alberto Bernardo (2015), Uma Rede no Corredor (PDF) (in Portuguese), Conservação Internacional (CI-Brasil), ISBN 978-85-98830-28-5
