= Pontões Capixabas Natural Monument =

- Monumento Natural dos Pontões Capixabas
- IUCN category III (natural monument or feature)
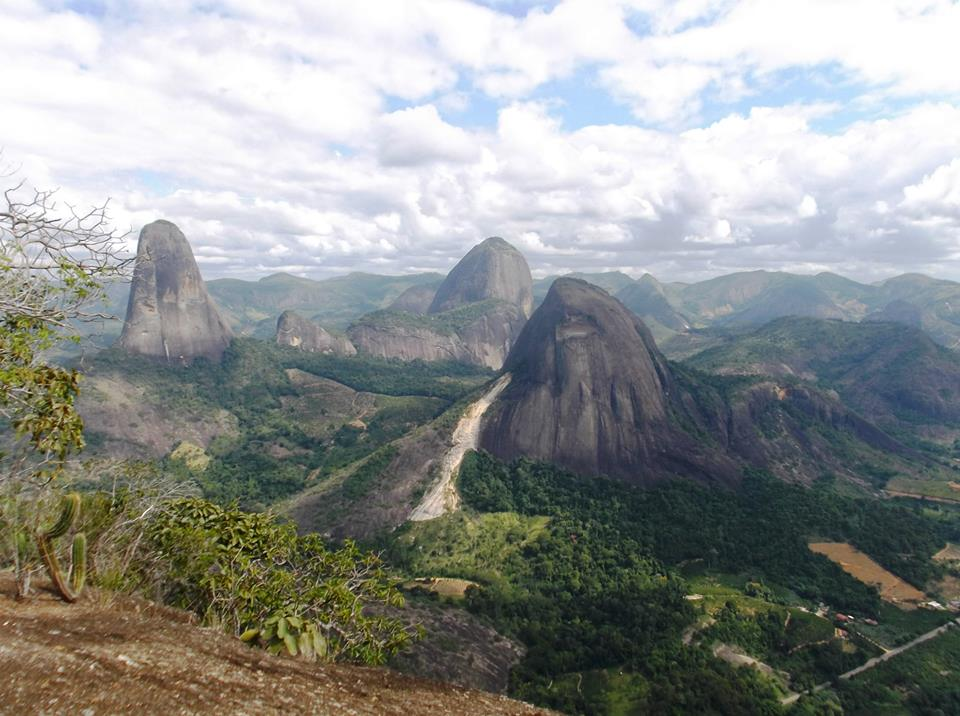
- View from the Pedra do Camelo

- Location within Brazil
- Nearest city: Colatina, Espírito Santo
- Coordinates: 19°13′37″S 40°47′53″W
- Designation: Natural monument
- Administrator: ICMBio

Pontões Capixabas Natural Monument (Portuguese: Monumento Natural dos Pontões Capixabas) is a natural monument in the state of Espírito Santo, Brazil.

== Location ==
The Pontões Capixabas Natural Monument lies in the Atlantic Forest biome. It covers 17,443 hectares (43,100 acres). It is in the municipalities of Águia Branca and Pancas in the state of Espírito Santo.

The terrain includes the escarpment of the Serra da Mantiqueira and part of the Jequitinhonha-Pardo plateau. The streams are in the watershed of the Pancas River, a tributary of the Doce River. Average annual rainfall is 1,250 millimetres (49 in). Average temperature is 24 °C (75 °F). Altitudes range from 120 to 1,000 metres (390 to 3,280 ft). The conservation unit holds a remnant of dense rainforest.

== History ==
It was created as a national park by decree on 19 December 2002. It became part of the Central Atlantic Forest Ecological Corridor, created in 2002. Law 11.686 of 2 June 2008 changed the designation of the Pontões Capixabas National Park to the Pontões Capixabas Natural Monument. The unit is administered by the Chico Mendes Institute for Biodiversity Conservation. The conservation unit is classed as IUCN protected area category III (natural monument or feature). The primary objective is to preserve the rocky features, the associated flora and fauna, and the landscape. The cougar (Puma concolor) is a protected species in the unit.

== Sources ==
- Lamas, Ivana Reis; Crepaldi, Maria Otávia; Mesquita, Carlos Alberto Bernardo (2015), Uma Rede no Corredor (PDF) (in Portuguese), Conservação Internacional (CI-Brasil), ISBN 978-85-98830-28-5
- Monumento Natural dos Pontões Capixabas (in Portuguese), Chico Mendes Institute for Biodiversity Conservation
- Unidade de Conservação: Monumento Natural dos Pontões Capixabas (in Portuguese), MMA: Ministério do Meio Ambiente
