= Morro do Penedo Natural Monument =

- Monumento Natural Municipal Morro do Penedo
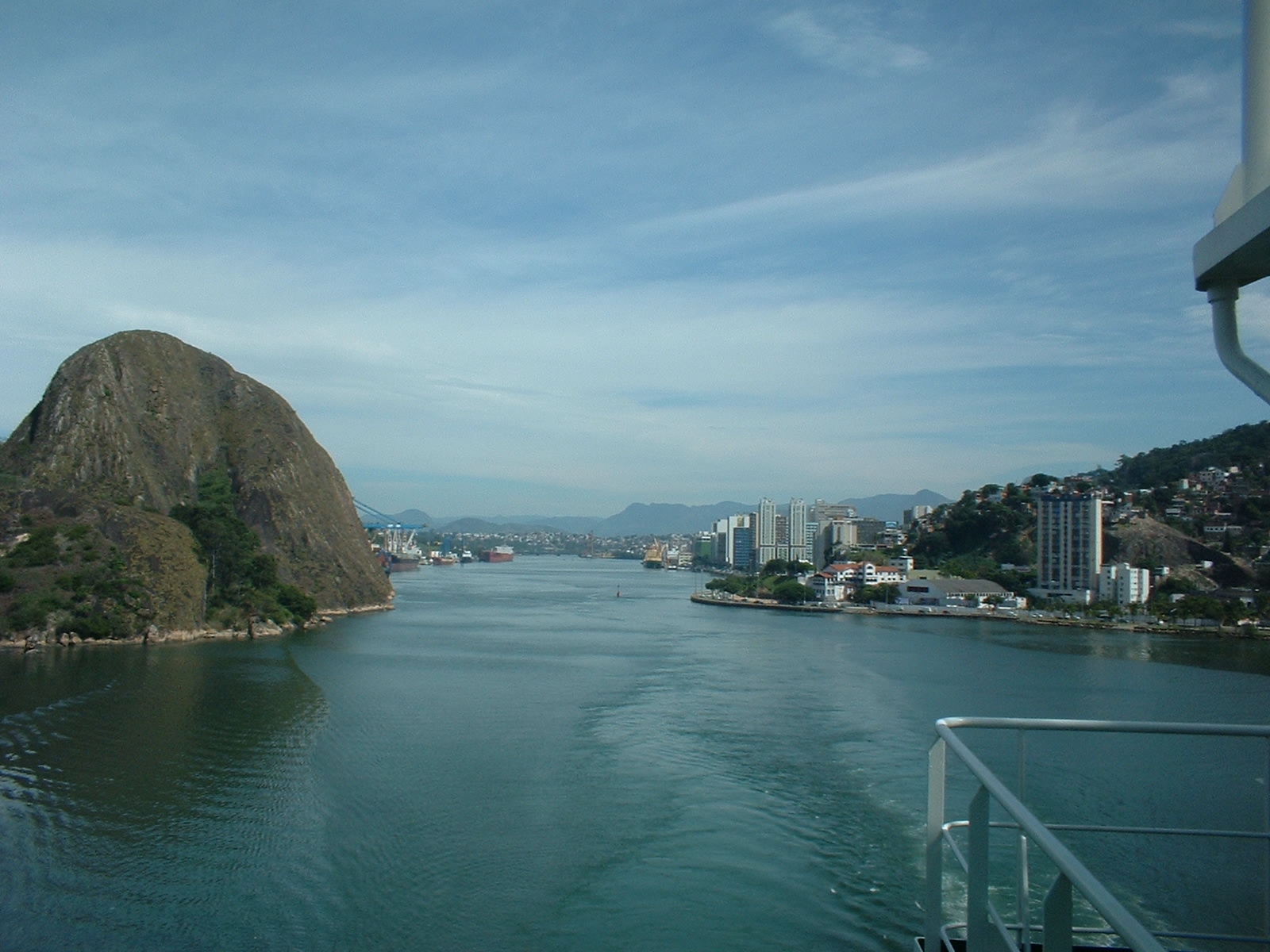
- Vitória Bay, Morro do Penedo to the left

- Location within Brazil
- Nearest city: Vila Velha, Espírito Santo
- Coordinates: 20°19′26″S 40°19′30″W
- Area: 18.79 hectares (46.4 acres)
- Designation: Natural monument
- Created: 2010

The Morro do Penedo Natural Monument (Portuguese: Monumento Natural Municipal Morro do Penedo) is a municipal natural monument in the state of Espírito Santo, Brazil. It contains a small sugarloaf hill on the shore of the bay to the south of Vitória, the state capital.

== Location ==
The Morro do Penedo Natural Monument is in the municipality of Vila Velha, Espírito Santo. It has an area of 18.89 hectares (46.7 acres). It is a granite rock mass around 132 metres (433 ft) high on the coast of the Vitória Bay channel at the mouth of the Aribiri River. There are remnants of Atlantic Forest vegetation.

== History ==
The Morro do Penedo Natural Monument was created by municipal decree 091/07 and regulated by law 4.930 of 2010. It became part of the Central Atlantic Forest Ecological Corridor, created in 2002. A project to implement a park in the natural monument was detailed in 2012, including a visitor center, gazebo, suspended forest walkways, a pier and a floating dock. An access tower between the Morro da Urca and Morro do Penedo was also planned, a rainwater collection system, and restoration of a stone house as a museum. In July 2015 a steel cable used to climb the hill was removed for safety reasons. City officials said another, safer climbing route would be made.

== Sources ==
- "Cabo usado para escalar Morro do Penedo, ES, é retirado", G1 Globo (in Portuguese)
- Desenvolvimento Sustentável - Projeto Parque do Penedo (in Portuguese), Prefeitura de Vila Velha
- Faria, Willis de (10 November 2012), "Penedo: um Monumento Natural no Estreito da Baia de Vitória", De Olho na Ilha (in Portuguese)
- "Morro do Penedo poderá se tornar parque para visitação", Folha Vitória (in Portuguese), 5 May 2013
- Lamas, Ivana Reis; Crepaldi, Maria Otávia; Mesquita, Carlos Alberto Bernardo (2015), Uma Rede no Corredor (PDF) (in Portuguese), Conservação Internacional (CI-Brasil), ISBN 978-85-98830-28-5
