= Itapemirim Transportes Aéreos (2020–2022) =

Brazilian airline

IATA	ICAO	Call sign
8I	IPM	AEROITA
- Founded: 2020
- Commenced operations: 29 June 2021; 5 years ago
- Ceased operations: 5 May 2022; 4 years ago
- Hubs: São Paulo/Guarulhos International Airport
- Focus cities: Rio de Janeiro/Galeão International Airport
- Frequent-flyer program: ITA Clube
- Parent company: Itapemirim (2020-2021)
- Headquarters: São Paulo, Brazil
- Key people: Adalberto Bogsan (CEO)
- Website: www.voeita.com.br

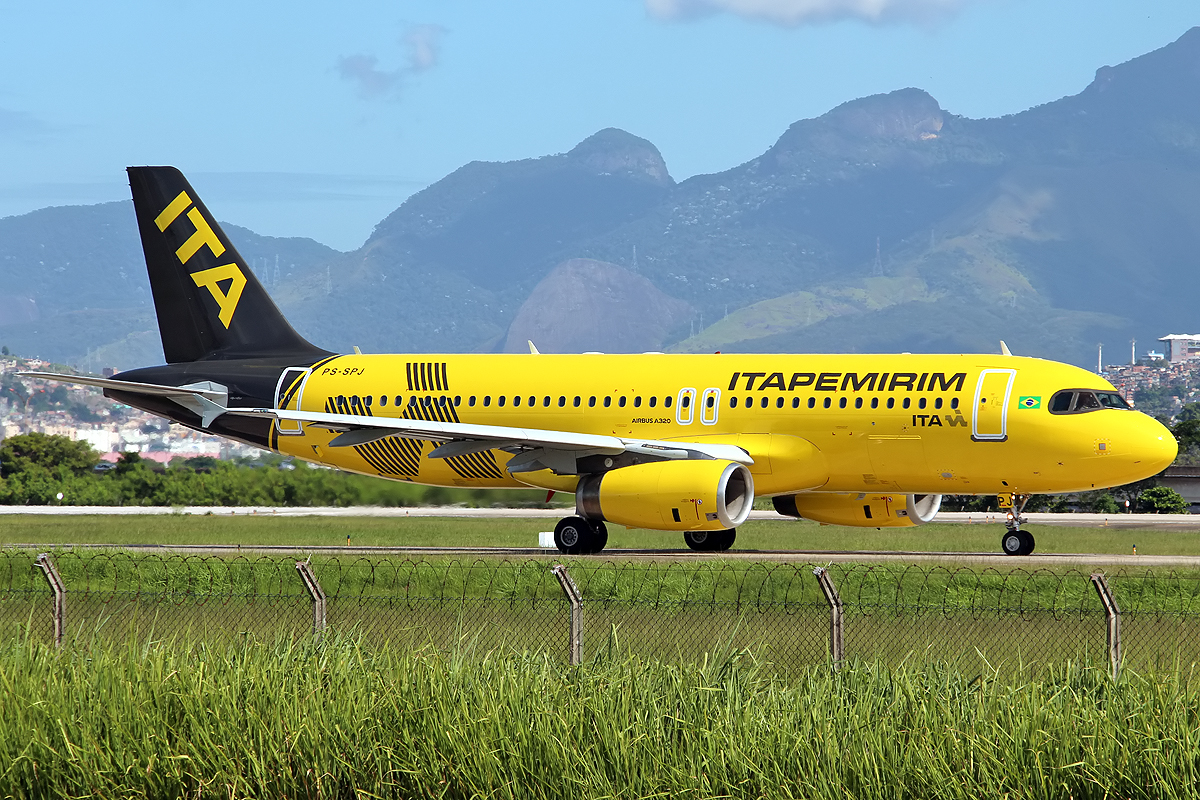
A former ITA Airbus A320-200 taxiing at Rio de Janeiro/Galeão International Airport in 2021

Itapemirim Transportes Aéreos Ltda. (also known as ITA or Itapemirim) was a Brazilian airline established in 2020 and belonged to the Itapemirim Group. On 17 December 2021, the airline suspended all operations for internal restructuring. In March 2022, it was announced that the Baufaker Consulting firm bought the company, after which the owner, Galeb Baufaker Junior, defended the termination of the contract. ITA had its Air operator's certificate permanently revoked on May 5, 2022.

== History ==
This was the second time that Itapemirim Group has operated in the aviation sector. The first time was with Itapemirim Transportes Aéreos, which operated between 1991 and 2000. It had a cargo division, Itapemirim Cargo, which owned 6 Boeing 727s. It flew from Viracopos to Manaus and it also operated on the Campinas-Galeão-Recife-Fortaleza route. The other division was Itapemirim Regional, which operated flights between São Paulo and Rio de Janeiro with two Cessna 208 Caravans, between 1997 and 1998. It operated until the year 2000, when, without any aircraft, its air operator's certificate was revoked by the defunct Department of Civil Aviation.

=== Purchase attempts ===
On 3 July 2017, Itapemirim Group announced the purchase of Passaredo Linhas Aéreas. For two months, the airline management was shared between the former owners and Itapemirim Group. There was also a sharing of the airline's routes with the Viação Itapemirim bus routes. Counting the bus lines and the 20 cities where Passaredo operated, the integration between the aerial and road networks reached up to 2,500 Brazilian cities. The purchase was later undone by Passaredo. According to them, the reason was the Itapemirim Group did not comply with the agreement established.

On 14 September 2020, Itapemirim Group purchased América do Sul Táxi Aéreo, sister company of ASTA Linhas Aéreas. ASTA confirmed that Itapemirim bought the sister company, without its Cessnas, which were left with ASTA. Later, Itapemirim Group confirmed the purchase and the change of the company's name to ITA Transportes Aéreos. The purchase of this company served to facilitate and streamline the certification processes of ITA, using the certificate of an existing air taxi company.

=== AOC process and first flight ===
During the month of April 2021, ITA's first A320 made a series of test flights in order to obtain the airline certification, leaving Guarulhos airport and going to Belo Horizonte (Confins), Salvador, Porto Alegre and Rio de Janeiro (Galeão). On 28 April 2021, the company was approved in the last phase of the National Civil Aviation Agency of Brazil (ANAC) assessments and on April 30, 2021, the Air Operator Certificate (AOC) was issued. On 20 May 2021, The agency issued the concession grant for operating regular and non-regular public air transport services in Brazil.

Ticket sales started on 21 May 2021. The company's inaugural flight was on June 29, 2021 (IPM-0001, from São Paulo-Guarulhos to Brasília) for guests only. Commercial flights started on June 30, 2021.

On 31 May 2021, Itapemirim Group announced that ITA's former CEO, Tiago Senna, who had been in charge since the company's creation, was promoted to the position of Vice President of New Business at the Itapemirim Group, with the mission of strengthening the group's new multimodal ventures. He was replaced by Adalberto Bogsan, former CEO of ASTA Linhas Aéreas.

=== Suspension and rebrand attempt ===
On 17 December 2021, ITA Transportes Aéreos ceased operations for internal restructuring. Hours after the announcement, the Aviation Agency of Brazil suspended its air operator's certificate.

As of February 2022, the company was in advanced talking with two American private equity funds, by the agreement, the funds would assume the airline's debts but they want to offset its current President, Sidnei Piva de Jesus, from the company's management, making it an independent airline, reports said.

The newspaper O Globo had access to exclusive material showing that the company had ANAC's approval despite a social capital of R$380,000 (US$67,942), insufficient for aviation operations, according to specialists. For comparison, Azul Linhas Aéreas started with a social capital of R$80 million (2008) (US$43.63 million), currently the company has a social capital of R$4.6 billion (US$822.46 million).

In March 2022, the company announced that the Brazilian Baufaker Consulting firm acquired the company's debt of about R$180 million (US$32.18 million) and would return R$30 million (US$5.36 million) wrongly taken from Itapemirim.

According to public information, the company Baufaker Consulting Finances e Representações Comerciais is headquartered in Taguatinga, Federal District, has a share capital of R$100,000 (US$17,879) and has no experience in civil aviation, the company declares to the Federal Revenue of Brazil that it operates in areas such as printing security materials, credit cards administration, retail, real estate, among others.

In May 2022, Galeb Baufaker Junior, who had shown interest in purchasing the company, gave up the deal. The Judicial Recovery documentation points to legal uncertainties regarding Viação Itapemirim and Sidnei Piva, who got an freezing order by the Court of Justice of São Paulo, on 18 April. Galeb left a far open window to renegotiate the asset after an upcoming meeting of creditors.

On May 5, 2022, ITA had its air operator's certificate permanently revoked, and on September 21, 2022 it declared for bankruptcy.

== Destinations ==
In December 2021, prior to the suspension of its services, ITA operated scheduled services to the following destinations:

Hub
Focus City

City	Airport	Refs
Belo Horizonte	Tancredo Neves International Airport	
Brasília	Presidente Juscelino Kubitschek International Airport	
Curitiba	Afonso Pena International Airport	
Florianópolis	Hercílio Luz International Airport	
Fortaleza	Pinto Martins International Airport	
Foz do Iguaçu	Cataratas International Airport	
Maceió	Zumbi dos Palmares International Airport	
Natal	Governador Aluízio Alves International Airport	
Porto Alegre	Salgado Filho International Airport	
Porto Seguro	Porto Seguro Airport	
Recife	Guararapes–Gilberto Freyre International Airport	
Rio de Janeiro	Galeão–Antonio Carlos Jobim International Airport	
Salvador da Bahia	Deputado Luís Eduardo Magalhães International Airport	
São Paulo	Congonhas–Deputado Freitas Nobre Airport	
São Paulo	Guarulhos–Governor André Franco Montoro International Airport	

== Fleet ==
Itapemirim Transportes Aéreos fleet
Aircraft	Total	Operation	Notes
Airbus A319-100	1	–	Leased from Hi Fly Malta, never entered into Itapemirim service; returned to Europe.
Airbus A320-200	6	2021	All returned to bank lessors in the US

== See also ==
- Greyhound Air
- List of defunct airlines of Brazil
