= Frade e a Freira Natural Monument =

- Monumento Natural O Frade e a Freira
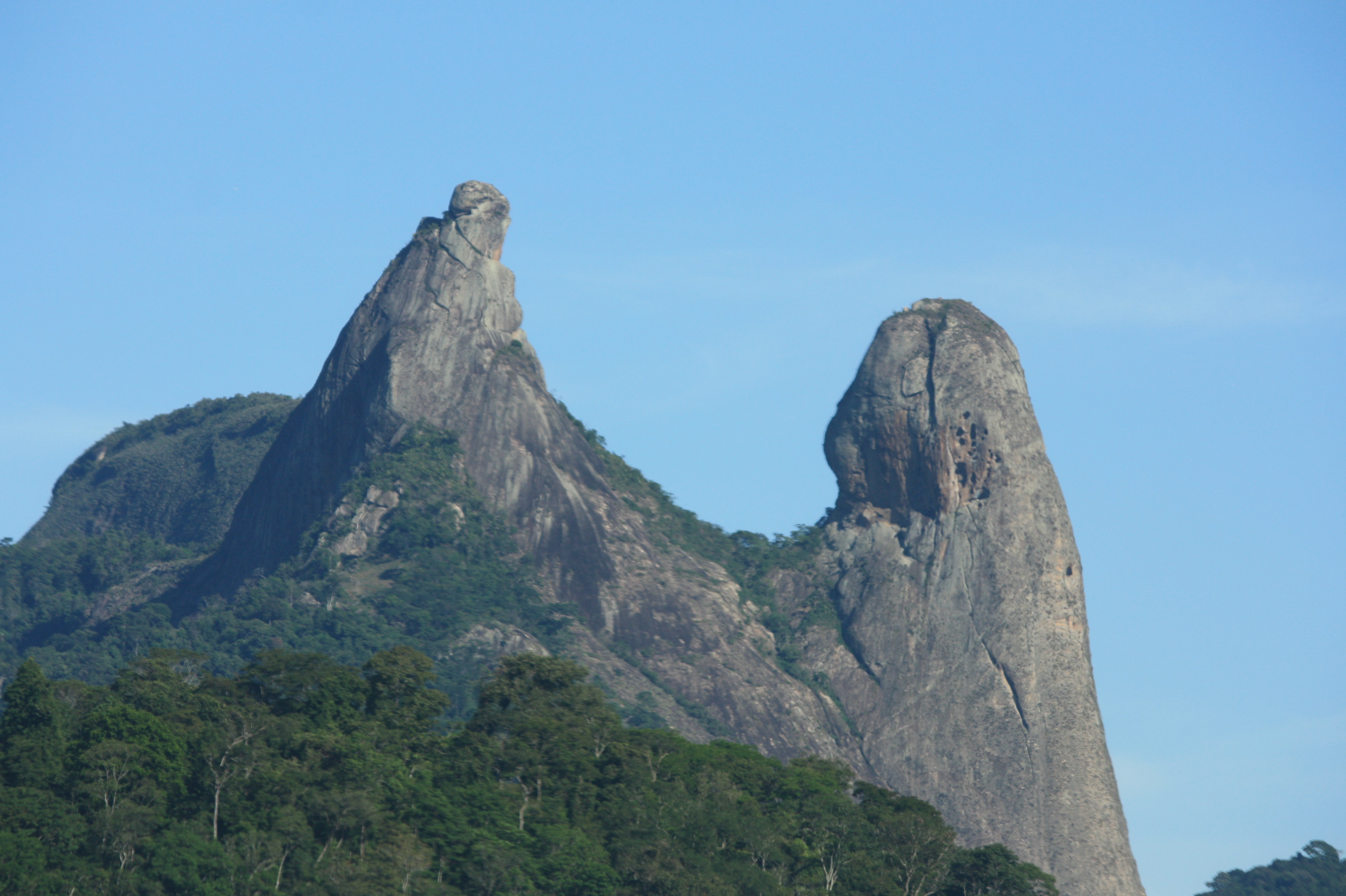
- Pedra O Frade e a Freira May 2014

- Location within Brazil
- Nearest city: Cachoeiro de Itapemirim, Espírito Santo
- Coordinates: 20.8686°S 40.9938°W
- Designation: Natural monument

Frade e a Freira Natural Monument (Portuguese: Monumento Natural O Frade e a Freira) is a natural monument in the state of Espírito Santo, Brazil.

== Location ==
The Frade e a Freira (Friar and Nun) is an unusual rock formation located in the south of the state of Espírito Santo. The protected area includes about 861 hectares (2,130 acres) and contains characteristic fragments of Atlantic Forest. It covers parts of the municipalities of Cachoeiro de Itapemirim, Itapemirim and Vargem Alta. It lies to the north of the road between Cachoeiro de Itapemirim and Rio Novo do Sul. The rock is 683 metres (2,241 ft) in altitude, and may be climbed by visitors.

== History ==
On 12 June 1986 the formation was given a Natural Cultural Heritage designation by the state, and on 6 September 2007 it was made a Natural Monument by state decree 1917-R. It became part of the Central Atlantic Forest Ecological Corridor, created in 2002. As of 2012 there was no evidence of any state effort to protect the monument, such as a gatehouse or guides. In 2015 it was found that 150 native trees had been cut down near the monument and the profitable parts removed. It was not clear whether they were within the protected area.

== Name ==
The name comes from a legend that a monk and a nun, who were working together in an attempt to convert the Indians to Christianity, fell in love with each other. They were forbidden to consummate their love by the church and by their own beliefs, although their feelings became deeper every day. For their sacrifice God transformed their passion into stone, where it is immortalized and admired by everyone who passes through the region.

== Sources ==
- "Crime ambiental no entorno do Frade e a Freira", Jornal Fatos & Notícias (in Portuguese), 30 March 2015
- Lamas, Ivana Reis; Crepaldi, Maria Otávia; Mesquita, Carlos Alberto Bernardo (2015), Uma Rede no Corredor (PDF) (in Portuguese), Conservação Internacional (CI-Brasil), ISBN 978-85-98830-28-5, archived from the original (PDF) on 2019-03-29
- "Monumento Natural O Frade e a Freira", Google Maps
- Monumento Natural O Frade e a Freira (in Portuguese), Secretário de Meio Ambiente, Espírito Santo, archived from the original on 2016-06-03
- "O frade e a freira: Uma história de amor impossível no Sul do ES", Viagem Massa (in Portuguese), 15 September 2012
- Rafael Santiago (September 2012), "Monumento Natural O Frade e a Freira", mochileiros.com (in Portuguese)
