= Pedra do Elefante Natural Monument =

Municipal Natural monument in the state of Rio de Janeiro, Brazil

- Monumento Natural da Pedra do Elefante
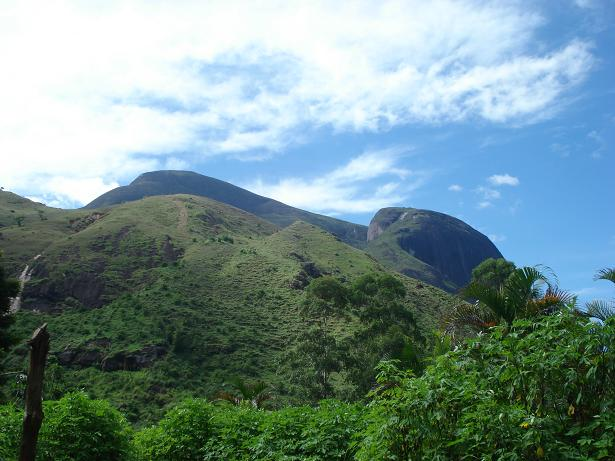
- Pedra do Elefante

- Location within Brazil
- Nearest city: Petrópolis, Rio de Janeiro
- Coordinates: 22°19′58″S 43°04′41″W
- Area: 530 hectares (1,300 acres)
- Designation: Natural monument
- Created: May 2010
- Administrator: Secretaria de Meio Ambiente e Desenvolvimento Sustentável

The Pedra do Elefante Natural Monument (Portuguese: Monumento Natural da Pedra do Elefante) is a municipal Natural monument in the state of Rio de Janeiro, Brazil.

== Location ==
The Pedra do Elefante Natural Monument is in the municipality of Petrópolis, Rio de Janeiro. It has an area of about 530 hectares (1,300 acres). The monument is an imposing granite mountain in the Serra de Petrópolis. It is in the Posse district of the Taquaril Bairro. It is located on the Taquaril road.

The rock, also known as Jacuba Menor, rises to an elevation of 1,380 metres (4,530 ft). The rock face is about 500 metres (1,600 ft) high, and has thousands of boulders at its base. It provides challenging routes for climbers, who may reach the base via well maintained trails from the Abrigo do Elefante site at Kilometer 2 on the Taquaril road. Hazards include loose stones, hawks, swallows, snakes, racoons and, according to legend, an ocelot. The site in 2013 was suffering from deforestation and use of pesticides by local landowners.

== History ==
The Pedra do Elefante Natural Monument was created by municipal decree in May 2010. The board was to consist of ten government representatives and ten representatives of civil society. It is classed as a fully protected conservation unit. It is administered by the municipal Secretariat of Environment and Sustainable Development. It was included in the Central Rio de Janeiro Atlantic Forest Mosaic, which had been created in December 2006.

In 2011 it was proposed to develop a master plan for the municipality of Petrópolis for adaptation to climate change. This would support reforestation of 250 hectares (620 acres) around the monument by 2016, and 1,000 hectares (2,500 acres) by 2020. The civil society members of the board were elected in 2013 as a step towards creating a management plan, required in order to get federal funding.

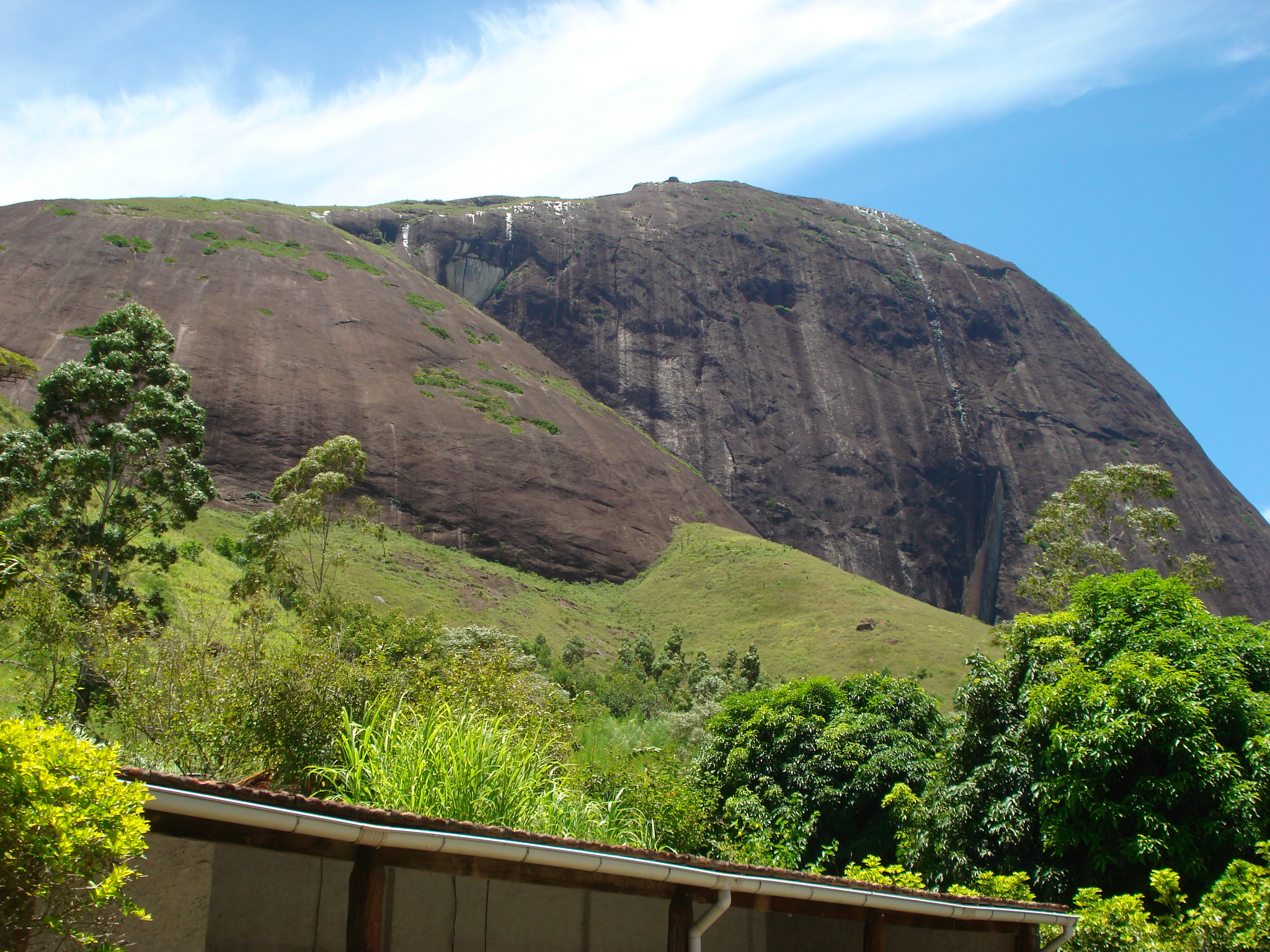
Close-up of the rock

== Sources ==
- Costa, Cláudia; Lamas, Ivana; Fernandes, Rosan (December 2010), Planejamento Estratégico do Mosaico Central Fluminense (PDF) (in Portuguese), Reserva da Biosfera da Mata Atlântica, archived from the original (PDF) on 2016-10-07
- Dados do Concedente 021053/2011 (in Portuguese), Ministerio de Justica
- "Pedra do Elefante", Ser de Rocha (in Portuguese)
- "Setor 8 – Taquaril", Guia de Escaladas de Petrópolis (in Portuguese)
- Unidades de Conservação da Natureza no Município de Petrópolis (in Portuguese), Município de Petrópolis, archived from the original on 2023-03-30
- Wilbert, Marianne Ramos (16 September 2013). "Conselho da Pedra do Elefante terá nova eleição nesta semana". Revista On. Archived from the original on 6 February 2017.
