= Marataízes =

- Municipality
- Municipality of Marataízes
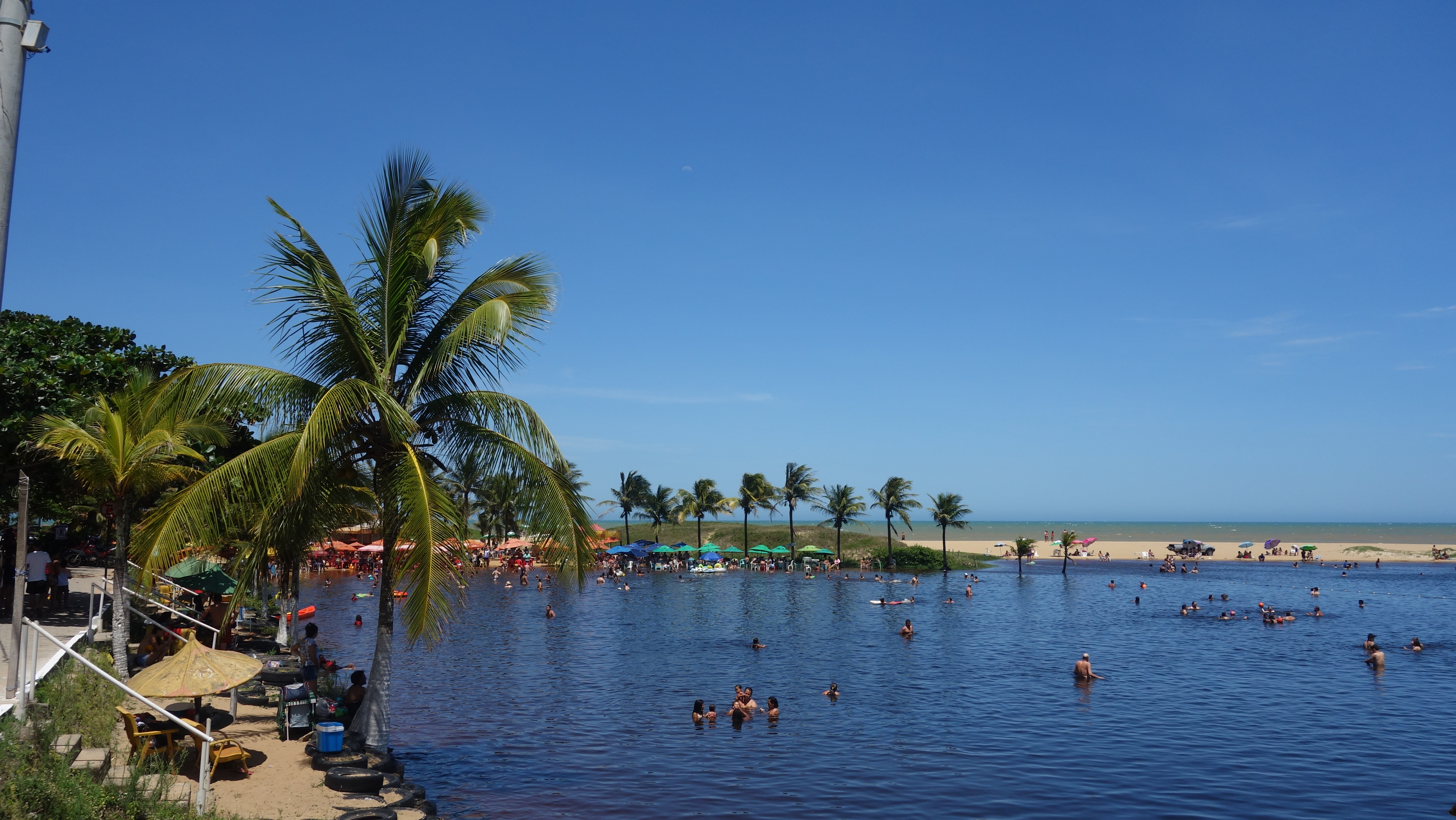

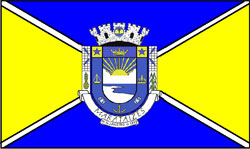
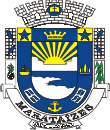
- Flag Coat of arms
- Nickname: Pérola do Sul (Pearl of the South)
- Location in the state of Espírito Santo

- Location within Brazil
- Coordinates: 21°45′14″S 41°19′26″W
- Country: Brazil
- Region: Southeast
- State: Espírito Santo
- Founded: 14 January 1992

Government
  - Mayor: Jander Nunes Vidal (PSDB)

Area
  - Total: 133.075 km^{2} (51.381 sq mi)
- Elevation: 2 m (6.6 ft)

Population (2020)
  - Total: 38,883
  - Density: 292.19/km^{2} (756.77/sq mi)
- Time zone: UTC−3 (BRT)
- Postal Code: 29345-000
- Area code: +55 28
- HDI (2010): 0.696 – medium
- Website: marataizes.es.gov.br

Marataízes is a municipality located by the Atlantic Ocean in southern Espírito Santo, Brazil. It has a population of 38,883 and holds as such the highest density in the state. Marataízes is a tourist city.

The municipality contains the 42.20 hectares (104.3 acres) Falésias de Marataízes Natural Monument, created in 2008 to protect the cliffs to the south of the town.

== Gallery ==
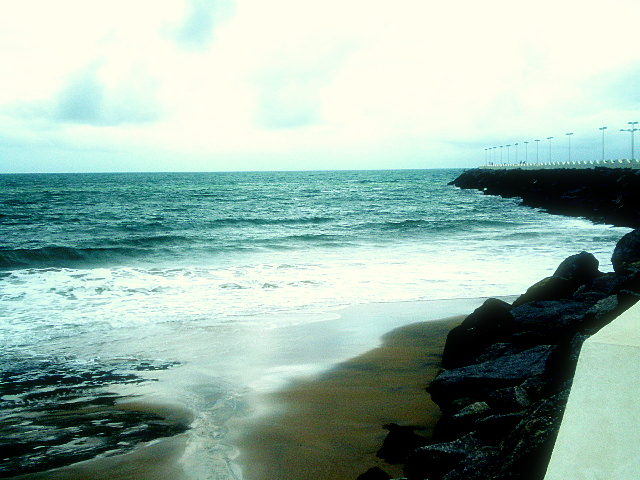

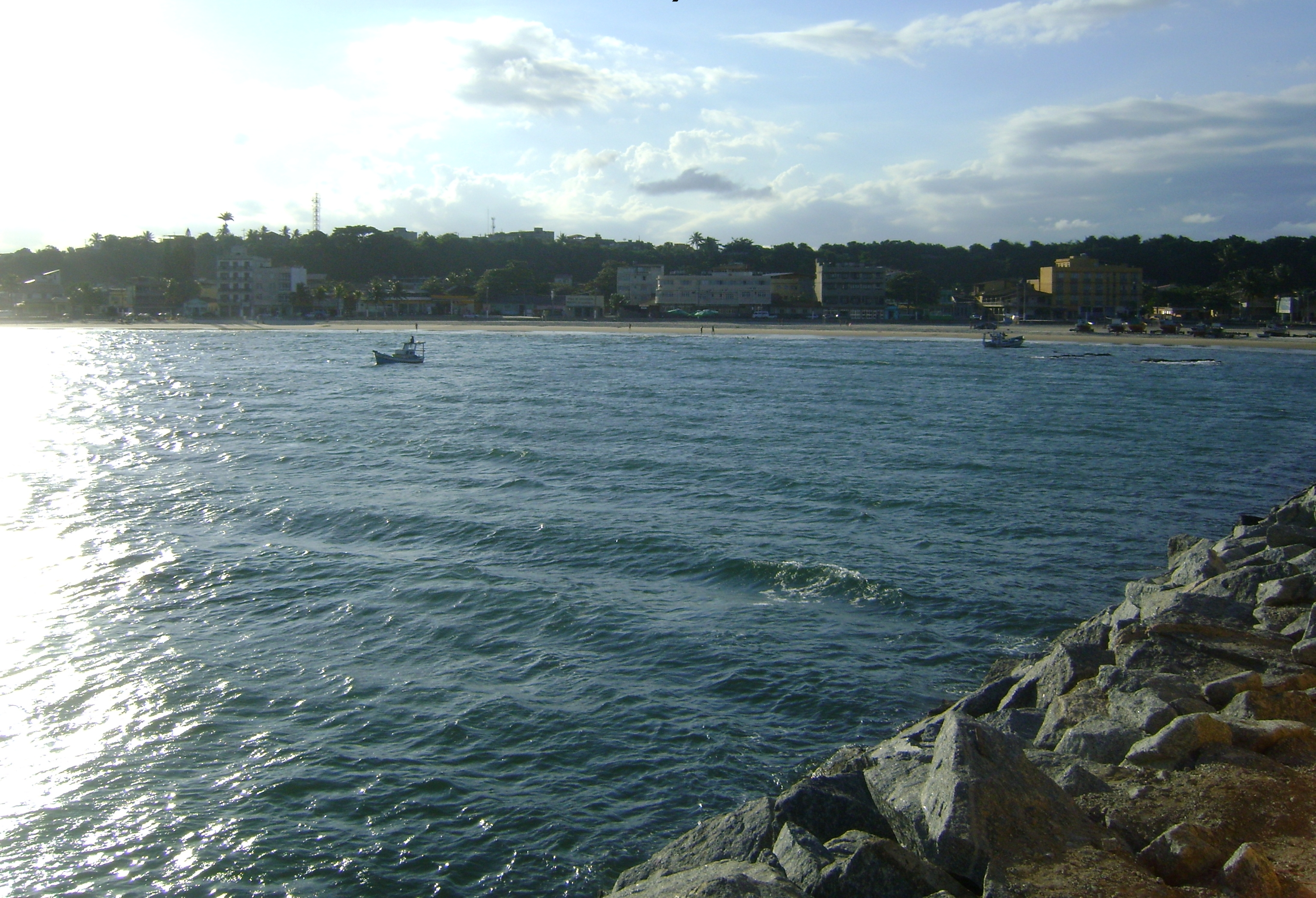
A beach in Marataizes

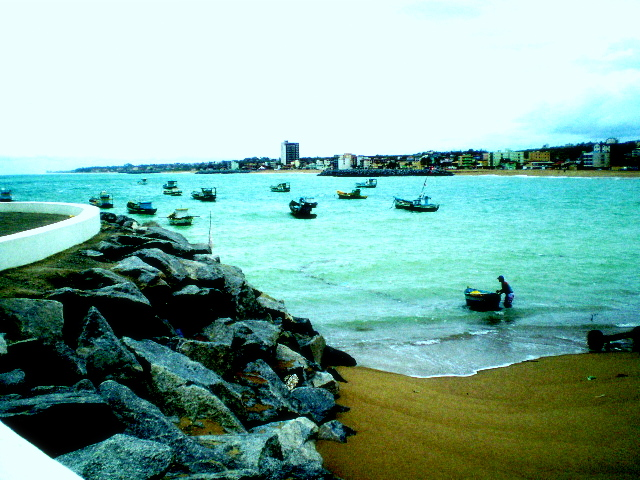
Fishing boats

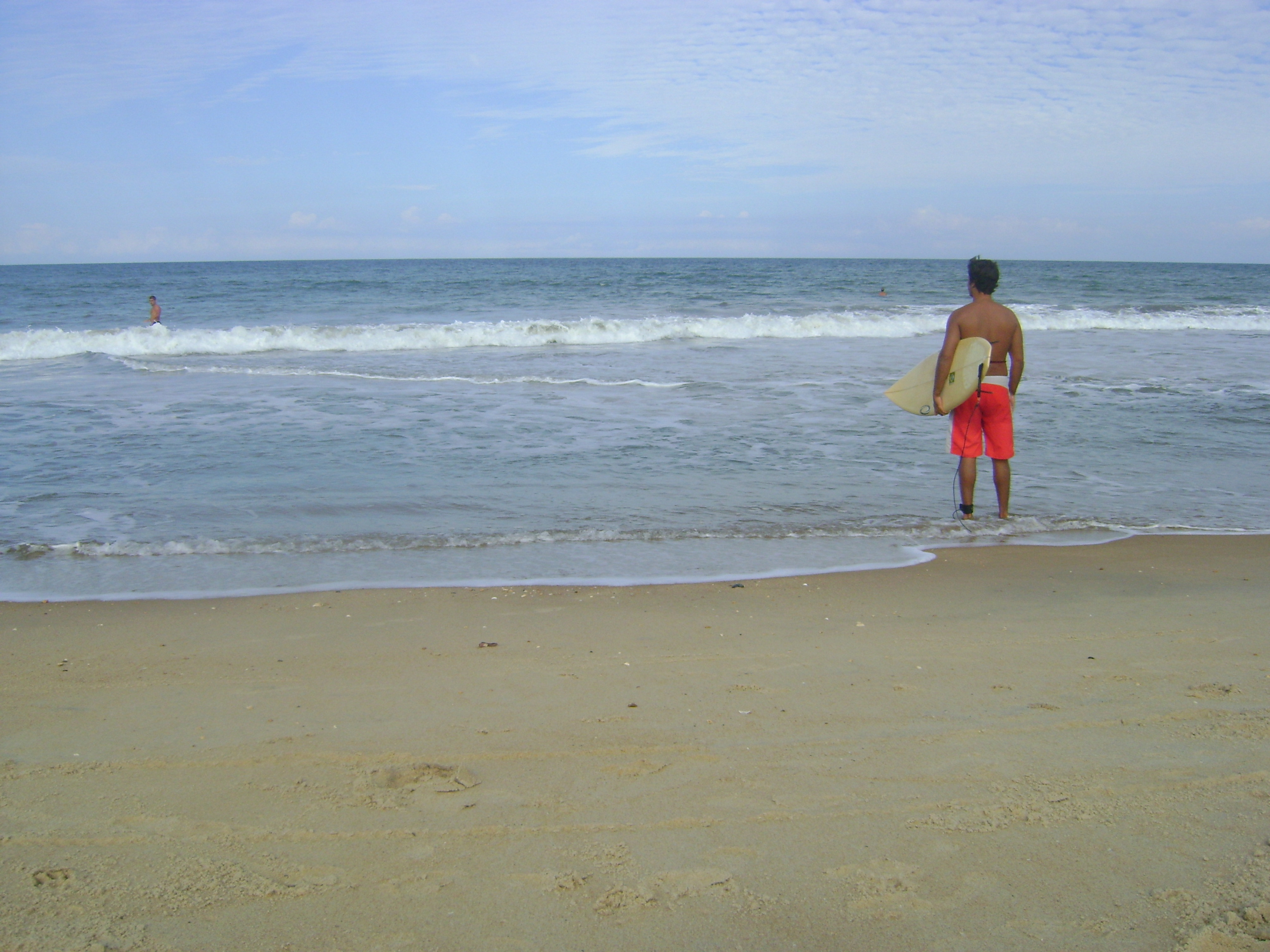
Surfer in a local beach

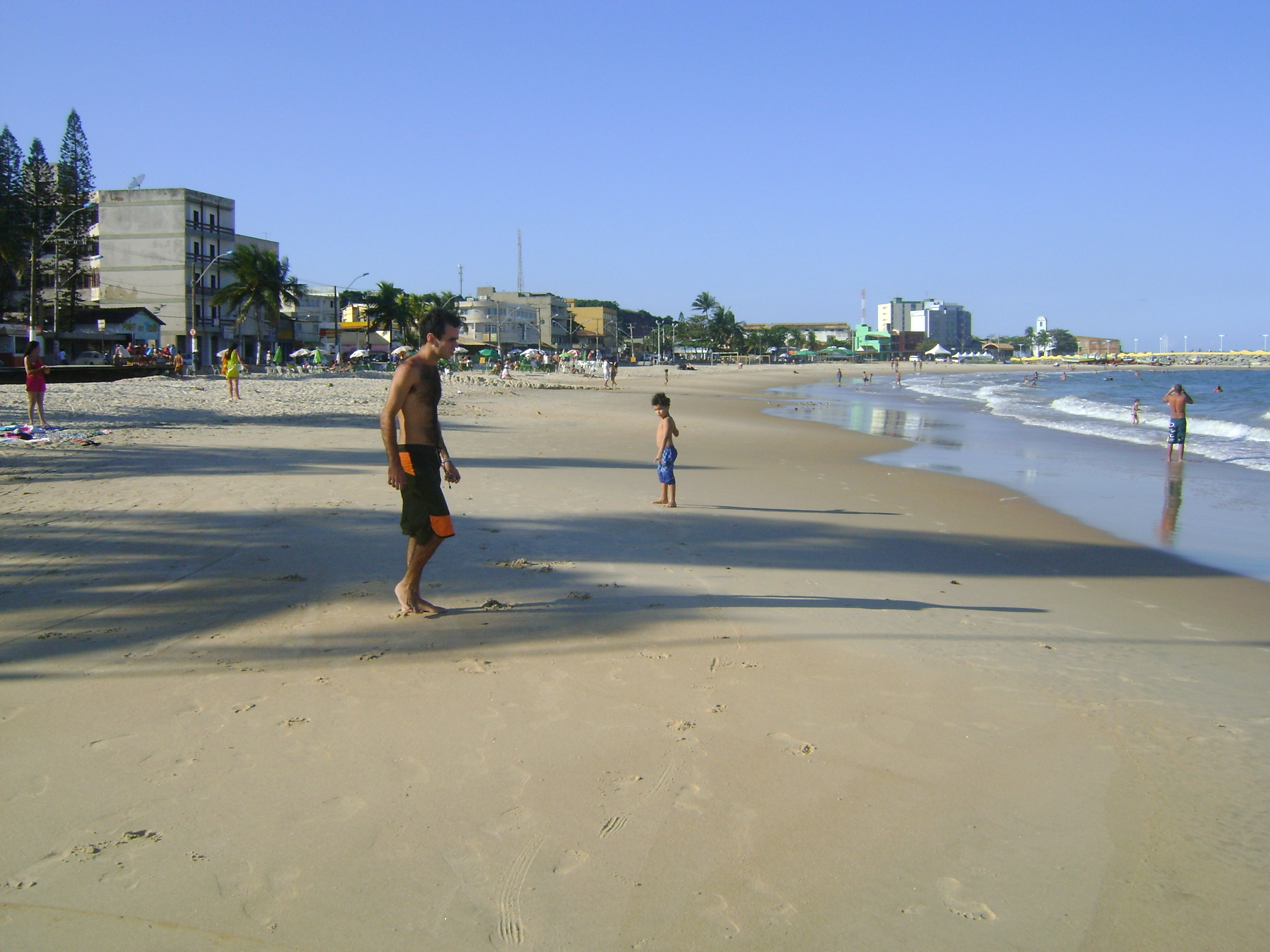
Main beach

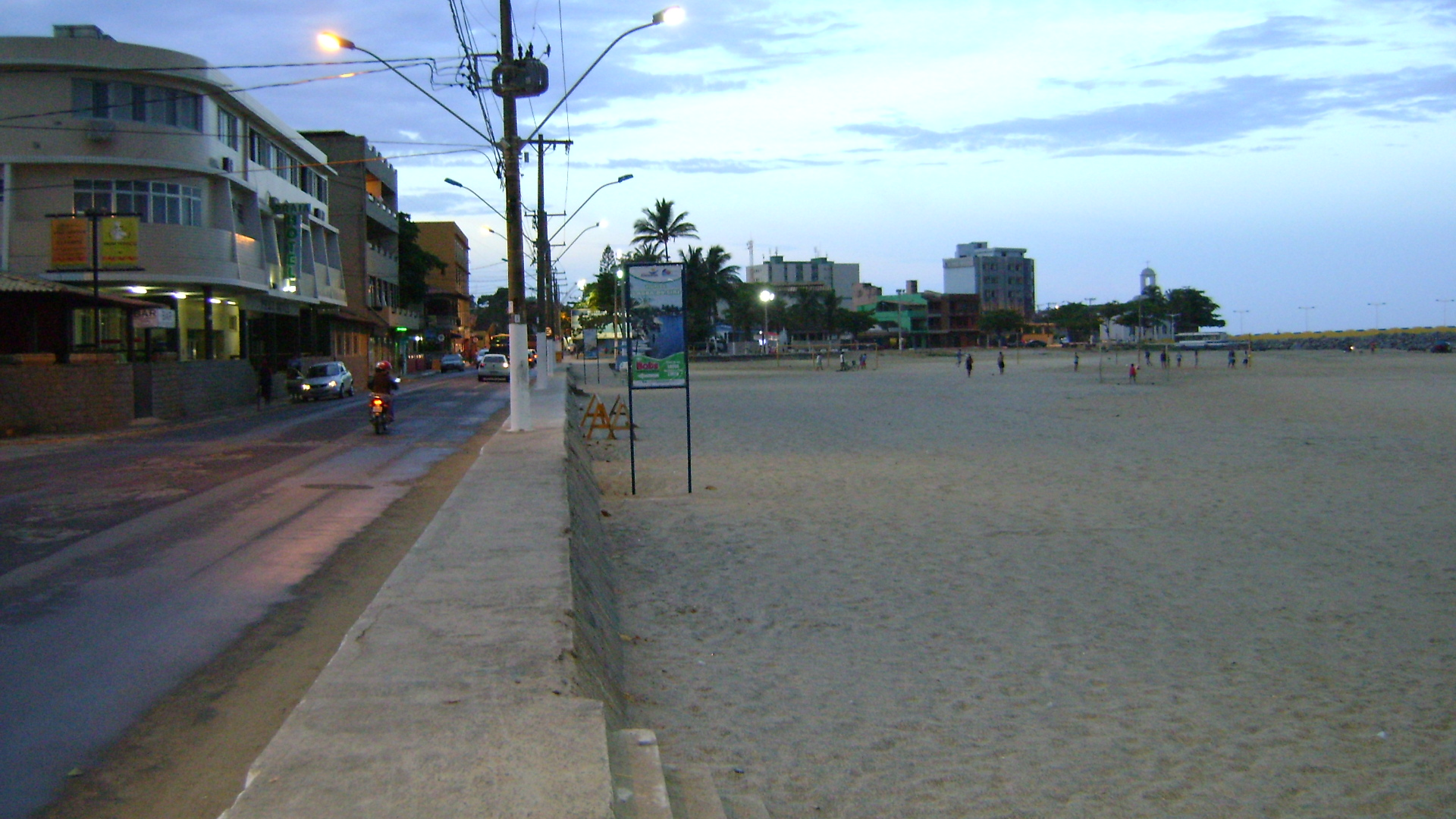
Ending day after rain
