= Falésias de Marataízes Natural Monument =

Municipal Natural monument in Brazil

- Monumento Natural Municipal Falésias de Marataízes
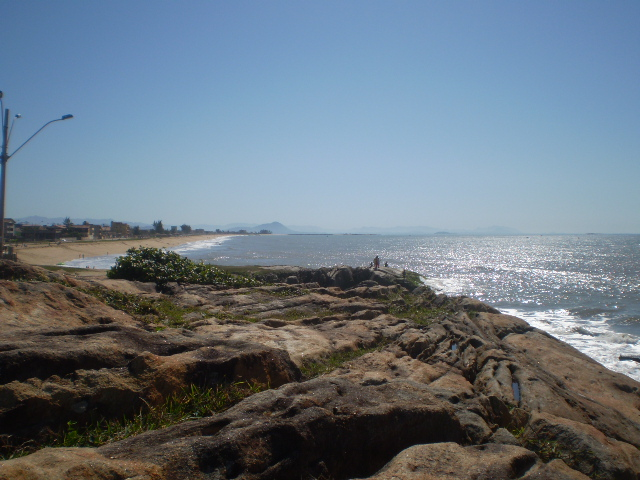
- Clifftop to the south of the town

- Location within Brazil
- Nearest city: Marataízes, Espírito Santo
- Coordinates: 21.137546°S 40.874465°W
- Area: 42.20 hectares (104.3 acres)
- Designation: Natural monument
- Created: 1 December 2008
- Administrator: Secretaria Municipal de Meio Ambiente de Marataízes

The Falésias de Marataízes Natural Monument Portuguese: Monumento Natural Municipal Falésias de Marataízes) is a municipal Natural monument in the state of Espírito Santo, Brazil.

== Location ==
The Falésias de Marataízes Natural Monument is in the municipality of Marataízes, Espírito Santo. It has an area of 42.20 hectares (104.3 acres). The monument, in the south of the municipality, protects a landscape of falésias (cliffs) of great scenic beauty along the beach. The cliffs, made of mudstone, sandstone and conglomerate sediments from the Miocene, are constantly being eroded. The cliffs are up to 30 metres (98 ft) in height, and extend from the Boa Vista do Sul region to the Praia dos Cações. Erosion has caused cracks and gullies in the cliffs and masses of fallen rocks lie at their base.

== History ==
The Falésias de Marataízes Natural Monument was created by municipal decree 193/2008 of 1 December 2008. It is administered by the municipal environment secretariat. It became part of the Central Atlantic Forest Ecological Corridor, created in 2002. In 2010, following approval by the Brazilian Institute of Environment and Renewable Natural Resources (IBAMA), the municipality gave approval for an iron ore shipment terminal to be built in the monument's buffer zone. The cliffs are about 5 kilometres (3.1 mi) from the port location. In January 2011 it was reported that a lookout and memorial were to be installed on the side of the Rodovia do Sol, with a display on the history of the region.

== Sources ==
- Lamas, Ivana Reis; Crepaldi, Maria Otávia; Mesquita, Carlos Alberto Bernardo (2015), Uma Rede no Corredor (PDF) (in Portuguese), Conservação Internacional (CI-Brasil), ISBN 978-85-98830-28-5
- Monumento Natural Municipal Falésias de Marataízes (in Portuguese), MERCOSUR, archived from the original on 2016-10-24
- Nunes, Everaldo Junior; Ferreira de Brito, João Henrique (2014), O Geomonumento das Falésias de Marataízes (PDF) (in Portuguese), IEMA: Instituto Estadual de Meio Ambiente e Recursos Hídricos
- Nunes Vidal, Jander (16 November 2010), Decreto-E nº. 275, de 16 de Novembro de 2010 (in Portuguese)
- Oliveira, Tarcísio (10 January 2011), "Falésias de Marataízes vão ganhar mirante e memorial", Gazeta Online (in Portuguese), archived from the original on 2016-10-24
