= Itapemirim (bus company) =

Brazilian bus company

Viação Itapemirim
- Founded: July 4, 1953; 72 years ago in Cachoeiro de Itapemirim, Espírito Santo, Brazil
- Ceased operation: April 20, 2022
- Defunct: September 21, 2022
- Headquarters: São Paulo, São Paulo, Brazil
- Website: http://www.itapemirim.com.br/

The Viação Itapemirim S.A. was a Brazilian passenger road transport company. It was founded by businessman, military veteran and later politician Camilo Cola (1923–2021) on July 4, 1953, in Cachoeiro de Itapemirim, Espírito Santo, Brazil. It was the largest road passenger transport business in Brazil and Latin America.

Due to financial difficulties and scandals involving the diversion of funds from the judicial reorganization to create ITA Transportes Aéreos, the company had a bankruptcy decree in court on September 21, 2022, after EXM Partners, responsible for the company's judicial reorganization, reported not having more chances for the group to recover financially.

== Structure ==
Viação Itapemirim is a group of companies operating in various sectors such as:

- Complex Pindobas (agricultural)
- Itabira (graphics and marketing)
- Network Flecha (Hotels and restaurants)
- Marbrasa (mining)
- Fiat Cola and Samadisa (vehicles and parts)
- MC Massad Cola (marketing and communication)
- Itabira (insurance)
- Sossai (Toyota vehicles and parts)
