= Natural monument (Brazil) =

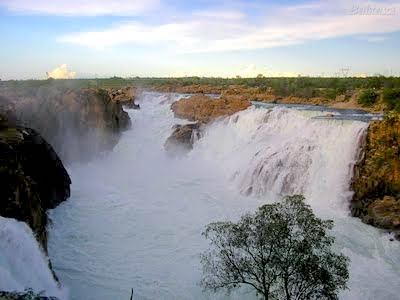
Waterfall of the São Francisco River in the Bahia city of Paulo Afonso

A Natural Monument (Portuguese: Monumento natural) in Brazil is a type of protected area of Brazil. They are created by law. The purpose of a natural monument is to conserve unique or very beautiful natural sites.

== Definition ==
The Natural Monument class of conservation unit was defined by the law 19/93 of 23 January 1993. This basic objective of this type of unit is to preserve natural sites that are unique and/or have great scenic beauty. They may be private property as long as the owner's use is compatible with the objectives. If not, the area is expropriated. The public may visit the natural monuments, and research may be conducted with permission of the responsible agency.

== Selected list ==
Name	Level	State	Created	Area (ha)
Beberibe Cliffs	State	Ceará	2004	31.2
Capão da Amizade	Municipal	Rio Grande do Sul	2009	1.3
Falésias de Marataízes	Municipal	Espírito Santo	2008	42.14
Ferro Doido Waterfall	State	Bahia	1998	362.09
Frade e a Freira	State	Espírito Santo	2007	861
Grota do Angico	State	Sergipe	2007	2,183
Gruta do Lago Azul	Federal	Mato Grosso do Sul	1978	263
Ilhas Cagarras	Federal	Rio de Janeiro	2010	523
Itabira	Municipal	Espírito Santo	1988	450
Lancinhas	State	Paraná	2006	164
Morro da Pedreira Caves	State	Federal District	2010	90.7
Morro do Penedo	Municipal	Espírito Santo	2007	18.79
Morro de Santo Antônio	State	Mato Grosso	2006	258
Morros do Pão de Açúcar e Urca	Municipal	Rio de Janeiro	2006	91.48
Pedra Grande	State	São Paulo	2010	3,297.01
Pedra das Flores	Municipal	Rio de Janeiro	2005	346
Pedra do Baú	State	São Paulo	2010	3,154
Pedra do Colégio	Municipal	Rio de Janeiro	2010	127
Pedra do Elefante	Municipal	Rio de Janeiro	2010	530
Peter Lund	State	Minas Gerais	2005	73
Pontões Capixabas	Federal	Espírito Santo	2002	17,443
Quixadá Monoliths	State	Ceará	2002	16,635
Rio Formoso	State	Mato Grosso do Sul	2003	18
Rio São Francisco	Federal	Alagoas, Bahia, Sergipe	2009	26,736
Serra das Torres	State	Espírito Santo	2010	10,458.90
Sugarloaf Mountain and Urca Hill	Municipal	Rio de Janeiro	2006	91.5
Subaé Canyons	State	Bahia	2006	404
Tocantins Fossil Trees (Árvores Fossilizadas)	State	Tocantins	2000	32,152
Valley of the Dinosaurs	Municipal	Paraíba	2002	40

== Sources ==
- Categorias de unidades de conservação (in Portuguese), Chico Mendes Institute for Biodiversity Conservation, archived from the original on 2016-05-23
