= Forno Grande State Park =

State park in Espírito Santo, Brazil

- Parque Estadual do Forno Grande
- IUCN category II (national park)
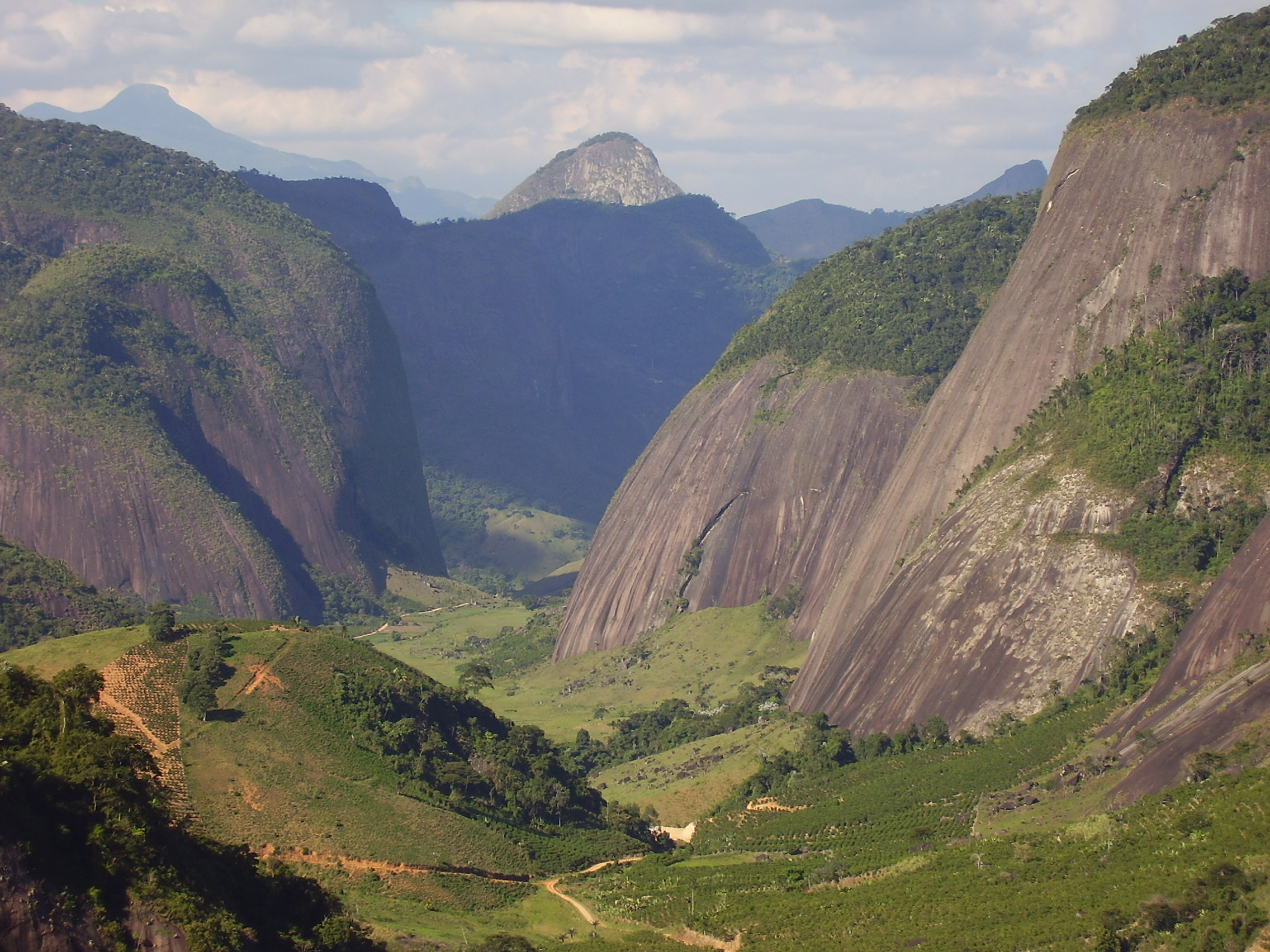
- Estrela do Norte with Forno Grande in the background

- Location within Brazil
- Nearest city: Castelo, Espírito Santo
- Coordinates: 20.520401°S 41.103060°W
- Area: 730 metres (2,400 ft)
- Designation: State park
- Created: 1998
- Administrator: Instituto Estadual do Meio Ambiente e Recursos Hídricos (IEMA)

The Forno Grande State Park (Portuguese: Parque Estadual do Forno Grande) is a state park in the state of Espírito Santo, Brazil. It protects an area of Atlantic Forest and the second highest peak in the state.

== Location ==
The Forno Grande State Park is in the municipality of Castelo, Espírito Santo. It has an area of 730 hectares (1,800 acres). It protects the second highest peak in the state of Espírito Santo, the 2,039-metre (6,690 ft) Forno Grande Peak. It contains trails and waterfalls. The area includes a large cloud forest at the top of the peak. It is home to endangered species such as the cougar (Puma concolor), ocelot (Leopardus pardalis) and southern muriqui (Brachyteles arachnoides).

The park includes a visitor center with the Onça Pintada (Cougar) museum, and is open daily from 8:00 to 17:30. The visitor center has restrooms, drinking fountains and collections of fauna and flora. There is also a small accommodation for researchers with beds, mattresses, kitchen and bathroom. Camping is not allowed, and there is no restaurant in the park, but there are facilities nearby. The park gets about 200 visitors per month.

== History ==
The Forno Grande State Park was created on 31 October 1960 as a forest reserve. In 1998 law 7.528 converted it to a state park with the objectives of conserving fauna and flora. It became part of the Central Atlantic Forest Ecological Corridor, created in 2002. It has been administered by the State Institute of the Environment and Water Resources (IEMA) since September 2007. The park was closed to visitors indefinitely in September 2016 for safety reasons, to avoid fires after a long period of drought in which the two springs had dried up.

== Sources ==
- Caliman, Beatriz (16 September 2016), "Parque Forno Grande em Castelo será fechado por tempo indeterminado", Gazeta Online (in Portuguese)
- "Forno Grande", Descubra Castelo (in Portuguese)
- Lamas, Ivana Reis; Crepaldi, Maria Otávia; Mesquita, Carlos Alberto Bernardo (2015), Uma Rede no Corredor (PDF) (in Portuguese), Conservação Internacional (CI-Brasil), ISBN 978-85-98830-28-5
- Parque Estadual do Forno Grande (in Portuguese), Castelo, archived from the original on 2016-10-25
