= Cachoeiro de Itapemirim Airport =

Airport in Brazil

Raimundo de Andrade Airport Aeroporto Raimundo de Andrade
- IATA: CDI; ICAO: SNKI; LID: ES0006

Summary
- Airport type: Public
- Serves: Cachoeiro de Itapemirim
- Time zone: BRT (UTC−03:00)
- Elevation AMSL: 78 m (256 ft)
- Coordinates: 20°50′07″S 041°11′11″W

Map
- Location in Brazil

Runways
Direction	Length		Surface
Direction	m	ft	Surface
06/24	1,200	3,937	Asphalt
- Sources: ANAC, DECEA

Raimundo de Andrade Airport (IATA: CDI, ICAO: SNKI) is the airport serving Cachoeiro de Itapemirim, Brazil.

== Access ==
The airport is located 9 km (6 mi) from downtown Cachoeiro de Itapemirim.

== See also ==
- List of airports in Brazil
