= Cachoeiro de Itapemirim =

- Municipality
- Municipality of Cachoeiro de Itapemirim
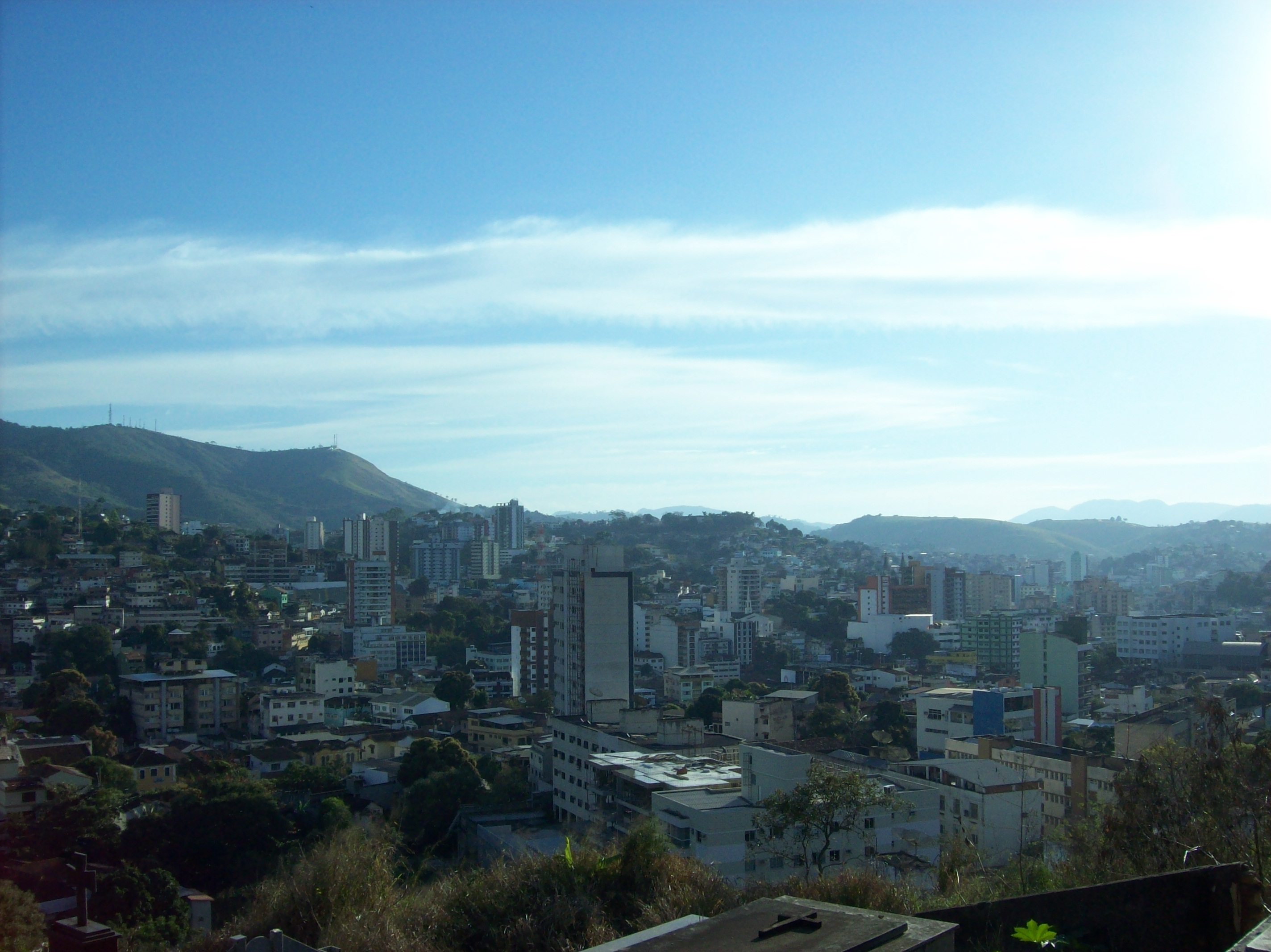
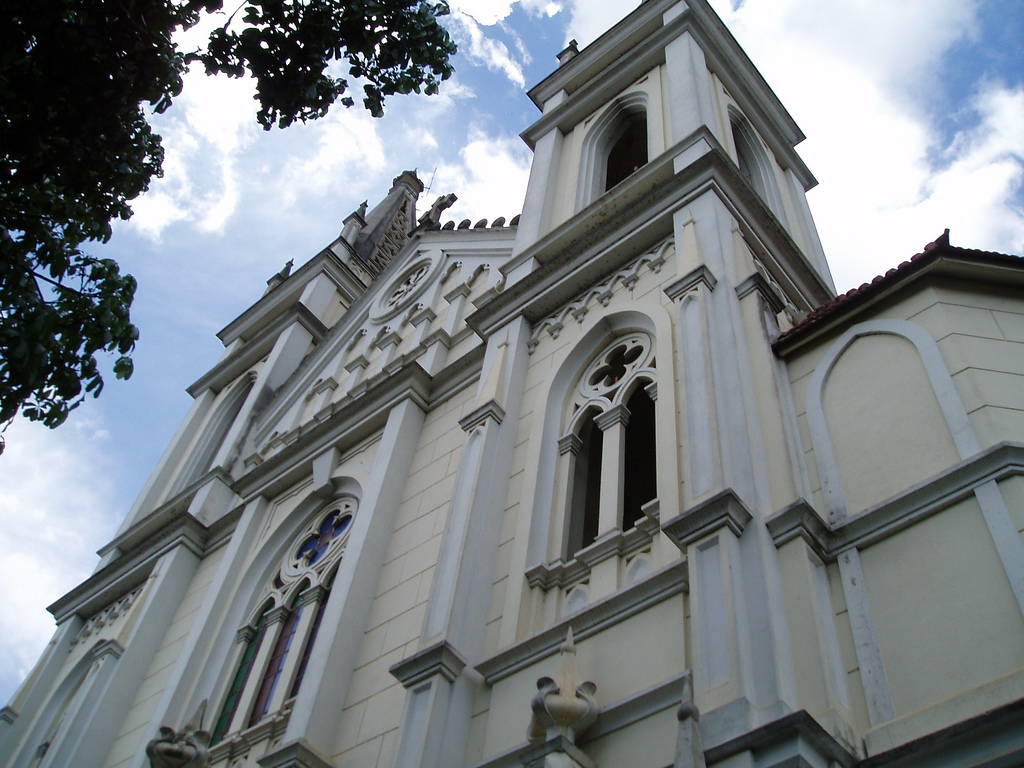
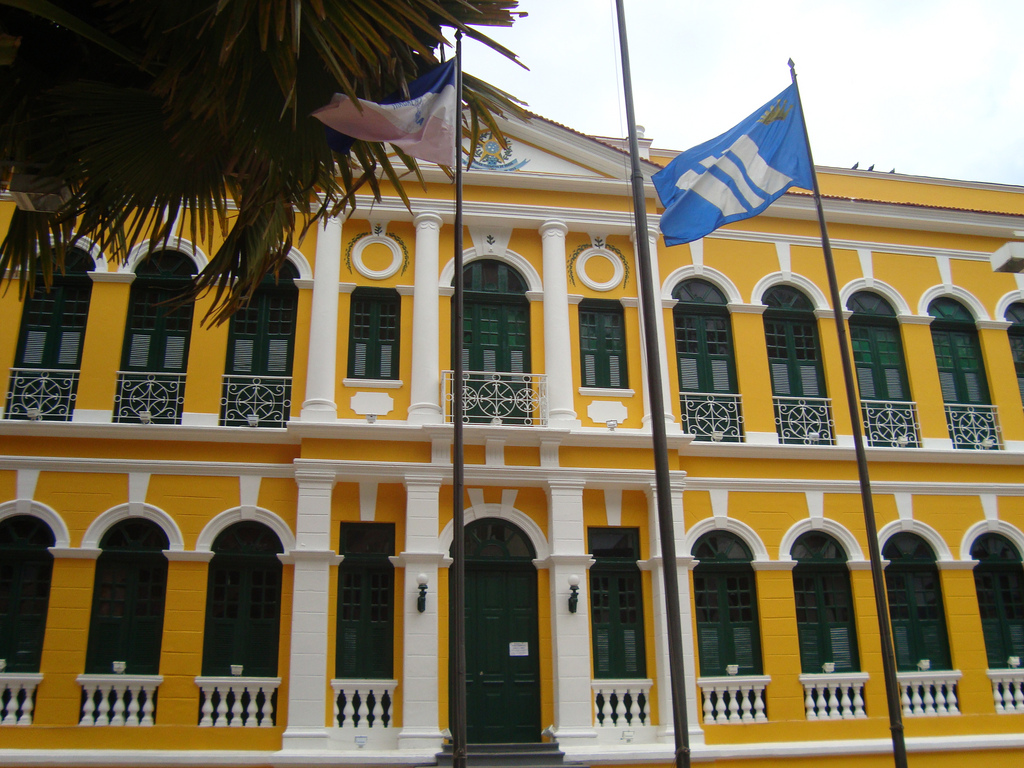
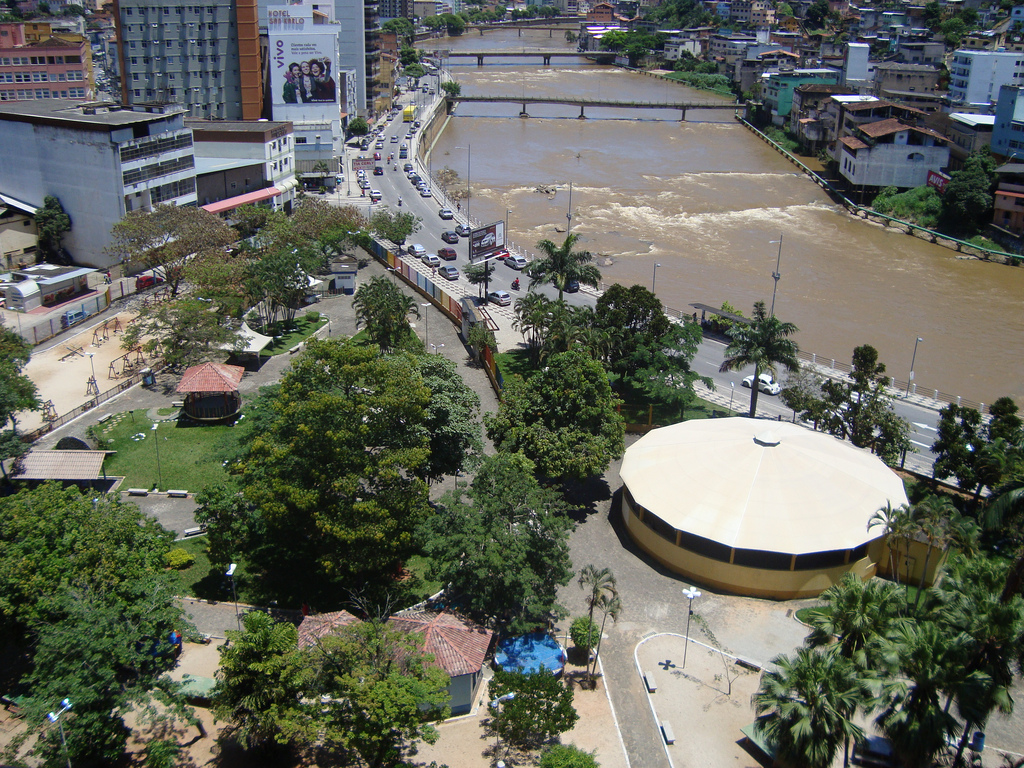
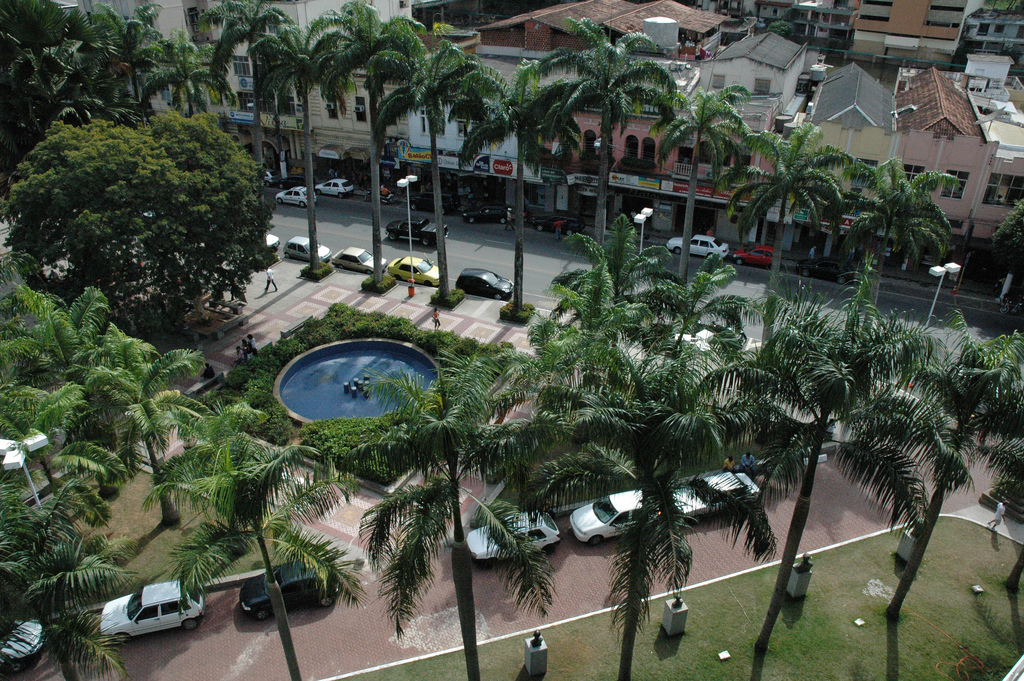
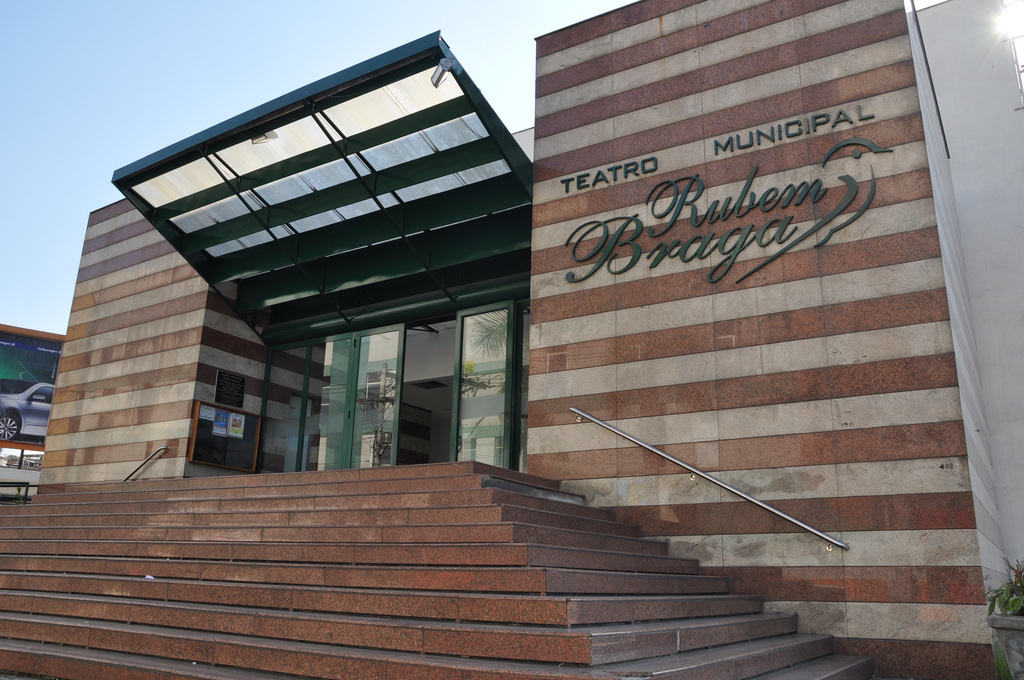
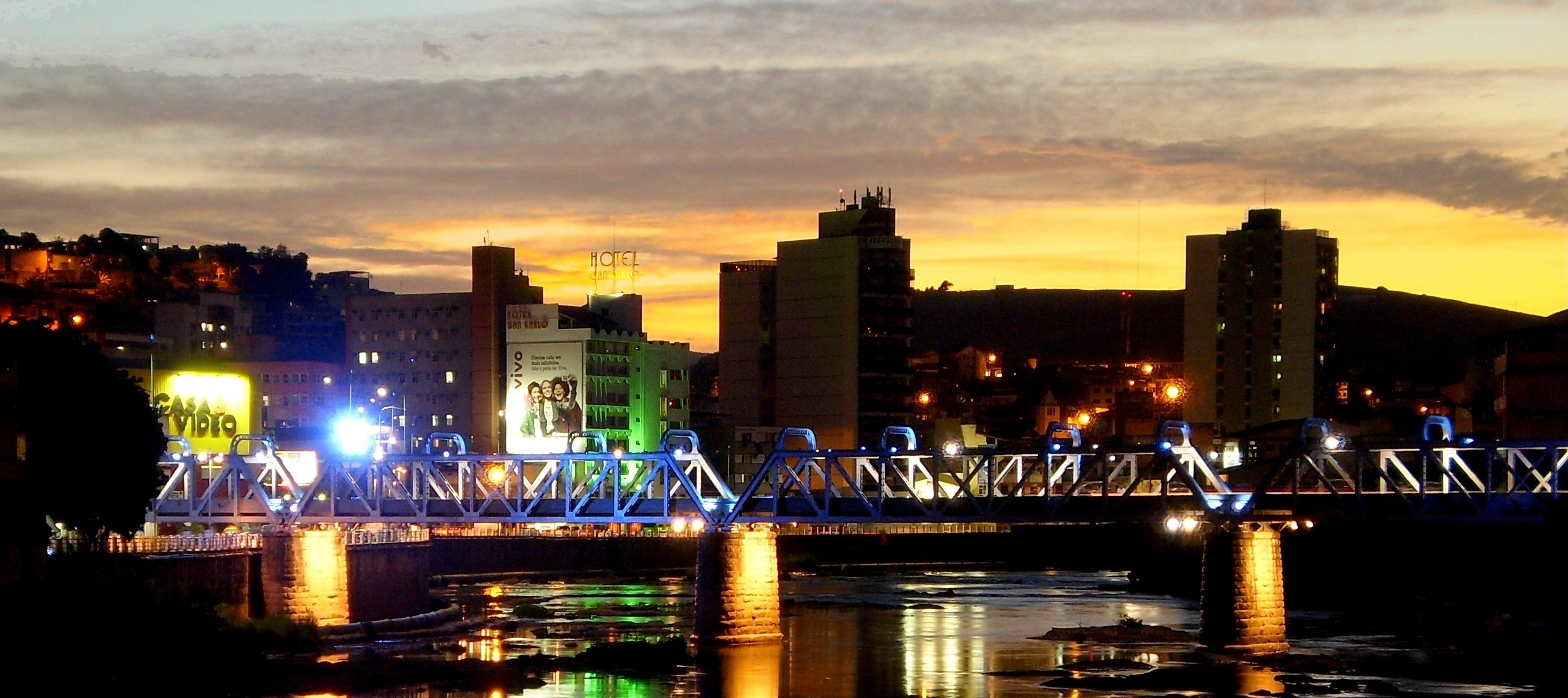

- Flag Coat of arms

- Location in Espírito Santo
- Coordinates: 20°50′56″S 41°06′46″W
- Country: Brazil
- Region: Southeast
- State: Espírito Santo
- Founded: 11 November 1890

Government
  - Type: Mayor-council
  - Mayor: Victor Coelho (PSB)

Area
  - Total: 864.583 km^{2} (333.817 sq mi)
- Elevation: 22 m (72 ft)

Population (2022 Brazilian Census)
  - Total: 185,786
  - Estimate (2025): 198,342
  - Density: 214.885/km^{2} (556.550/sq mi)
- Demonym: cachoeirense
- Time zone: UTC−3 (BRT)
- Area code: +55 28
- HDI (2010): 0.746 – high
- Website: cachoeiro.es.gov.br

Cachoeiro de Itapemirim (Portuguese pronunciation: [kaʃuˈe(j)ɾu dʒi itapemiˈɾĩj]) is a municipality and a major town, located in the south of Espírito Santo, Brazil, on the banks of the Itapemirim River. It is the economic hub of southern Espírito Santo, being the most important producer of marble and granite in Brazil. Home to one of the biggest intercity bus companies, it is a very well-connected city. The population is about 210,000. Location: 138 km south of Vitória.

== History ==
Cachoeiro de Itapemirim's first commercial establishment opened in 1853, and in 1889 its first post office and telegram services were begun. Since its early days, transport has played a major role in this town. Since it was established by a waterfall, where it would be impossible to continue the journey up the river, it became an important stop for gold prospectors traveling to Minas Gerais. Many immigrant families which travelled to southern Espírito Santo established in the region.

== Transport ==
The railway line to Rio de Janeiro was completed in 1900, allowing both cultural and economical influence from the latter. In 1911 the railway to Vitória was completed, strengthening links to the north.

The city is served by Cachoeiro de Itapemirim Airport.

== Attractions ==
The municipality contains the 451 hectares (1,110 acres) Pacotuba National Forest, created in 2002. The quilombola community of Monte Alegre offers ethnic, cultural and environmental tourism in partnership with the forest and the ministry of tourism. This includes crafts and gastronomy, expression of traditions and community lifestyle, and guided tours of the forest. The municipality contains part of the protected area of the Frade e a Freira Natural Monument. It contains the 452 hectares (1,120 acres) Itabira Natural Monument. The city is nicknamed A capital oculta do mundo, meaning "the secret capital of the world".

== Notable people ==
- Roberto Carlos, singer known as The King of Brazilian Music
- Rubem Braga, a chronist writer
- Luz del Fuego, actress, famous in the United States in the 1950s, starred on Broadway IMDB
- Noemi Cavalcanti, actress IMDB
- Sérgio Sampaio, actor IMDB
- Raul Sampaio, actor IMDB
- Carlos Imperial, actor
- Charles Fricks, actor IMDB
- Ramon de Morais Motta, footballer
- Maxwell Cabelino Andrade, footballer
- Bujica (Marcelo Ribeiro), footballer
- Larissa França, professional beach volleyball player and holder of the Guinness World Record for most women’s FIVB Beach Volleyball World Tour gold medals won by an individual.
- Didi Louzada, former NBA player
