= Fundão Municipality =

Fundão may refer to:

== Places ==
=== Brazil ===
- Fundão Municipality, Brazil, a municipality in the State of Espírito Santo

=== Portugal ===
- Fundão Municipality, Portugal, a municipality in the district of Castelo Branco
