= Fundão =

Fundão may refer to the following places:

== Brazil ==
- Fundão, Espírito Santo, a municipality in the State of Espírito Santo
- Fundão (Rio de Janeiro), a neighborhood in the Zona Norte of the State of Rio de Janeiro
- Fundão Island, an artificial island in Rio de Janeiro; see Federal University of Rio de Janeiro
- Fundão dam, also known as the Mariana Dam, Bento Rodrigues Dam or Samarco Dam, scene of a disastrous dam collapse in 2015.

== Portugal ==
- Fundão, Portugal, a municipality in the district of Castelo Branco
