= Quilombo Retiro =

Quilombo Retiro is a quilombo remnant community certified by the Palmares Cultural Foundation, located in the city of Santa Leopoldina, Espírito Santo. Also known as Retiro, Retiro do Mangaraí or Cachoeira do Retiro.

== Documented history ==
Quilombo Retiro received its certification through decree no. 39 of September 29, 2005, issued by the Palmares Foundation and published in the DOU. The community has a public deed of purchase and sale, dated September 4, 1892, in the name of Benvindo Pereira dos Anjos.

According to studies carried out by anthropologist Osvaldo Martins de Oliveira, the area now known as Retiro was acquired by Benvindo Pereira dos Anjos in 1912. Before that, however, in 1892, Benvindo had already registered another area in his name, known as Conceição. Originally from Angola and married to Maria Pereira das Neves, Benvindo is believed to have died in 1919 and bequeathed both areas to his descendants.

From the 1960s onwards, the total area of the quilombo was reduced by violent threats from farmers and subterfuge by merchants (debts incurred and support from the police at the time led to expulsion). Only in 1985 was the community able to obtain land titles with the help of the Rural Workers' Union. And, in 1991, the Association of Heirs of Benvindo Pereira dos Anjos (AHBPA) was created.

Today the quilombo occupies approximately 160 hectares in the rural area of the municipality , for the 77 families that inhabit the community (data from 05/31/2021), who requested the titling of 519.5160 hectares, through process no. 54340.000528/2004-99, opened in 2004.The claim for recognition with the Palmares Cultural Foundation (FCP) was based on a report derived from research carried out at the Postgraduate Program in Anthropology and Political Science of the Federal Fluminense University (PPGCP/UFF).

Currently, the Municipality of Santa Leopoldina provides the community only with the maintenance of a primary school, the weekly garbage collection service, and sporadic resources for the Banda de Congo Unidos do Retiro.

In 2012, the National Institute for Colonization and Agrarian Reform (INCRA) was granted possession of 121 hectares within the territory titled as a Remnant of Quilombola Community, where dozens of families reside and live off agricultural activities.

== Congo Unidos do Retiro Band ==
The Congo dance of the State of Espírito Santo is similar to what is known in other regions of Brazil as “congado”, “congada” or “reinado”. This dance is part of a tradition from a region of Africa, taught by ancestors of African descent, and established in the Santa Leopoldina region during the time of slavery. With the threats and subterfuges to reduce the lands of the quilombo and expel the inhabitants, in the 1960s, the Congo ceased to be danced. In 1991, when the Association of Heirs of Benvindo Pereira dos Anjos (AHBPA) was created, the Banda de Congo Unidos do Retiro was also created so that the traditions could be revived. The Congo was danced again for Saint Benedict, every December 26th, and Saint Sebastian, every January 20th.

On Saint Benedict's Day, the band gathers its instruments and members, a procession leaves the Community Center and goes to the Community Center Square, where the mast is erected and the Saint Benedict flag is hoisted. There, various songs are sung and danced in homage to the patron saint of the congo and protector of the group (Saint Benedict). The entire celebration lasts about an hour and a half. On Saint Sebastian's Day, a new celebration is held for the removal of the mast, with prayers to Saint Benedict, Saint Sebastian and Our Lady of Aparecida. The procession takes the mast to the house of the oldest descendant of Jorge Benvindo.
