= Ibiraçu =

Ibiraçu Município de Ibiraçu
- Municipality
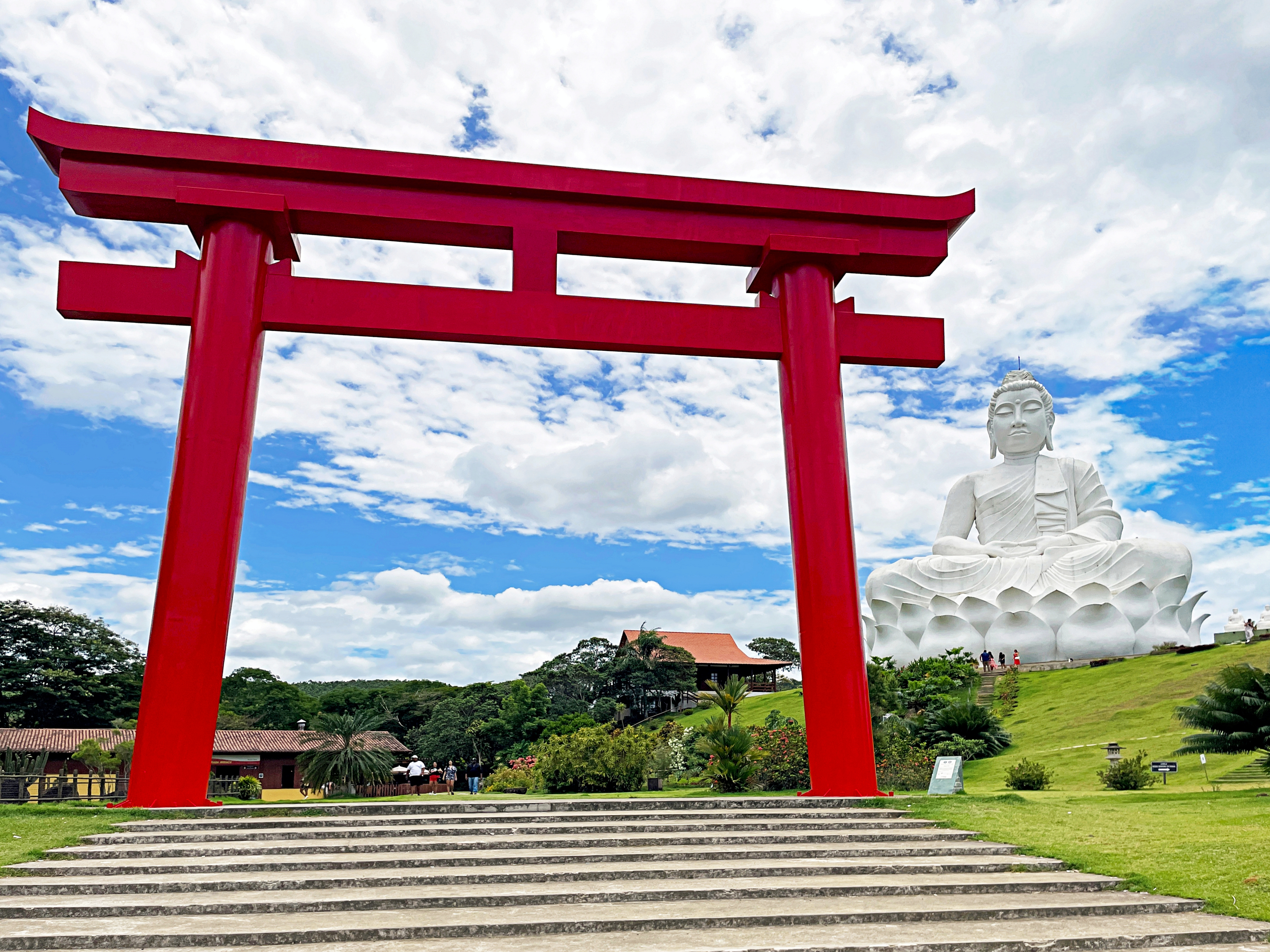
- Torii of the Morro da Vargem Zen Buddhist Monastery and the Buddha of Ibiraçu

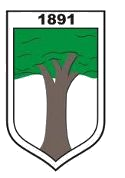
- Flag Coat of arms

- Location of Ibiraçu in Espírito Santo

- Location of Ibiraçu in Brazil
- Coordinates: 19°49′55″S 40°22′12″W
- Country: Brazil
- Region: Northeast
- State: Espírito Santo
- Founded: September 11, 1891

Government
  - Mayor: Eduardo Marozzi Zanotti

Area
  - Total: 201.25 km^{2} (77.70 sq mi)
- Elevation: 75 m (246 ft)

Population (2020)
  - Total: 12,591
  - Density: 62.564/km^{2} (162.04/sq mi)
- Demonym: Ibiraçuense
- Time zone: UTC−3 (BRT)
- Website: ibiracu.es.gov.br

Ibiraçu is the name of a municipality in the state of Espírito Santo, Brazil. It covers 201.25 km^{2} (77.70 mi^{2}), and has a population of 12,591 with a population density of 66 inhabitants per square kilometer. 73% of the population resides in urban areas and 27% in rural areas. Ibiraçu borders on the municipalities of João Neiva (N), Santa Teresa (W), Fundão (S). It is located 75 kilometres (47 mi) north of the state capital of Vitória.

The topography of Ibiraçu consists of rolling hills and some mountainous areas. Noted peaks in the municipality include Monte Negro, Morro Encantado, and Morro da Vargem.

== History ==
Ibiraçu was founded in 1877 by a group of 54 families who departed from the Genoa region of northern Italy. After a voyage by steam boat of 35 days the immigrants arrived in the state capital of Vitória, were briefly quarantined, then traveled by boat and canoe to colonize the headwaters of the Piraqueaçu River. The area they settled was then known as Santa Cruz Colonial Nucleus (Núcleo Colonial Santa Cruz), since the most accessible town to it was Santa Cruz, at the mouth of the Piraqueaçu. The early settlers of the municipality were affected by the yellow fever outbreak of 1895, which both suspended further settlement of Espírito Santo and killed 41 members.

The capital of this area was first known as Conde D'eu, and was later known by many names such as Bocaiúva (after the proclamation of the republic), Vila Guaraná (after it became a municipality), Pau Gigante in 1892 (meaning giant tree, due to a large tree in the region), and only in 1942 did both the town and municipality gain Ibiraçu as their name. In recent history it is notable to mention the separation of João Neiva municipality.

== Monastery ==
Morro da Vargem, a mountain at the south of Ibiraçu, is home to Mosteiro Zen Morro da Vargem, a Sōtō Zen Buddhist monastery. It was founded in 1974 and claims to be the first Buddhist monastery in South America. The monastery has focused on the reforestation of Morro da Vargem and the restoration of Atlantic Forest (Mata Atlântica) vegetation. In August 2021, the 35-meter-tall Buddha of Ibiraçu was inaugurated at the monastery's Torii Square.

== Economy ==
The cultivation of coffee and eucalyptus forms the basis of the economy of Ibiraçu. Fish farming is new to the municipality.
