= Buddha of Ibiraçu =

Monumental sculpture

- Great Buddha of Ibiraçu, Giant Buddha
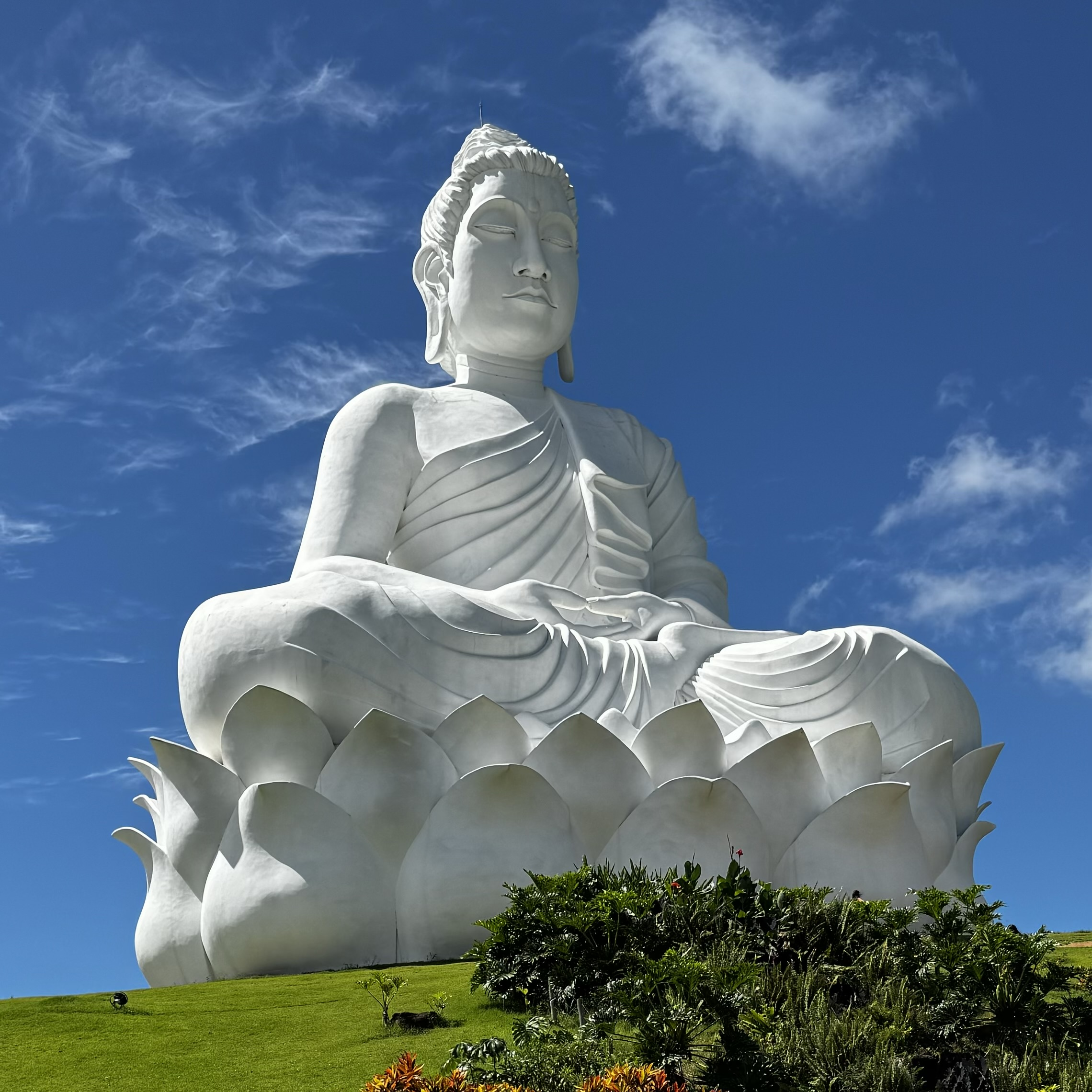
- Buddha of Ibiraçu in February 2024
- Artist: Genésio Gomes Moura
- Completion date: October 2020
- Medium: Iron, steel, and concrete
- Subject: Buddha
- Dimensions: 35 m (115 ft)
- Weight: 350 tons
- Location: Ibiraçu; 19.865494°S 40.382522°W

The Buddha of Ibiraçu (Brazilian Portuguese: Buda de Ibiraçu), also known as the Great Buddha of Ibiraçu (Brazilian Portuguese: Grande Buda de Ibiraçu) or Giant Buddha (Brazilian Portuguese: Buda Gigante), is a Brazilian gigantic statue of the Buddha located in the city of Ibiraçu, Espírito Santo.

== Details ==
Inaugurated in August 2021, (Note: The work was completed in October 2020 and was scheduled to be inaugurated in April 2021, but the event was postponed due to the COVID-19 pandemic.) after over a year of construction, it stands on the banks of the BR-101 Highway, at the Torii Square in the Morro da Vargem Zen Monastery. (Note: More precisely at Km 217) Conceived by Genésio Gomes Moura, the monument depicts the Buddha as an "enlightened being", seated atop a lotus flower. Alongside the main stature are 15 further meditative statues of the Buddha, each measuring 2.5 meters (8.2 feet). It is believed to be the largest Buddha statue in the Western world. The Buddha of Ibiraçu stands 35 meters (115 feet) tall and weighs 350 tonnes of iron, steel, and concrete. Approximately 30,000 people visit the statue monthly.
