= Victoria metropolitan area =

Victoria metropolitan area may refer to:

- Victoria metropolitan area, Texas, United States
- Greater Victoria, British Columbia, Canada

== See also ==
- Greater Vitória, Espírito Santo, Brazil
