= Fundão, Espírito Santo =

Fundão
- Municipality
- Municipality of Fundão
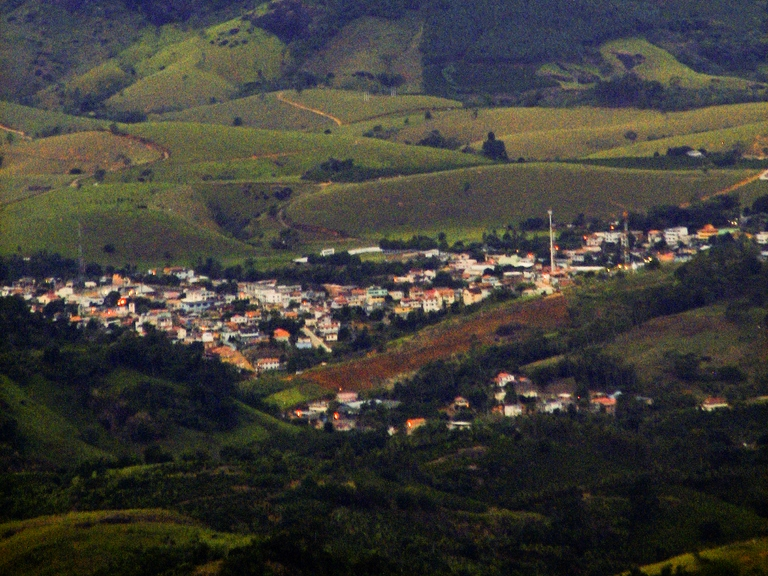
- View of Fundão from the peak of Goiapaba-Açu

- Flag Coat of arms

- Location in Espírito Santo

- Coordinates: 19°55′58″S 40°24′25″W
- Country: Brazil
- Region: Southeast
- State: Espírito Santo
- Intermediate Region: Vitória
- Immediate Region: Vitória
- Metropolitan Region: Vitória
- Neighboring municipalities: South: Serra; Southwest: Santa Leopoldina; West: Santa Teresa; North: Ibiraçu; Northeast: Aracruz.
- Founded: 5 July 1923; 103 years ago

Government
  - Mayor: Gilmar de Souza Borges (PSB)
  - Term start: 1 January 2021
  - City council: 11 councilors
  - Districts: Fundão, Praia Grande, Timbuí, and Irundi (IBGE/2008)

Area
  - Municipality: 288.724 km^{2} (111.477 sq mi)
  - Urban: 0.9 km^{2} (0.35 sq mi)
- Elevation: 41 m (135 ft)

Population (2022)
  - Municipality: 18,014
  - Rank: 42nd
  - Density: 62.392/km^{2} (161.59/sq mi)
- Demonym: Fundãoense
- Time zone: UTC−3 (BRT)
- Postal Code: 29185-000
- Area code: +55 27
- GDP (IBGE/2018): R$475,925
- GDP per capita (IBGE/2018): R$22,597.47
- Gini (2010): 0.49
- HDI (UNDP/2010): 0.718
- Patron saint: Saint Joseph
- Climate: Tropical savanna climate (Aw)
- Distance to capital: 53 kilometres (33 mi)
- Website: http://www.fundao.es.gov.br

Fundão (Portuguese pronunciation: [fũˈdɐ̃w]) is a Brazilian municipality in the state of Espírito Santo. Part of the Greater Vitória metropolitan region, the Intermediate Region of Vitória, and the Immediate Region of Vitória, it is located north of the state capital, approximately 53 kilometres (33 mi) away. Covering an area of 288.724 square kilometres (111.477 sq mi), of which 0.9 square kilometres (0.35 sq mi) is urban, its population was recorded as 18,014 inhabitants by the Brazilian Institute of Geography and Statistics (IBGE) in 2022.

The average annual temperature in the municipal seat is 23.2 °C (73.8 °F), with the predominant vegetation being Atlantic Forest. With an urbanization rate of approximately 84%, the municipality had five healthcare facilities in 2009. Its Human Development Index (HDI) is 0.718, classified as high.

Fundão was emancipated from the former municipality of Nova Almeida in 1923. Today, it comprises the city of Fundão and the districts of Praia Grande, Timbuí, and Irundi. The municipality's name originates from the Fundão River, which flows through the seat. The primary economic activity is coffee production, though the industrial sector contributes the largest share to the municipal Gross Domestic Product (GDP).

As part of the Caminho dos Imigrantes tourist route, Fundão is home to the Pico do Goiapaba-Açu, a granite peak rising 850 metres (2,790 ft) where the Goiapaba-Açu Municipal Park is located. Praia Grande is a major tourist attraction in the region, drawing visitors from Minas Gerais and other parts of Espírito Santo. Between December and January, the festivals of Saint Benedict and Saint Sebastian are held in Timbuí and Fundão, featuring performances by congo bands.

== History ==
=== Origins ===
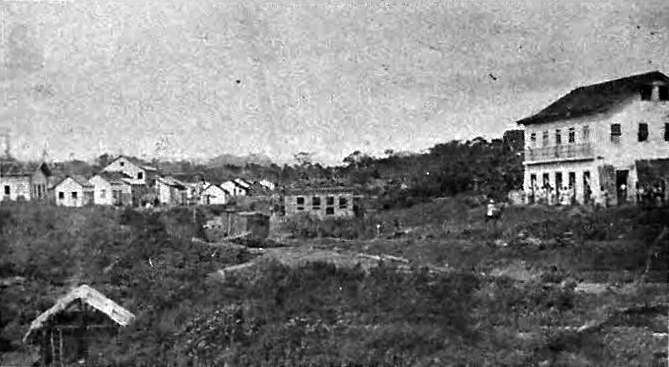
The Fundão Cultural House, on the right, still as the Agostini family residence, and the old railway before 1922, when the municipal seat was Nova Almeida.

Fundão historically succeeds the former municipality of Nova Almeida. Nova Almeida was established on the banks of the Reis Magos River as the Aldeia dos Reis Magos on 6 January 1557, by Jesuits and the Temiminó tribe, led by cacique Maracaiaguaçu, father of Arariboia. In 1757, Nova Almeida was elevated to a parish and town, and in 1760, to a comarca. Due to various factors, from the 1820s onward, Nova Almeida's population, which exceeded 8,000 inhabitants, began to decline, leading to the town's decay.

The first Italian immigrants, the Agostini family, arrived in the current Fundão region in 1875 from Tyrol, settling in Três Barras (now Irundi). In the following decades, dozens of other families arrived in Fundão directly from Italy or were relocated from other regions, particularly Santa Teresa. During the construction of the Vitória-Minas Railway in the interior of Nova Almeida, workers perished in the waters of the Fundão River, named for its depth before the end of the 19th century. In the same location, at the Taquaraçu Farm owned by pioneer Cândido Vieira, the village of Fundão emerged.

=== Administrative formation ===
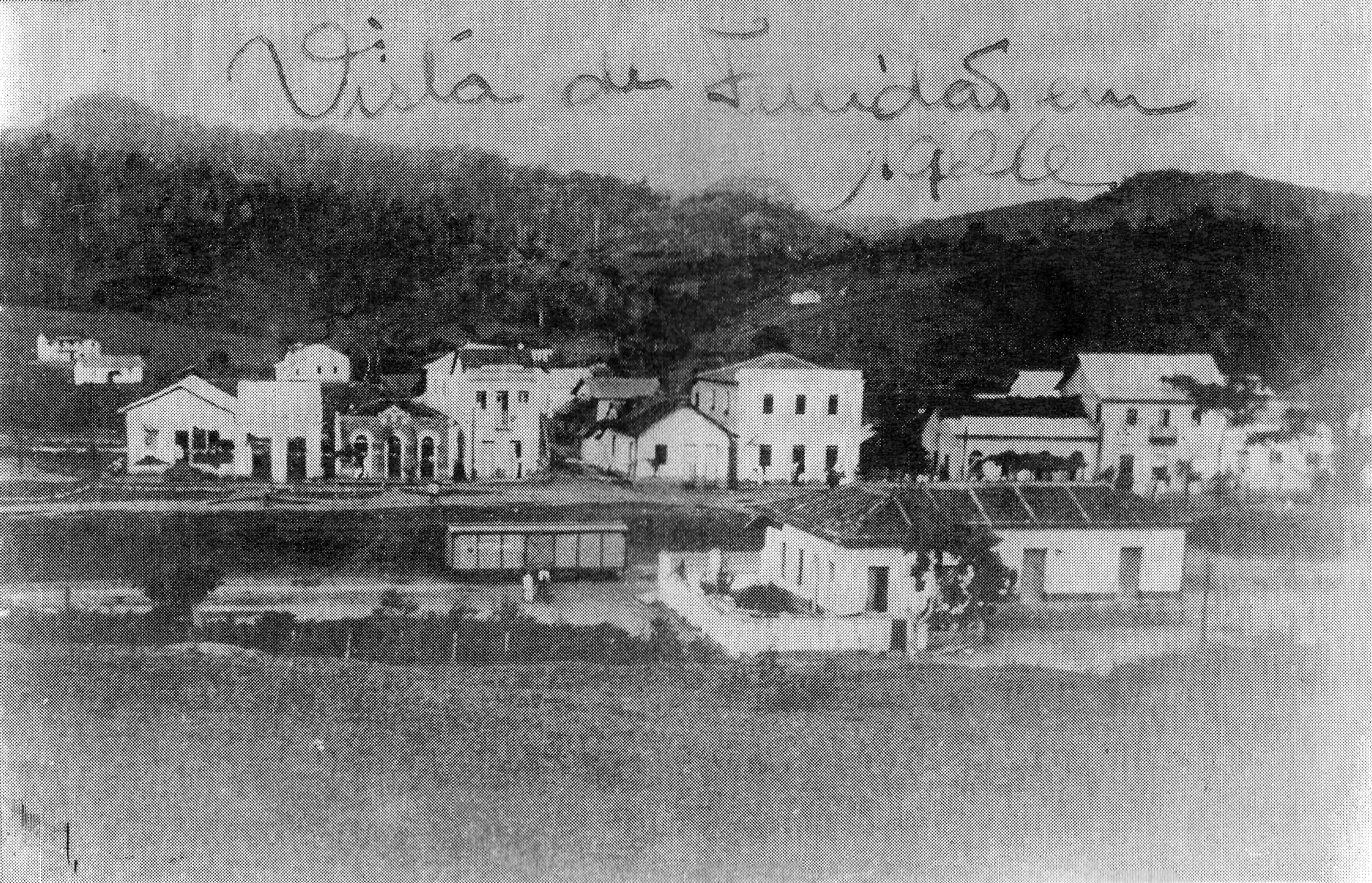
View of Fundão in 1926.

Various sources provide conflicting and contradictory information regarding the municipality's administrative formation. The seat was transferred to Timbuí in the early 20th century. The Fundão City Council's page and a message from Nestor Gomes, president of Espírito Santo, to the state Legislative Congress on 3 May 1923, indicate that the municipality was renamed Timbuí or Timbuhy. However, the 1920 census does not reference this name. Under state law 1,383 of 5 July 1923, the "former municipality of Nova Almeida" had its seat transferred from Timbuí to Fundão, renaming the municipality Fundão and elevating the new seat to the status of a town. The law took effect on 1 January 1924, when the Fundão City Council was inaugurated in the new seat. Contradictorily, sources such as the Enciclopédia dos Municípios Brasileiros and Fundão's own coat of arms and flag cite 5 July 1933, rather than 1923, as the municipality's creation date.

By decree-law of 2 March 1938, Fundão was elevated to city status. Later that year, on 11 November, the district of Nova Almeida was transferred to the municipality of Serra. At the same time, the district of Três Barras (now Irundi) was transferred from Santa Teresa to Fundão.

In 2002, municipal law 229 was enacted, proposing to rename Fundão to Balneário Reis Magos, contingent on a referendum approved by the Legislative Assembly of Espírito Santo.

=== Recent history ===
The four most-voted mayoral candidates in elections from 1996 to 2016 (Gilmar de Souza Borges, Maria Dulce Rudio Soares, Marcos Fernando Moraes, and Anderson Pedroni Gorza) faced legal proceedings at some point.

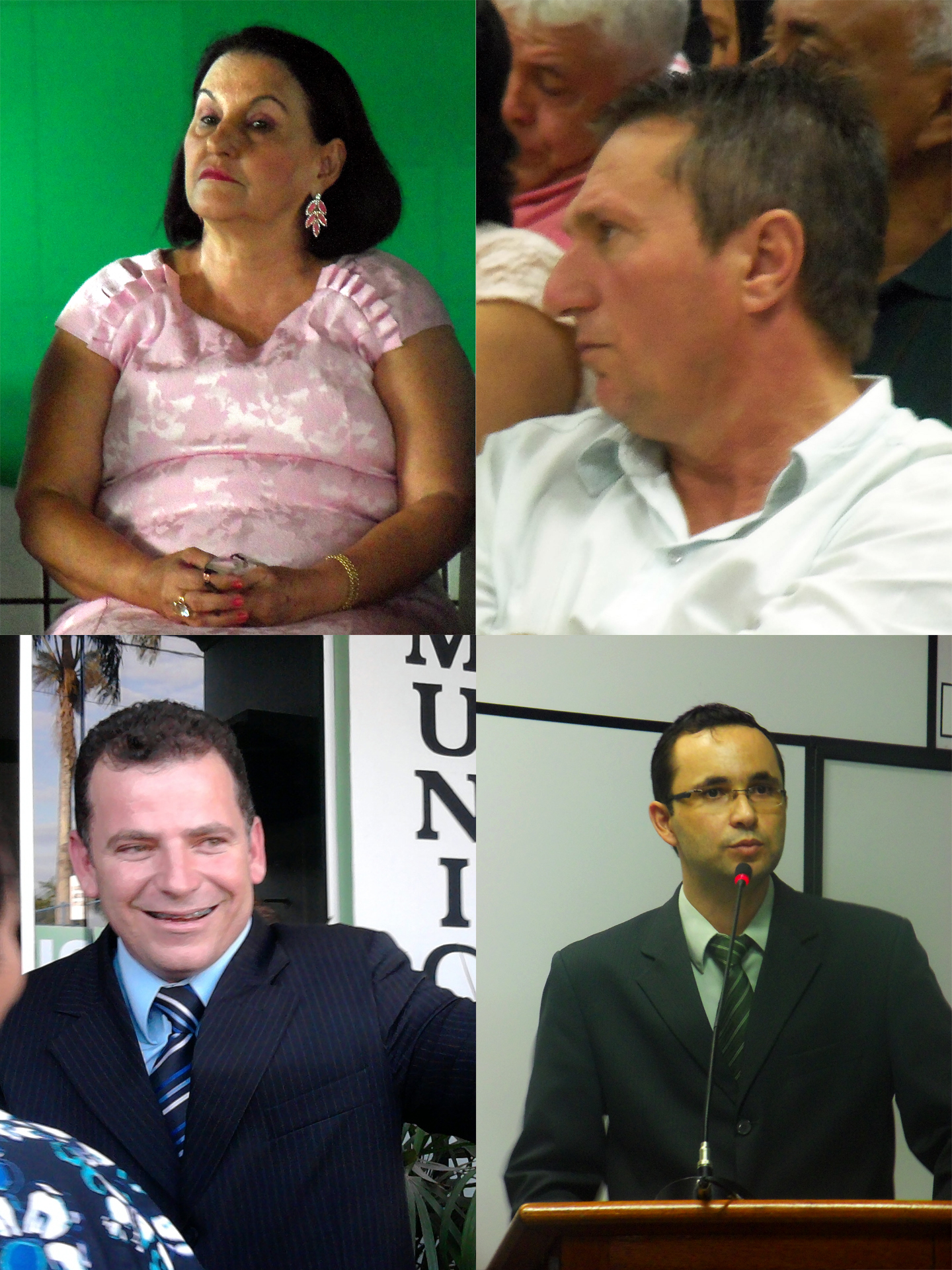
Mayors of Fundão between 2005 and 2016: above, Maria Dulce (2005–2008 and 2013–2016) and Marquinhos (2009–2011); below, Anderson Pedroni (2011–2012) and Claydson Rodrigues (2012).

In 2000, during his third term, Gilmar de Souza Borges faced allegations reported to the Public Prosecutor's Office, leading to an inconclusive parliamentary inquiry commission (CPI). From 2008, the final year of her mayoral term, Maria Dulce Rudio Soares was accused in multiple public civil actions and complaints by the Espírito Santo Public Prosecutor's Office (MPES), resulting in two convictions for administrative misconduct in 2012. Maria Dulce's 2008 re-election candidacy was temporarily suspended, but validated through an appeal. In the subsequent election, she was defeated by Marcos Fernando Moraes (PDT).

On 27 May 2011, Operation Tsunami led to the arrest of twelve individuals accused of corruption in the city hall and city council, including secretaries, councilors, and businessmen. The Public Prosecutor's Office requested the Judiciary to remove Mayor Marcos Fernando Moraes and Vice-Mayor Ademir Loureiro de Almeida (PSC) for administrative misconduct. Accusing councilors demanded the revocation of the involved politicians' mandates. On 30 May, councilors unanimously decided to establish a CPI to investigate evidence of irregularities in the provision of meal vouchers to city employees. On 1 June, Mayor Marcos Fernando Moraes dismissed the arrested secretaries.

On 3 June, the Judiciary removed the mayor, vice-mayor, and several secretaries and municipal employees from their positions. The city council president, Councilor Anderson Pedroni Gorza (PCdoB), assumed the role of acting mayor. Through an appeal, Marquinhos resumed the mayoral position on 3 August following a 29 July decision by the Espírito Santo Court of Justice. Due to allegations of irregularities in school transportation, the MPES filed a new request to remove the chief executive.

On 5 August, the Espírito Santo Court of Justice (TJES) reinstated Ademir Loureiro de Almeida as vice-mayor, but the following week, the Judiciary upheld an MPES request to keep Ademir and other defendants removed from their positions. On 31 August, a processing commission's report that would have investigated Marquinhos and removed him for 180 days was shelved.

The next day (1 September), Marquinhos and Ademir were again removed from executive leadership by the Judiciary, accused in a school transportation scheme. City Council President Anderson Pedroni Gorza assumed the mayoralty on an interim basis again on 5 September. On 20 October, Judge Pedro Valls Feu Rosa, president of the TJES First Criminal Chamber, upheld Marquinhos' precautionary removal through a preliminary injunction related to criminal proceedings concerning school transportation and the emergency hiring of the Ambiental company.

Due to his failure to submit public account balance sheets to the city council during his tenure, Anderson Pedroni Gorza was removed from the interim mayoral position on 1 March 2012, following the establishment of a processing commission. Additionally, a CPI was opened against him to investigate potential irregularities in school construction projects. He was notified on 6 March. On 7 March, the acting city council president, Claydson Pimentel Rodrigues, assumed the role. On 12 June, former interim mayor Gorza had his councilor mandate revoked. On 15 June, a complaint regarding alleged irregularities in the hiring for the city council building renovation, which would have led to Claydson Pimentel Rodrigues' removal, was dismissed.

In the 7 October 2012, elections, the last interim mayors, Anderson Pedroni and Claydson, along with João Manoel (DEM), candidates for mayor for the 2013–2016 term, were defeated with 37.43% of the votes by former mayor Maria Dulce, despite her first-instance conviction by the TJES for administrative misconduct due to overbilling.

On 26 March 2015, the city council rejected the 2011 accounts of former mayors Marcos Fernando Moraes and Anderson Pedroni Gorza, rendering them ineligible for eight years. In the 2016 elections, Anderson Pedroni Gorza, now with the PSD, was the most-voted mayoral candidate in Fundão with 8,564 votes, 77% of the total. However, due to his candidacy's disqualification, the interim mayor from 1 January 2017, until a new elected mayor's inauguration was the city council president, Eleazar Ferreira Lopes (then with PCdoB). After winning the supplementary election on 1 October 2017, Pretinho Nunes (PDT) was sworn in as mayor on 27 October.

In the 2020 municipal elections, after sixteen years out of office, former mayor Gilmar de Souza Borges was elected for a fourth term with 50.09% of the votes, against 47.45% for former interim mayor Eleazar Ferreira Lopes (Podemos) and 2.46% for Carlos Magno Barbosa Fracalossi (PSDB). In the 2024 municipal elections, former interim mayor Eleazar Ferreira Lopes was elected with 53.31% of the votes, against 38.84% for former interim mayor Anderson Pedroni and 7.85% for councilor Aélcio Peixoto (PL).

== Geography ==
The municipality’s area is 279.648 square kilometres (107.973 sq mi), representing 0.6069% of Espírito Santo’s territory, 0.0302% of the Southeast Region of Brazil, and 0.0033% of Brazil’s total territory. Of this, 0.9 square kilometres (0.35 sq mi) is within the urban perimeter.

Fundão is situated in the Intermediate Region of Vitória and the Immediate Region of Vitória. It borders Ibiraçu to the north, Aracruz to the northeast, the Atlantic Ocean to the east, Serra to the south, Santa Leopoldina to the southwest, and Santa Teresa to the west, and is 53 kilometres (33 mi) from Vitória.

=== Topography and hydrography ===
Despite its relatively small area, Fundão extends from the coast to the Serra do Castelo, a prominent geographical feature in central Espírito Santo. Its terrain is highly undulating, with 61.53% of its area having a slope of less than 30%. The eastern region consists of lowlands and a nearly straight coastline, except for the Flecheira point, while the western region features elevations shaped by crystalline rocks. Located 13 kilometres (8.1 mi) from the seat, on the border with Santa Teresa, is the Pico do Goiapaba-Açu, a granite formation rising 850 metres (2,790 ft), offering views of the region between Greater Vitória and Linhares.

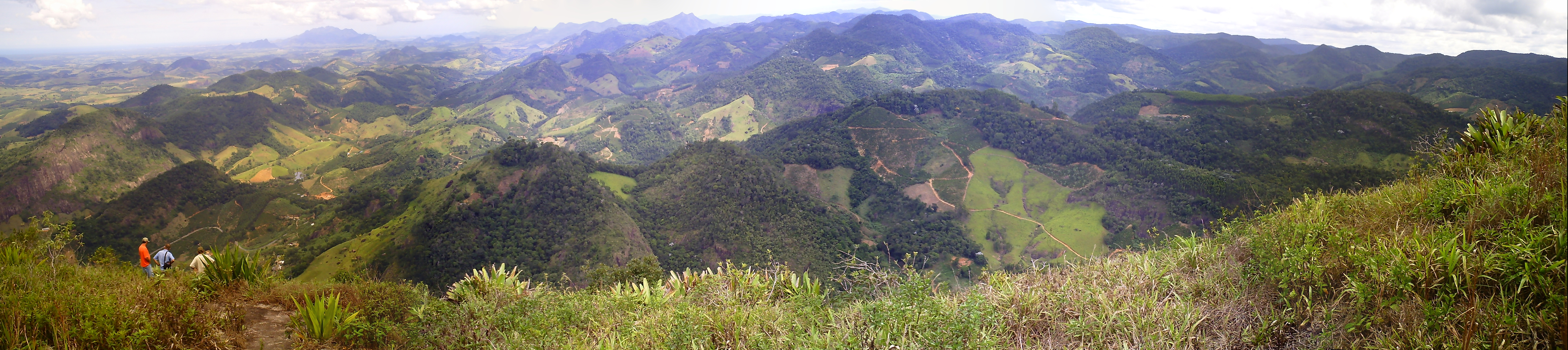
The terrain of Fundão and Santa Leopoldina as seen from Pico do Goiapaba-Açu.

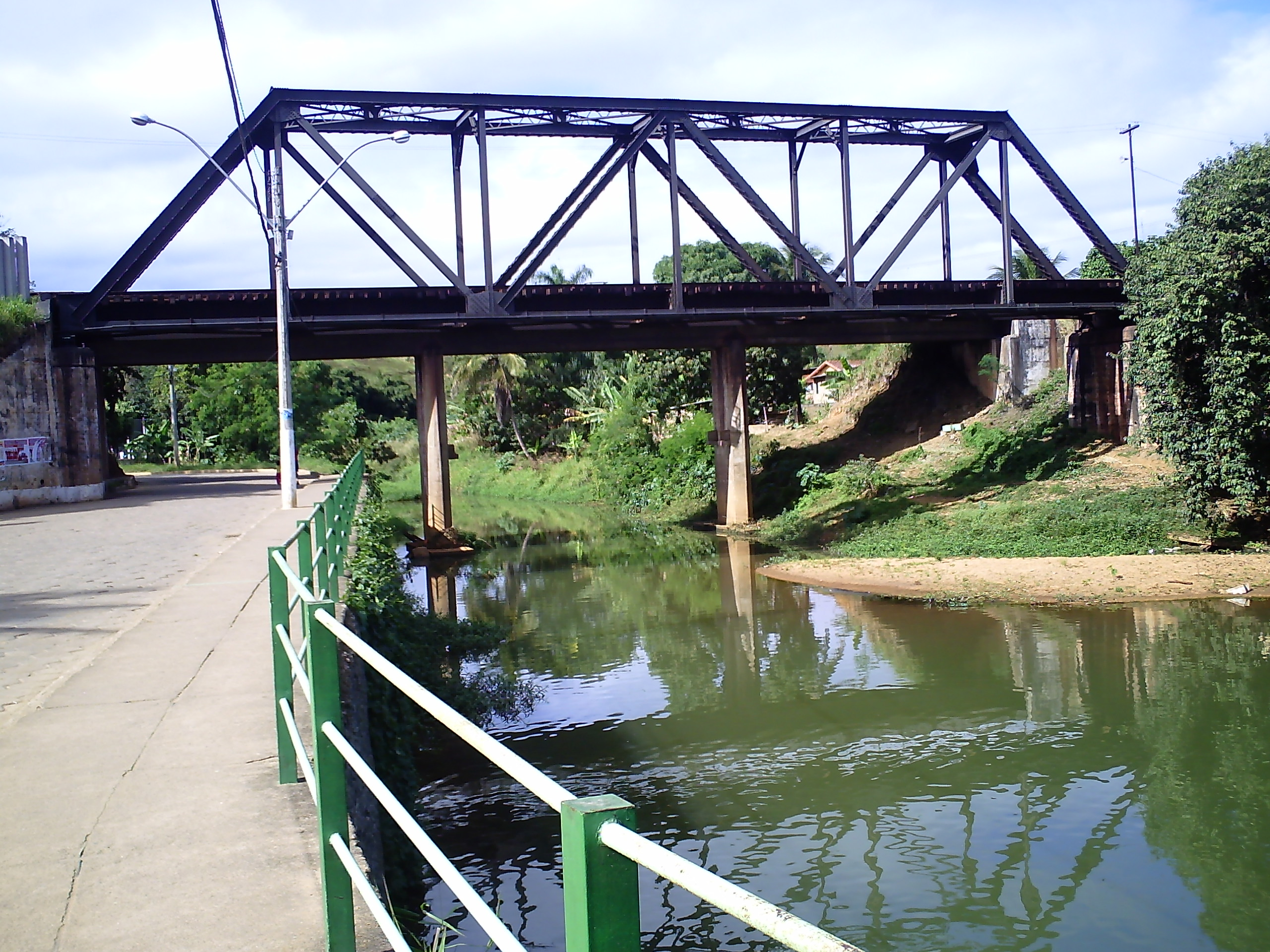
The Fundão River, which gives the city its name.

The municipality’s soil is predominantly dystrophic red-yellow latosol and red-yellow podzolic soil, clayey, with medium to low fertility and a pH of 5.0. It has moderate depth, good drainage, and low susceptibility to erosion. There are patches of organomineral soils, poorly developed, typical of flooded plains, acidic, with considerable but agriculturally limited mineral reserves due to excessive soil moisture in gley and organic soils. There are also patches of sandy soil, deep, with high aluminum saturation, high acidity, leaching, low moisture retention, and very low fertility in their quartzose sands and hydromorphic podzols. Outcrops without vegetation also occur.

Fundão’s coastline is ideal for fishing and diving due to natural reefs. Praia Grande, one of the region’s most visited resorts during summer, has shallow, calm waters. At the mouth of the Reis Magos River, its estuary and a mangrove area are located. Less frequented by tourists and with fine sands, Enseada das Garças features restinga vegetation, while Praia do Rio Preto, on the border with Aracruz, hosts Atlantic Forest reserves.

The Reis Magos River originates in Santa Teresa, crosses Fundão’s seat as the Fundão River, and empties between Praia Grande and Nova Almeida, flowing from west to east. Its main tributaries are the Carneiro, Timbuí, and Piabas rivers. In the lower lands of the Reis Magos River Basin, rice and bean cultivation is practiced, alongside coffee in other areas. Waterway transport is limited to small boats due to siltation.

=== Climate ===
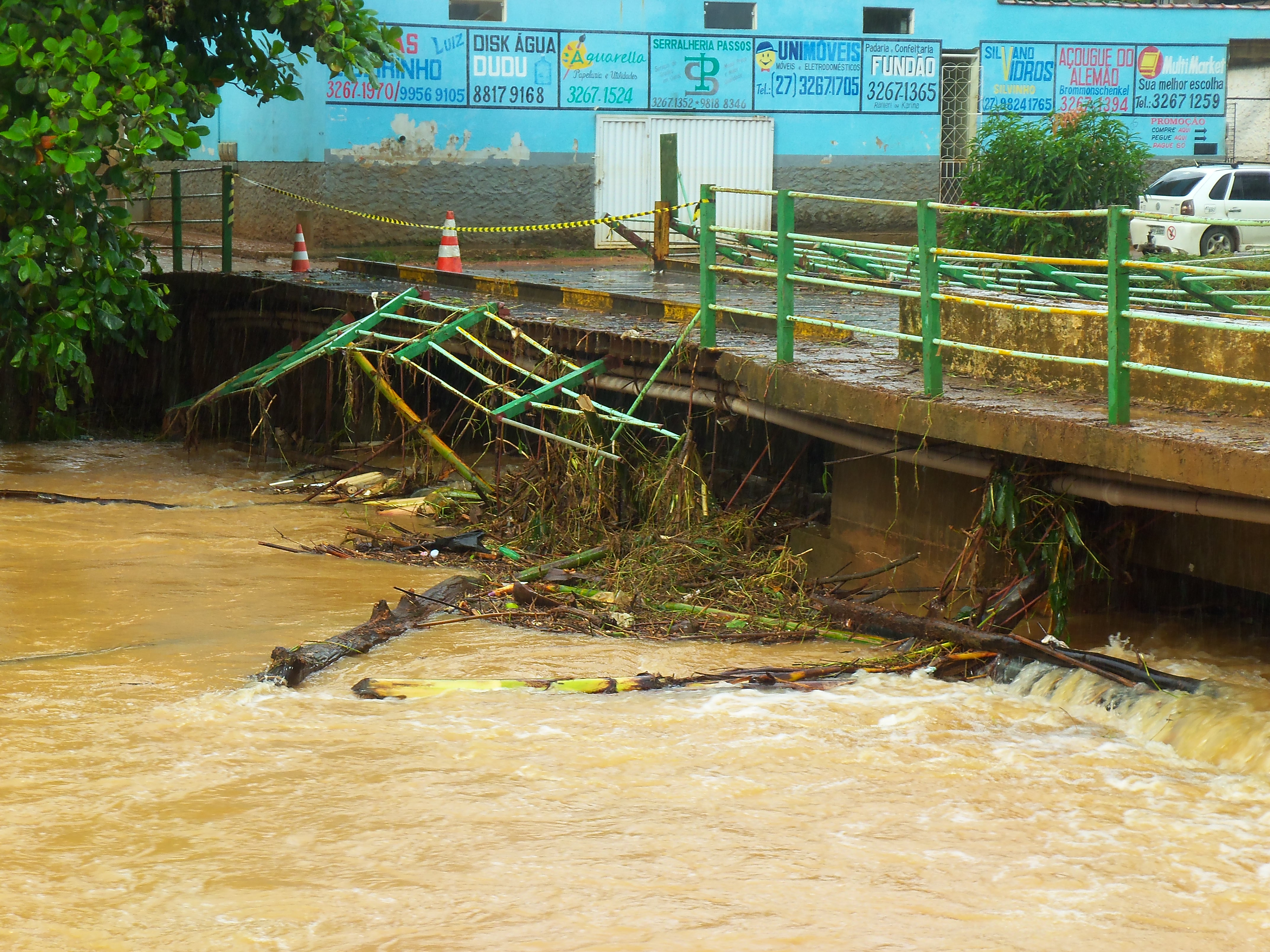
Flood in Fundão, resulting from heavy rains in January 2012.

Fundão’s climate is tropical wet and dry (type Aw according to the Köppen climate classification), with reduced rainfall in winter and an average annual temperature of 23.2 °C (73.8 °F), characterized by dry, mild winters and rainy summers with high temperatures. The warmest month, February, has an average temperature of 25.7 °C (78.3 °F), with an average high of 30.4 °C (86.7 °F) and a low of 21.1 °C (70.0 °F). The coldest month, July, averages 20.6 °C (69.1 °F), with highs of 25.1 °C (77.2 °F) and lows of 16.5 °C (61.7 °F).

The average annual precipitation is 1,200 millimetres (47 in), with the driest month receiving 52 millimetres (2.0 in). The rainiest month averages 277 millimetres (10.9 in). During the rainy season, floods and landslides are common in some areas. The highest recorded temperature was 39 °C (102 °F), and the lowest was 7 °C (45 °F).

Climate data for Fundão
Month	Jan	Feb	Mar	Apr	May	Jun	Jul	Aug	Sep	Oct	Nov	Dec	Year
Mean daily maximum °C (°F)	29.9 (85.8)	30.4 (86.7)	29.9 (85.8)	28.4 (83.1)	26.9 (80.4)	26.0 (78.8)	25.1 (77.2)	26.0 (78.8)	26.5 (79.7)	27.0 (80.6)	27.7 (81.9)	28.7 (83.7)	27.7 (81.9)
Mean daily minimum °C (°F)	21.8 (71.2)	21.1 (70.0)	21.6 (70.9)	20.3 (68.5)	18.6 (65.5)	17.4 (63.3)	16.5 (61.7)	16.9 (62.4)	18.0 (64.4)	19.1 (66.4)	20.2 (68.4)	21.1 (70.0)	19.4 (66.9)
Source: Inventário da oferta turística 1998 - Fundão - Sebrae-ES

=== Ecology and environment ===
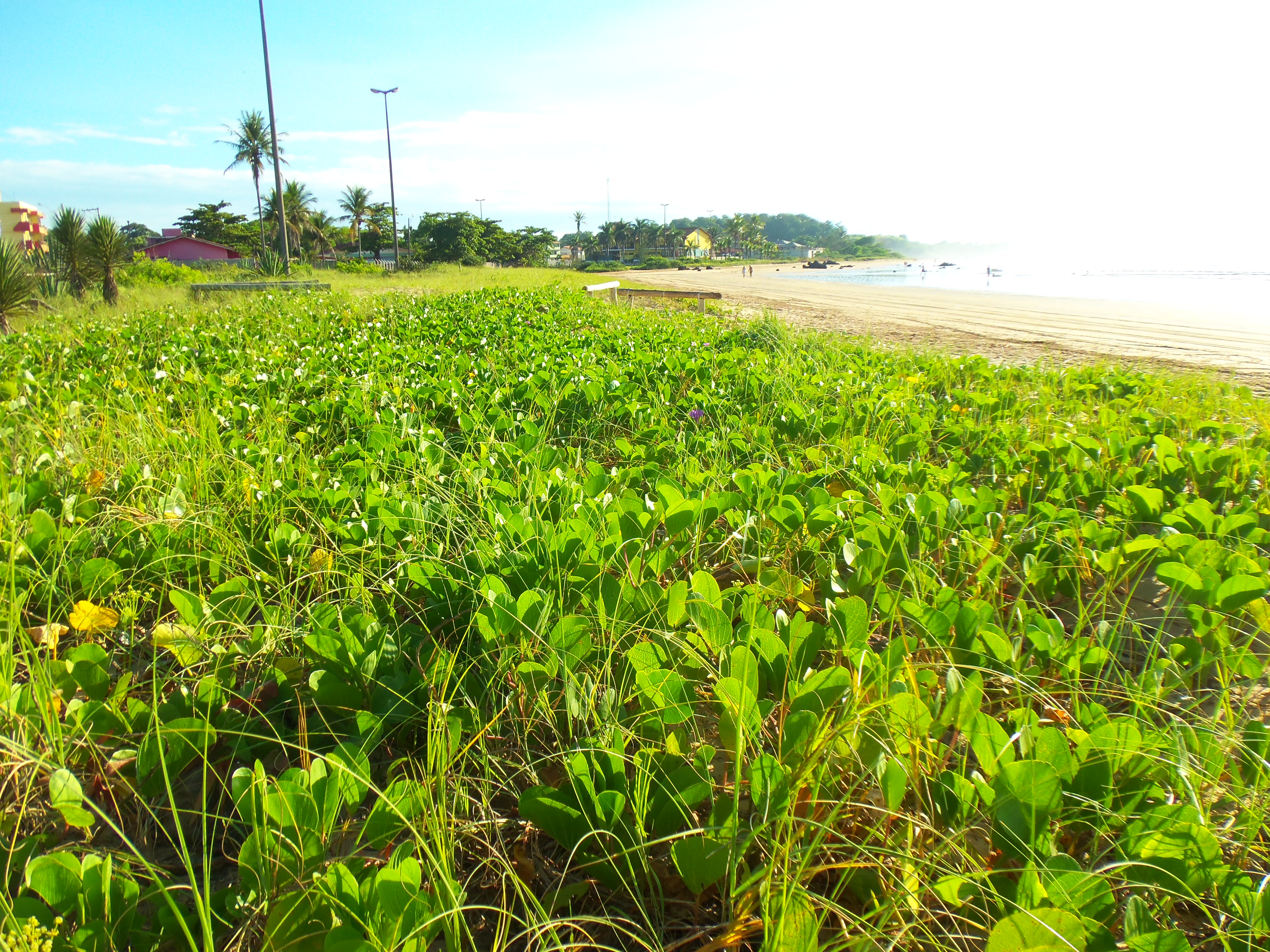
Restinga vegetation in Praia Grande.

Much of Fundão’s Atlantic Forest has been replaced by agricultural and livestock areas. Common in the coastal plain are mangroves along the Reis Magos River and restinga along the coast. Native riverbank vegetation has been substituted with pastures and residential areas, causing erosion.

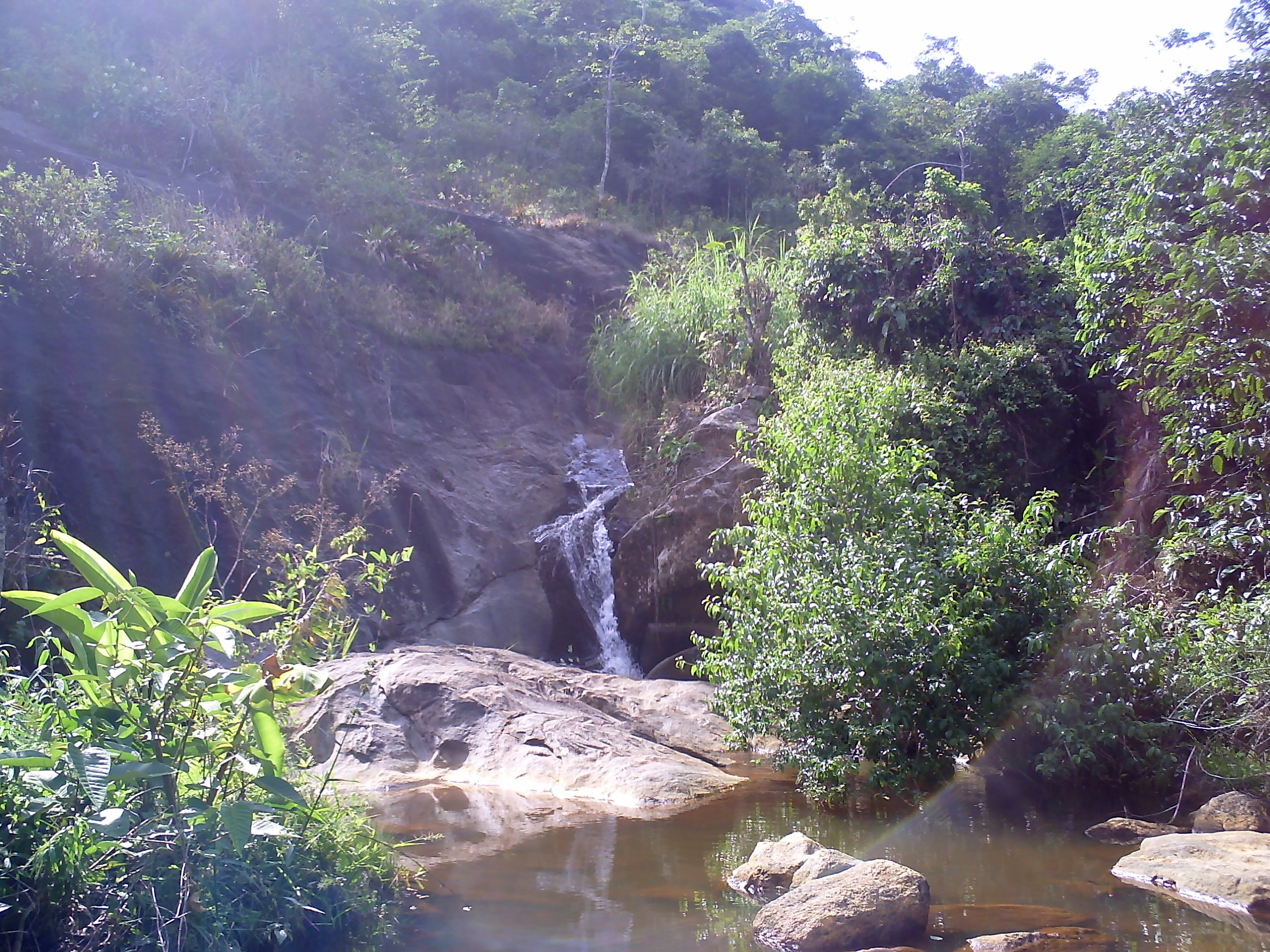
Goiapaba-Açu Environmental Protection Area.

The municipality’s fauna is typical of the Atlantic Forest, including spiders, crabs, butterflies, and dragonflies among invertebrates; snakes, tortoises, and lizards among reptiles; frogs and toads among amphibians; parakeets, pigeons, thrushes, tanagers, and toucans among birds; and river otters, capybaras, otters, and marmosets among mammals.

To preserve Fundão’s environment, the Goiapaba-Açu Municipal Park was established in 1991, and in 1994, the Goiapaba-Açu Environmental Protection Area (APA) was created, spanning Fundão and Santa Teresa around the municipal park, managed by the Espírito Santo Institute of Environment and Water Resources (Iema). The APA hosts 133 bird species, including the robust woodpecker (Campephilus robustus) and the bare-throated bellbird (Procnias nudicollis). Notable plant species in the region include bromeliads, orchids, cinnamon, courbaril, sucupira, and pau-pereira. Amphibians are also prominent in Goiapaba-Açu’s fauna.

The Augusto Ruschi Forest Garden, the first model of forest gardens proposed by Espírito Santo at Eco-92, is located next to the Josel de Oliveira Sports Gymnasium. Spanning 4.5 hectares of reforested pastures, it includes a nursery for seedlings of cedar, cherry, jequitibá, sucupira, peroba, landscaping species, and fruit trees such as avocado, blackberry, coffee, yellow mombin, cashew, jackfruit, rose apple, Malabar plum, mango, and tangerine.

== Demographics ==
Population growth of Fundão
Year	Population
1872	2,196
1900	4,352
1920	8,217
1940	8,630
1950	8,096
1960	7,655
1970	8,170
1980	9,215
1991	10,204
2000	13,009
2010	17,028
2022	18,014

In 2022, the municipality’s population was recorded by the Brazilian Institute of Geography and Statistics (IBGE) as 18,014 inhabitants, with a population density of 62.4 inhabitants per square kilometre (162/sq mi). According to the 2010 census, 8,489 inhabitants were men and 8,536 were women, with 14,378 living in the urban area and 2,647 in the rural area.

Fundão’s Municipal Human Development Index (HDI-M) is considered high by the United Nations Development Programme (UNDP). In 2010, it was 0.718. For education, the index is 0.623; for longevity, 0.839; and for income, 0.708. The city’s HDI-M is below the national average (0.727) according to the UNDP. The per capita gross domestic product (GDP) in 2018 was 22,597.47 reais.

The Gini coefficient, which measures social inequality, is 0.49, where 1.00 is the worst and 0.00 is the best. The poverty incidence, as measured by the IBGE, is 32.52%, with a lower limit of 27.31%, an upper limit of 37.74%, and a subjective poverty incidence of 28.41%.

In 2010, Fundão’s population consisted of 9,016 mixed-race individuals (52.96%), 6,488 whites (38.11%), 1,426 blacks (8.38%), 75 Asians (0.44%), and 20 indigenous people (0.12%).

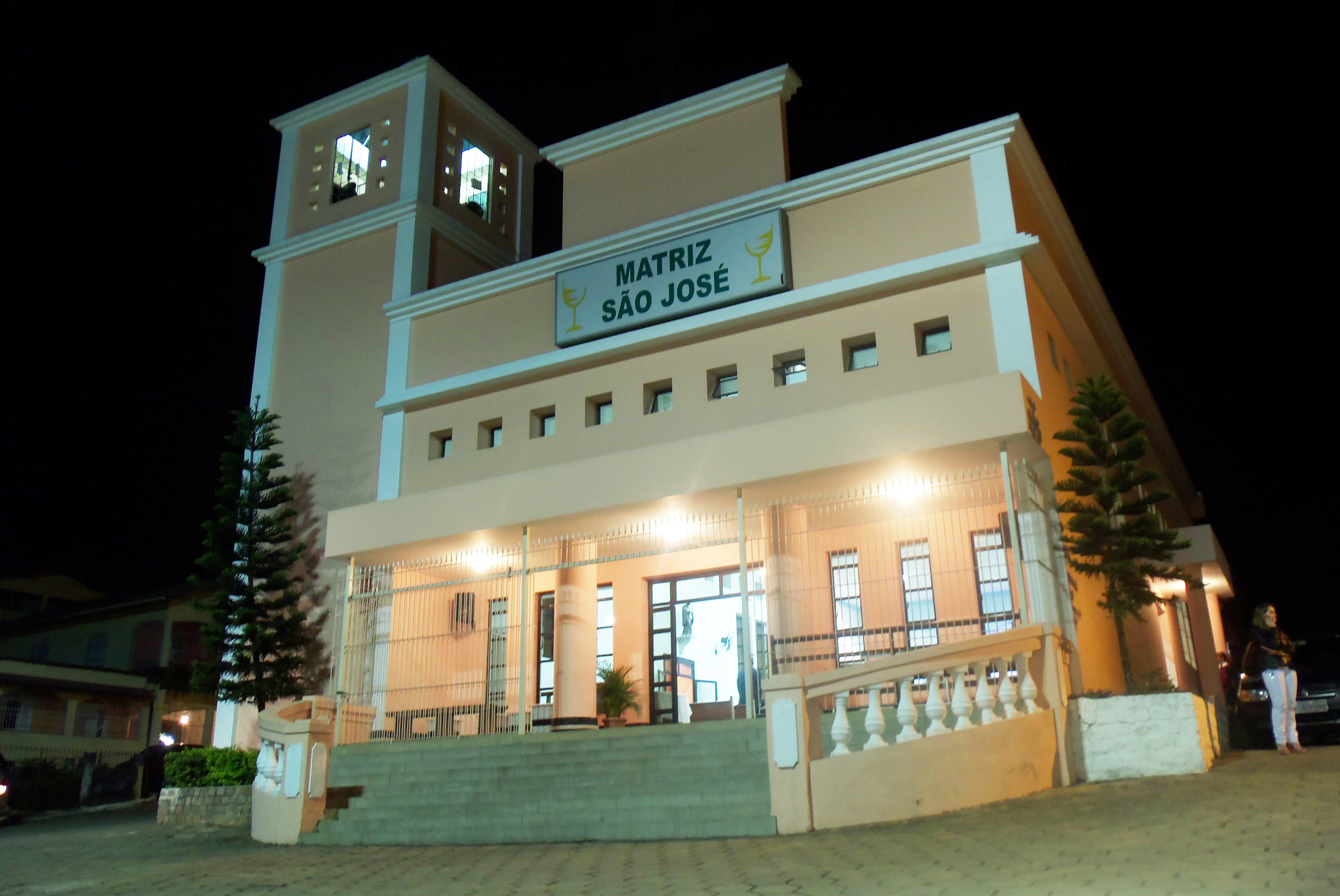
São José Parish Church.

=== Religion ===
While developed within a predominantly Catholic social framework, Fundão today is home to various Protestant denominations. The city is home to diverse Protestant or reformed faiths, with the Assemblies of God being the largest Christian denomination in the municipality.

According to the 2010 census conducted by the Brazilian Institute of Geography and Statistics, the population of Fundão is composed of: Catholics (61.69%), Evangelicals (28.03%), people with no religion (6.49%), Spiritists (1.22%), and 0.52% are divided among other religions.

== Politics ==
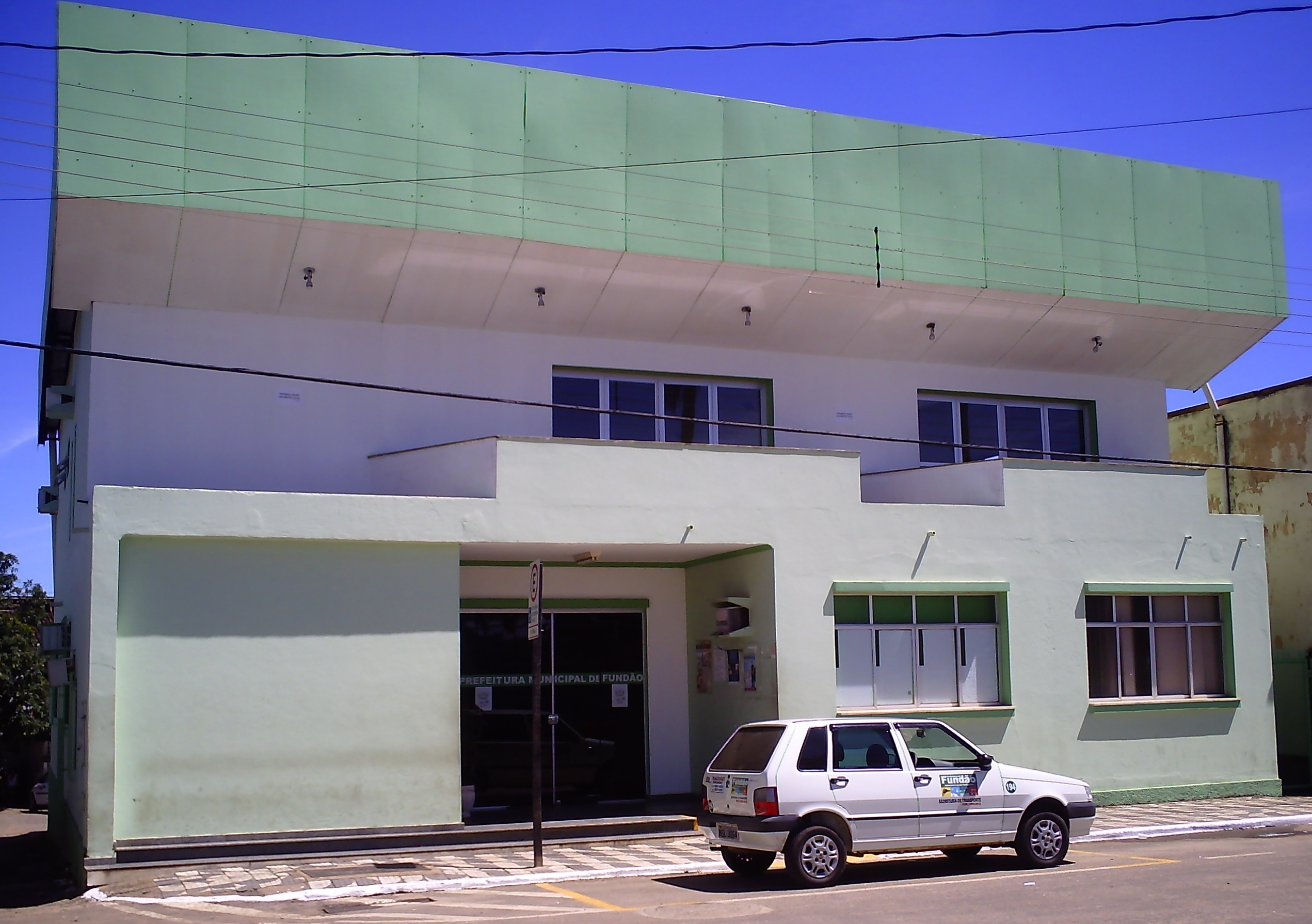
Headquarters of the city hall and the Fundão City Council.

Under the 1988 Constitution, municipal administration is carried out by the executive branch and the legislative branch.

The first representative of the executive branch and mayor of the municipality was Hermínio Jorge de Castro, appointed shortly after the municipality’s emancipation. In recent years, the position was temporarily held from 1 January – 26 October 2017, by Eleazar Ferreira Lopes (then affiliated with PCdoB), who was on leave from the presidency of the City Council. Following a supplementary mayoral election on 1 October 2017, the new mayor, Pretinho Nunes (PDT), was sworn in on 27 October of the same year. Since 1 January 2021, the municipality has been governed by Gilmar de Souza Borges, who has previously served as mayor on three other occasions.

The legislative branch consists of the municipal chamber, composed of eleven councilors elected for four-year terms (in accordance with Article 29 of the Constitution) and is structured as follows: two seats for Cidadania; two for Podemos; two for the Brazilian Socialist Party (PSB); two for the Republicans; one for Patriota; one for the Democratic Labour Party (PDT); and one for the Social Democratic Party (PSD). The council is responsible for drafting and voting on fundamental laws for the administration and the executive branch, particularly the participatory budget (Budget Guidelines Law).

The municipality of Fundão is governed by an organic law. It serves as the seat of the Fundão judicial district. According to the Espírito Santo Regional Electoral Court (TRE-ES), the municipality had 14,125 registered voters in May 2017.

== Subdivisions ==
Fundão is divided into three districts in addition to the municipal seat: Praia Grande, Timbuí, and Irundi. According to the 2010 census, the seat had 8,744 inhabitants; Praia Grande, 5,349; Timbuí, 2,400; and Irundi, 532. The Jones dos Santos Neves Institute suggests there are nine neighborhoods in the seat, six in Praia Grande, and one in Timbuí, totaling 16 across the municipality.

Districts of Fundão.

== Economy ==
Production of coffee, bananas, and tangerines (2013)
Product	Harvested area (hectares)	Production (tons)
Coffee	2,351	4,571
Bananas	115	1,905
Tangerines	22	374

The gross domestic product (GDP) of Fundão is distinguished by its industrial sector. According to 2018 data from the Brazilian Institute of Geography and Statistics (IBGE), the municipality recorded a GDP of R$475.925 million. The per capita GDP stood at R$22,597.47.

=== Primary sector ===
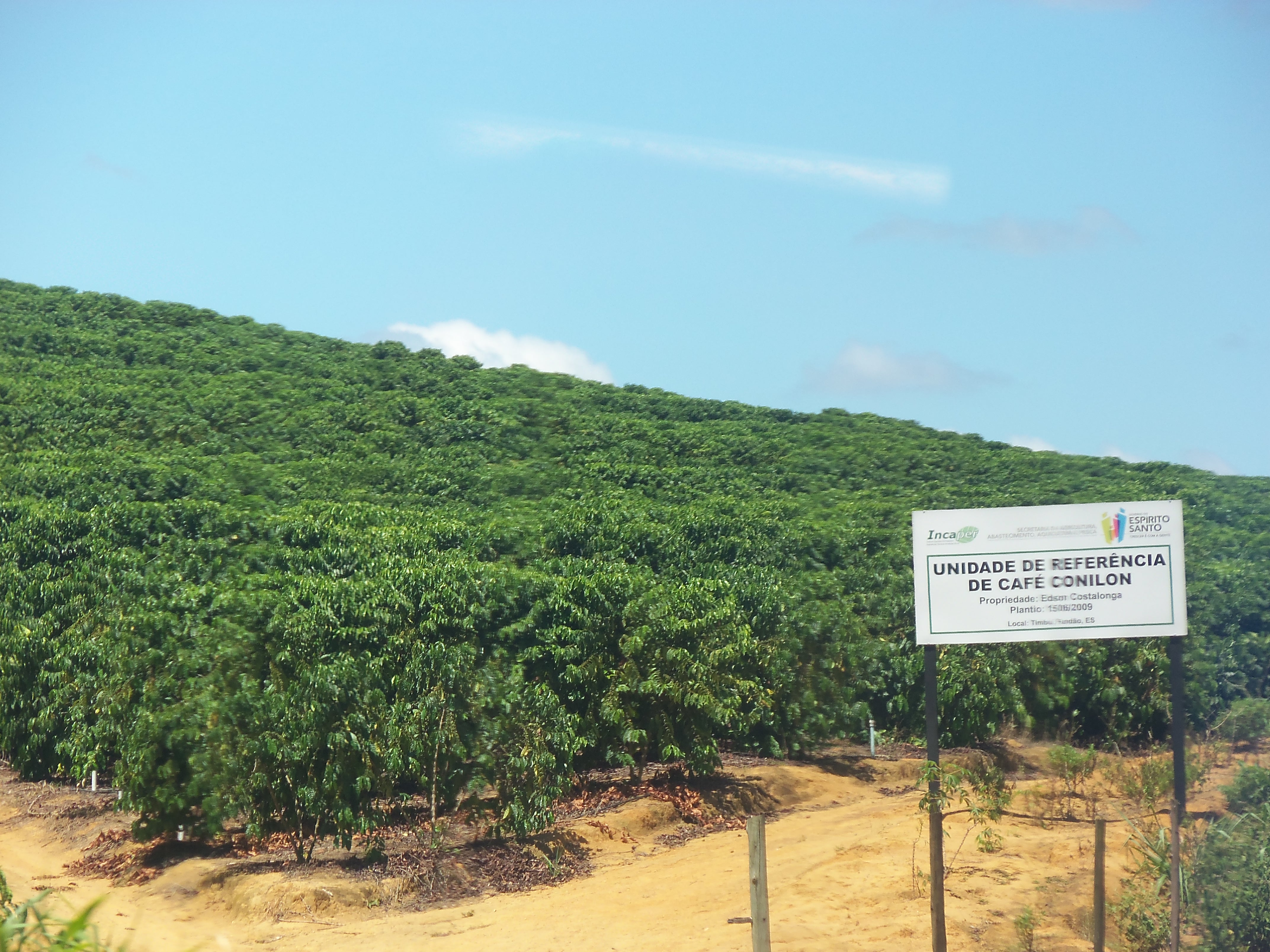
A reference unit for conilon coffee in Timbuí.

Agriculture and livestock form the sector with the smallest contribution to Fundão’s economy. Out of the city’s total GDP, R$28.954 million comes from the gross value added by agriculture and livestock. Despite its lower GDP contribution, Fundão’s economy is rooted in agriculture, particularly coffee production. According to 2015 IBGE data, the municipality maintained a herd of 11,617 cattle, 639 pigs, 126 sheep, 305 horses, 13 goats, 7,400 poultry (including 3,700 hens), and 3,050 quails. In 2015, the city produced 3.468 million liters of milk from 2,141 cows, alongside 56,000 dozen chicken eggs, 46,000 dozen quail eggs, and 90,000 kilograms of honey. Temporary crops primarily include cassava (1,200 tons), sugarcane (1,080 tons), and watermelon (36 tons). Permanent crops mainly consist of coffee (4,571 tons), bananas (1,905 tons), and tangerines (374 tons).

According to the 2017 Agricultural Census, of the 453 rural establishments, 306 focused on permanent crops, 22 on temporary crops, 102 on livestock and other animal husbandry, 3 on forestry (planted forests), and 2 on aquaculture. The municipality’s livestock sector is mixed (for both meat and dairy), with predominance in the coastal region.

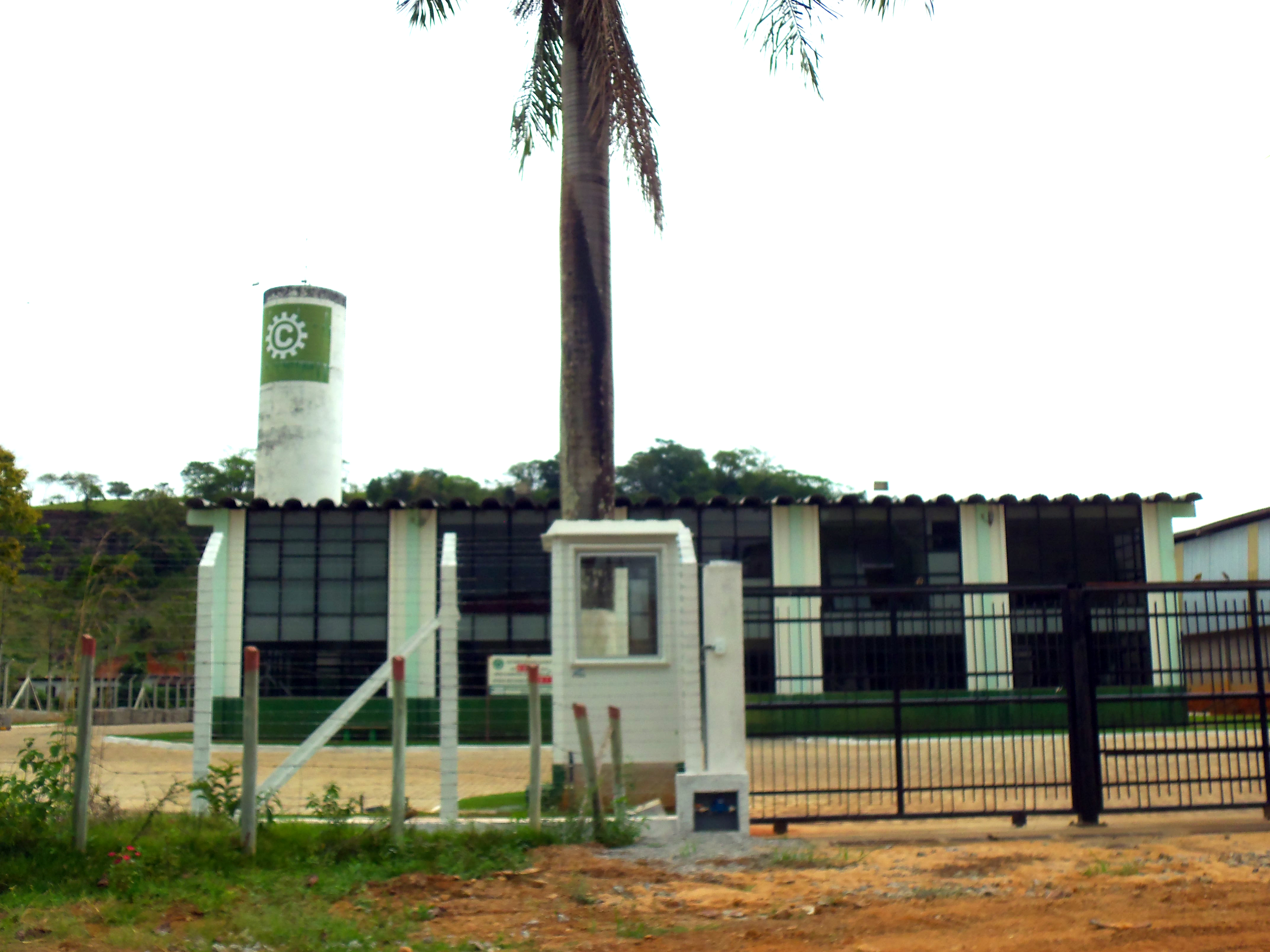
The Columbia Tecnologia factory produces equipment for oil exploration.

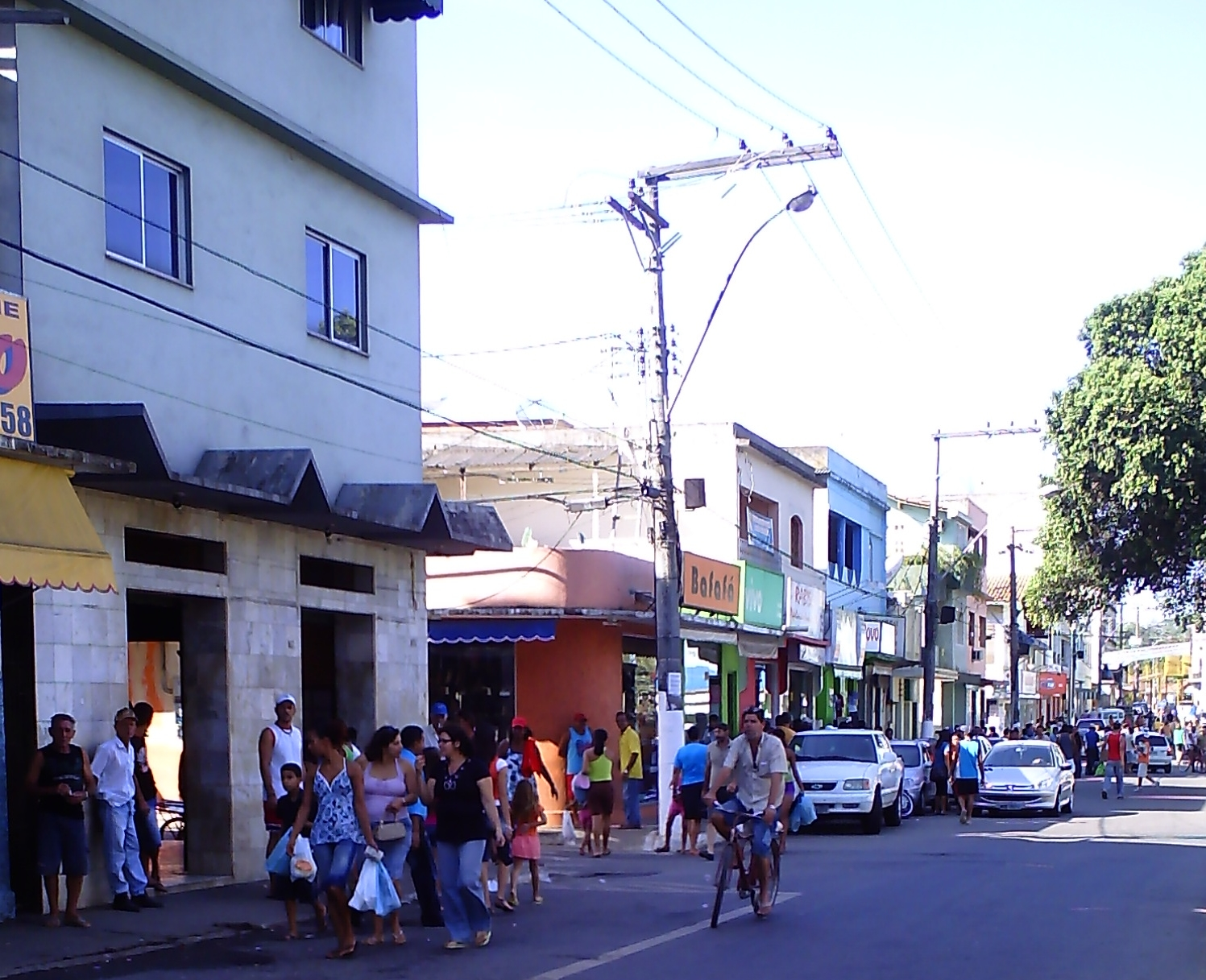
Presidente Vargas Street in downtown Fundão.

=== Secondary sector ===
R$148.277 million of the municipal GDP comes from the gross value added by industry (secondary sector), currently the largest contributor to Fundão’s GDP. Since 2004, this figure has grown due to royalties from petroleum.

=== Tertiary sector ===
R$261.537 million of the municipal GDP is generated by services (tertiary sector). According to the federal government’s Business Map, as of August 2020, the city had 2,453 companies. The 2018 Annual Social Information Report (RAIS) indicated that the municipality employed 3,041 people, with 1,388 in small businesses, 889 in medium-sized businesses, none in large companies, and 764 in public administration. According to the Espírito Santo Institute for Educational and Industrial Development (Ideies), as of 2021, the average monthly salary in the municipality was R$1,760.58.

== Urban infrastructure ==
=== Healthcare ===
In 2012, the municipality had five healthcare facilities, all municipally operated, offering six beds for inpatient care. The city also provides outpatient services, including basic medical specialties and dental care, through the Unified Health System (SUS). Fundão has Primary Healthcare Units and a Diagnostic and Therapy Support Service Unit. As As of December 2012, Fundão had 50 doctors, six dentists, four physiotherapists, three speech therapists, four pharmacists, three psychologists, five nursing assistants, ten nurses, and 30 nursing technicians, totaling 115 healthcare professionals. The municipality is part of the Vitória Regional Health District. In 2010, there were 5,278 women of childbearing age (10 to 49 years). In 2008, 220 live births were recorded, with 18.6% of mothers under 20 years old. Without hospitals, the city relies on the Dr. César Agostini Mixed Healthcare Unit, managed by the municipality.

=== Education ===
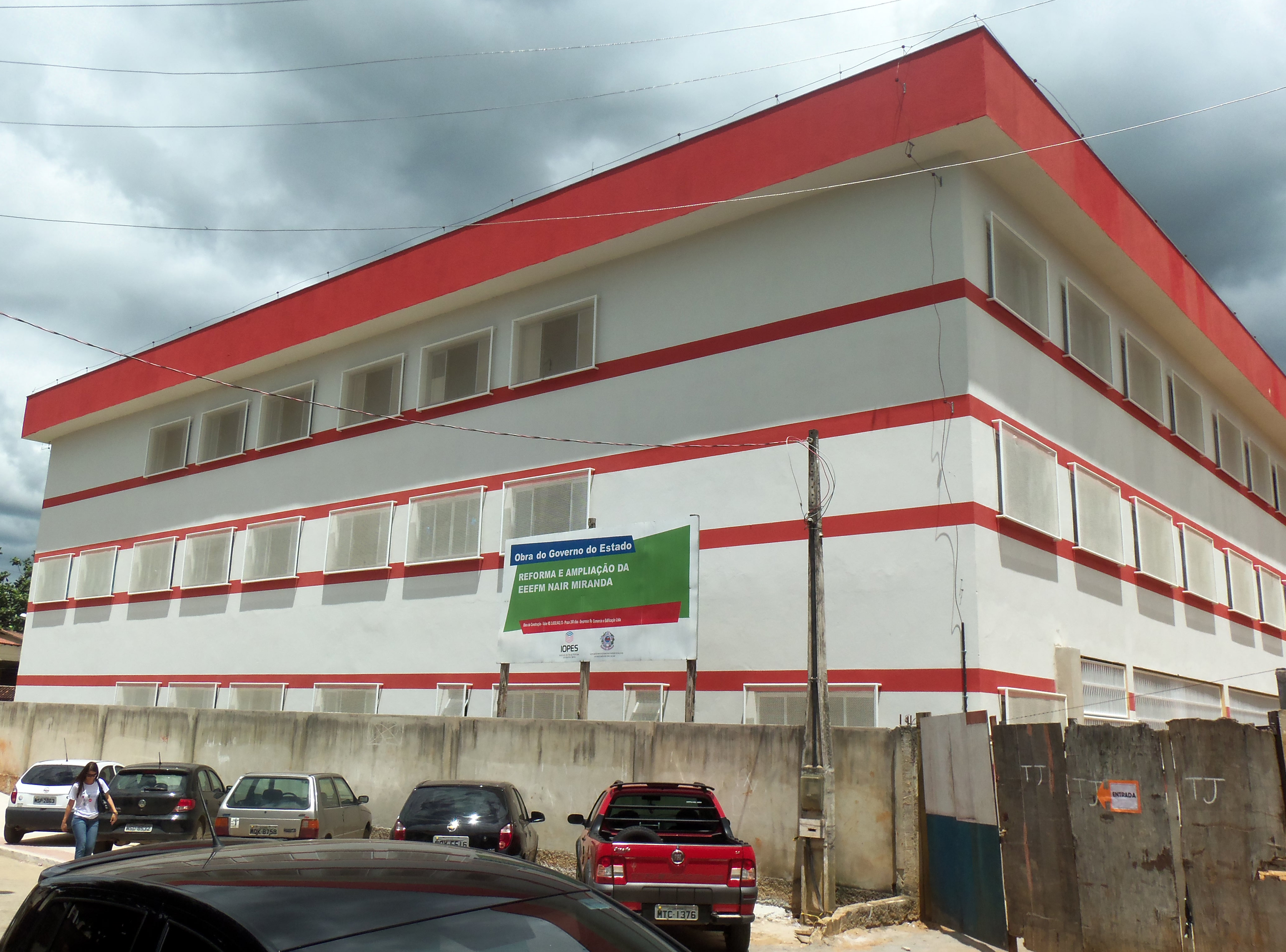
Nair Miranda State Elementary and Secondary School.

In 2012, the municipality recorded approximately 3,542 enrollments, 239 teachers, and 16 public schools, with no federal or private schools. According to 2010 census data, the illiteracy rate among individuals over 15 years was 9.5%; for those aged 15 to 24, 1.2%; for those aged 25 to 59, 8.0%; and for those over 60, 27.1%.

Education in Fundão by numbers
Level	Enrollments	Teachers	Schools (Total)
Early childhood education	448	22	7
Primary education	2,670	179	8
Secondary education	424	38	1

=== Public safety ===
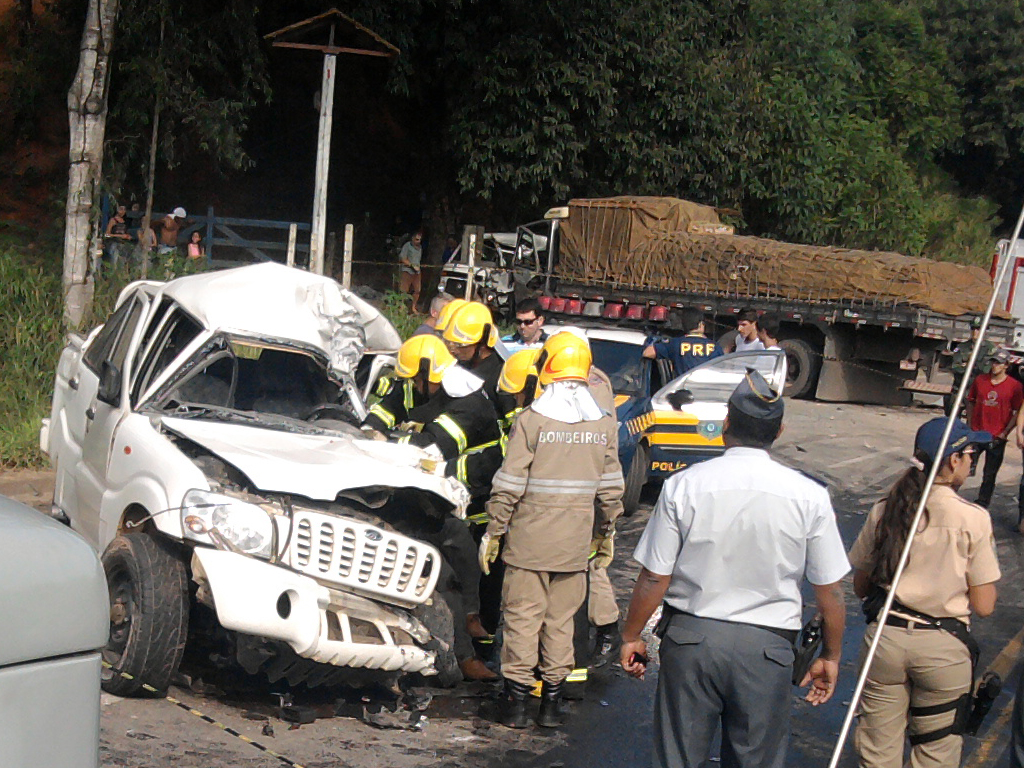
Accident on BR-101 in Fundão in 2011, resulting in five deaths.

As in many growing Brazilian municipalities, crime poses a challenge in Fundão. In 2012, there were four firearm homicides, yielding a firearm homicide rate of 22.7 per 100,000 inhabitants. While such figures may be less reliable in smaller cities, Fundão neighbors Serra, which, with over 300,000 residents, recorded a 2010 homicide rate of 99.9 per 100,000, the third highest in Brazil for cities of its size. Moreover, the Greater Vitória metropolitan area, including Fundão, ranked as the 15th most violent region globally in 2014 for areas with over 300,000 inhabitants. In April 2013, Fundão’s police force comprised six military police officers, with two assigned to each urbanized district, a number deemed insufficient by the president of the Timbuí Residents’ Association.

The traffic accident mortality rate, which stood at 46.4 per 100,000 inhabitants in 2006, rose to 141.0 in 2010 and fell to 57.7 in 2011. From 2001 to 2010, the average was 67.8. A 2012 Sangari Institute study ranked Fundão fourth in Brazil and first in Espírito Santo for traffic deaths per capita in 2010 among municipalities with over 15,000 residents. With a population of 17,025, 24 people died on Fundão’s roads, resulting in a rate of 141.0 deaths per 100,000 inhabitants. On federal highways, a hilly section of BR-101 in the rural area near Fundão’s seat was among the two deadliest in Espírito Santo, with eight deaths in 2011. In 2012, the BR-101 stretch between Fundão and Ibiraçu ranked 12th for accidents on the highway, with 112 incidents. In the seat area, hazardous curves, narrow bridges, and roadside fruit stalls along BR-101 worsen traffic conditions in Espírito Santo.

=== Services and communications ===
Water supply and sewage collection across the city are managed by the Espírito Santo Sanitation Company (Cesan). Electricity distribution in Fundão is handled by EDP Escelsa, serving multiple municipalities in Espírito Santo. Dial-up and broadband (ADSL) internet services are offered by various free and paid internet service providers. Mobile phone services are provided by multiple operators. Fundão’s area code (DDD) is 27, and its postal code (CEP) is 29185-000. Fundão is home to Rádio Mais 98.5 FM.

=== Transportation ===
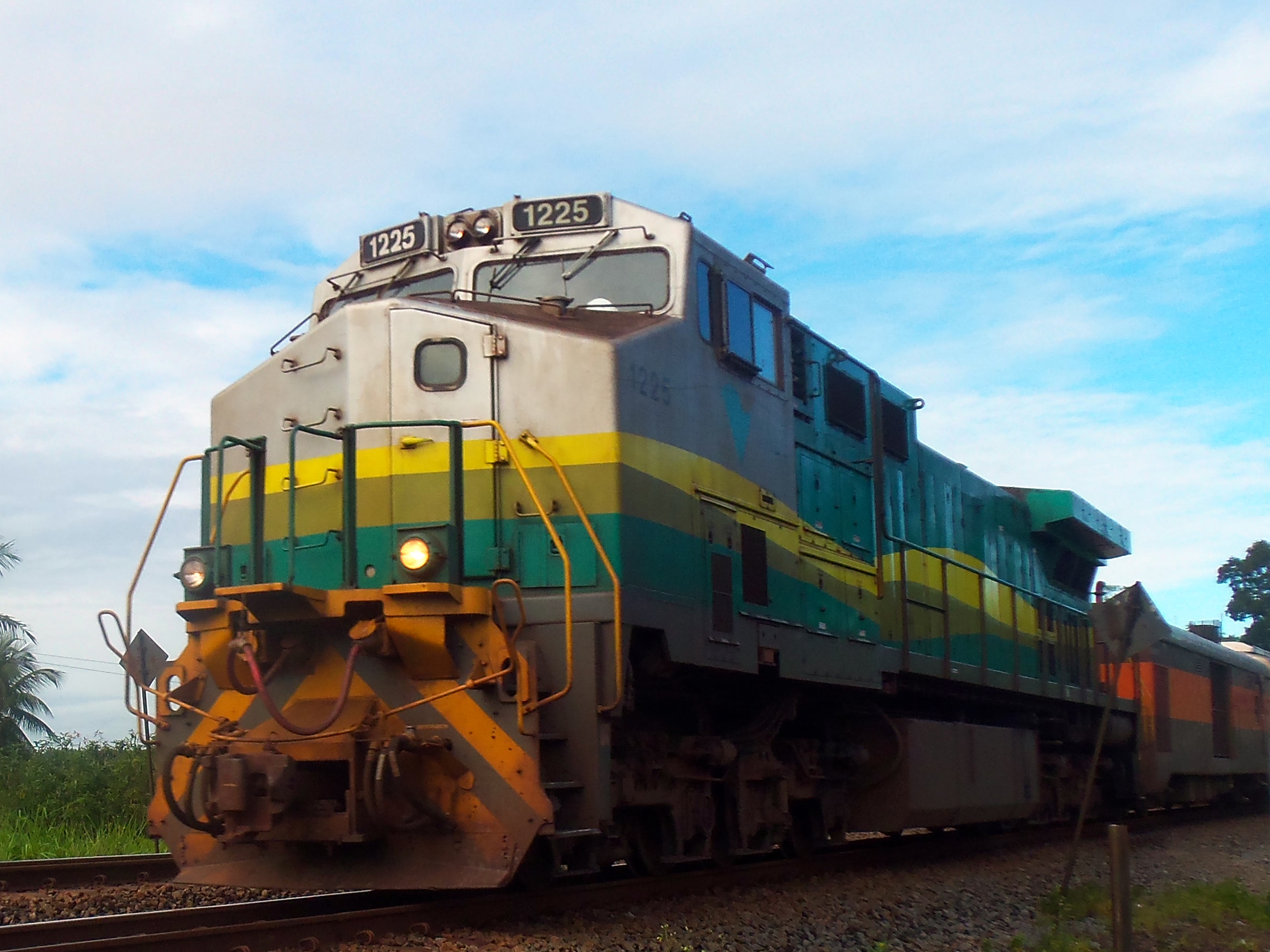
Passenger train of the Vitória-Minas Railway passing through downtown Fundão.

Fundão is served by the Vitória-Minas Railway, via the Fundão Station, inaugurated on 15 May 1905, with daily passenger and cargo trains to Belo Horizonte and Vitória. The railway is vital for the city and its residents, offering a safer and more affordable alternative to road transport. In the Timbuí district, the Timbuí Station operated from 29 December 1904, until at least the 1960s.

By road, Fundão is accessible via BR-101, connecting the seat to Serra and Ibiraçu; ES-010, linking Praia Grande to Santa Cruz and Nova Almeida; ES-124, connecting Praia Grande to Santa Rosa (Aracruz); ES-261, linking the seat to Santa Teresa and Santa Rosa; and ES-264, connecting Timbuí to Santa Leopoldina and Nova Almeida.

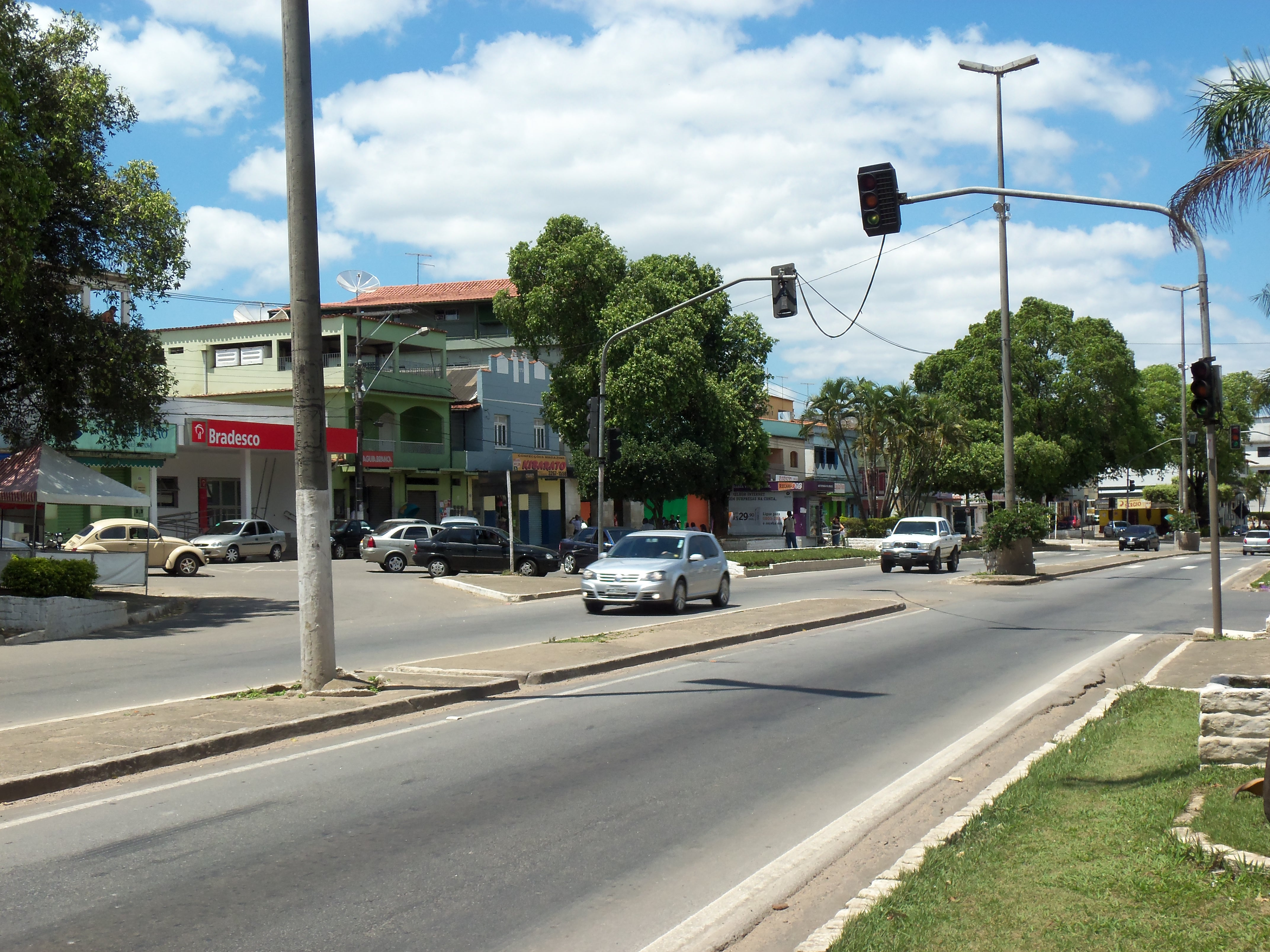
BR-101 interchange in downtown Fundão.

The BR-101 section through Fundão becomes problematic during high-traffic periods, such as holidays, due to its intersection and traffic lights in the city center. These conditions can cause congestion stretching up to 10 kilometers, disrupting local traffic.

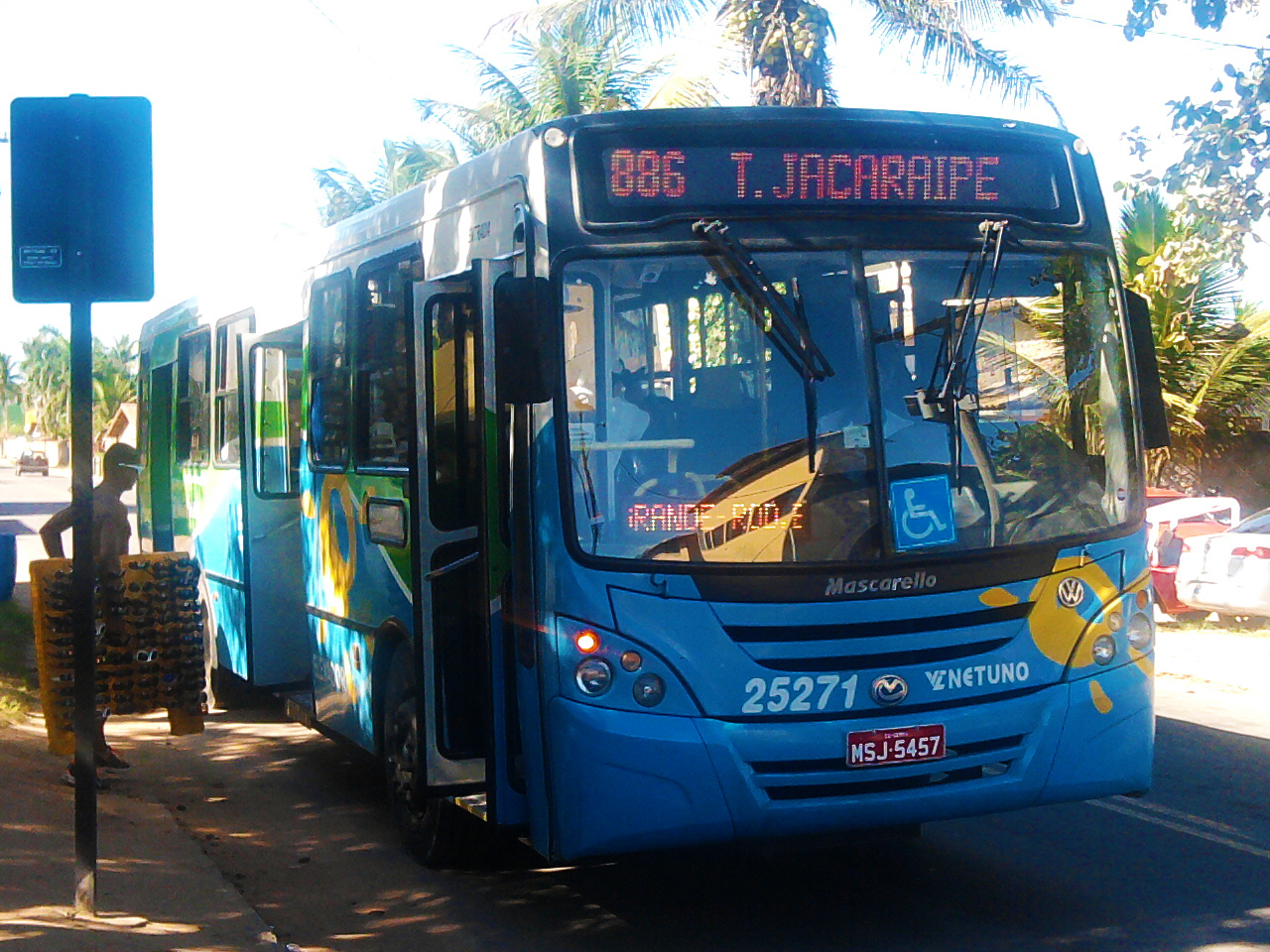
Transcol bus on Line 886 along ES-010 in Praia Grande, heading toward Jacaraípe.

Intermunicipal public transport is provided by the Transcol system, with lines 854 and 886 connecting Praia Grande and Direção to the Jacaraípe Terminal, and line 888 linking Timbuí to the Laranjeiras Terminal. Selective transport is also available via line 1805, connecting Praia Grande to Vitória’s bus terminal. In 2012, a law established municipal public transport lines between Fundão and Timbuí, and between Timbuí and Praia Grande via Fundão. Fundão is served by the Fundão Bus Station, offering routes to Vitória, Santa Teresa, northern and northwestern Espírito Santo, eastern Minas Gerais, and southern Bahia, and the Praia Grande Bus Station, with routes to Vitória and Rio de Janeiro.

The municipal vehicle fleet in 2012 totaled 6,601 vehicles, including 3,290 cars, 362 trucks, 113 tractor-trailers, 672 pickup trucks, 279 vans, 55 minibuses, 1,291 motorcycles, 215 scooters, 43 buses, 34 wheeled tractors, 21 utility vehicles, and 226 other types of vehicles.

== Culture ==
Among the recreational venues in Fundão are the Expedicionários Square, located in Downtown, and various clubs. The Fundão Horse Club organizes horseback rides; the Tropical Campestre Club hosts sports and recreational facilities; and the Maracaiá Club, owned by the Comercial Futebol Clube, serves as a downtown nightclub operating on weekend nights with a capacity for 200 people. Additionally, forró dances are held on weekends at Cabana do Matoso in the Encruzo community.

=== Arts ===
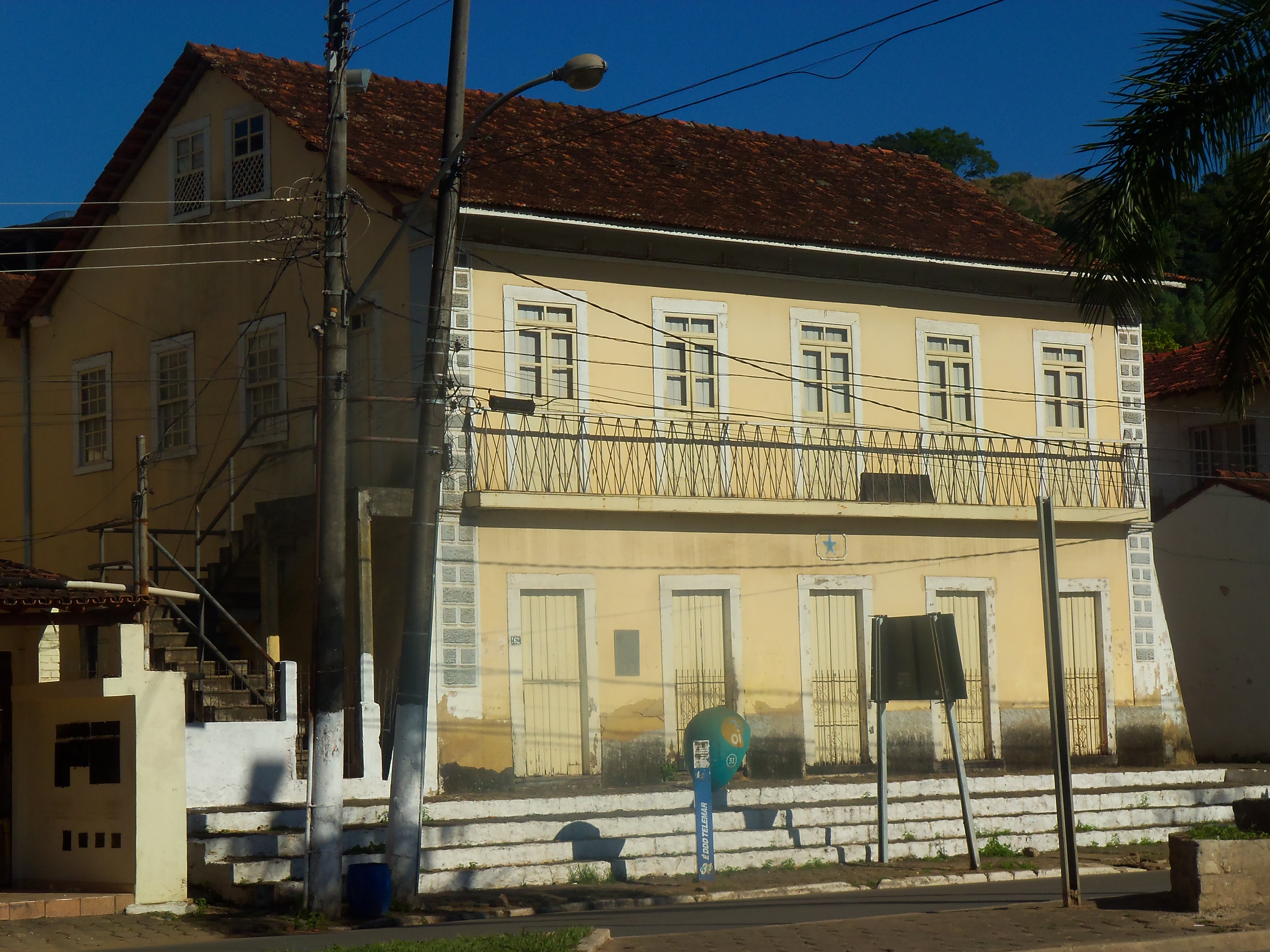
Fundão Culture House.

Fundão has architectural structures dating back to the coffee cycle. In the seat, the former Agostini family residence, now the Fundão Culture House, was designated a cultural heritage site of Espírito Santo in 1986. The two-story building, constructed in 1882 on the Taquaraçu farm by Cândido Vieira, was purchased at auction by the Agostini family in the early 20th century and used by the Angelo Agostini e Cia. coffee export company, managed by merchant and banking representative Hipólito Agostini. The building was connected by telephone to the Agostini farm in the rural area. At the time, the ground floor served as a commercial space, while the upper floor was a residence. In 1925, it was the home of physician and politician César Agostini. Until the 1970s, the family used the ground floor as an office. Later, the building was acquired by the municipal government. It was restored in 1985 and 1986 to house a craft shop, museum, and cultural event space, with its exterior paved with stones and a new external staircase built.

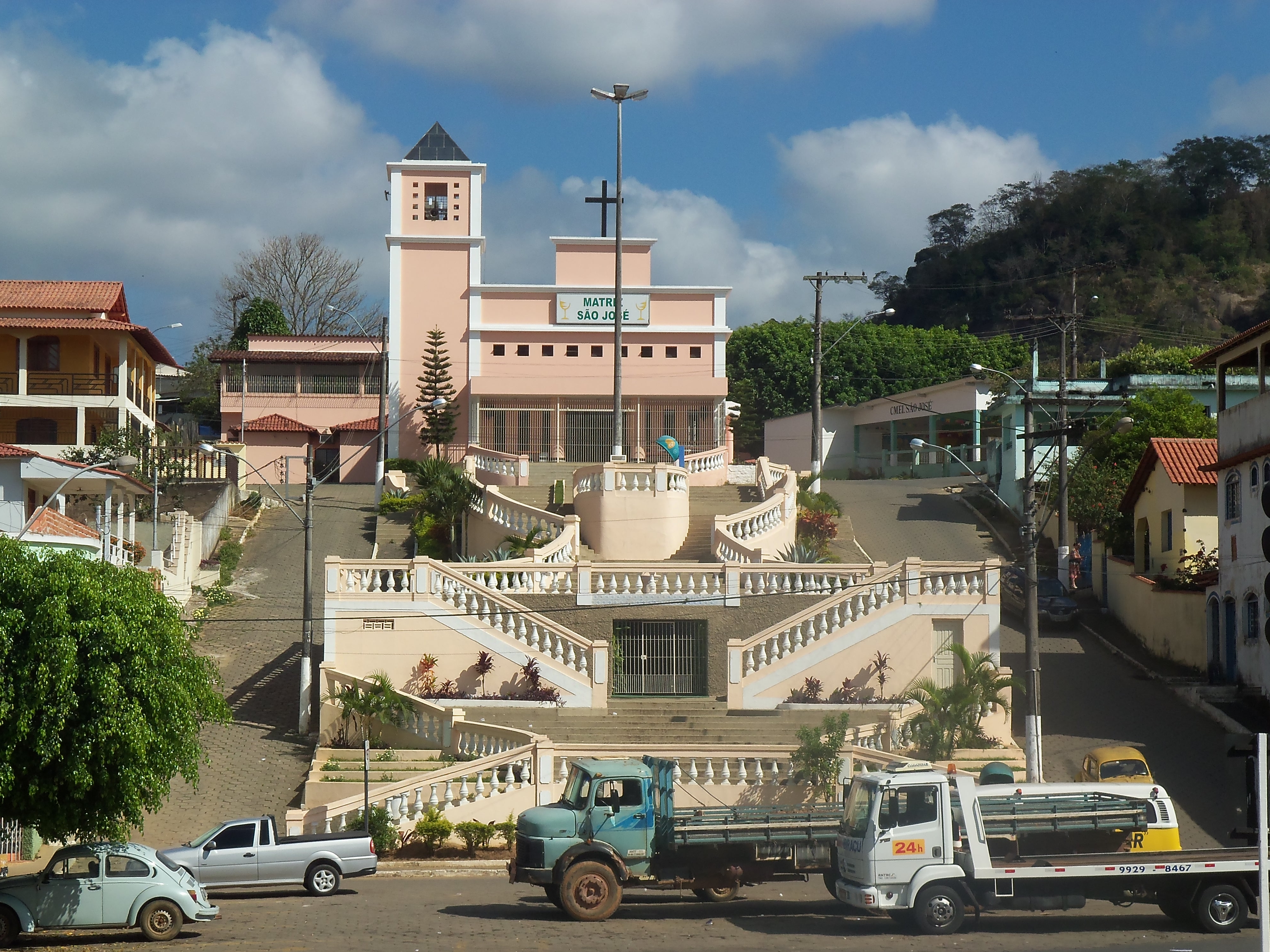
Chrysantho de Jesus Rocha Staircase, in front of the São José Parish Church.

Also part of the municipality’s civil architecture is the former Augusto Agostini farm, now the Pé de Serra ranch in Três Barras, which houses a late 19th-century mansion used for coffee trading before becoming a residence. From this location, one can view and access the Goiapaba-Açu peak. Located in front of the Parish Church, the Chrysantho de Jesus Rocha Staircase, built in a neo-Baroque style resembling a chalice with a host, features gardens and a small grotto with saint statues. The staircase is used to raise the masts of Saint Benedict and Saint Sebastian by congo bands. It is named in honor of the father of Mariana’s archbishop and former president of the Episcopal Conference of Brazil, the Fundão native Geraldo Lyrio Rocha.

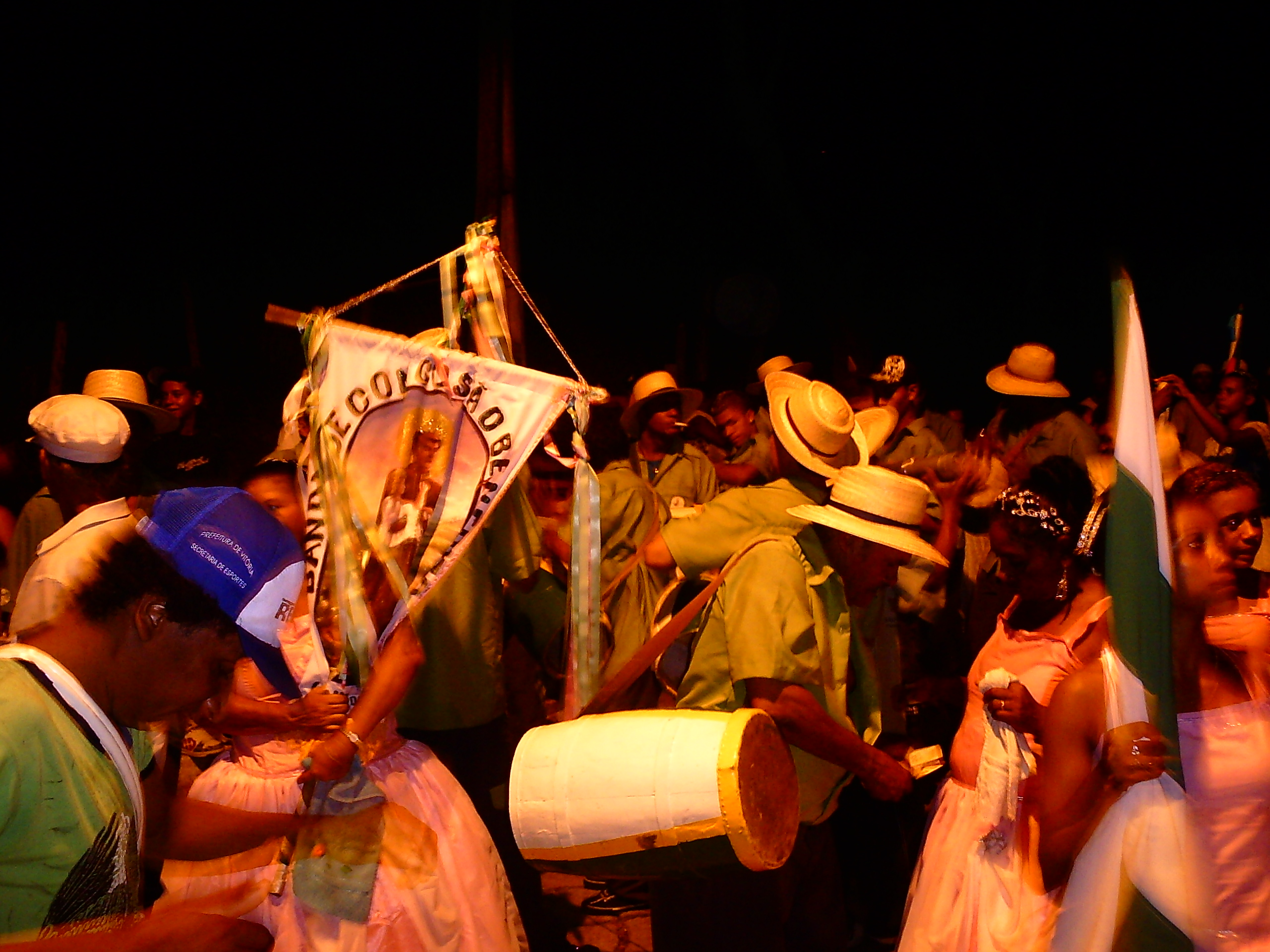
São Benedito Congo Band at the São Benedito and São Sebastião Festival in Fundão, 2010.

Examples of local religious architecture include:

- Our Lady of Victory Chapel: Built in 1878 in Irundi, with a view of Goiapaba-Açu. It has its own cemetery with about ten tombstones of former residents.
- Bom Jesus da Lapa Church: From the early 20th century, located in Irundi. Built on a rock, facing a former community.
- Our Lady of Penha Church: In Timbuí’s central square.
- São José Parish Church: Atop the Chrysantho de Jesus Rocha Staircase, significantly altered from its original structure. Most visited during the São Benedito festival.
- Santo Antônio Church: In the seat.

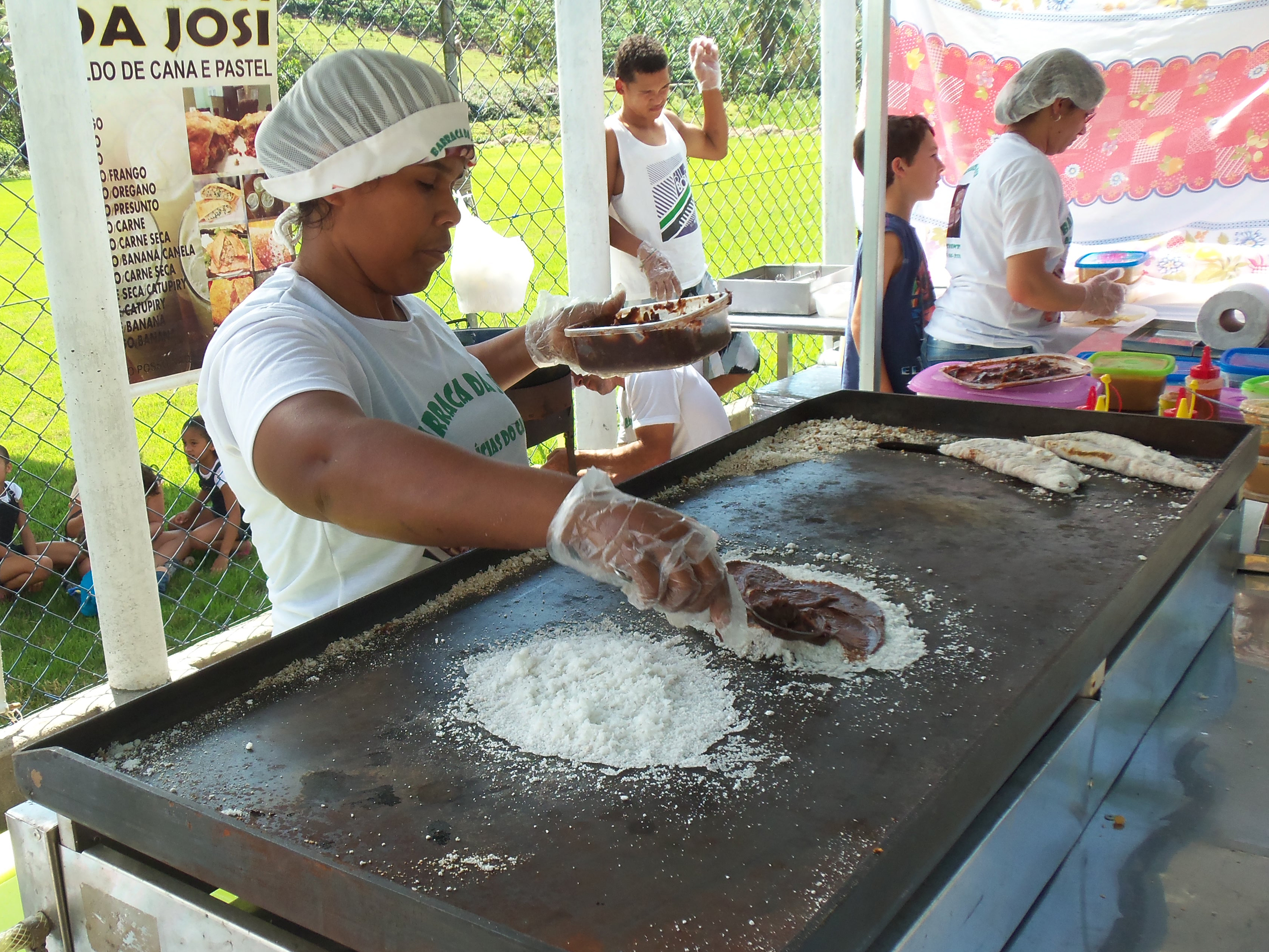
Tapioca production in the Encruzo community.

Local music and dance are represented by congo capixaba bands, which perform on festive days. Fundão’s bands include the São Benedito and São Sebastião Children’s Congo Band in Timbuí; the São Benedito and São Sebastião Congo Band in Campestre I; the Konfogo Cultural Congo Band in Downtown; and the São Sebastião and São Benedito Congo Band of Irundi and Piabas in Três Barras. Additionally, in 2013, gospel music was officially recognized as a cultural manifestation of the municipality.

Italian colonization contributed to local cuisine with polenta, jabuticaba wine, and milk liqueur. Moqueca is also consumed due to indigenous influence. The municipality is also known for homemade biscuits, crystallized sweets, tapioca (in the rural Encruzo community), cheeses, and requeijão. Fundão’s crafts include items made from southern cattail fibers, cane, wood, liana, coconut, and banana tree, as well as shells, fabric, porcelain, plaster, canvas, and glass, used for fabric and porcelain paintings, embroidery, jewelry, baskets, sieves, brooms, and decorated glassware. The municipality has a deactivated cinema.

=== Tourism ===
Fundão’s tourism is unique in Espírito Santo for offering both beach and mountain attractions. Accessible via the ES-010 highway, the coastline features natural reefs ideal for diving and fishing, compact sands, restinga, and chestnut trees. The main attraction is Praia Grande, also known as Joaripe, a five-kilometer beach with murky waters, frequented by visitors from Minas Gerais and other Espírito Santo cities. The Reis Magos River estuary is located there. Praia Grande offers lodging and dining options with guesthouses, hotels, camping, rental properties, restaurants, bars, and kiosks. Due to restricted beachfront urbanization, its natural features are preserved. During Carnival, this beach attracts as many as 100,000 people who come to enjoy the music. Its calm waters are ideal for water sports and boat tours.

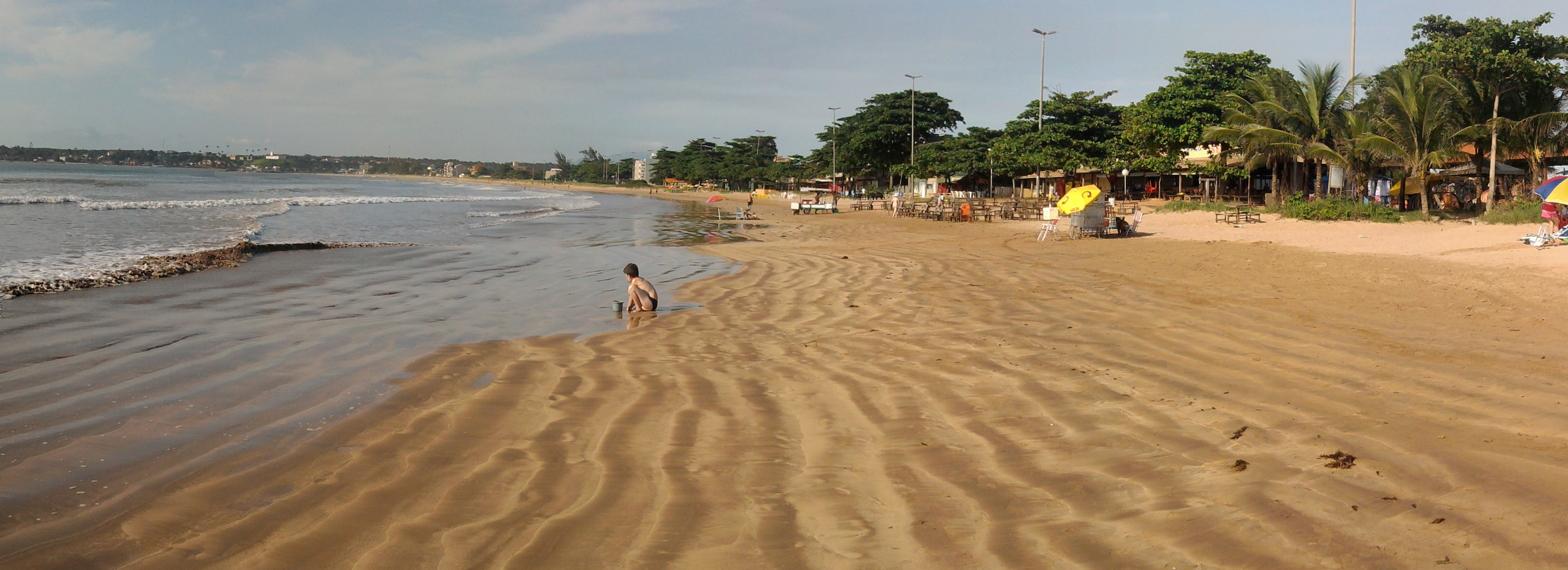
Praia Grande, Fundão’s main beach.

The Rio Preto Beach, on the border with Aracruz, and Enseada das Garças are less frequented, with fine sands. Rio Preto Beach, 100 meters from ES-010, is well-preserved with Atlantic Forest reserves and high waves suitable for surfing. Enseada das Garças, between Flecheira and Fortaleza points and 500 meters from ES-010, has abundant seaweed and a rocky, muddy bottom. It features bars, restaurants, and camping but suffers from disorganized occupation, compromising its original characteristics. It is more visited in summer by tourists.

Just 50 meters from ES-010, the small Porto da Lama cove has coarse sands and, due to mangrove landfills, non-native vegetation, but also calm waters and restinga. It is less frequented, located between two reef points, with a 250-meter stretch and a sandy, muddy bottom, serving as an anchorage for fishing boats, hence its name. Its waters are clear in summer and murky in winter.

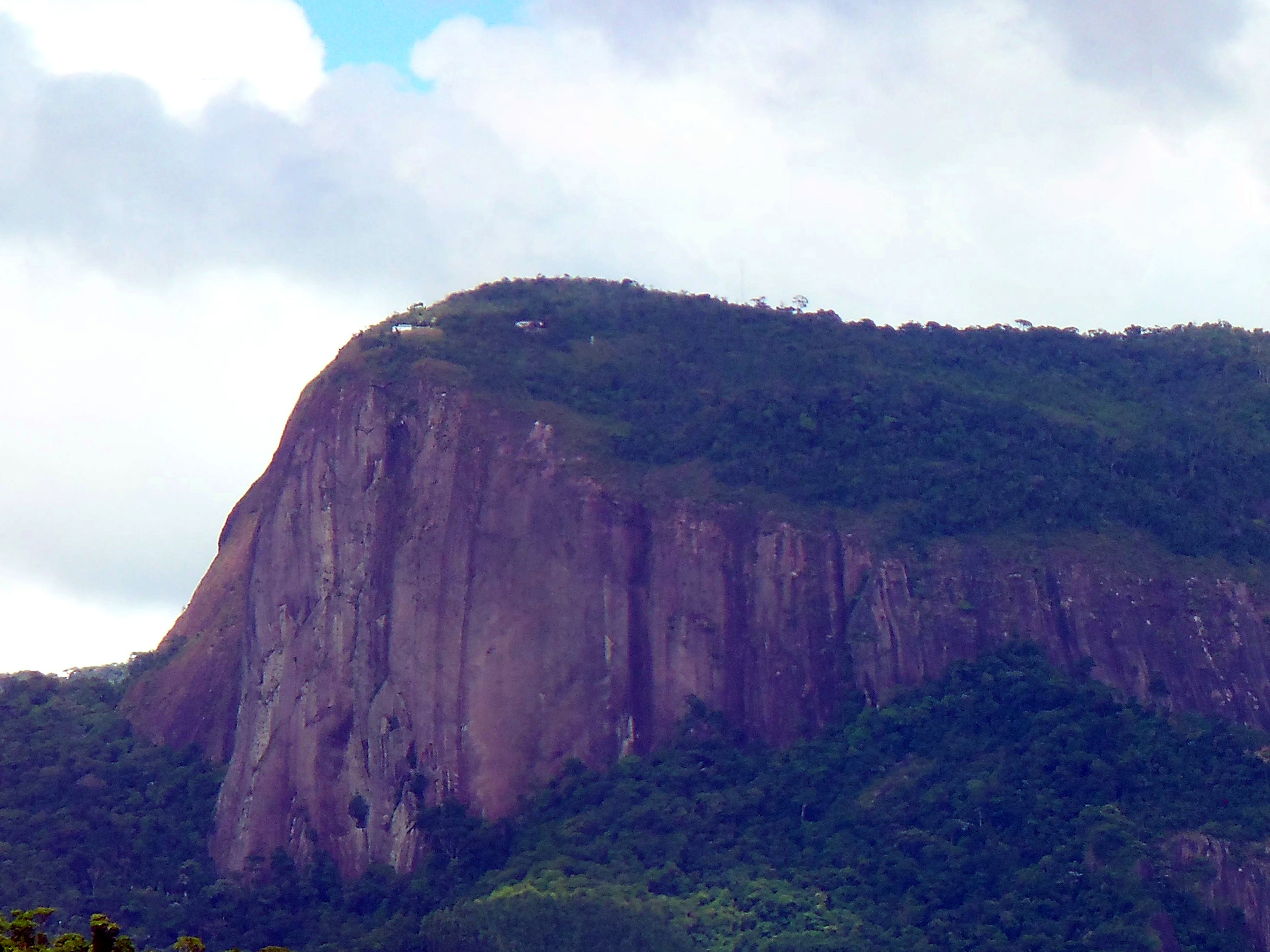
Goiapaba-Açu peak seen from Fundão.

In the municipality’s interior, the Goiapaba-Açu Peak, accessible via ES-261, houses a native plant nursery and a micropropagation laboratory for orchids, bromeliads, and fruit plants. The park features trails, natural lookouts, waterfalls, springs, valleys, and an events center for visitors. From its summit, several regional cities are visible. It is also possible to enjoy adventure tourism in the park, in the form of hang gliding, paragliding, and enduro.

Five kilometers from the seat via ES-261 toward Praia Grande, the Fundão or Jarrão Waterfall attracts up to 200 visitors daily on weekends, especially in summer. Located in a rocky section of the Fundão River on Nilsinho’s property, it features several one-meter-high falls and a dam 150 meters away. It has a navigable 10-meter-wide pool and a 15-meter-wide, 500-meter-long rapid. The dam contains introduced fish species such as peacock bass, armored catfish, carp, tilapia, and Malaysian prawns, which reproduce among cattails in March, when fishing is prohibited. Due to the city's sewage system, the waterfall is not suitable for swimming. The site includes a bar, fishing facilities, a campground, and an old working distillery.

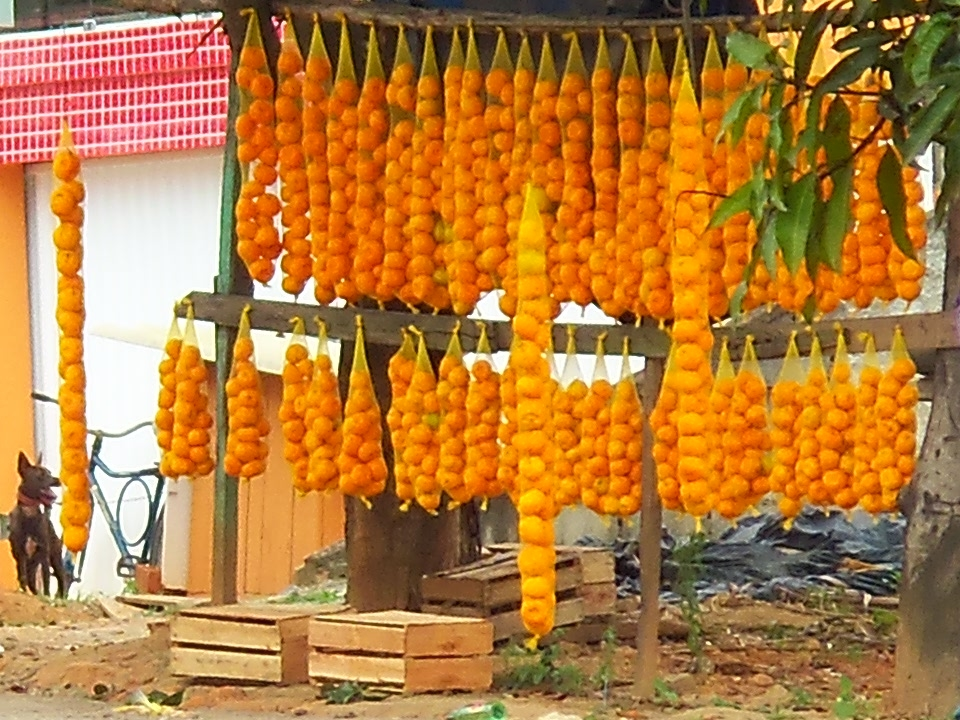
Tangerine stalls, a symbol of Fundão.

In Timbuí, the dam of the former hydroelectric plant, three kilometers from BR-101, has a one-meter waterfall and small rapids among rocks, suitable for bathing and fishing. In Duas Bocas, four kilometers from the seat, the Salto Waterfall, formed by an old hydroelectric dam with a one-meter drop, has murky, cold waters and coarse sand banks, favorable for bathing and leisure activities. Other waterfalls exist in the municipality, such as on the Piabas River.

Fundão is known for roadside commerce. Since the late 1960s, stalls along BR-101 sell fruits, particularly ponkans, a municipal symbol. Also on BR-101, since the 1960s, Dona Jandyra’s sweets are sold, including cocadas, jams, liqueurs (made from araçaúna, fig, banana, genipap, mallow, and rose or carnation petals), pickles, cakes, candies, and crystallized sweets, made from gilo, papaya, guava, fig, tomato, carrot, beetroot, jackfruit, orange, and genipap. Since March 1994, the Lorena dairy, located on ES-261 toward Santa Teresa, has been artisanally producing cheeses such as cottage cheese, Minas cheese, mozzarella, provolone, palm heart cheese, and cabacinha cheese.

Annual events include Catholic festivals in neighborhoods and rural communities, June festivals, the Political Emancipation Festival in July, New Year’s Eve, and Carnival in Praia Grande, and the São Benedito and São Sebastião festivals in Timbuí (December to January) and Fundão (20 January), featuring congo bands and processions. These festivals attract about 2,000 people each. From 1993 to 1997, the Tangerine Festival was held in May.

=== Sports ===
The municipality was home to the American football teams Fundão Spartans, runner-up in the 2010 state Muqueca Bowl championship, and Antares American Football (now Cabritos American Football), runner-up in the 2012 Espírito Santo American Football Championship and participant in the 2012 Touchdown Tournament.

In soccer, the Comercial Futebol Clube maintains a training school for children. One of its alumni is Luan Garcia, a defender who played for Vasco da Gama and the Brazil national under-23 football team, and who won a gold medal at the 2016 Summer Olympics.

Fundão is home to the Josel de Oliveira Sports Gymnasium, near the forest nursery, with a capacity of 5,000 seats, and, in the Oseias neighborhood, the Manoel de Almeida Matos Stadium, owned by the Comercial Futebol Clube.

=== Holidays ===
In Fundão, Good Friday and St. Joseph's Day (19 March) are municipal holidays, with the Executive Branch able to decree up to twelve optional holidays per year, as per municipal law No. 1,266/2021. According to federal law No. 9,093 12 September 1995, municipalities may have up to four municipal holidays, including Good Friday.

Previous municipal holidays included Saint Sebastian Day on 20 January; Fundão’s Political Emancipation Day on 5 July, Our Lady of Penha Day, Corpus Christi, and the day of President Eurico Gaspar Dutra’s visit to Fundão on 11 September. The Emancipation Day, since law 536 10 March 1982, was also called Saint Anthony Zaccaria and Municipality Creation Day, and Saint Sebastian Day, since law 544 7 March 2008, was called Saint Sebastian and Saint Benedict Day, mandatorily celebrated on the first Monday after 20 January.

== See also ==
- List of municipalities in Espírito Santo
