= Paulo Virgínio =

Brazilian rural laborer and revolutionary

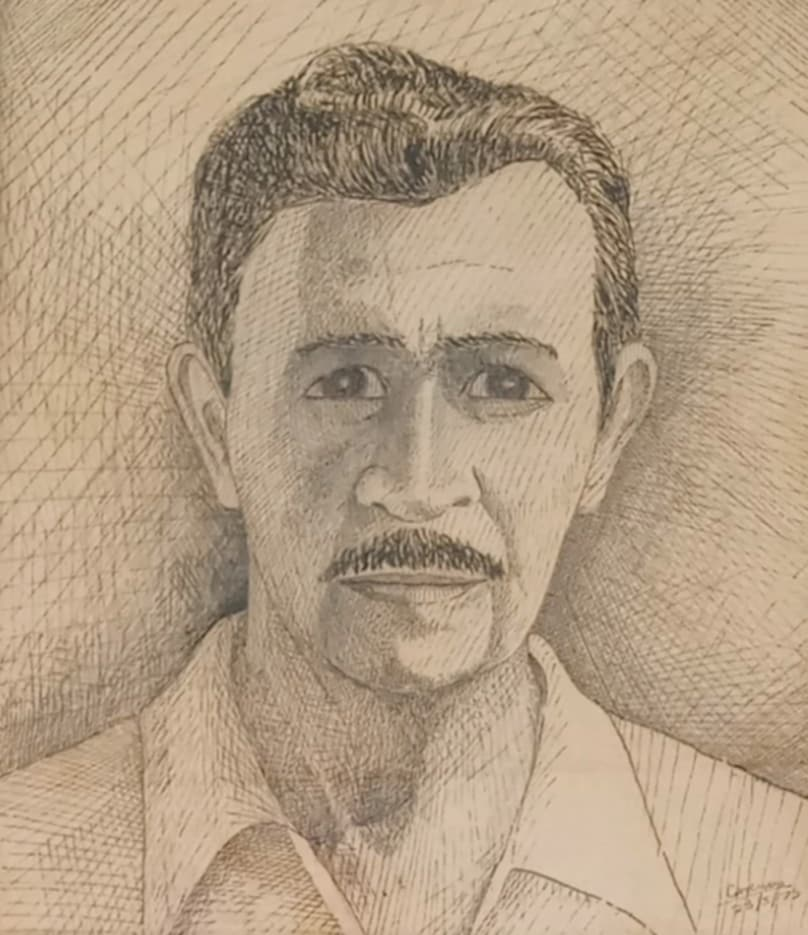
- Facial composite
- Born: Paulo Gonçalves dos Santos; Cunha (SP), Brazil
- Baptised: 26 September 1897
- Died: 28 July 1932; Cunha (SP), Brazil
- Cause of death: Execution by firing squad
- Resting place: Mausoleum of the Obelisk of São Paulo; 23°35′05″S 46°39′17″W
- Monuments: Cross at km 56.9 of State Road SP-171
- Occupations: Tiller, rural laborer
- Years active: Early 20th century
- Known for: Martyr and civil hero of the Brazilian Constitutionalist Revolution
- Spouse: Juventina Maria da Conceição
- Children: 3
- Parents: Virgínio Gonçalves dos Santos (father); Maria Joaquina de Jesus (mother)

Paulo Virgínio (born Paulo Gonçalves dos Santos, (Note: The native mode to pronounce his nickname, according to the local dialect of Portuguese, is ˈpawlu viʁˈʒĩnju (/ˈpaʊloʊ vɪərˈdʒiːnioʊ/), while his full name is ˈpawlu ɡõˈsawvis dus ˈsɐ̃tus (/ˈpaʊloʊ ɡɒnˈsaʊvɪs dʊs ˈsæntoʊs/).) c. 1897 – 28 July 1932) was a Brazilian rural laborer who became one of the martyrs and civil heroes of the 1932 Brazilian Constitutionalist Revolution.

A symbol of popular resistance against the dictatorship of then-president Getúlio Vargas, he was killed in the Cunha neighborhood of Aparição (at km 56.9 of the current State Road SP-171) with eighteen shots in the back for not revealing to the pro-government forces from Rio de Janeiro, present in those surroundings, where the garrisons of the Public Force (now the Military Police) of São Paulo were positioned along that road and what the possible paths would be to bypass the center of the municipality and reach the city of São Paulo, avoiding the land blockade.

His nickname derives from "Paulo of Virgínio", that is to say "Paulo, son of Virgínio", in reference to his father's name; however, it is possible to find in literature a variant with the letter "L" ("Virgílio") or mixed with his surname ("Paulo Virgínio Gonçalves"), as mentioned on the electronic page about Brazilian Criminal Action No. 3,190/1933, of the Superior Military Court (STM) of Brazil. His nickname bears no relation or reminiscence to the work Paul et Virginie by Bernardin de Saint-Pierre, 1788.

== Early life ==
Paulo Gonçalves dos Santos was born in Taboão, a neighborhood located about twenty kilometers south of the city of Cunha, in the state of São Paulo, Brazil. Regarding his exact date of birth, there are significant historical discrepancies. Some sources indicate the year 1899 (giving him a symbolic age range corresponding to the age of Jesus Christ during his crucifixion); however, the Society of the Veterans of 1932 maintains the date 26 September 1897: the Sunday of his baptism under the public administration of the Parish of Our Lady of Conception (Mother Church of Cunha), as the oldest testimony of his newborn existence – resulting in an age older than 33. In Brazilian law, ecclesiastical documents, such as baptismal or marriage certificates, issued before or during the transition to the mandatory general civil registry (now RG) in 1888, possess public faith for the purpose of proving parentage and birth date in cases of absence of the RG or any other civil document.

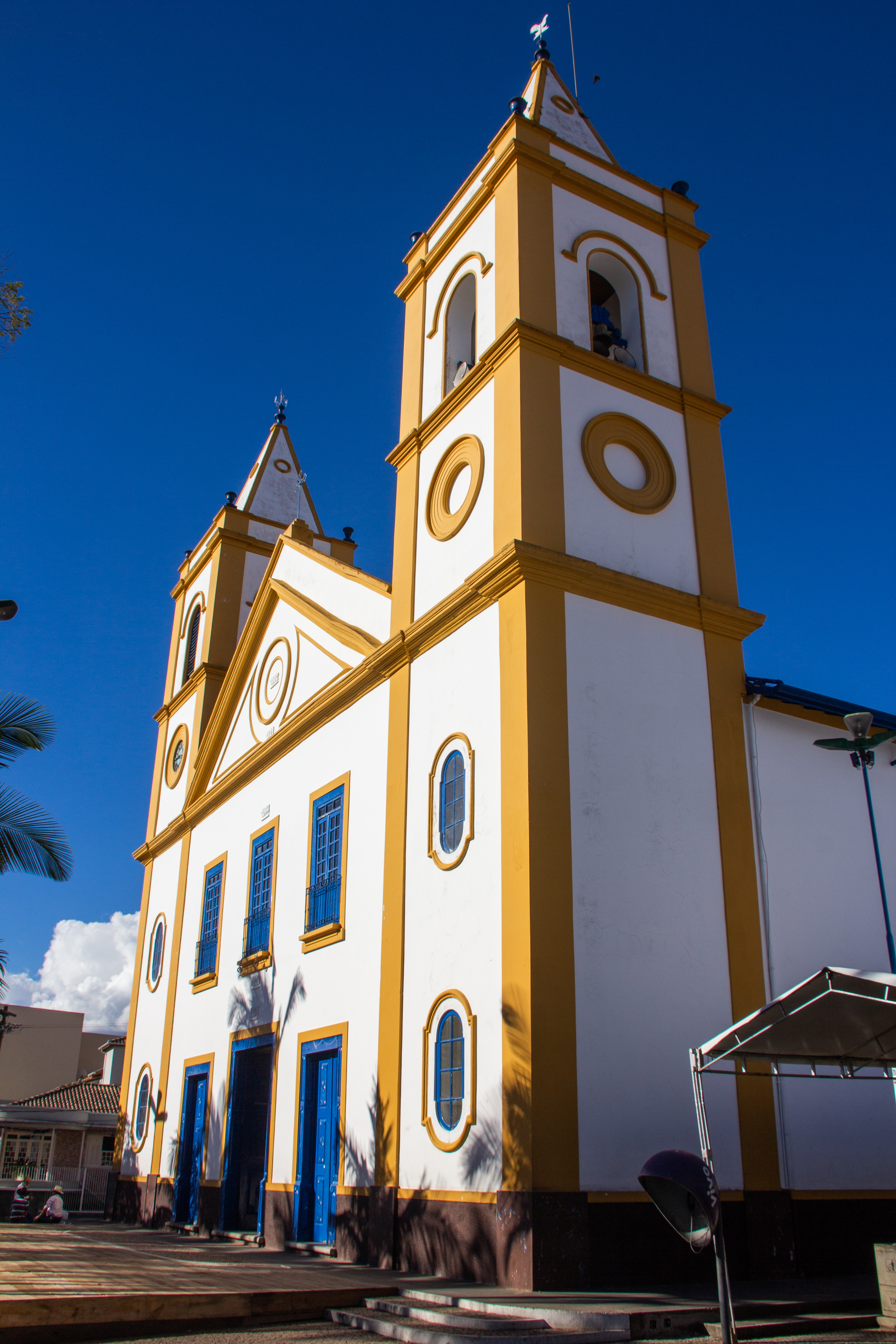
Mother Church of Cunha

Dos Santos is descended from a family of peasant farmers who inhabited the Taboão hinterland, a neighborhood of Cunha located in the Indaiá zone (a fraction of the Serra do Mar, bordering the highlands of Bocaina), near the natural state line (divisa estadual) with Rio de Janeiro. His father's name was Virgínio Gonçalves dos Santos and his mother's name was Maria Joaquina de Jesus. As his private life is not in the public domain, there are not many mentions of his childhood or lifestyle: only that he received a modest education and, during his growth, always remained in the vicinity of that hinterland, living with few resources, in the Caipira ethnic way of being (that is, as a simple person from the countryside).

As a young man, he learned how to tend to agricultural fields, and he worked for local landowners, looking after plows and crops, which consolidated his identity as a tiller (a general agricultural laborer; Portuguese: lavrador). In the book Cruzes Paulistas (first published in 1936), the jurist and public prosecutor José Augusto César Salgado (who began his legal career in the district of Cunha city) described him as a humble, intelligent and friendly person. During his rural upbringing, the rural laborer acquired empirical knowledge of the paths and trails that connected various locations between the Paraíba Valley and the Atlantic coast, transporting cargo from Cunha to Paraty and vice-versa with his fellow tropeiros (muleteers), all on horseback along the road that was part of the old Caminho do Ouro (Gold Trail) and has today become the State Road SP-171 on the São Paulo side (until Guaratinguetá city) and the State Road RJ-165 on the Rio de Janeiro side.

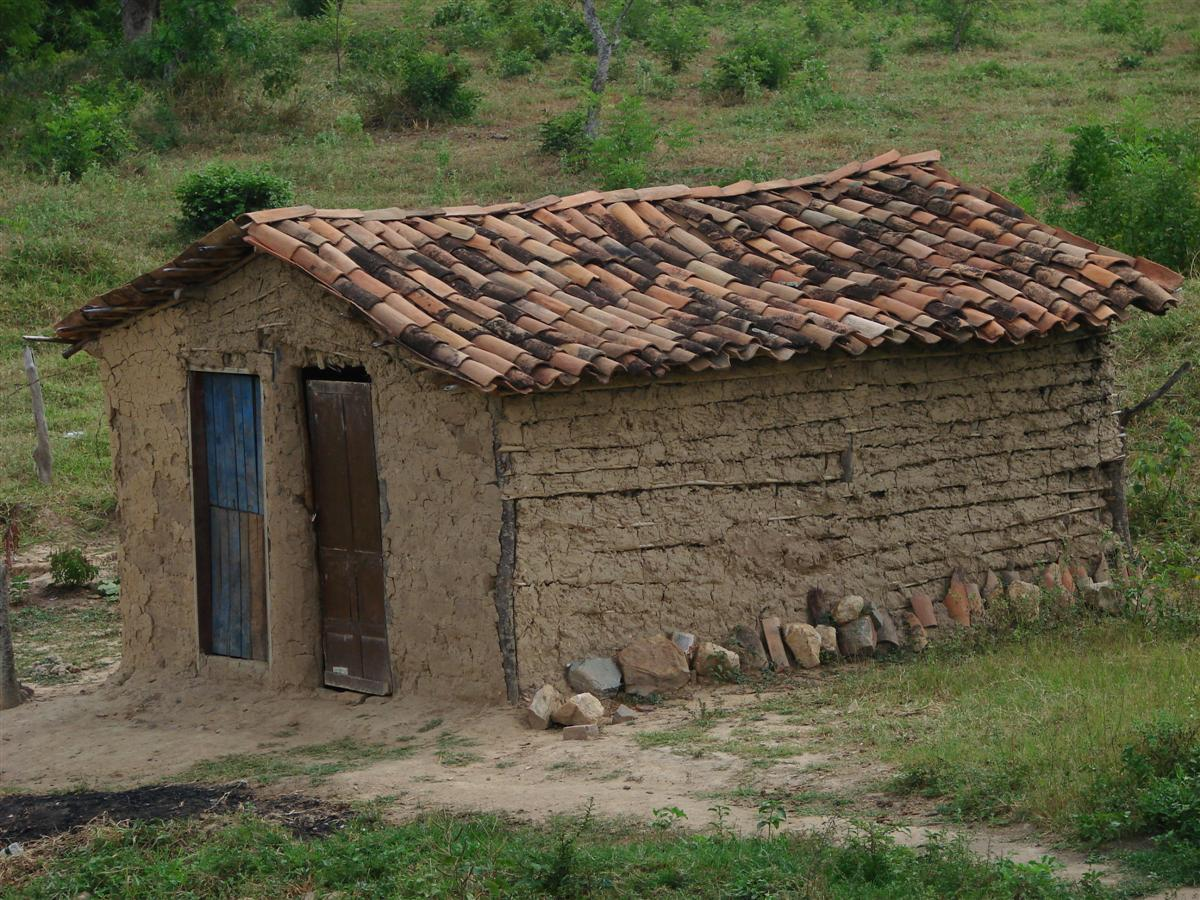
Example of a rustic wattle and daub house in Brazil

Dos Santos's life as a rural laborer was humble; he and his family lived in a rustic house made of wattle and daub, a typical dwelling of Caipiras (Sertaneja) societies living in deep isolation, far from Brazilian urbanized areas. As there are not many historiographical mentions of his daily actions, it is not a simple task to reconcile popular tales with what actually happened. However, what can be stated and verified is that during the period of political transition between the Old Republic and the Vargas Era, he started a family – marrying Juventina Maria da Conceição and becoming the father of three children (named Virgílio, José, and Júlia) – and always remained with them in the area of the neighborhoods near the state line, about twenty kilometers away from the urban zone.

Paulo Virgínio, a Caipira from Taboão, is one of those examples of Caboclo heroism. His story lives today in the lyre of the Sertanejo bard and in the hearts of the people of Cunha, which is why the chronicle of the events in which he played a leading role has not yet spread as much as it should.

During the beginning of 1932, due to the clash with Rio de Janeiro (then the seat of the Federal District) of Brazil, civilians who did not enlist, as was the case with Paulo, had to be cautious when moving through the municipality and avoid entrenched zones. However, the absence of fast and efficient means of communication, such as radio or telegraph, left the rural population somewhat oblivious to large-scale events and the imminent conflict that was brewing.

== Beginning of the Vargas Era ==
The political scenario during the period when Paulo Virgínio dos Santos was born was known as the Old Republic era, the time after the dissolution of the Empire of Brazil (a constitutional monarchy), when Brazil began to be governed by a series of military or political party leaders. The system of alternating power that characterized the Old Republic, based on cooperation between the state governments of São Paulo and Minas Gerais, underwent a definitive reconfiguration in 1929. Assessing the global economic crisis taking place, then-president Washington Luís demanded a management aligned with São Paulo's financial policy and, for this reason, chose to nominate Júlio Prestes – also from São Paulo – as his successor. This decision diverged from the expectations of the Minas Gerais leadership, who were awaiting the nomination of a name from their federal unit. Faced with this new scenario, Minas Gerais sought other alliances, joining with the states of Rio Grande do Sul and Paraíba and forming the "Liberal Alliance", a party that presented Getúlio Vargas from Rio Grande do Sul as the opposition candidate.

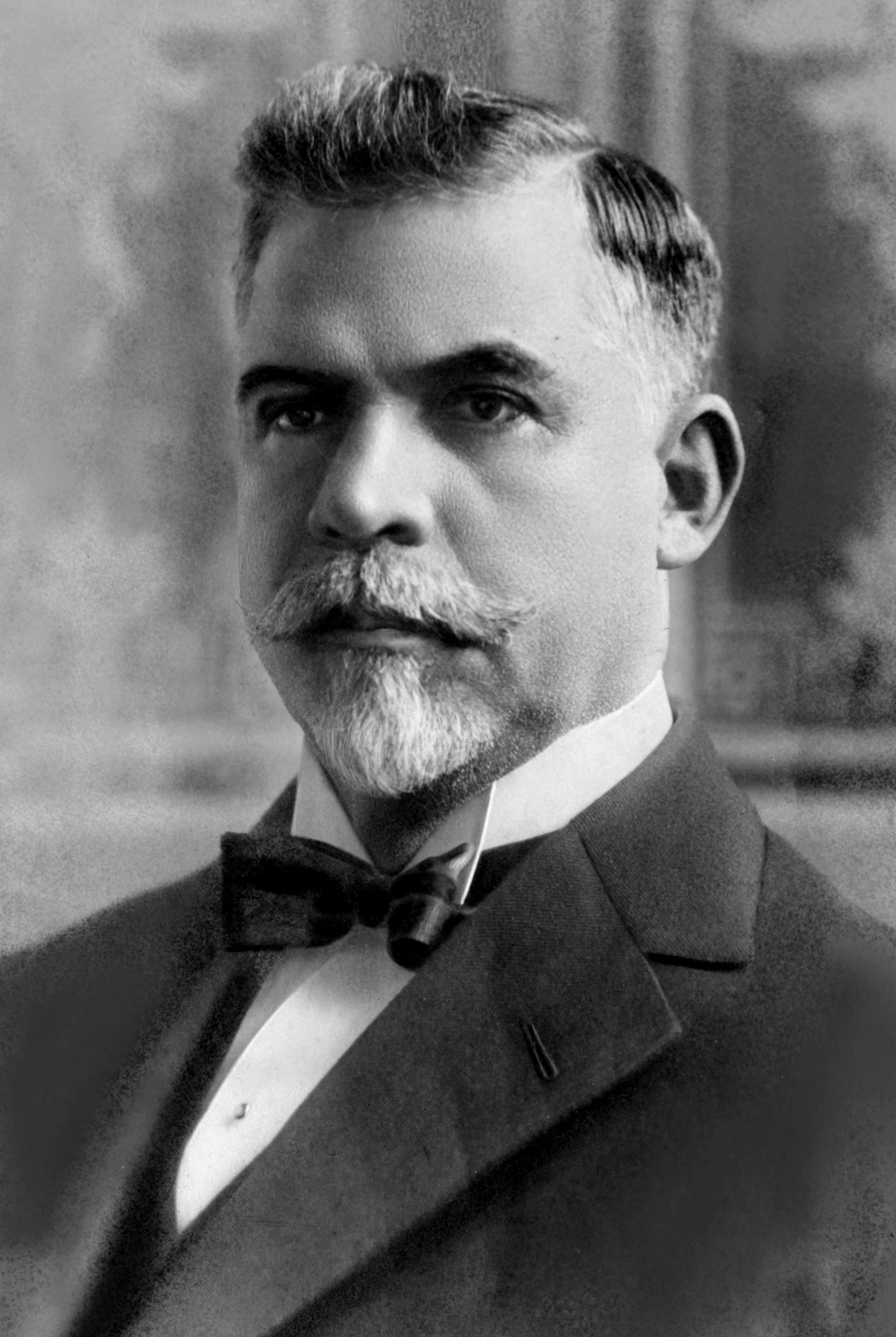
Washington Luís, President of Brazil from 1926 to 1930

Although Júlio Prestes was declared the winner in the March 1930 elections, the results were contested by the opposition. The climate of instability was heightened by the assassination of Vargas's vice-presidential candidate, the Paraíban lawyer João Pessoa, an event that served as a catalyst for the Revolution of 1930 (known as "The Coup of 1930"). On November 3rd of that year, the Brazilian Federal Military Junta handed power over to Getúlio Vargas, who took office as Chief of the Provisional Government of Brazil, beginning the Vargas Era. This model of government was instituted under the premise of being a transitional administration, whose main objective would be to prepare the country for a new democratic phase; however, in practice, it allowed Vargas to concentrate full powers in his hands while the new structure of the Republic remained undecided.

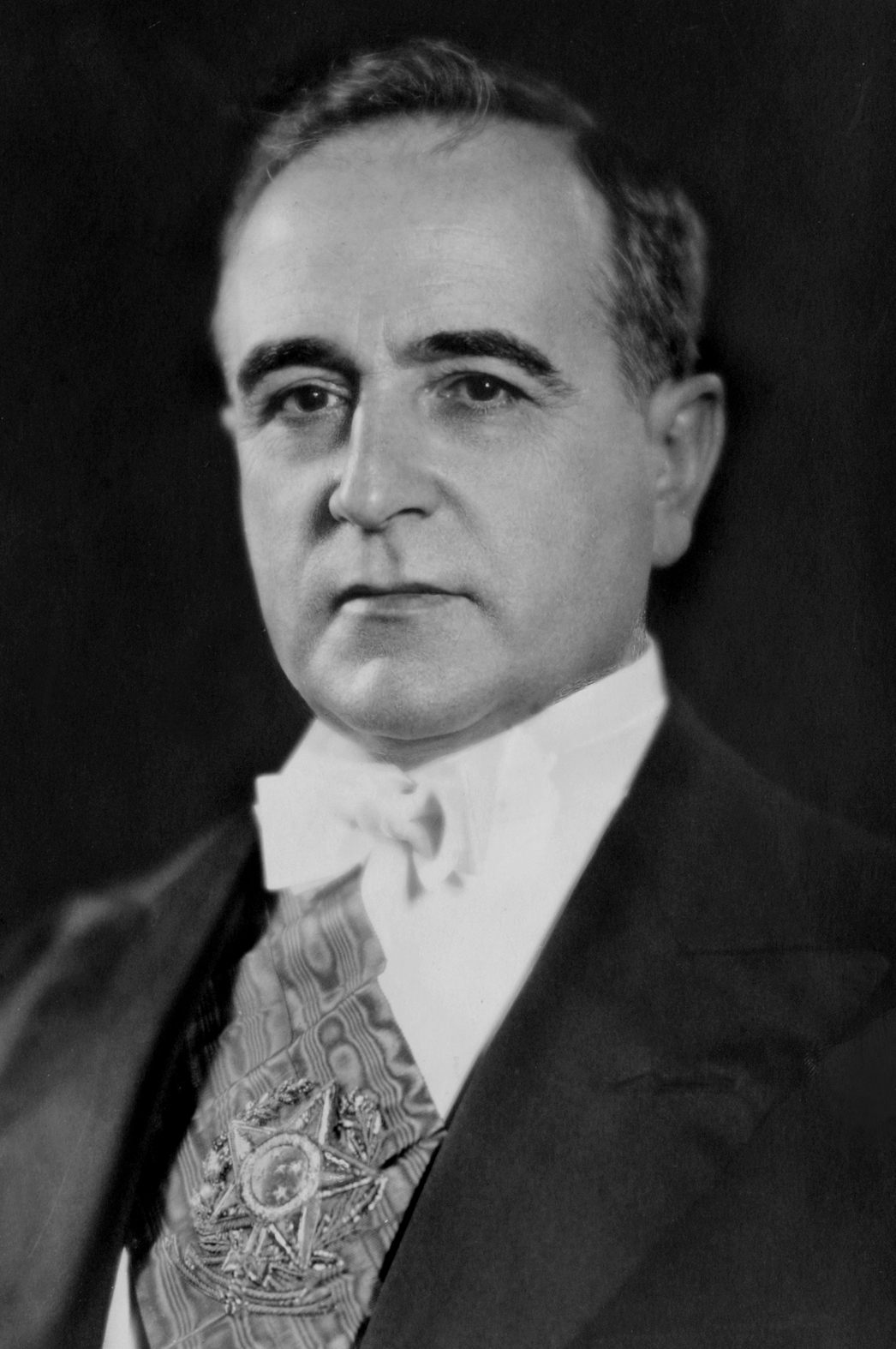
Getúlio Vargas, President of Brazil from 1930 to 1945 and from 1951 to 1954

As a result of this new scenario, Brazil began to be governed by decrees that suspended the limits on presidential power in the Brazilian Constitution of 1891; without those limits, there is no "higher law" above the president, meaning that President Vargas's decisions could be made directly, without the need for approval by Congress or consultation with other democratic powers. This fact gave rise to the term "Varguista Dictatorship".

In 1929, the Wall Street stock market crash triggered a global economic downturn (the Great Depression) which would cause serious consequences in the following years. Faced with this crisis, in an attempt to safeguard Brazilian foreign trade, Getúlio Vargas ordered the literal burning of coffee stocks in Brazilian warehouses. The coffee was the main exported product at the time; however, the economic contraction was inevitable and drained the resources of São Paulo (the largest contributor to the coffee industry), generating unemployment in both urban centers and rural areas: about 30% of the employed Brazilian workforce was immediately dismissed.

In response, Vargas implemented measures such as Decree No. 19,482, which limited immigration, attempting to give preference to the national workforce. However, despite the creation of the Ministry of Labor on 26 November, 1930, these actions imposed rigid federal control over labor unions. For the population, the scenario remained marked by deplorable working conditions and a growing loss of political autonomy, fueling deep dissatisfaction against the federal government.

The state of São Paulo, which until then had occupied a central position in the country's leadership, found itself in a critical situation relative to the other federative units. In addition to the stagnation of the economy caused by the coffee crisis, São Paulo's citizens began to be governed by interventors appointed directly by Vargas, removing the autonomy of local rulers. The lack of a full National Constitution and the perception that the state's needs were being neglected by the Federal District generated deep frustration in São Paulo society. This discontent united different social classes around a common goal: the redemocratization of the country. This was the scenario of uncertainty and tension that would soon reach the mountains of Cunha, transforming the lives of rural workers like Paulo Virgínio and other local countrysiders.

== Casus belli of the Constitutionalist Revolution and the Battle of Cunha ==
The peak of political tension occurred on the afternoon of Monday, 23 May 1932, when a demonstration in downtown São Paulo city against the abuses of the Vargas regime ended in tragedy: four young men (identified as Mário Martins de Almeida, aged 25, Euclides Miragaia, aged 21, Dráusio Marcondes de Sousa, aged 14, and Antônio Américo Camargo de Andrade, aged 30) were killed by loyalist agents. That tragedy was the casus belli (a Latin phrase meaning 'occasion for war') for an armed conflict that would become known as the Brazilian Constitutionalist Revolution (also referred to as the Paulista War; the term "Paulista" refers to a person or thing that is native to or belongs to the state of São Paulo). From that moment on, a political-military association was created, named MMDC for the initials of the young men who were killed, that nourished the sentiment of a national revolution.

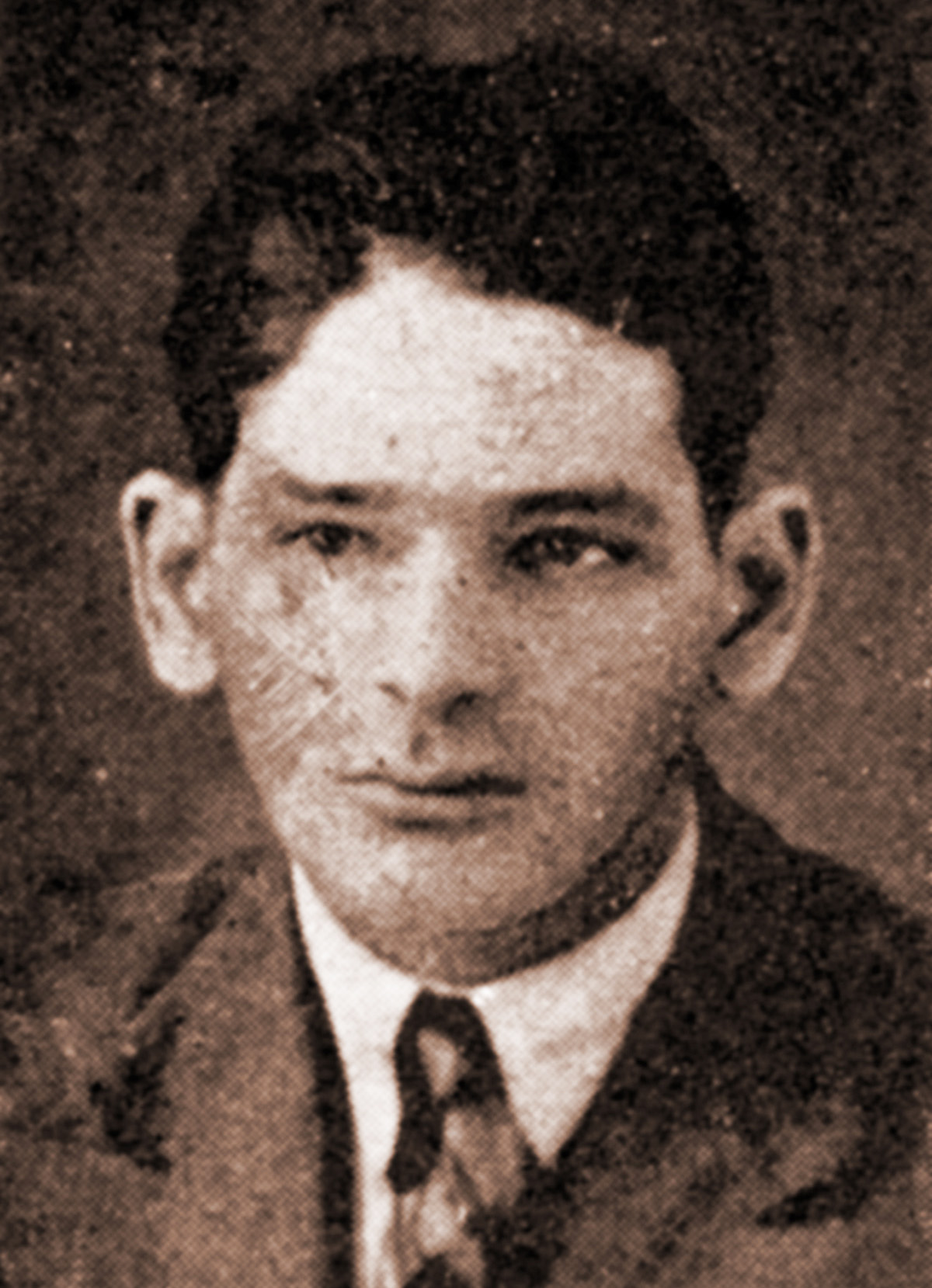
Martins, aged 25

The conflict divided Brazil between the loyalist (or federal government) forces, who sought to maintain the dictatorial order allied with Vargas, and the constitutionalist forces, composed of dissident military personnel and civilian volunteers. The main objective of the constitutionalists – led by the Paulistas who initially received support from state sectors in Minas Gerais, Rio Grande do Sul and Mato Grosso – was the immediate reform of the National Constitution, aiming to guarantee the redemocratization of the country, where rulers would be elected by direct popular vote instead of arbitrary political appointments made by Getúlio Vargas.

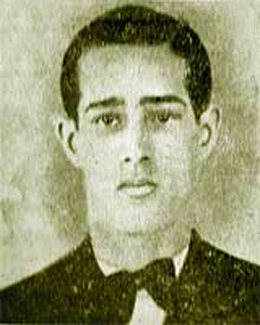
Miragaia, aged 21

The revolt gained full scale on Saturday, 9 July 1932, when São Paulo's Public Force (now the Military Police of São Paulo State) unanimously joined the movement, formally allying itself with the constitutionalists. The following day, reinforcements from the 4th Infantry Regiment of Quitaúna, with headquarters in Osasco city, state of São Paulo, consolidated the military resistance, allowing for the inauguration of General Pedro Manuel de Toledo as state governor. Under Toledo's administration, battle fronts were established along state line paths to contain the advance of loyalist garrisons coming from Rio de Janeiro, then the seat of the Federal District. In this context, roads, railway and highway routes of the Paraíba Valley became crucial defense points.

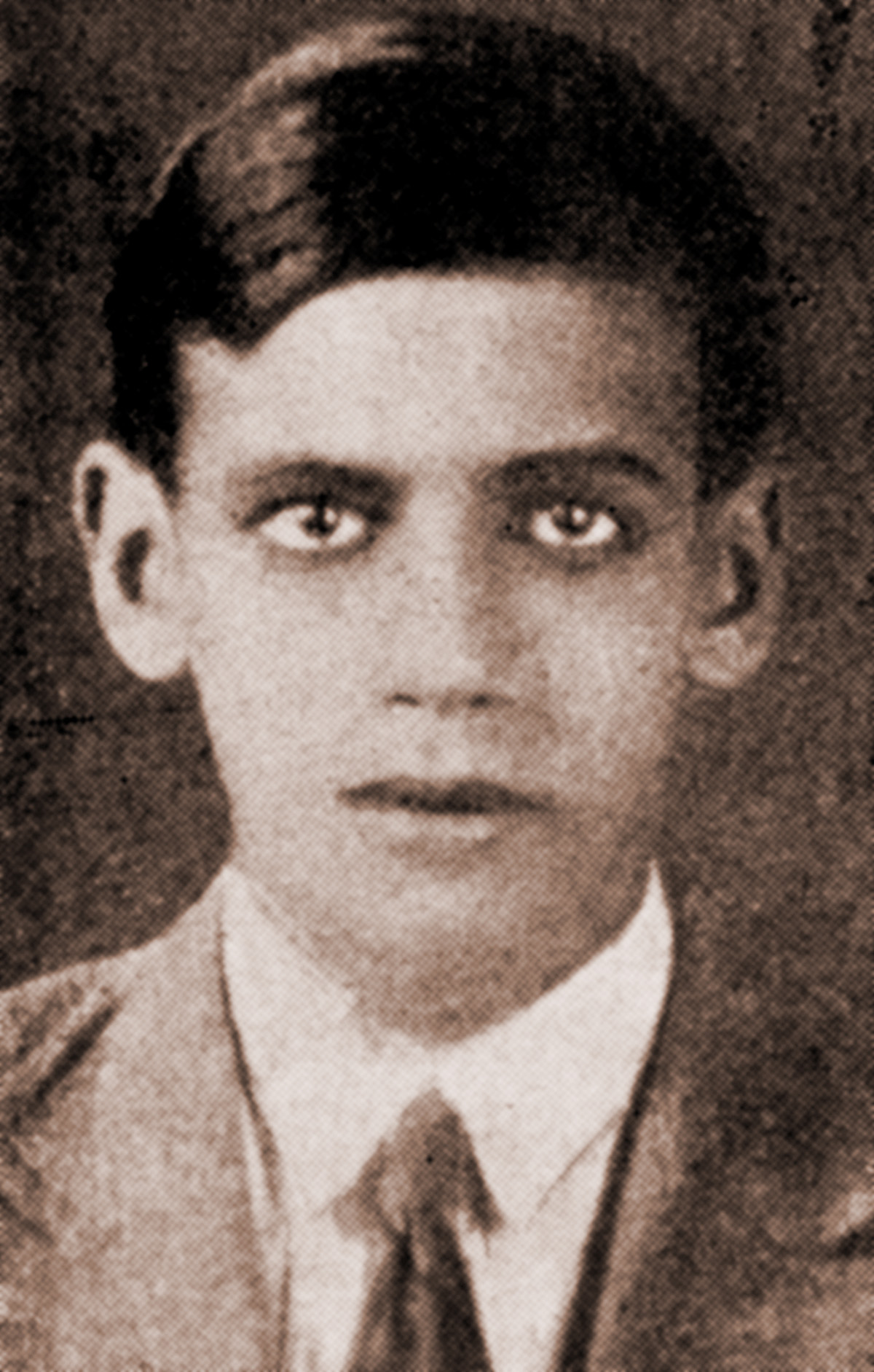
Dráusio, aged 14

Due to the presence of loyalist troops at the top of the Bocaina mountains, the municipality of Cunha took on a strategic role for a relevant armed front. With the support of volunteers native to Cunha and Guaratinguetá, the constitutionalist troops, led by General Mário da Veiga Abreu, occupied secret positions within a certain perimeter in the sector known as Morro Grande, about two kilometers south of the downtown. From that post, they maintained constant surveillance over the paths coming from Paraty. The logistical relevance in controlling State Road SP-171 culminated in the official start of the Battle of Cunha on 14 July 1932. That same afternoon, in a humanitarian appeal, aeronautical engineer Alberto Santos-Dumont went so far as to draft a note to the authorities asking for a ceasefire and the restoration of the constitutional order in the country; however, his plea was ignored.

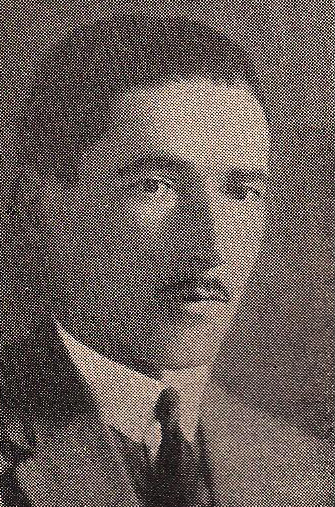
Camargo, aged 30

As a result of the military uprising initiated by the Paulistas against the federal government's management, which occurred on that 9th day, a garrison from the Navy of Rio de Janeiro composed of four hundred soldiers – under the orders of General Góis Monteiro and the leadership of Captain Augusto do Amaral Peixoto – began a bimodal march with the goal of reaching the capital of São Paulo and inhibiting the resistance present in the state. Following their departure from Guanabara Bay to Paraty, the contingent climbed the Bocaina mountains via the State Road RJ-165 and entered the municipal limits of Cunha via the State Road SP-171.

Three days later (July 14th), while advancing toward the city downtown, the troops came face to face with the armed blockade of the São Paulo Public Force infantry. In the afternoon, the first shots of that battle were exchanged: the Paulistas resisted successfully, forcing the Rio de Janeiro forces to retreat to the districts of Cunha near the state line. Realizing that the conflict would be longer than both sides had imagined, the fluminense garrison had to temporarily halt its land advance and set up camp in the Aparição perimeter (a neighborhood located ten kilometers south of downtown). On the 17th of that month, the Federal Government made available two fighter planes (model O2U Corsair by Vought) for reconnaissance expeditions of the terrain connected by the SP-171 route; however, after several frustrated attempts to find enemy positions, the two fighters were fired upon and had to return to Galeão Airport.

During this phase of fluminense occupation in Cunha, the Rio de Janeiro soldiers exercised rigid control over the neighborhoods of Rio Abaixo, Aparição, Campo Alegre, Taboão, and Mato Limpo (these sectors formed a logistical corridor connecting the municipality to the state line). This control included: the forced employment of local men to assist in the campaign; the searching for provisions in nearby properties; the confiscation of animals from those traveling to Paraty City along the SP-171 route without a safe-conduct or identity document; and, in some cases, the detention of civilians passing through the camps under suspicion of espionage.

== Martyrdom and End of the Revolution ==
According to records in the book Cruzes Paulistas, in the initial moments following the start of the Battle of Cunha, the tiller Paulo Virgínio (i.e., dos Santos) was reportedly requisitioned to help carry cargo from Paraty to top of the Bocaina highlands. However, according to accounts preserved by MMDC, the young man had an animal seized during one of these tactical operations. Although he still maintained his freedom, the rural worker's situation became difficult as he understood the gravity of the circumstances; he sought to be more discreet, hiding with his family in the Indaiá mountains region (a portion of the Serra do Mar mountain range in São Paulo that state borders the Bocaina highlands).

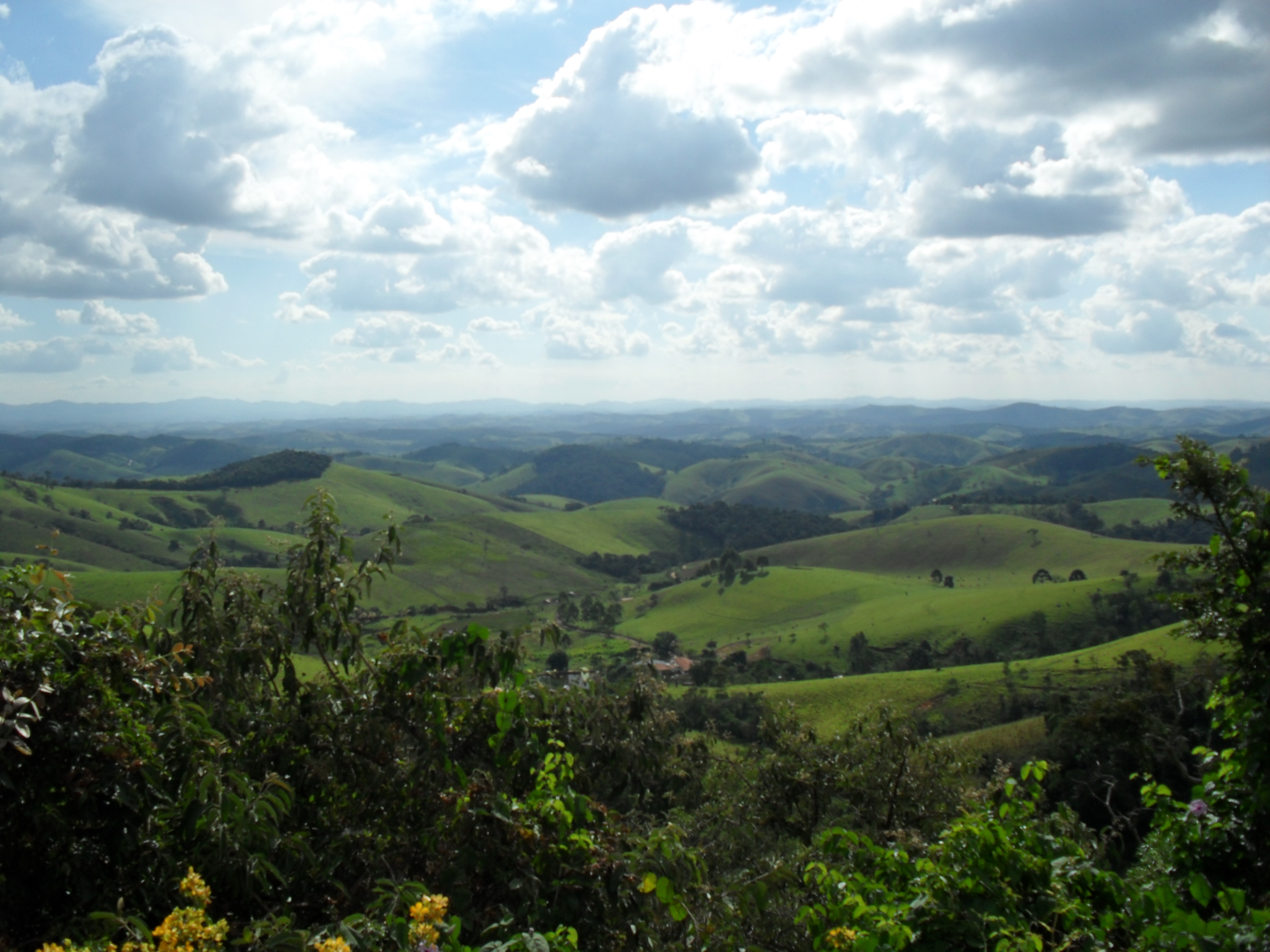
Typical landscape of the rural areas of municipality of Cunha

The federal regiment, in turn, sought local scouts and informants who knew secondary trails bordering the Jacuí River, aiming to bypass the constitutionalist strongholds and reach the Paraíba Valley. Faced with resistance or lack of knowledge from the first residents interrogated, the command issued a strategic communication to the population: it promised the restitution or reimbursement of requisitioned goods to all inhabitants who appeared at the camp to formalize their losses in that war. The maneuver, aimed at attracting men who knew the region, functioned as a kind of ambush.

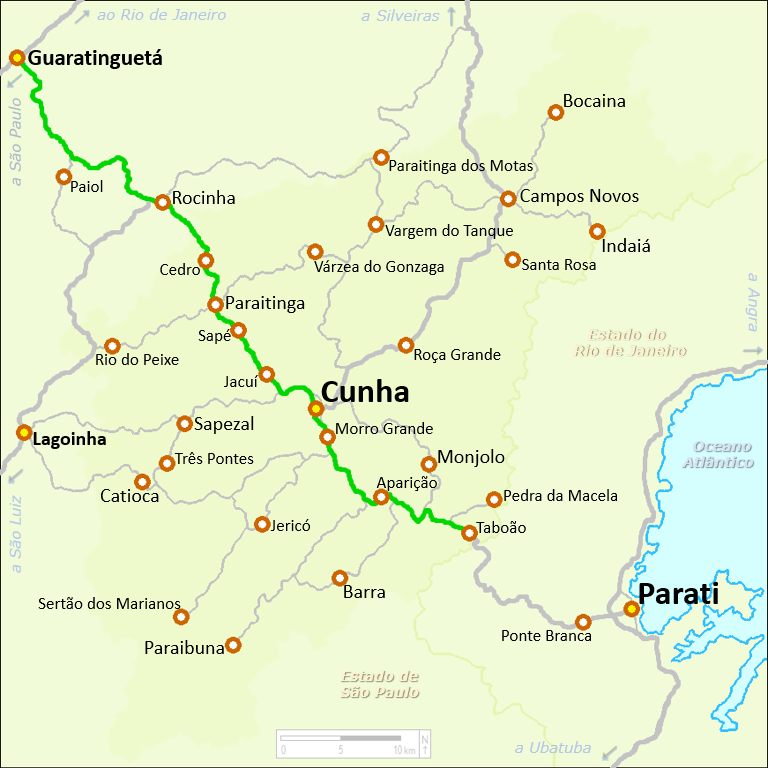
Map of the municipality of Cunha with the route of State Road SP-171 marked in green

On 27 July 1932, Paulo Virgínio had to leave the refuge of his home in the daily search for sustenance for his family. According to Criminal Action No. 3190/1933, presented by the Brazilian Superior Military Court (STM), at around 3:00 PM, motivated by the intention to recover his pack animal, he joined a group composed of five men (identified as Benedicto Alves Sampaio, Antônio Bonifácio Sampaio, João Baptista de Carvalho, Luiz Alves da Silva and José Policarpo) and headed to the Rio de Janeiro base of operations. Upon arriving at the Rio Abaixo sector, the men were escorted under the custody of a soldier (identified as "Sargento Veneno") to the post of Captain Augusto do Amaral Peixoto. In the commander's absence, the Sergeant placed the group under arrest on charges of espionage.

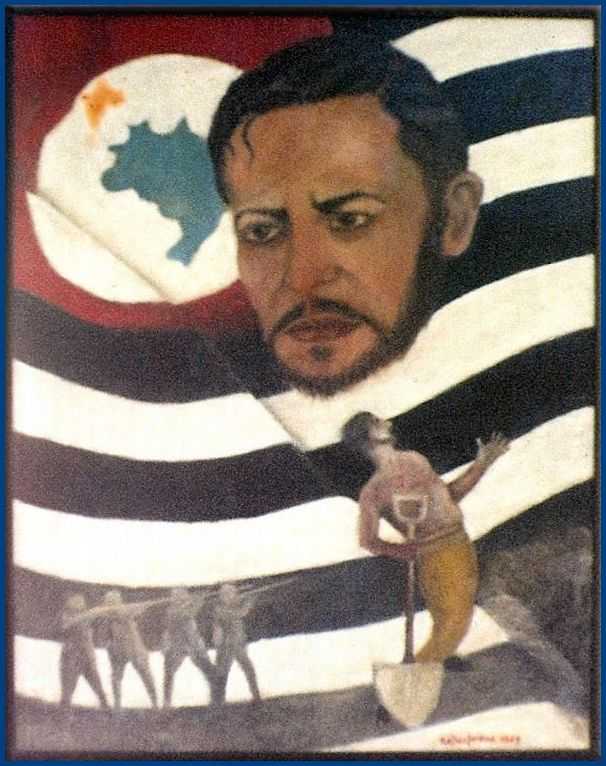
Allegory by Nelson Lorena, 1957: the moment when Lieutenant Ayrton Teixeira's four subordinates shot Paulo Virgínio after he had dug his own grave. The artistic sketch of the young farmer from Cunha and the São Paulo state flag are visible.

During the period of detention, each member of the group was interrogated and young man was identified as someone who likely knew where the São Paulo garrison was hidden. From then on, he was isolated, tied up, and subjected to assaults and insults, remaining in an improvised jail in a residence by the roadside during the night of July 27th to 28th. There are no further official details confirming the fate of the rest of the group. It is probable that the other detainees were released, considering that the inquiry presented by the STM refers only to the farmer as a victim of the offensive carried out by the loyalists.

Regardless of whether the detained rural laborer possessed information about the positions of the São Paulo troops, he did not respond satisfactorily to his aggressors and remained silent during his interrogation. After enduring that first night, during which frost formed, the torture continued. Around 6:00 AM, four subordinates (the Sergeants Roque Eugênio de Oliveira, Juvenal Bezerra Monteiro, Ascendino Dantas and the Army Marine Raymundo Jerônimo, men aged between 32 and 33), under the command of Lieutenant Ayrton Teixeira Ribeiro (aged 28), subjected the captured young man to an outdoor cold water bath at the spout of a monjolo (a type of water scoop) that existed there, in the Aparição stream, and afterwards poured boiling water over his back. Once the physical assault ended, the subordinates gave him a shovel, forcing him to dig his own grave. Upon completing the arduous task, Paulo Virgínio was executed with eighteen shots in the back. Due to the small size of the shallow grave, the loyalists broke the legs and skull of the corpse to make it fit in the hole, where it was buried without a coffin.

According to testimonies of that fierce execution, before the outcome, the legalists supposedly offered a "last chance" to release the young man by questioning his nature. Lieutenant Ayrton Teixeira, a commander who held certain authority at that moment, asked: "What are you?", to which Paulo replied: "I am Paulista". The soldier, in turn, reportedly countered: "No! If you say you are a Carioca, you will not die". However, Paulo did not waver and, in a final act of resistance, uttered the famous phrase that would immortalize him: "I die, but São Paulo wins!". The term "Carioca" applies to something that is native to or belongs to Rio de Janeiro city.

During the battle, one month after the aerial operations from Rio de Janeiro, it was the Paulistas' turn on August 27th. The Constitutionalists obtained support from the Gaviões de Penacho group: the mission was characterized by an unfavorable logistical heterogeneity, coordinating in a single patrol three distinct models of aircraft (one Potez 25 TOE, two Waco CSO, and two Curtiss Falcon). On the previous day, the 26th, the precision bombing and subsequent strafing of legalist positions advancing through the Espigão do Divino Mestre (five kilometers from the city downtown) resulted in the disruption of opposing defenses, allowing the São Paulo infantry to capture important military equipment and consolidate the land blockade of that sector. The armed conflict in the municipality of Cunha lasted until approximately September 8th, resulting, despite many casualties, in a significant victory for the Constitutionalists on this front as they managed to delay the legalists' land advance through the Serra do Mar.

Although the state of São Paulo preserved the integrity of the Cunha front, the political isolation caused by the absence of expected support from other states (such as Mato Grosso, Minas Gerais, and Rio Grande do Sul) prevented the dissolution of Getúlio Vargas's provisional government. The conflict officially ended on 2 October 1932, with the signing of the peace armistice in the city of Cruzeiro, state of São Paulo, formalizing the end of the Revolution, which became the largest armed conflict in Brazil without a direct foreign offensive. However, on 16 July 1934, Vargas yielded to the main demand of the constitutionalists with the promulgation of a new Federal Constitution. The constitutional text institutionalized labor reforms, such as the regularization of the eight-hour daily workday and paid vacations, and significant democratic changes, establishing secret and mandatory voting for citizens of both sexes, civilian or military, from eighteen years of age. To appease the political and social situation in Cunha, Vargas appointed Mr. Alfredo Casimiro da Rocha, the first medical doctor to reside permanently in the municipality, from the Republican Party of São Paulo (PRP) to be the mayor of Cunha in 1933, with deputy delegate Salvador Pacetti as vice-mayor.

== Honors and Tributes ==
With the end of the Revolution, the act of cruelty by the Rio de Janeiro forces was not ignored: on 7 June 1933, the Public Ministry of Brazil brought the case of Paulo Gonçalves dos Santos's death to the jury of the Superior Military Tribunal, denouncing Lieutenant Ayrton Teixeira Ribeiro and his four subordinates for abuse of authority, physical torture and intentional homicide. After years of investigation, the defendants were acquitted for lack of direct evidence, considering they were following orders and were protected by high-ranking officials of the Brazilian Federal Armed Forces. The inquiry was extensive and produced about four hundred pages on the case. Despite the acquittal of those responsible for the rural laborer's execution, the legalists offered compensation to his wife, Juventina Maria, who refused to accept it.

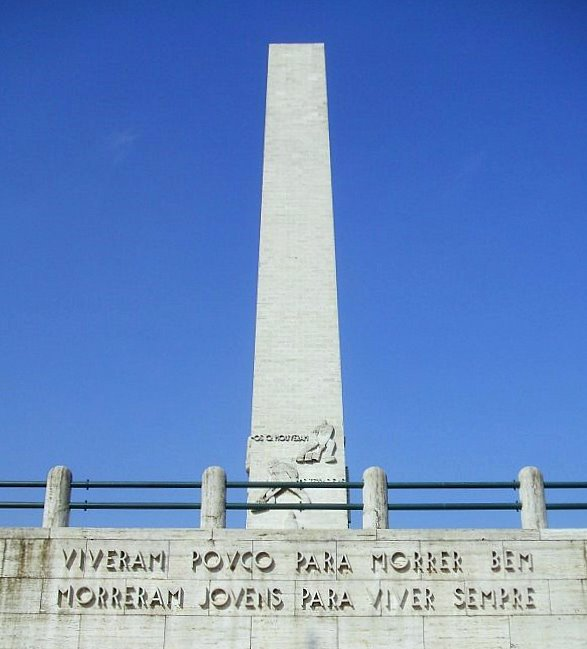
Obelisk of São Paulo

The sacrifice of the Cunha resident consolidated itself as one of the greatest symbols of resistance by the Brazilian population dissatisfied with the provisional government of Getúlio Vargas (which only ended on 29 October 1945). Due to his refusal to reveal the positions of the São Paulo Force in Cunha, he was recognized as one of the Heroes of 1932 by the MMDC Society, and his remains were transferred to the city of São Paulo. On 9 July 1955, they received an honorary funeral and currently rest in the Mausoleum of the Obelisk of São Paulo, located in Ibirapuera Park, in a prominent grave that also houses the remains of the four young men fallen on May 23rd. His death is frequently cited as one of the cruelest episodes of the Vargas dictatorship against a common citizen without a political or military role.

In the native tradition of the Serra do Mar hinterlands, his story was preserved through a moda de viola – a moda is a Brazilian country musical style, played primarily on the Caipira viola (a 10-string guitar), that tells stories of rural life, love, faith, etc. –, whose lyrics were composed by the musician Nicolau Sobrinho Filho (1932) and they were published by the magazine Paulistânia (SCHMIDT, 1948). The song not only describes the suffering and ideological firmness in the face of death of the young rural laborer but also preserves the linguistic authenticity of the region. When transcribing the composition, César Schmidt chose to retain the Caipira dialect it had been composed in, following the methodological guidelines of the time to highlight the deep roots in local popular culture. Here is the adapted text of the song:

A morte de Paulo Virgínio
(Caipira dialect)

Eu vô contá um causo
Que isto foi acontecido
Daquele tempo da revorta
Num vi ninguém resorvido
Hôve muito desprezo de famía
Ficô muito de coração sentido
Sobre a morte de Paulo Virgínio
Que só no falá é duído
No bairro do Taboão
Onde ele era residido
Tiráro ele da casa dele
Ele saiu distraído
Trucéro pr'o Rio Abaixo
Ele veio muito iludido
Na casa do sêu Laurindo
Onde ele foi recibido
Isto era bem cedinho
O sor ainda não tinha batido
Puséro ele na água fria
Logo que o dia tinha amanhecido
Tiráro ele da água fria
Puzéro na água fervida
Geada tava no campo
Que nem sar muído
Se não fosse a revorta
Esse hómi num tinha morrido
Seus fio ainda tínha pai
Sua muié tinha marido
Coitada desta famía
Quanto ela não foi sofrido
Que as farta do seu pai
Pr'os seus filinho querido
Leváro ele perto de uma ponte
Onde ele foi falecido
Fizéro ele fazê sepurtura
Já ele estava distraído
Depois da sepurtura feita
Recramô o seu pedido
Mandô chamá sêu Benedito Maria
Que era seu amigo garantido
E fez a recramação
Do que tinha acontecido
Mandi ele virá as costa
Déro dezoito tiro nos uvido

Translation:
The death of Paulo Virgínio
(English)

I'm going to tell a story
That actually happened
During that revolt's time
I didn't see anyone resolved
There was a lot of family contempt
My heart was deeply saddened
About the death of Paulo Virgínio
Just talking about it is painful
In the Taboão neighborhood
Where he lived
They took him from his house
He left unaware
They brought him to Rio Abaixo
He came very deceived
To Mr. Laurindo's house
Where he was received
This was very early
The sun hadn't yet risen
They put him in cold water
As soon as the day had dawned
They took him out of the cold water
They put him in boiling water
There was frost in the field
Like salt ground
If it weren't for the revolt
This man wouldn't have died
His children would still have a father
His wife would have a husband
Poor family
How much they suffered
With the loss of their father
For their beloved little children
They took him near a bridge
Where he was murdered
They made him dig the grave
Since he was distracted
After the grave was dug
He made his last request
He sent for his Benedito Maria
Who was his loyal friend
And he complained
About what had happened
They made him turn his back
They shot him eighteen times

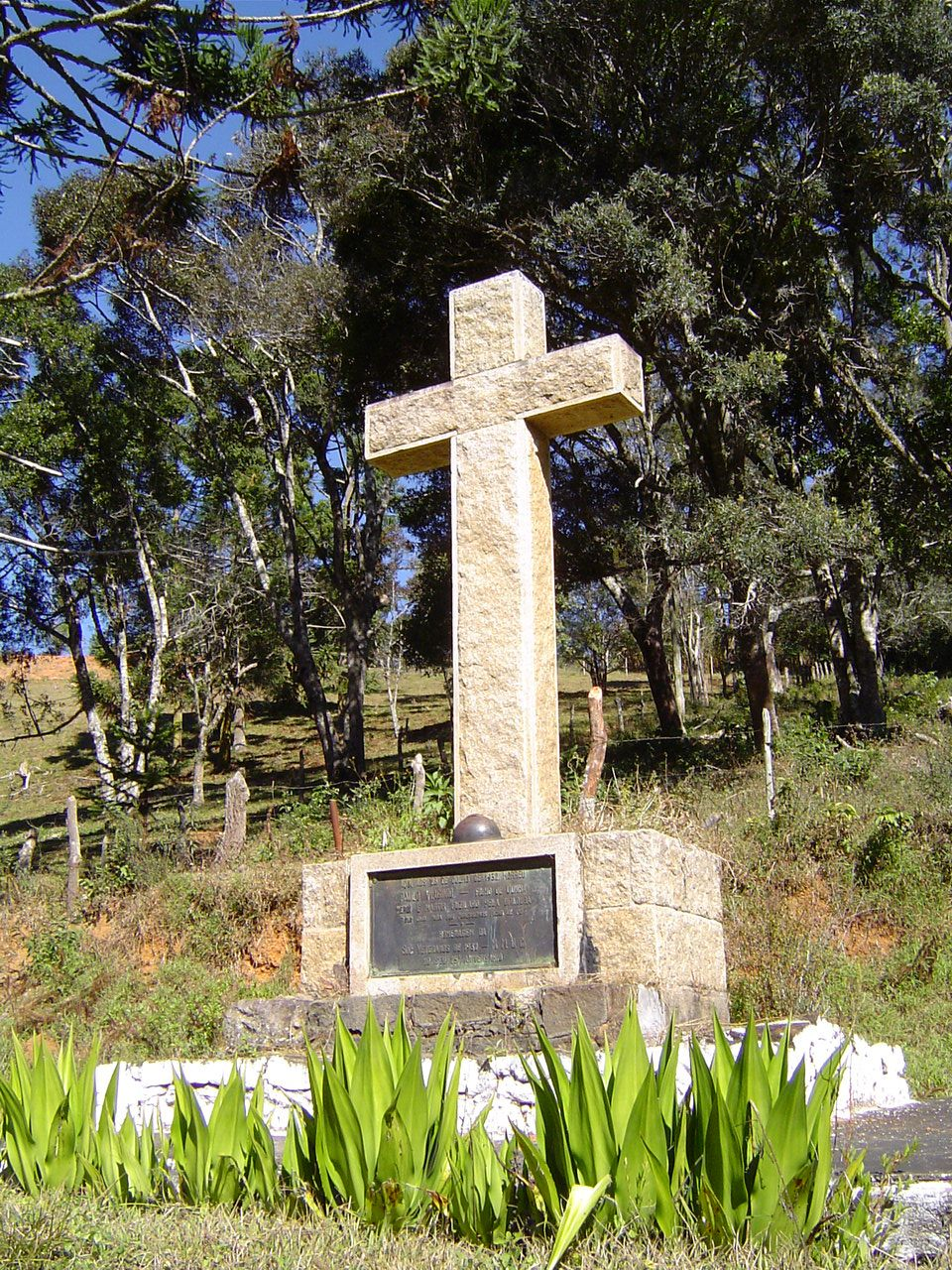
Monument to the memory of Paulo Gonçalves dos Santos at km 56.9 of the State Road SP-171 (Coordinates: 23°08'25.7"S 44°55'21.8"W).

In honor of his memory, a monument erected in the shape of a cross was inaugurated on 22 April 1958, at km 56.9 of the State Road SP-171 (site of his martyrdom and execution). At the base of the monument is the following commemorative description (translated from Portuguese): "On 27 July 1932, died Paulo Virgínio, son of Cunha, hero and martyr, shot by the Dictatorship. He fell so that we could stand. Tribute from the Society of Veterans of 1932-MMDC, on its 25th anniversary". The event also celebrated the twenty-fifth year of the MMDC association's existence. Incorporated into the structure, above the descriptive plaque, is an anonymous soldier's iron helmet, symbolizing the reverence of authorities toward the simplicity of that rural inhabitant.

In the book Cruzes Paulistas, there is a simple, yet respectful, mention that acknowledges the sacrifice of Paulo Gonçalves dos Santos for the state of São Paulo:

Rest, Paulo Virgínio. You shall live, eternally, in the memory and cult of a people, because as long as there is a Paulista heart, you shall live!

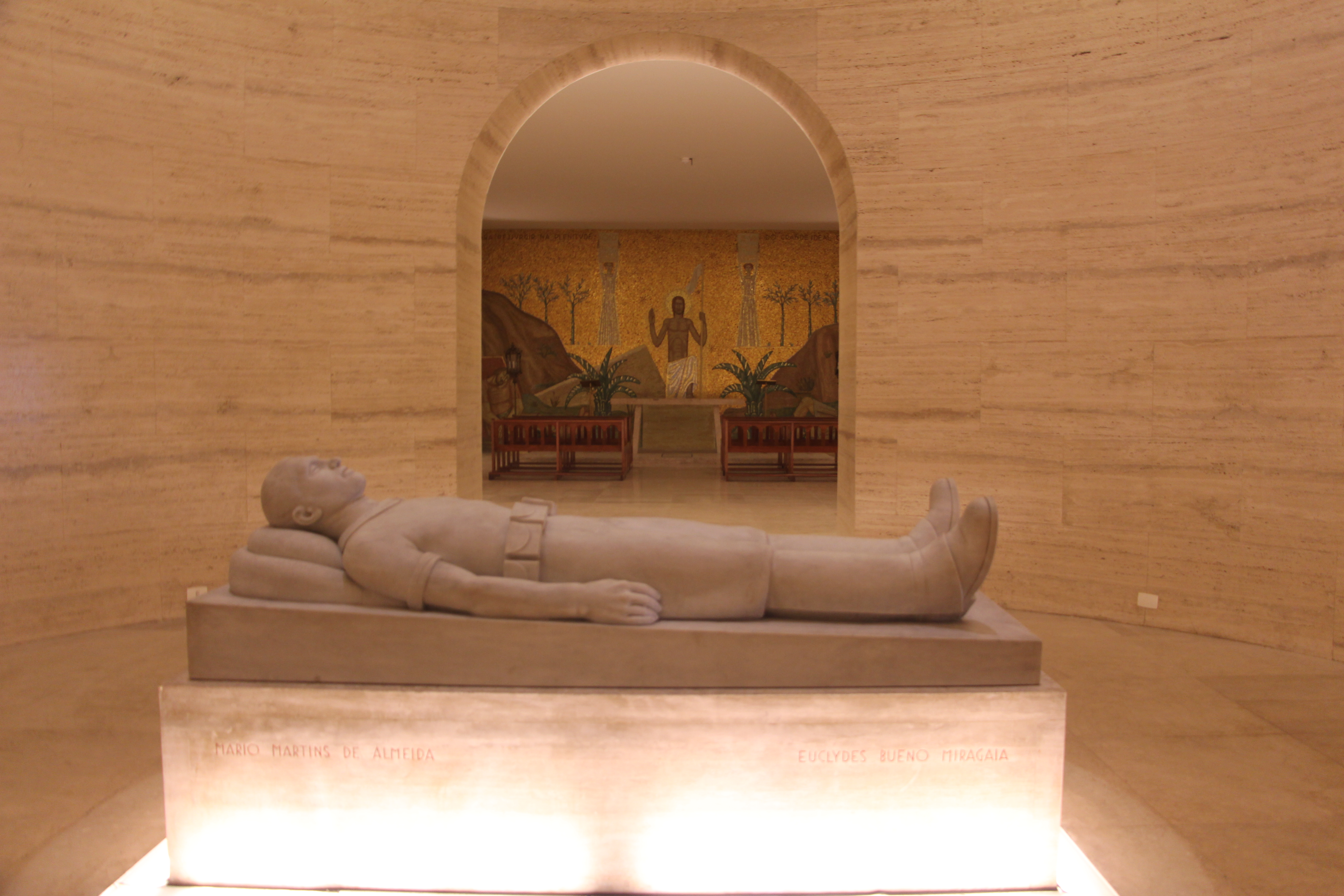
The final resting place of the five young civilians who fell in 1932 (Martins, Miragaia, Camargo, Dráusio, and Paulo), in the crypt of the Mausoleum of the Obelisk of São Paulo

The preservation of the historical record of the young farmer materialized in the toponymy of various public places throughout the state of São Paulo. The first section of State Road SP-171, which connects the municipality centers of Guaratinguetá and Cunha, was officially named the Rodovia Paulo Virgínio by State Law No. 1,585 of 17 April 1978. In addition to this important communication route, his toponymic designation extends to other public streets located in five municipalities: in Campinas (under the Brazilian Postal Code (CEP) No. 13044-240); in Vila Mariana, in the capital (under CEP No. 04012-180); in the Paulicéia neighborhood, in São Bernardo do Campo (under CEP No. 09684-000); in the center of Palmital (under CEP No. 19973-140); and, as recognition in his hometown, in the urban perimeter of Cunha (under CEP No. 12530-000).

One of the significant tributes took place on 3 February 1967, when his name was also given to the largest school in Cunha. Originally created as a "Normal School and Gymnasium" through Law No. 9,719, the institution was established with the purpose of meeting the need for teacher training and intellectual development in the municipality. Over the decades, it underwent important administrative transformations: in 1970, it was elevated to the category of "State School"; and in 1976, it was reorganized as a "State School of First and Second Grade". In January 2020, it became one of the headquarters of the Language Study Center, offering foreign language courses to public school students. As the main educational institution in the region, this state school plays a fundamental role in the social development of the local inhabitants, welcoming students from both the city and various rural neighborhoods and the hinterlands of Cunha. Thus, the name "Paulo Virgínio" has moved beyond representing only a tragic episode of a national war to become a symbol of access to knowledge and progress for new generations of Brazilian citizens.

== See also ==
- Brazilian Constitutionalist Revolution of 1932
- Obelisk of São Paulo
