= Salvador Pacetti and Paulo Virgínio road =

Highway in São Paulo state, Brazil

SP-171

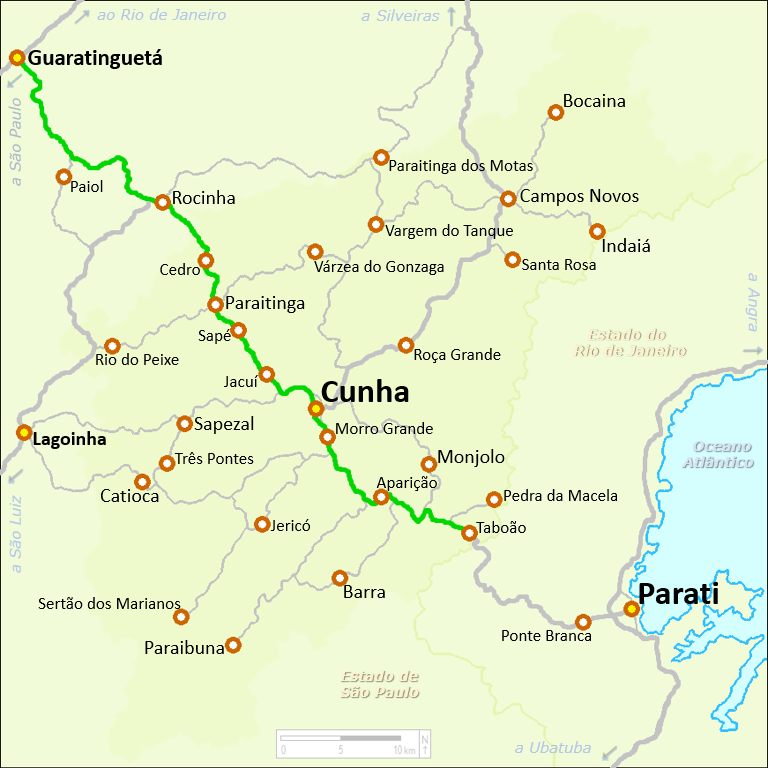

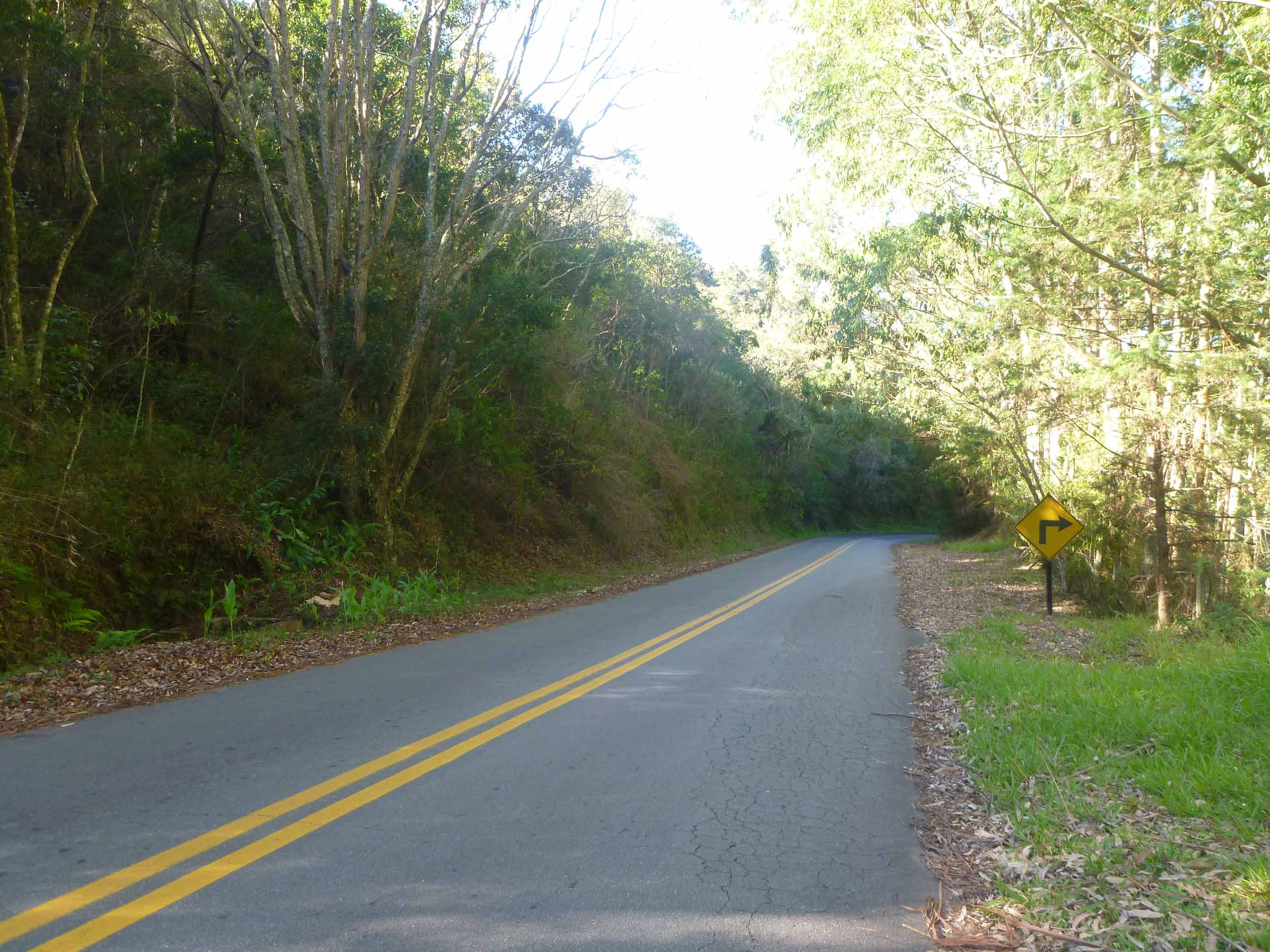

Route information
- Length: 70 km (43 mi)

Location
- Country: Brazil
- State: São Paulo

Highway system
- Highways in Brazil; Federal; São Paulo State Highways

The SP-171 is a State road in Brazil and is under the jurisdiction of the state of São Paulo, connecting the Paraíba Valley to the northern coast of São Paulo and the southern lowlands of Rio de Janeiro. It has two official names: Paulo Virgínio road (from km 0 to km 47) and Vice-mayor Salvador Pacetti road (from km 47 to km 70). In 70 kilometers of extension, the SP-171 connects the Via Dutra (BR-116), in Guaratinguetá (SP), to the center of the municipality of Cunha (SP) and the Via Rio-Santos (BR-101), in Paraty (RJ), through its Fluminense extension (stretching for another 21 kilometers) as RJ-165.

After the inauguration of the Comendador Antônio Cônti Park road (as RJ-165 is officially named), in 2017, it is completely integrated into the federal route of BR-459. Currently, its entire path is managed by the Department of State Roads (in Portuguese: "Departamento de Estradas de Rodagem" - DER) of São Paulo. The highway direction, that is, the kilometer count, runs from north to south and crosses the geographical locations of Paraitinga and Paraibuna rivers, positioned in the upper Paraíba River hydrographic basin; after passing through the Cunha locality of Taboão, the last kilometer (km 70) converts into km 21 of RJ-165 and the count becomes regressive until the Rio-Santos junction, concluding the connection route.

This state road offers access to important environmental preservation areas, such as the parks of the Serra do Mar and Serra da Bocaina. It also interlinks sites and places that compose the Brazilian cultural and historical heritage. Its layout is ancient and dates back to the period when the country belonged to the Kingdom of Portugal: it had become the southern fork of the Caminho dos Paulistas way (also called Caminho Geral do Sertão way) and was part of the Caminho do Ouro (also called the Old Way), one of the Royal Roads (Estradas Reais) of the Colony. Its path, opened in 1596 by Martim Correia de Sá, was part of the route of the first long-distance road in Brazil — established in 1697 by order of Peter of Lisbon (23rd King of Portugal), connecting Paraty to Ouro Preto in 710 kilometers, but, with rudimentary characteristics (as a well-structured trail), serving only the traffic of travelers on foot, on horseback or with animal-drawn carts —. The first Brazilian road built specifically for motor vehicles and properly paved since its construction was inaugurated in 1861 by Dom Pedro II, linking Petrópolis to Juiz de Fora in 144 kilometers. The first documented passage of a motor vehicle between the Paraíba Valley and Paraty occurred only in 1932 by Dr. Eduardo Pompéia Vasconcellos (the engineer responsible for the projects to modernize the route that gave the current itinerary characteristics of SP-171 and RJ-165).

Today, it is the main road of Cunha and is also the largest public way in the municipality: there are approximately fifty kilometers within the Cunhense territory from the border with Guaratinguetá (popularly known only as “Guará”) to the border with the state of Rio de Janeiro and it is assigned the following Brazilian Postal Code (CEP): 12530-000 — while in Guará, the assigned CEPs are n° 12503-021 (in the first kilometers of the road, when it passes through the Pedreira locality) and n° 12503-790 (near the municipal limit, when it passes through the Rocinha locality); and, in the other direction, after the border, it obtains the CEP n° 23970-000 —.

== Development ==
In addition to the main route, when SP-171 was still entirely dirt (without asphalt paving), there were other paths and little information for those traveling between the coast and the interior of the continent. To facilitate and improve the journey, a project by the government of the state of São Paulo was carried out to pave the stretch between the Via Dutra (BR-116), in Guaratinguetá, and the center of the city of Cunha. With São Paulo State Law n° 1.585, of April 17, 1978, the 1st part of the road was officially named Paulo Virgínio road, in honor of the civil hero during the Revolution of 1932. There were still another 23 kilometers to the state border without pavement. In 1984, the São Paulo government concluded the work up to the border, at the top of the Serra da Bocaina: this 2nd part, with State Law n° 4.337, of October 30, 1984, was officially called Vice-mayor Salvador Pacetti road, in honor of the Italian pharmacist who contributed to the construction of the city of Cunha and helped the local population, in addition to having recognized the gift of Sá Mariinha.

Within Fluminense territory, the road route extends for another 21 kilometers with the classification of RJ-165 and is under the jurisdiction of the state of Rio. The Fluminense extension is recognized according to Rio de Janeiro State Law n° 7.556-2017 and receives the name Comendador Antônio Cônti Park road. RJ-165 connects at km 70 and continues entirely within the Bocaina Serra National Park to the center of the city of Paraty. The paving of this 3rd part, completed in 2016 and formalized in 2017 with the said legislation, represented the fulfillment by the Fluminense government of an agreement made in 1954 with the state of São Paulo to pave the entire route from Guaratinguetá to the Atlantic coast. The state of São Paulo fulfilled its part of the agreement in 1984.

As it is the main access to the south of Guaratinguetá and the lands of Cunha, this roadway has intense traffic. Traffic jams are more common during days of traditional folkloric festivities in the region. The Guaratinguetá-Cunha stretch is the busiest and most developed. Due to the incident that occurred on December 30, 2010 — collapse of the track, causing its total blockage —, the route through the Quebra Cangalha mountains (between km 12 and 19) was duplicated in some points. Other recovery and repair works were also completed. In November 2011, the state government invested in infrastructure, especially for the prevention of catastrophes resulting from natural phenomena and to offer greater safety to travelers. Currently, the SP-171 constitutes the last highway branch of the federal route of the BR-459, comprising a long-distance interstate road line between the municipalities of Poços de Caldas, Lorena (connected by BR-459), Guaratinguetá (connected by BR-116), Cunha (connected by SP-171), Paraty (connected by RJ-165), and Angra dos Reis (connected by BR-101).

The zero kilometer of the SP-171 is located immediately after the highway junction with Via Dutra, in Guaratinguetá. From the starting point, it continues through the rural area, in a southerly direction, towards the coast. At km 20, there is a highway junction with the SP-153. And another two kilometers ahead, it crosses the municipal boundary between Guaratinguetá and Cunha. Between kilometers 44 and 48, the road passes within the urban perimeter of Cunha. From km 48 onwards, the terrain becomes more sinuous, offering a route with a high degree of declines and inclines. At km 56, it offers access to the Serra do Mar State Park (Cunha-Indaiá Nucleus) — beginning the stretch within the state forest reserve — and, after another 500 meters, there is access to the Paraibuna locality. At km 66, there is the dirt access that connects to the Pedra da Macela lookout, one of the highest points of the Serra da Bocaina. At km 70, already within the territory of the Serra da Bocaina National Park, on the state border, it connects directly with Comendador Antônio Cônti Park road (RJ-165), leading to the center of Paraty and several beaches. It is about ninety kilometers long (considering the 21 kilometers of the Fluminense extension) in a single-lane track, duplicated in some points. The roadway is completely paved, has no toll plazas, and its mountain route bypasses few urban areas and passes, for the most part, through rural and environmental protection zones. Therefore, drivers must be alert to possible animal crossings and vehicle conditions (especially the brakes). The route also has considerable scenic importance for the natural heritage and attracts the attention of travelers for being a historical route, for its mountainous path, for passing through still intact forest reserves, and for being the route of several trails, lookouts, and waterfalls.

== Route ==
PAULO VIRGÍNIO (Guará-Cunha); SALVADOR PACETTI (Cunha-Paraty)
Type	Indication	km
city	Downtown of Guaratinguetá city (Direct access to José Juvenal Monteiro dos Santos avenue and Sanctuary road (BR-488))	0
exit	Access to kilometer 65 of Via Dutra (BR-116) (connection to São Paulo, Aparecida, Lorena, and Rio de Janeiro)	0
1st part	Start of the Paulo Virgínio road	0
exit	Access to Manoel Abílio Pereira street	0.8
exit	Access to Coronel Tamarindo street	1.5
bridge	Bridge over the São Gonçalo river	2
exit	Access to Morro Frio road and Saudade cemetery	3
exit	Access to Engenho d’Água road	3.8
guard	Suarez Torres State Road Police operational base	6.5
exit	Access to Rio das Pedras road and São José road	7.5
exit	Access to Paiol road	9.8
exit	Access to Brumado road	19.5
exit	Access to João Martins Corrêa road (SP-153) (connection to Lagoinha, São Luiz do Paraitinga, and Ubatuba)	20
exit	Access to Rocinha road (connection to Silveiras, via Campos Novos)	21
temple	Sanctuary of Saint Expeditus of Guaratinguetá	22
city	Municipal boundary between Guaratinguetá and Cunha	23
services	Verreschi gas station (service area)	29
bridge	Bridge over the Paraitinga river	31.8
exit	Access to Paraitinga road and Saint Anne of Paraitinga church	32
exit	Access to Jaguarão road (connection to Lagoinha)	32.5
exit	Access to Samambaia road	35.5
exit	Access to Guaranjanga road	36.4
exit	Access to Samambaia road via Jacuí	38.7
bridge	Bridge over the Jacuí river	38.8
exit	Access to Jacuí road	39.5
exit	Access to Capivara road and Sá Mariinha das Três Pontes pilgrim center (at 13.5 km) (connection to Ubatuba, via Lagoinha)	42
exit	Access to Ribeirão road	43.5
city	Start of the urban perimeter of Cunha city	44
exit	Access to Francisco da Cunha Menezes avenue (connection to Silveiras, via Campos Novos)	45
exit	Access to Mantiqueira road, Lavapés avenue and Downtown of Cunha city (at 700 m)	46.8
2nd part	Start of the Salvador Pacetti road	47
exit	Access to Padre Rodolfo avenue and Cunha main hospital (at 500 m)	47.8
exit	Access to Manoel Prudente de Toledo street (connection to Silveiras, via Campos Novos)	48
city	End of the urban perimeter of the Cunha city	48.5
exit	Access to Catioca road and Abóboras cemetery (at 9.5 km)	50.5
exit	Access to Cangerana road	51.3
exit	Access to Engenho road	51.4
temple	São José da Boa Vista church (at 500 m)	53.3
exit	Access to Paraibuna road and the Serra do Mar State Park (at 20 km)	56.5
cross	Monument to the memory of Paulo Virgínio	56.9
exit	Access to Campo Alegre road (connection to Campos Novos)	58.5
exit	Access to Barra road	59
exit	Access to Rio Manso road	63.5
exit	Access to Mato Limpo road and the Pedra da Macela lookout (at 7 km)	66
bridge	Mato Limpo Waterfall lookout	67
extension	End of SP-171. Direct connection with the Antônio Cônti Park road (Cities and States border)	70 of SP-171; 21 of RJ-165
temple	Church of Nossa Senhora da Penha of Paraty	7.3 of RJ-165
bridge	Bridge over the Perequê Açu river	3.5 of RJ-165
exit	Access to kilometer 575 of Rio-Santos road (BR-101) (connection to Santos, Ubatuba, and Angra dos Reis)	0 of RJ-165
city	Downtown of Paraty city (Direct access to Roberto Silveira avenue)	0 of RJ-165

Research source: This table was created using information available and accessible through Google Maps.

== History ==
For years, during the peak efficiency of the commercial port of Paraty, the route of SP-171 was a strategic path between the Brazilian coast, the Paraíba Valley, the Paulista capital, and the hinterlands of Minas Gerais. For this reason, there is a rich historical repertoire from the times of Portuguese colonization (occurring around the year 1500 Anno Domini [AD]) to the Constitutionalist Revolution of 1932 (in 1932). Currently, it is an important communication route for socio-economic development, especially for the population of Cunha and southern Guaratinguetá. The SP-171 shares the same history with the RJ-165 until the mid-20th century, when both highways began to have distinct developments.

=== Timeline ===
This topic gathers the chronological milestones in a summarized way to understand the existence of SP-171. More detailed sources and information about its historical evolution can be found in the following topics.

Key dates:

- Before 1500: Native peoples use a system of trails that connects the lands facing the Atlantic to the interior of the American continent, giving rise to the well-known Peabiru Path.
- 1494: The Treaty of Tordesillas is signed on June 7. America is divided between Spain and Portugal.
- 1530: Martim Afonso de Sousa begins the first Portuguese colonizing mission to Brazilian lands on November 20. The formal process of settlement by the first Europeans on the American continent begins.
- 1554: São Paulo (the future Paulista capital) is founded on January 25.
- 1565: Rio de Janeiro (the future Fluminense capital) is founded on March 1.
- 1596: Departing from Rio on an expedition to explore the interior of the continent, Martim Correia de Sá and his fleet land in the region that will give rise to present-day Paraty. Using one of the trails opened by natives, he climbs the mountain range until reaching the banks of the Paraíba River, marking the first documented passage of Europeans through the route that would become the future SP-171, initially known as the Guaianases Way.
- 1630: Guaratinguetá is founded on June 30.
- 1667: Paraty is founded on February 28.
- 1695: The Falcão family, together with other Portuguese settlers, settles in the lands at the top of the mountain range, improving them. A prosperous Parish is consolidated in the region, and the route also becomes known as the Falcão Way (mainly in the section that goes from the top of the Serra do Mar toward the Paraíba Valley).
- 1697: The route becomes part of the Royal Roads (Estradas Reais) system of Brazil and is extended from Paraty to Vila Rica (now Ouro Preto), becoming the first long-distance road in Brazil adapted for the passage of caravans or horse troops.
- 1736: The Parish of Falcão is formally annexed to Guaratinguetá.
- 1785: The Parish of Falcão separates from Guaratinguetá and is renamed as the Municipality of Cunha, emancipating itself on September 15.
- 1822: Brazil's independence from Portugal is declared on September 7.
- 1889: The Brazilian Republic is proclaimed on November 15.
- 1932 (05/22): The route is modernized by Eduardo Pompéia Vasconcellos, and the first documented automobile trip occurs between Guaratinguetá and Paraty.
- 1932 (07/14): The Battle of Cunha begins due to the strategic positioning in the logistics of the Constitutionalist Revolution.
- 1932 (07/28): Paulo Virgínio is executed on the banks of the road between Cunha and Paraty.
- 1932 (10/02): The peace armistice is signed in Cruzeiro. End of the Revolution.
- 1954: The Santa Casa (Main Hospital) of Cunha is officially inaugurated on August 22. In that year, the states of São Paulo and Rio de Janeiro reach an agreement to pave the route between the centers of Guaratinguetá and Paraty, dividing it into three parts. The SP-171 and RJ-165 projects are born, which would only be completed decades later.
- 1958: A serious bus accident involving the defunct Viação Santa Teresinha occurs at Morro Grande (2 km from the center of Cunha) on February 10. After the accident, the company São José Ltda. is born in Cunha, assuming the legal concession for public passenger transport on the route between the Paraíba Valley and the Paraty city.
- 1978: The first completely paved section, connecting the centers of Guaratinguetá and Cunha, is inaugurated and receives the official name Paulo Virgínio road by São Paulo state law No. 1,585 on April 17.
- 1984: The second completely paved section, connecting the center of Cunha to the state border, is inaugurated and receives the official name Salvador Pacetti road by São Paulo state law No. 4,337 on October 30.
- 2017: The third completely paved section, connecting the center of Paraty to the state border, is inaugurated and receives the official name Antônio Cônti road by Rio de Janeiro state law No. 7,556 on April 17. This act completed the 1954 projects.

=== America before colonization and Colonial Brazil ===
The current route originated from the widening of trails used by the Guarani (specifically the Guaianás groups) and Tupi (Tamoios) indigenous peoples, who sought the "Land without Evil": according to the beliefs of the original peoples who inhabited the lowlands facing the Atlantic Ocean, there was a place where their tribes could be closer to the sky — considered by them the home of primordial deities, such as Guaraci (the Sun) and Jaci (the Moon) — and live fully, "without worldly evils." Such beliefs encouraged the indigenous people to venture into territories far from their villages, seeking not only resources for survival but also to expand their geographical knowledge beyond the seashore, thus climbing the nearby mountains. Their ways connected with other passages, integrating into a system of trails that would become known to Europeans during the colonial period as the "Peabiru Path". These routes existed long before the European colonization of the Americas and linked the Atlantic Ocean to the interior of the South American continent, reaching as far as the Andes Mountains and the Pacific Ocean. In the mid-1500s, Europeans, mainly Spaniards and Portuguese, used this trail system to explore and colonize the newly discovered New World.

The process of occupation and colonization of Brazil began in the first decades of the 16th century. On November 20, 1530, the reigning king, King John III, delegated to the Portuguese captain Martim Afonso de Sousa (under the title of the first donatary of the Captaincy of São Vicente — present-day São Paulo state —) the mission of helping to improve the American lands belonging to Portugal according to the Treaty of Tordesillas of 1494. In January 1531, Captain Martim Afonso began his expedition in Lisbon, employing about 400 men divided among five vessels. After crossing the Atlantic, they reached the Brazilian continental lands through the region known as Igarassu and Itamaracá (present-day Pernambuco coast) and followed the coast, attempting to definitively establish the land borders (at least the coastal strip) of the Colony: part of the fleet headed north to the Guianas region, while the other part followed south under Martim Afonso's leadership. This epic journey was documented in the Diário da Navegação (Navigation Journal), written by his brother Pero Lopes de Sousa.

Martim Afonso de Sousa's expedition had three specific objectives: (I) to implement order and justice in the new lands, primarily to inhibit pirate incursions and French smuggling on the Brazilian coasts and their influence over the Tamoio people; (II) to explore the interior of the new lands and exploit natural resources of great value; and (III) to establish settlement centers to begin a process of social development between natives and foreigners: it was the first formal Brazilian colonization project, always seeking to increase the Empire's influence to the limits with the Viceroyalty of Peru — which later, during the 18th century, would fragment, with the southern portion giving rise to the Viceroyalty of the Río de la Plata (present-day Argentina, Bolivia, Paraguay, and Uruguay). Via the Atlantic Ocean, in 1532, the Portuguese expedition reached the Río de la Plata estuary and established a provisional settlement on the eastern bank, which would later become the city of Colonia del Sacramento. The imaginary line of the Treaty of Tordesillas ceased to be the only reference for the border between the two powers: the Río de la Plata and its tributaries became a physical border between the domains of Spain (on the western banks, where the city of Buenos Aires would be founded in 1536 by the Spanish military officer Pedro de Mendoza) and Portugal (on the eastern banks).

A few decades later, in 1596, the nobleman of the Royal House, Martim Correia de Sá (grandson of Estácio de Sá, founder of Rio de Janeiro city in 1565), carried out a successive colonizing expedition — similar to Martim Afonso's — but starting from Guanabara Bay and making a land incursion after entering an arm of the sea known as Ilha Grande Bay. Martim de Sá and his 700 collaborators landed at the end of the bay, in an area that would later give rise to the city of Paraty. Allied with the Guaianases people, Martim de Sá's expedition attempted to cross the natural wall of mountains (later known as the Serra do Mar) to settle new locations and seek new sources of wealth, climbing the mountains in that area toward the hinterland: this was the first documented passage of Europeans on the route that would give rise to SP-171. The passage through the trail became popularly known as the Guaianases way and later as the Falcão way, after the regular settlement of Europeans at the top of the mountain range. This name refers to the "Falcão" family, an influential family that, since 1695, pioneered the improvement of lands at the top of the mountain range (specifically the area corresponding to the current neighborhoods of Boa Vista, Aparição, Campo Alegre, and Taboão in Cunha) and consolidated a permanent settlement that, in 1736, would be annexed to Guaratinguetá (founded in 1630) as the "Parish of Nossa Senhora da Conceição do Falcão" (or simply Falcão Parish). According to the IBGE, due to linguistic corruption, it has two accepted colloquial versions: "Facão" and "Facam." On September 15, 1785, the parish emancipated itself from Guaratinguetá's policies thanks to a decree signed by the then governor of the Captaincy of São Paulo, Captain-General Francisco da Cunha Menezes — in his honor, the settlement would receive his name, being officially recognized today as the "Municipality of Cunha."

With the expansion of the Portuguese Empire into the interior of the continent, colonizers began to found new towns in Brazil and travel between them, maintaining an intercontinental exchange with Lisbon (the Empire's capital at the time); therefore, it was necessary to widen the narrow trails, not only for men but also for the passage of horse-drawn troops and carriages. In 1697, the Portuguese government approved the construction of the Gold Way (Caminho do Ouro), officially recording the first long-distance road in Brazil. Thus, the first stretches of the future SP-171 emerged. Between the 17th and 19th centuries, the Portuguese Crown authorized certain sections of the road from Paraty to the top of the mountain range to be paved with flattened stones: this work was carried out by enslaved Africans and free men, based on the Guaianases trails, to facilitate the transport of minerals (such as gold, iron, and diamonds) from the productive mines beyond the Serra da Mantiqueira to the coastal village, where the only Brazilian port authorized at the time for trading products with the Old Continent was located. It also served for the introduction of mules, cattle, and new agricultural crops (such as sugarcane and coffee) into the interior of the Colony, all coming from other continents. Up to the banks of the Paraíba do Sul River, the other sections remained in dirt (compact earth). The route of the Gold Way has a total length of 710 kilometers, connecting many locations between Paraty and Vila Rica (now Ouro Preto).

Starting in the second decade of the 18th century, with the construction and expansion of another official passage (known as the New Way), leading directly from the city of Rio de Janeiro to the towns of Minas Gerais, the route through which the road is integrated became known as the Old Way. With the development of the then Province of São Paulo, the road became the southern fork of the ancestral Path of the Paulistas. Until the mid-19th century, it served tropeiros in the transport of large agricultural production from the region (sugarcane, coffee, and dairy products, for example) from South of Minas Gerais and the Paraíba Valley for shipment at the port of Paraty to other Brazilian and overseas destinations. For centuries, the road would be the only land exit for carriages from the Southern Fluminense Lowlands toward the hinterland, with the closest urban settlement for travelers' rest being the Falcão Parish (current Cunha). After the advent of the Brazilian Republic on November 15, 1889, despite the technological innovations of the time and the introduction of the first automobiles in the region, this reality of dirt roads lasted until the mid-20th century.

In fact, until then, passage through the Gold Way route was done on foot, on horseback, or by cart; the first Brazilian road designed exclusively for modern automobiles, completely paved and allowing for fast speeds (over 60 km/h), was inaugurated in 1861 by Emperor Pedro II and became known as the União e Indústria Road, connecting Petrópolis (RJ) to Juiz de Fora (MG) over 144 km — its layout gave rise to the current BR-040. Despite the presence of motorized machines in the Paraíba Valley since the early 20th century, the first documented car trip between Guaratinguetá and Paraty officially took place on Sunday, May 22, 1932, when a vehicle (called the "First Car" of Paraty) departed at 6 a.m. from Guará, driven by chauffeur Jair Rosa Garcia and carrying two other passengers — the Fluminense public works engineer Eduardo Pompéia Vasconcellos (responsible for designing the current layout of SP-171 and RJ-165) and the mayor of Paraty that year, Alfredo Sertã. The group arrived in the coastal city at 9 p.m. that Sunday.

=== Sá Mariinha das Três Pontes ===
At the beginning of the 20th century, the peasant woman Maria Guedes, who would be eternalized in the memory of Cunha as Sá Mariinha das Três Pontes, was born on June 18, 1882. The daughter of Benedito Guedes dos Santos and Francisca Maria da Conceição, she moved with her family to the Três Pontes neighborhood around 1897, when she was still a thirteen-year-old teenager. It was in this rural and isolated setting, marked by dense forests and difficult routes, that her spiritual journey began through a physical trial. Stricken by a serious illness that left her in such a deep state of lethargy that she was given up for dead for three days, Mariinha was only saved from burial due to the intervention of the healer Dito Juquita, who insisted she was still breathing. Awakening with a sigh at midnight, she followed the healer's guidance to wash her eyes in a water spring next to her home every morning at sunrise, seeking fresh air for her lungs and pure water to aid in her therapeutic treatment, as well as a resource for her subconscious in search of relief for her suffering.

Her "divine experience" occurred during these trips to the water fountain. On the fourth day of her healing journey, while collecting the crystal-clear water with her hands, Mariinha felt a supernatural weight that soon transferred to her back. The mystery was revealed when a small pendant with the image of Our Lady of the Conception appeared on her clothes, an event she interpreted as a sign that the Virgin Mary would be her eternal guide. From her own cure, Maria Guedes assumed the identity of Sá Mariinha, becoming a well-known healer and seer. Over the years, her fame grew, and she began to serve a multitude of visitors seeking relief from "God's diseases" — that is, ailments that the population had no knowledge of or that traditional medicine had not yet mastered, and important hospitals were distant. Not even the Santa Casa of Cunha existed during that period. In her simple and humble way, she served as a kind of therapist or psychologist for the local population who lacked resources to seek a specialized professional; she listened to the laments and sorrows of those who sought her out and, without asking for anything in return or rewards, she offered consolation and advice through positive prose and many prayers, especially dedicated to the Holy Trinity and the Virgin Mary, which gave comfort to those in need.

Her work combined deep faith with practical charity, offering prayers, small provisions (such as lodging and food for those who came to her), and homeopathic remedies — produced with natural resources, without industrial chemical products — which were respected even by the city's pharmacists, such as the Italian Salvador Pacetti, who recognized in her a knowledge that often escaped traditional medicine. The illustrious pharmacist became an influential citizen for the social development of Cunha and, at certain times, collaborated with the city hall. In respect for the memory of Pacetti, his name was given to the second section of SP-171, the route traveled between the municipal center and the border with the state of Rio de Janeiro.

In addition to the healings of the Mariinha, popular tradition preserved accounts of her impressive clairvoyant ability, a gift she exercised with authority and justice. One of the most narrated episodes is that of the horseman who, upon visiting her with arrogance, was surprised by Sá Mariinha's revelation: she warned him that he would have to return on foot, as his horse was no longer where it had been left. This gaze that crossed time and space consolidated her image as a figure who moved between the earthly and spiritual worlds, balancing the relations of power and faith within the municipality of Cunha. Her home became a point of pilgrimage for believers and pilgrims, and the construction of her chapel, officially inaugurated in the 1930s, materialized the center of this devotional phenomenon that united popular Catholicism with ancestral healing practices.

Sá Mariinha passed away on August 29, 1959, but her death did not end her influence in the region. On the contrary, her house and the Chapel of Our Lady of Três Pontes were transformed into an important center of cultural and religious pilgrimage. To this day, travelers and pilgrims who travel the SP-171 road, coming from Guaratinguetá, the Paraitinga hinterland, the Campos Novos area, or the borders at the top of the mountain range, gather mainly on August 29 (the day attributed to the Feast of Sá Mariinha). The legacy of Maria Guedes remains as a symbol of cultural resistance and spirituality, representing the ability of the local population to articulate its symbolic field and preserve its traditions in the face of modernity.

=== Battle of Cunha in the Constitutionalist Revolution of 1932 ===
The passage opened since colonial times had not witnessed relevant events until the third decade of the 20th century, when interventions by then-president Getúlio Vargas resulted in important national repercussions.

On the afternoon of Monday, May 23, 1932, four young men (known as: Antônio de Andrade, 30 years old; Martins de Almeida, 25 years old; Euclides Miragaia, 21 years old; and Dráusio de Sousa, 14 years old) were killed while participating in a demonstration in downtown São Paulo city, which denounced the abuses of Getúlio Vargas's dictatorial regime: this event culminated in the spark to start a civil revolt between São Paulo residents and loyalists called the "Constitutionalist Revolution" (also called the "War of the Paulistas" or simply the "Paulista War"). Vargas's provisional government had been imposed two years earlier (on November 3, 1930), when General Tasso Fragoso (an ally of Vargas), through a coup d'état, ordered the removal of then-acting president Washington Luís, with only 21 days remaining in his term, thus preventing the successive president, Júlio Prestes, democratically elected (with approximately 60% approval of the legitimate votes and support from seventeen of the twenty federal units of the time), from taking office in the Federal Government.

The federal forces (also named "loyalists" or "pro-government") tried to restore order and stifle the resistance composed of military units that were against Getúlio Vargas's regime and civilian volunteers (identified as "constitutionalists", "revolutionaries", or "liberals") against the Vargas dictatorship. The main reason for the demands of the citizens of São Paulo state (supported mainly by people from Rio Grande do Sul, Mato Grosso, and Minas Gerais) was the immediate reform of the Federal Constitution to give Brazilians more rights to directly choose their representatives, rather than having Vargas appoint them. By the end of Saturday, July 9, 1932, all units of the Força Pública (now the Military Police) of São Paulo state unanimously joined the revolt triggered on May 23 of that year, formalizing the start of the Paulista War. In the early hours of Sunday, the 10th, to defend the state of São Paulo, the 4th Infantry Regiment, which possessed a consistent military garrison located in Quitaúna (Osasco), joined the war, allying with the revolutionaries. Pedro Manuel de Toledo was granted office as governor of São Paulo and, as one of his first administrative measures, implemented policies to create battlefronts at the borders to geographically protect the state. Therefore, all routes (road and rail) in the Paraíba Valley were guarded to prevent the invasion of loyalist troops, as the headquarters of the Federal District was located in the city of Rio at that time.

In response to the presence of loyalists at the top of the Serra da Bocaina, the municipality of Cunha became an important armed front of the revolt: with the help of volunteers from Cunha and Guaratinguetá who joined the cause, the revolutionary troops, under the command of General Mário da Veiga Abreu, protected the city and set up camps with strategic and secret positions around the area known as Morro Grande (about 2 km from the city), where they could watch travelers and passersby coming from the border. The Cunha — Paraty road gained prominence due to its logistical importance in the Revolution, and on Thursday, July 14, 1932, the Battle of Cunha officially began — that afternoon, aircraft inventor Santos-Dumont issued a note to the authorities proposing a ceasefire and a new constitution for the country; however, his appeal was ignored.

In the days following the weekend (of July 9 and 10), with the goal of combating the public forces of São Paulo and taking control of the state, a battalion from the Rio de Janeiro Navy Arsenal, composed of 400 soldiers from Rio allied with Vargas, had climbed the mountain via the Paraty road in order to reach the São Paulo capital through the Paraíba Valley: a few days before the start of the battle, the Rio troops, under the command of Lieutenant Ayrton Teixeira Ribeiro, set up camp near the Aparição neighborhood (10 km from the center of Cunha) and studied a way to conquer this first city. Due to the intense conflict with São Paulo, the road had restricted access; any traveler passing through would be stopped and questioned about the reason for their transit (under suspicion of being spies), as civilians had to present a safe-conduct to use those ways. During this period, the Rio troops seized or kidnapped provisions, supplies, and animals from passengers and neighboring farms in an attempt to exercise control over the neighborhoods near the border. Individuals without a safe-conduct or those suspected of having information that could be useful in deciding the conquest of the battle were detained.

In fact, around 3 p.m. on July 27 of that month, the loyalist soldiers managed to capture a group of local inhabitants. One of those kidnapped was identified as the farmer Paulo Gonçalves dos Santos (popularly called Paulo Virgínio): the 33-year-old man, of humble character, a native and inhabitant of that municipality, knew the many paths that exist in that area. On that day, he had left his refuge to seek food for his children and his wife; however, in the afternoon, he was captured and violently interrogated by the loyalists about where the São Paulo troops were positioned along the road and which alternative trails could be used to reach the city. Still under torture, Virgínio did not answer, remained silent, and, before being shot by his aggressors, was forced to dig his own grave. During the night, frost formed, and one of the tortures suffered by the farmer was having icy and boiling water thrown onto his back. In the early hours of the following day, July 28, he was killed with eighteen shots to the back. As his body did not fit properly in the pit, the loyalists had to fracture his legs and his skull so that his body could be accommodated in that hole, without a coffin and buried. According to the testimonies of that fierce execution, before he died, the loyalists "tried" to give a "second chance" to release the farmer and one of the soldiers questioned “What are you?”, Virgínio replied “I am Paulista.”, the soldier, in turn, contested “No! If you say you are a Carioca, you won't die.”, but Virgínio did not waver and continued to retort, saying the famous phrase “I die, but São Paulo wins!”.

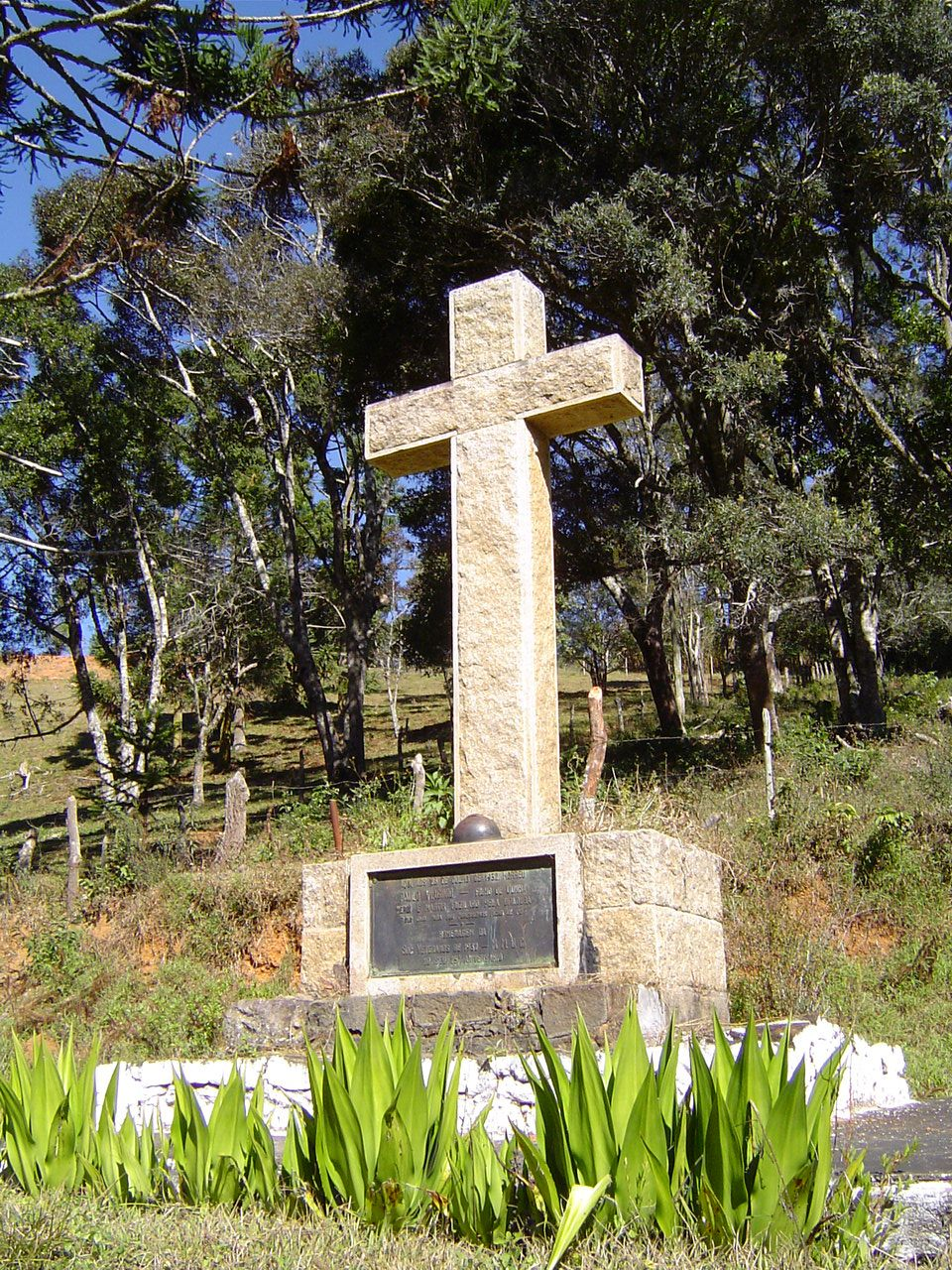
Monument to the memory of Paulo Virgínio

In an attempt to conquer the municipal center through a war assault, the loyalists advanced along the road and, upon reaching the perimeter of Morro Grande, Getúlio Vargas's forces were attacked by Paulista troops. The Battle of Cunha lasted about three months, and here, the Paulista forces emerged victorious by successfully delaying the loyalists' advance through the Serra do Mar and Serra da Bocaina mountain ranges. For not revealing the revolutionaries' counter-attack plan, the farmer Paulo Virgínio was recognized as one of the "Heroes of '32"; therefore, his remains were transferred to the city of São Paulo and currently rest in the mausoleum of the Ibirapuera Park obelisk (along with the remains of the four young men killed on May 23 and others who fell during the war). In his memory, a monument in the shape of a cross was built on the roadside where he was forced to dig his own grave and subsequently executed. The citizen of Cunha is considered a martyr of the state, and his death was defined as the cruelest under the Vargas dictatorship against a civilian citizen with no political or military ties.

The Constitutionalist Revolution was the largest armed conflict entirely on Brazil's national soil, without the influence of a direct foreign offensive. The state of São Paulo managed to keep its borders protected; however, without the promised support from other states (mainly Mato Grosso, Minas Gerais, and Rio Grande do Sul), it could not dissolve Vargas's provisional government. On October 2, 1932, a peace armistice was signed in Cruzeiro — marking the end of the War of the Paulistas. One of the positive consequences of this long clash was that on July 16, 1934, President Getúlio Vargas met the primary demand of the Paulistas, and a new Federal Constitution (albeit provisional) was established. It provided mainly for labor reforms — where the workday would be regulated at eight hours and vacations would be paid — and democratic reforms — making the vote secret and mandatory for all Brazilian citizens, men and women, civilians and military, over 18 years of age.

=== Bus accident at Morro Grande ===
With the end of the Battle of Cunha in 1932, the passage between the states of Rio de Janeiro and São Paulo was left in a deplorable state: it remained blocked for several seasons and was later reopened sporadically by the Public Prosecutor's Office to give the citizens of Paraty an opportunity to have a land connection with other Brazilian locations, though with little infrastructure and precarious transit conditions. In the mid-20th century, the first regular passenger line began to operate: public transport began to be managed by Viação Santa Teresinha.

On the morning of Monday, February 10, 1958, the "jardineira" (a type of early bus) from the now-extinct Viação Santa Teresinha began its journey, departing full from Paraty to Cunha; after completing this first stage, it would continue to Guaratinguetá to complete its itinerary. The person in charge of driving the collective to the Paraíba Valley was the chauffeur Sinésio Aleixo, with the ticket seller and board assistant Jerônimo Cruz. Viação Santa Teresinha held the monopoly on public transport in that area and offered only one service to the Rio de Janeiro coastal city: therefore, to leave by car, all travelers, even those with a private vehicle, were forced to climb the Serra da Bocaina toward Cunha before proceeding to other destinations (including Ubatuba, Angra, and the capital of Rio), as the Rio-Santos highway would only be built decades later.

At the time, the ninety-kilometer journey was made of compact earth, and the heavy rains that had fallen in the previous days turned many sections into genuine obstacles with mud and quagmires. However, as much as possible, the collective managed to travel without interruptions: it conquered the Serra da Bocaina and entered the São Paulo municipality of Cunha, now climbing the hills belonging to the Serra do Mar mountain group. At the intersection with the Catioca road (3 km from the city center), it picked up the last passenger (a local inhabitant named João Ambrósio Mota) and continued its journey. Heading toward the city, the total load of the jardineira at that point consisted of 31 adults (including the driver and conductor).

The collective continued climbing the section known as Morro Grande and, approximately one kilometer after picking up the last passenger, encountered a mud hole. The chauffeur tried to bypass the obstacle, steering the vehicle toward the left edge of the road (toward the Valley), where there was a wooden fence separating it from a ravine. Due to the slippery mud, the collective ended up sliding against some fence posts, resulting in the loss of control of the jardineira, which sped toward the cliff. In a desperate attempt, the driver opened the door and jumped out, followed by the conductor and two other passengers. Uncontrolled, the jardineira left the road, rolling 200 meters down the ravine, taking 27 victims with it. After overturning, the vehicle finally stopped, leaving passengers trapped in the wreckage, injuring 22 and killing 5 adults (one of them being the inhabitant of Cunha who had boarded minutes before).

Within a few hours, the accident became public knowledge, and rescuers and authorities were quick to arrive at the scene. Regardless of whether it was negligence or a victim of fate, the chauffeur, present at the scene, was preventively arrested until the case was investigated — more for his own safety than for his possible guilt, as the population wanted to beat him for jumping from the bus and letting it fall into the ravine with women and children, being considered by locals as cowardly and insensitive —. Some local inhabitants, mainly people living in the city, helped rescue the passengers from the wreckage. There is a report that one of the children (still an infant) was found with slight abrasions in the brush near the road because they cried loudly after being thrown through one of the windows, although there are no documented records to confirm this account. The Santa Casa de Misericórdia e Maternidade Nossa Senhora da Conceição (or simply Santa Casa de Cunha, the closest hospital to the disaster, 2.5 km away) received all the injured.

Despite its official inauguration in 1954, the Santa Casa still had a simple and somewhat precarious infrastructure, useful only for first aid and simple dressings. The medical team present that Monday consisted of only two doctors: Dr. Fued Serafim and Dr. Daher Pedro. To assist in the emergencies, the sisters of the Immaculate Conception Catholic Congregation were called to serve as nurses. After screening and identifying the passengers, it was found that, except for the gentleman who boarded last, all the deceased were citizens of Paraty, as were many of the injured. The official list of the dead includes the following names: Alcídio José Santana; Emília Freire Rubem; Jesuíno Castro Rubem; João Ambrósio Mota; and Miguel Alves Moreira.

As soon as the bodies were identified, the then-mayor of Cunha, Antônio Acácio Cursino, took it upon himself to go to Paraty to inform the Rio de Janeiro authorities of the occurrence — considering that at that time there were no telephone or telegraph lines between the two locations —. As soon as he learned of the terrible event, the mayor of Paraty, Aloysio de Castro, issued a decree of state mourning for the municipality. Still on that Monday afternoon, a delegation formed by the two mayors, the municipal vicar, doctors, and other assistants climbed the mountain to aid the injured and collect the four deceased from Paraty to bury them in their hometown. Arriving at the top of Morro Grande, the delegation could see the wreckage lying in the ravine. The body of the farmer João Ambrósio Mota, an inhabitant of Cunha, was transported to the Paraíba Valley and buried in Guaratinguetá. The survivors in more serious condition were also urgently transferred to Guaratinguetá (45 km away). The news of the accident spread quickly, mobilizing blood donors and public entities from neighboring municipalities: the hospitals of Paraty, Guaratinguetá, and Aparecida offered the Santa Casa de Cunha equipment, such as oxygen cylinders, resources like medicine and bandages, and more qualified nurses for treating trauma. This episode became known in popular memory as the "baptism of fire" for the newly opened hospital in Cunha, due to the number of paramedical occurrences with so few provisions. By the following day, February 11, those with treated wounds and in stable condition were discharged.

According to the inquiry, under the care of the Guaratinguetá police chief, Dr. Wilson Sousa e Silva, the chauffeur, while swerving around a barrier, stepped firmly on the accelerator pedal so the collective would not get stuck and could climb the final meters to overcome Morro Grande. The jardineira responded with a lunge and, by force of acceleration, projected forward, hitting the fence that existed there and speeding out of control. The most accepted hypothesis for the investigation points out that, to provide an alternative emergency exit so that other passengers had a chance to escape, the driver opened the door and took the initiative to jump out as an example, hoping the others would do the same while the vehicle was still in motion. Unfortunately, only the conductor and two other passengers managed to get out in time. Without control, the bus went off the road, tipping to the left and falling into the ravine. After overturning, the vehicle ended up stopped 200 meters below the road level. Another theory (defended by some passengers) says the driver might have fallen asleep at the wheel, resulting in the loss of control; however, this theory is not well-supported, considering the chauffeur had the reflexes to escape the machine. The inquiry concluded that the deplorable state of maintenance of the jardineira and the excessive passenger capacity (with people and luggage) conditioned an inevitable catastrophe: the impact against the fence post was the act that culminated in the misfortune, breaking the vehicle's suspension and interrupting contact between the drive axle and the steering wheel, and the brakes, in turn, were ineffective, leaving the driver without options.

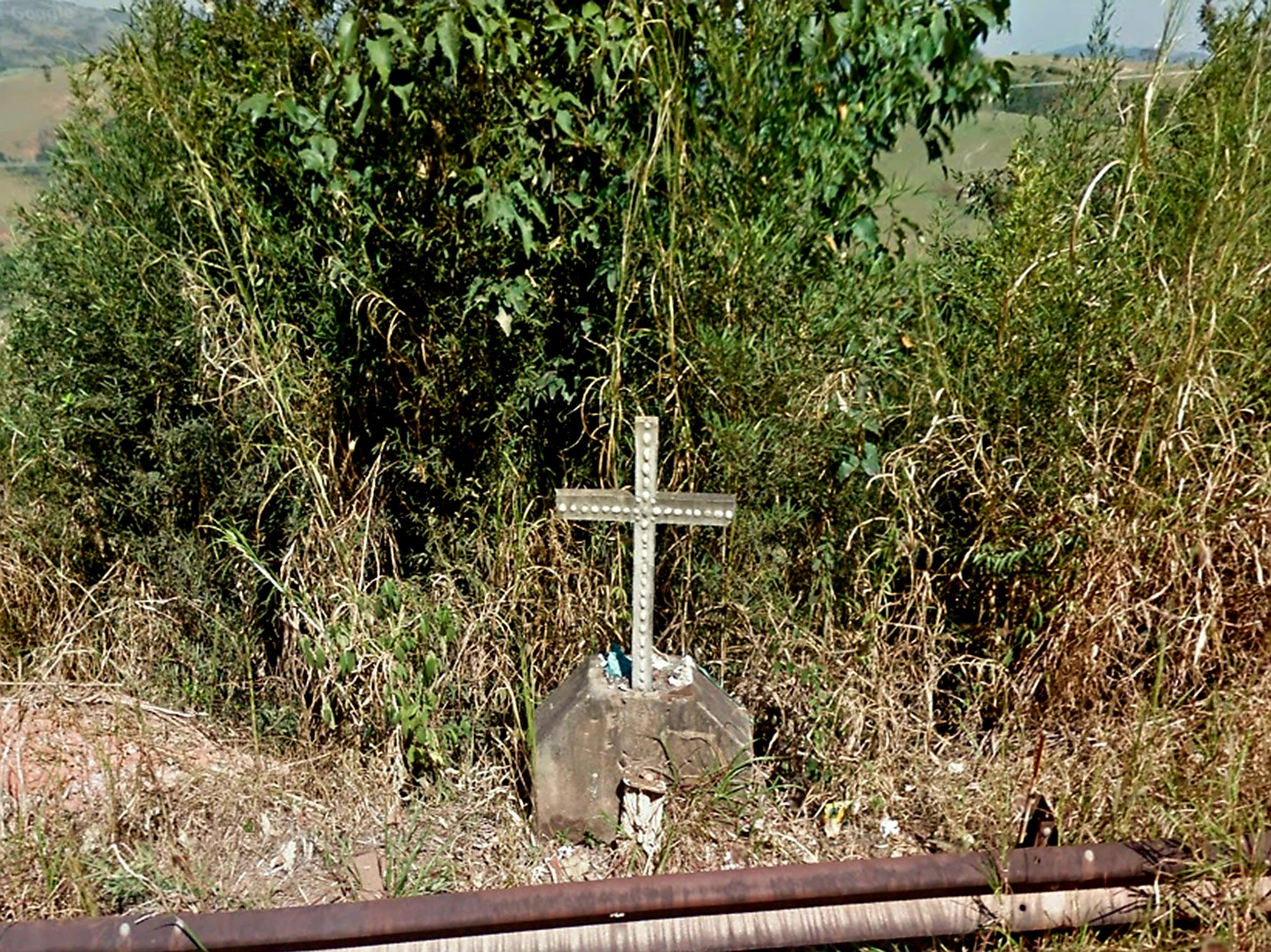
Cross on the edge of the SP-171, in memory of the bus accident at the top of Morro Grande, km 49.8.

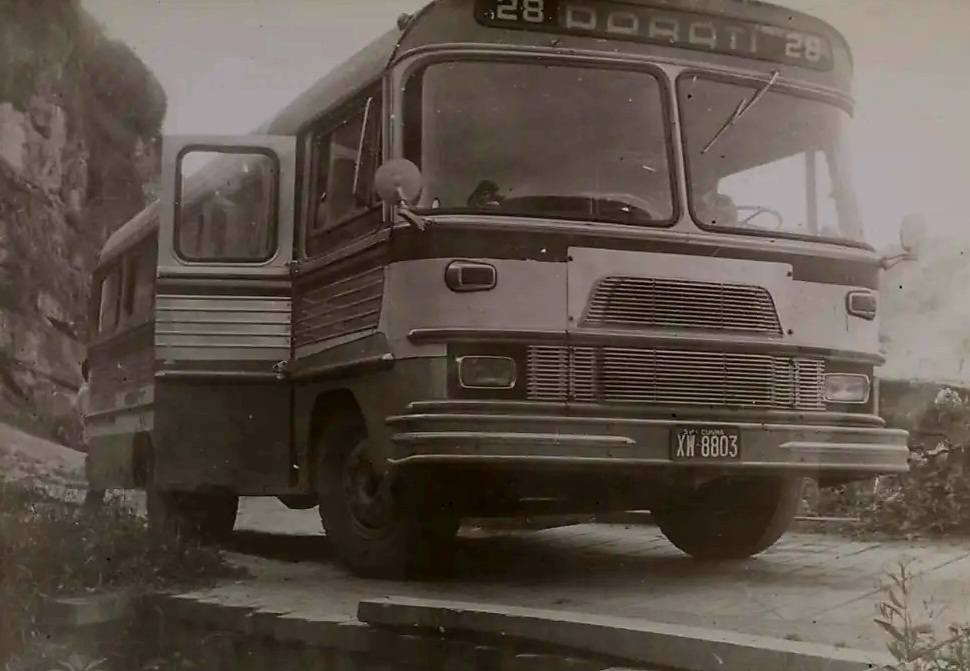
Bus from the São José company traveling to Paraty from Cunha in 1972.

As a consequence of the disaster, Viação Santa Teresinha was penalized and lost the concession rights to transport passengers in the region, and the entire line was suspended. In August 1958, authorities granted the concession rights for the line to the newly founded company São José Ltda., which began operating with only one unit between the two São Paulo cities. A few weeks later, the first bus authorized to circulate between Guaratinguetá and the Rio de Janeiro coast descended the Serra da Bocaina (this circulation is still under the responsibility and concession of São José Ltda.).

Another important consequence is that the accident served as a political appeal to sensitize the Public Prosecutor's Office to pave the entire connection as soon as possible, from the Dutra (BR-116) to the Rio-Santos (BR-101). With the end of the Paulista War (which occurred in 1932), the passage had been left in a critical situation, being periodically blocked in the Serra da Bocaina section, but the two states (São Paulo and Rio de Janeiro) reached an agreement in 1954 for a reopening of the way. With the 1958 accident, both federal units joined efforts with the goal of executing a project to pave and modernize the road: the São Paulo section thus became the SP-171 highway and the Rio section, the RJ-165 highway. After a few years, works began at the highway interchange with the Dutra in Guaratinguetá and developed through the 60s and 70s. In 1978, the asphalt reached Cunha, and in 1984, the state of São Paulo completed its part of the agreement, paving seventy kilometers to the top of the Serra da Bocaina. The remaining twenty kilometers (which currently belong to RJ-165) remained with incomplete paving until the 2000s, until 2017, when the state of Rio fulfilled its part after suffering through many environmental injunctions. Today, thanks to concerns about road safety, there are many signs warning drivers to check their brakes. The old wooden fences on the edges that guided cars were replaced by iron guardrails. The São Paulo government frequently performs repairs and barrier containment works. At the site where the accident occurred, there is a cross made of cement and stones to remember the memory of the passengers who made their last trip with that jardineira, popularly considered "martyrs" for the paving and improvements of SP-171 and RJ-165.

=== Closures due to storms ===
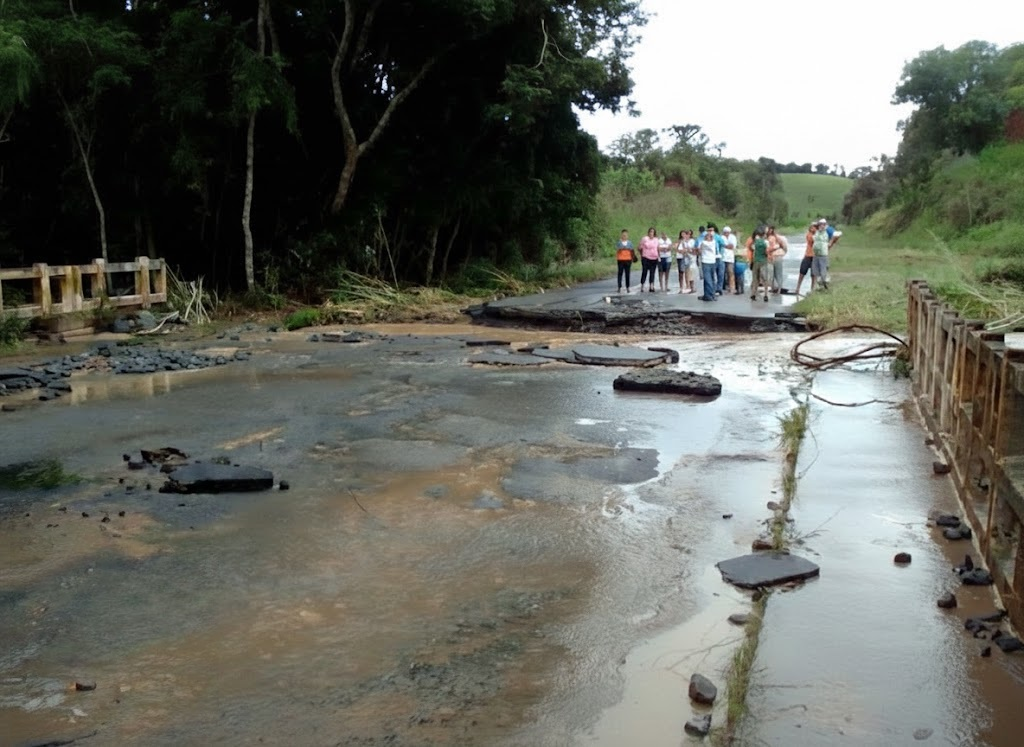
km 39, bridge over the Jacuizinho river destroyed by the flood

Due to the heavy rains that occurred from December 2009 to February 2010 in the Paraibuna and Paraitinga rivers region, SP-171 was closed at several points. Serious landslides and fallen bridges made transit between the cities of Guaratinguetá, Cunha, and Paraty impossible. The most critical point was at km 17, where a part of the highway collapsed, creating a crater: the DER immediately placed guardrails and sawhorses to block the passage, temporarily closing the road. The route between kilometers 30 and 40 was also closed due to the heavy floods that destroyed the bridges over the Paraitinga, Jacuí, and Jacuizinho rivers. Because of the closures, the municipality of Cunha was totally isolated by road. After the rains stopped, SP-171 was in ruins in several places. Detours were made for emergencies, tourist exits, and the entry of support teams to the municipality. During mid-January and February 2010, the passage was subject to closures and detours caused by landslides. Before the end of the same year, the state government completed the recovery and repair works on the road.

== Geography ==
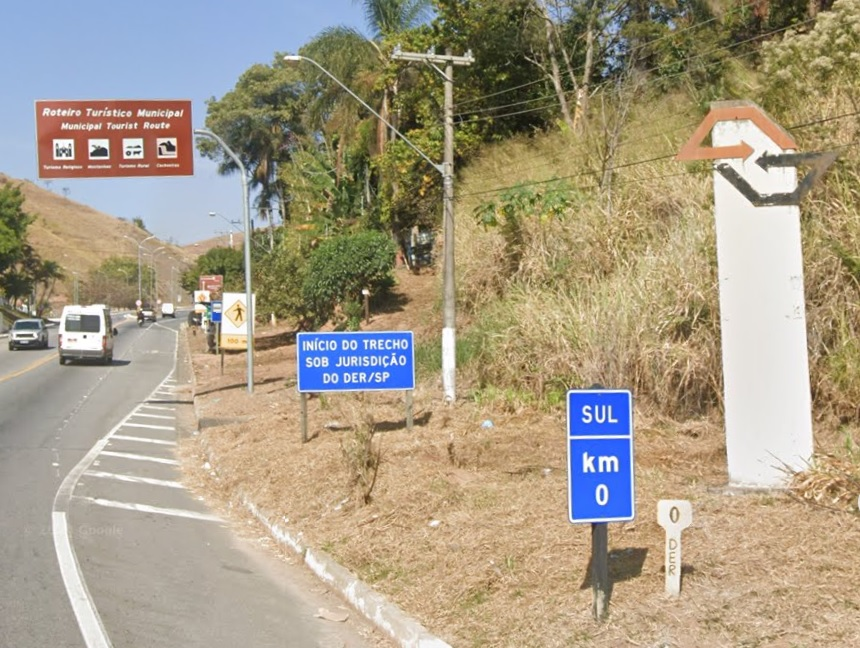
Kilometer zero of SP-171 and the initial stretch of the Paulo Virgínio Road

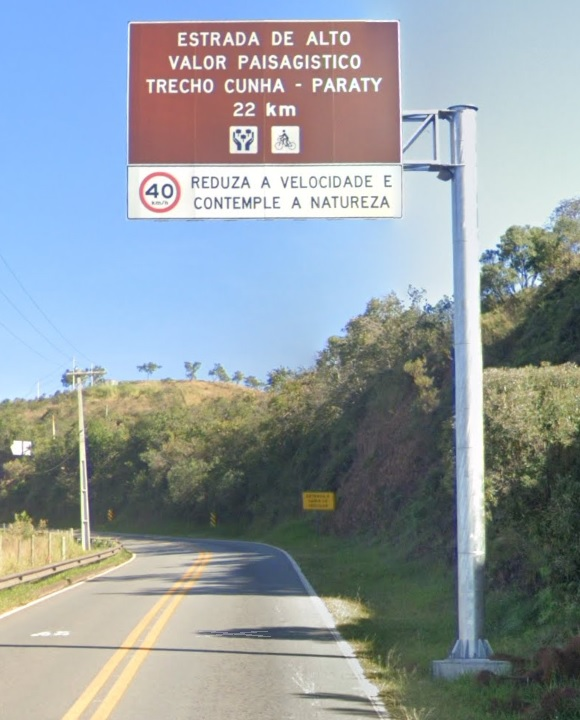
Initial stretch of the Salvador Pacetti Road

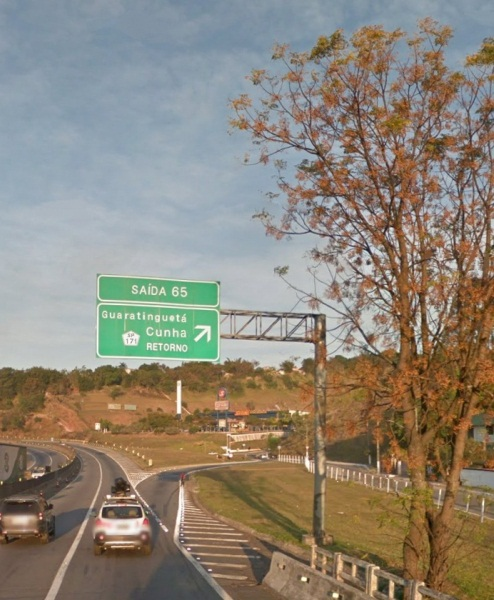
Exit 65 of the Via Dutra, the first access to SP-171

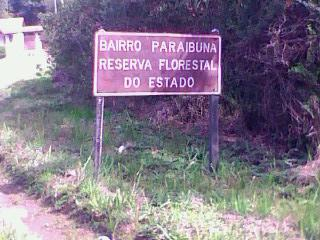
Entrance to the Paraibuna neighborhood

The terrain upon which the SP-171 road is built is part of the geological formation of the Serra do Mar. The Serra do Mar is, in turn, a territory composed of a general chain (like a small cordillera) of mountains positioned to the east of the Brazilian continental plateau, parallel to the Atlantic Ocean coast, spanning approximately fifteen hundred kilometers between the south of Espírito Santo and the northeast of Rio Grande do Sul. The main escarpment ridge is composed of various segments (such as the Indaiá or Bocaina ranges, for example) and forms the boundary between the coastal strip, at sea level, and the Brazilian plateau, with an average altitude ranging from 500 to 1,300 meters, depending on the area measured. The biological ecosystem present in this mountain range belongs to the Atlantic Forest biome.

=== Serra do Mar and Atlantic Forest ===
The segments that make up the main escarpment ridge are discontinuous at several points and receive individual names in certain locations, such as "Serra do Paranapiacaba", "Serra do Quebra Cangalha", or "Serra dos Órgãos". The mountain chain also extends over some portions of land protruding into the sea, such as Ilha Grande (Angra dos Reis, RJ), Anchieta Island (Ubatuba, SP), the Ilhabela archipelago (SP), and many other examples of islands and islets along the coast of the Southeast and South regions. Of the locations connected by SP-171, Pedra da Macela — the natural border between Cunha and Paraty (RJ) — is the highest point, at 1,840 meters above sea level (22% lower than the highest mountain in the entire chain: Pico Grande, at 2,366 m, located in Nova Friburgo, RJ); the lowest point is the starting point (km 0) at the highway interchange with the Dutra, at approximately 540 meters of altitude.

Geologically, the Serra do Mar belongs to a massive platform of ancient crystalline rocks, such as granites, gneisses, and limestones — characteristic of tectonically stable continental platforms that form eastern South America. Most of the elevations were formed about 60 million years ago, dating back to the Paleozoic and Mesozoic Eras, having been formed mainly during the separation of the supercontinent Gondwana. The formation of the Serra do Mar is closely related to tectonic processes, including the separation of South America from Africa and the subsequent opening of the South Atlantic Ocean over millions of years.

Inland, the terrain is steep with deep valleys, often filled with dense tropical forests and winding rivers. Over time, watercourses such as the Paraibuna, the Jacuí, and the Paraitinga (which combine to form the Paraíba river) have collaborated in the formation of deep valleys and ravines in the mountains. The geology formed by these rivers at the top of the range promotes rich biodiversity, with the present tropical forests being one of the most biodiverse ecosystems in the world. The many groups of hills influence local weather patterns, creating a significant effect of fog and rain when sea vapors cool as they pass over the top of the range and condense into dense clouds over the continent.

Historically, the Serra do Mar has been a source of minerals (such as gold, precious stones, and iron), although mining activities have decreased in recent decades. Logging was also significant, which raised concerns, particularly from the Public Prosecutor's Office regarding the conservation of natural resources. Due to its rich environmental value, part of the São Paulo mountain portion was protected by the "Council for the Defense of Historical, Archaeological, Artistic and Tourist Heritage" (Condephaat) and declared state heritage on June 6, 1985. At the federal level, since 1988, according to Art. 225, paragraph 4 of the current Constitution of the Federative Republic of Brazil, the Serra do Mar (along with the Amazon Rainforest, the Atlantic Forest, the Pantanal, and the Coastal Zone) became part of the national heritage. Globally, a portion of the Serra do Mar was declared a World Heritage site in 1999 as part of the "Atlantic Forest South-East Reserves" zone.

=== Conservation Units (PESM and PNSB) ===
Since the end of the 20th century, various Brazilian biodiversity protection projects have been underway, including the creation of several conservation units, such as the Serra do Mar State Park (PESM), created in 1977 under the jurisdiction of São Paulo state, covering 332,000 hectares, and the Serra da Bocaina National Park (PNSB), inaugurated in 1971, covering 104,000 hectares — both conservation units are interconnected by the SP-171 road within their domains.

The PESM is an environmental conservation unit managed by São Paulo state. As previously described, it covers 332,000 hectares divided into ten nuclei distributed among twenty-five São Paulo municipalities, being considered one of the largest remaining areas of continuous Atlantic Forest on the planet, linking forests between the border with Rio de Janeiro state and the Ribeira Valley, near the border with Paraná. In addition to environmental preservation, PESM houses some traditional communities of quilombolas, indigenous peoples, caipiras, and caiçaras. Specifically, the SP-171 highway allows access to the facilities of the Cunha-Indaiá Nucleus, which is one of the PESM headquarters, created to protect and preserve part of the still-intact Atlantic Forest, local biodiversity, and monitor properties with protected green areas. The Nucleus occupies a total area of 14,000 hectares and covers the municipalities of Cunha (which holds 71.5% of the Nucleus area) and Ubatuba (which holds 28.5% of the area). The headquarters is located at an altitude of 1,040 meters, at the top of the Serra do Indaiá (a fraction of the Serra do Mar), and was formerly called the Cunha Forest Reserve (or simply Horto florestal). The park's escarpments allow for a view of the Ubatuba coastline. Since 2006, the Nucleus has been integrated into the "Bocaina Mosaic" (a type of "super-park" created in 2016 that incorporates several environmental parks near the Atlantic between the states of Rio and São Paulo, constituting a protected area of 221,754 hectares (about 547,970 acres). The "Bocaina Mosaic" also incorporates the PNSB.

Created by Federal Decree No. 68,172 in 1971, the Bocaina Park covers an area of approximately 104,000 hectares and significant biodiversity. The park's headquarters is located in São José do Barreiro (SP). It is under the administration of the Chico Mendes Institute for Biodiversity Conservation (ICMBio). It is estimated that 60% of the vegetation is composed of native Atlantic Forest, and the remainder is regenerated (secondary) forest since the 1990s. Currently, the PNSB is part of the "Bocaina Mosaic" area. Due to issues with environmental legislation, the RJ-165 highway (which has almost its entire route in a protected zone) took many decades to have its route completely paved adequately for general vehicle traffic. The Rio government chose to transform the Rio extension into a "Park Road" (Estrada Parque), as a kind of environmental trail intrinsically integrated with the PNSB: thanks to this aspect, both the Public Prosecutor's Office and the DER-RJ can establish transit times and limit the traffic of certain vehicles: large trucks and buses, for example, are prohibited from traveling on the way. Currently, Viação São José Ltda. is the only company authorized to publicly transport passengers on the road on a commercial line, and when performing operations for the South Fluminense lowlands, it uses a minibus system between Paraty and Cunha.

== Strategic Function and Nuclear Context ==
The first experiments on radioactivity were conducted in the 19th century by Wilhelm Röntgen, Antoine Henri Becquerel, Marie Curie and Pierre Curie, among other prominent scientists. The results of research in the following decades were primarily used for military purposes and culminated in the development of nuclear weapons, such as the atomic bomb. Although such weapons continued to play a crucial role in international politics, the civilian use of the new technology gained increasing importance: in 1951, American scientists managed to produce electricity through nuclear fission for the first time, and three years later, Russia inaugurated the first large-capacity reactor. In the 1960s and 1970s, nuclear energy was expanding, and many nuclear power plants began to be built worldwide. The popularity of this technology as a clean and cheap alternative (when under control) compared to fossil fuels intensified with the first 1973 oil crisis. However, critical opinions grew, warning of the risks of accidents and radioactive waste. Despite everything, nuclear technology remains an important source of energy.

In Brazil, the first research was carried out in the 1930s with scientists and researchers from the University of São Paulo (USP). In agreement with the state of Rio de Janeiro and through foreign cooperation with the United States and Germany, the Federal Government managed to build the Almirante Álvaro Alberto Nuclear Complex, which houses two reactors — known as Angra I and Angra II — which were incorporated into electricity production in 1982 and 2000, respectively. The construction of a third reactor, Angra III, has been underway since 2010, after an embargo of more than twenty years. Of all the countries operating in this industry, Brazil became one of the ten nations that master the complete nuclear fuel production cycle.

Due to its geographical location and connection between the South Fluminense coast and the São Paulo plateau, the SP-171 plays a vital logistical role for the region's security. In case of an extreme emergency or nuclear accident at the Angra dos Reis (RJ) complex, the SP-171, together with its integrated local vicinal roads, is officially designated to serve as one of the escape routes. This infrastructure is essential for the coordinated evacuation of the population from the Angra zone, ensuring a flow route toward the Paraíba Valley, where citizens can rely on an effective system with "fast" roads (such as the Ayrton Senna (SP-070) and Dom Pedro I (SP-065)) and important commercial airports (such as those in São José dos Campos, Guarulhos, and Campinas).
