= MMDC =

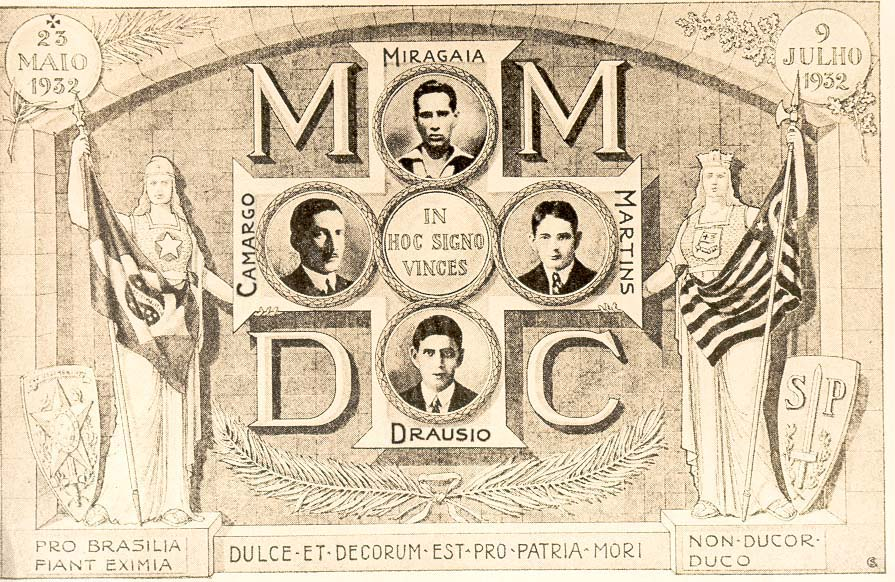
Postcard in honor of the MMDC, with Latin inscriptions: Dulce et decorum est pro patria mori ("It is sweet and honorable to die for the country"), Pro brasilia fiant eximia ("For Brazil, do the best"), Non ducor, duco ("I am not driven, I drive") and In Hoc Signo Vinces ("With this sign you will win").

M.M.D.C. it is the initialism by which the names of the martyrs of Brazil's "Constitutionalist Movement" of 1932, which culminated in the uprising called the Constitutionalist Revolution, which broke out on July 9 of that year, were represented.

== Overview ==
The initials represent the names of the São Paulo demonstrators Martins, Miragaia, Dráusio and Camargo, killed by federal troops linked to the Partido Popular Paulista (PPP), a political-military group supporting the Getúlio Vargas regime, in a demonstration that took place on the night of 23 May 1932, an event that preceded and was one of the reasons for the great conflict that year. The acronym also represented the clandestine organization that conspired for the uprising and later coordinated the war efforts, in recruitment, fundraising and resources, as well as the distribution of these to the soldiers of the Constitutionalist Army.

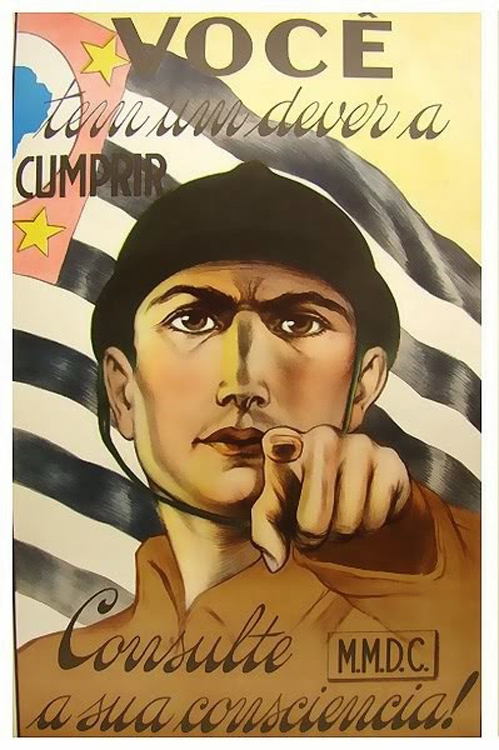
1932 draft poster: You have a duty to fulfill Consult your conscience

== History ==
In 1932, Brazil experienced a period in which the Vargas regime governed without a constitution that formally delineated the powers of the President or that made clear the separation of powers between the National Congress, the Legislature, and municipal councils. In reaction, the Paulistas began to move against the Vargas dictatorship, and students prepared a series of demonstrations, which broke out across the capital in a climate of growing revolt on 23 May of that year.

The Revolutionary League, an organization favorable to the regime of Getúlio Vargas was located near the Republic Square. A group of students tried to invade the pro-government League, which resisted with force resulting in the death of four students, Martins, Miragaia, Camargo and Dráusio died - three of them during the confrontation, and the fourth shortly afterward. A fifth student, Orlando Alvarenga de Oliveira, was injured during the fight did not have his name immediately associated with the movement since he died three months later on 12 August, 1932.

Following the episode of Republic Square, an intense campaign of voluntary enlistment throughout the state commenced on July 9, 1932, culminating in the 1932 Constitutionalist Revolution. The initials of Martins, Miragaia, Camargo and Dráusio, M.M.D.C, were used to represent a secret civil organisation which, among other activities, offered military training to the Paulista guerrillas.

== M.M.D.C.A. ==
Some historians use the initialism "M.M.D.C.A." in honor of Orlando de Oliveira Alvarenga, who died of his wounds three months after the clash in August 1932. To honor him, the state government created the "Colar Cruz de Alvarenga e dos Heróis Anônimos" ("Necklace Cross of Alvarenga and Anonymous Heroes"). On January 13, 2004, State Law 11.658 was enacted, styling May 23 as "Dia dos Heróis MMDCA" ("MMDCA Heroes Day").

== Toponymy ==
Streets named Martins, Miragaia, Dráusio, Camargo, Alvarenga and MMDC intersect in the neighborhood of Butantã. Escola M.M.D.C. is a school located in the São Paulo neighborhood of Mooca. Streets honoring Martins, Miragaia, Dráusio, and Camargo exist in the cities of Campinas, Cotia, Franca, Itaquaquecetuba, Leme, Lorena, Piracicaba, São Bernardo do Campo, Pauliceia (in a neighborhood where an obelisk with the initials MMDC is also located), São José dos Campos, São José do Rio Preto, Sorocaba and Votorantim, as well as plazas in the cities of Bauru, Jundiaí, Lorraine and São Carlos.

== M.M.D.C. Medal ==
In 1962, in commemoration of the 30th anniversary of the Constitutionalist Revolution, the distinction known as the "M.M.D.C. Medal" was created. by the "Veterans Society of 32 - MMDC" and made official by the state government by decree 40,087/1962.
