= Obelisk of São Paulo =

- Obelisco de São Paulo
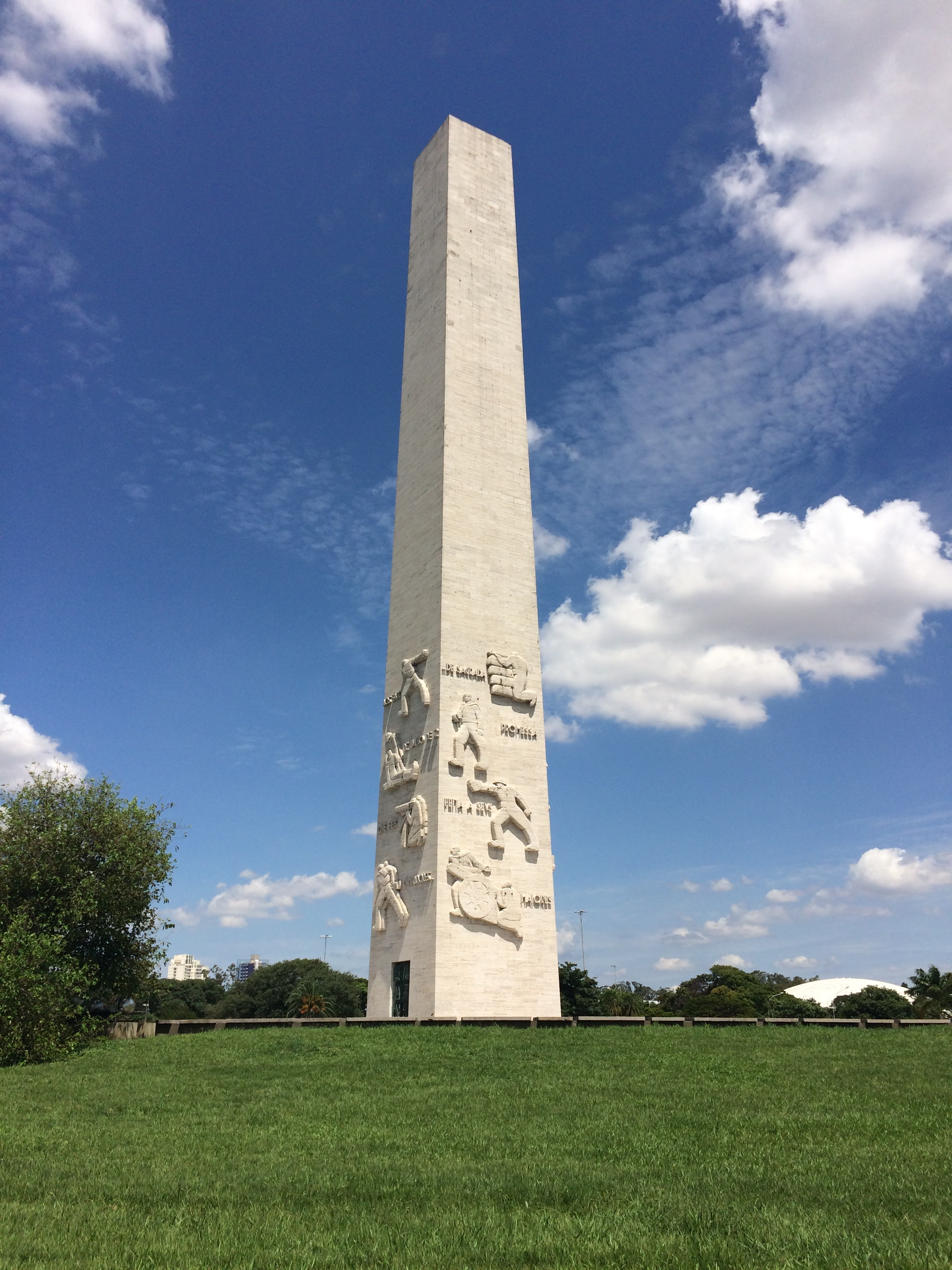
- Obelisk of São Paulo
- Interactive map of Obelisk of São Paulo
- Location: São Paulo, Brazil
- Coordinates: 23°35′05″S 46°39′17″W
- Designer: Galileo Ugo Emendabili
- Type: Obelisk
- Material: Travertine marble
- Height: 72 m (236 ft 3 in)
- Beginning date: 1947
- Completion date: 1970
- Opening date: July 9, 1955
- Dedicated to: The victims of the Constitutionalist Revolution of 1932

Obelisk of São Paulo (in Portuguese: Obelisco de São Paulo) or Obelisk of Ibirapuera (in Portuguese: Obelisco do Ibirapuera) is an obelisk in Ibirapuera Park in the city of São Paulo, Brazil.

This monument is a symbol of the Constitutionalist Revolution of 1932, and the biggest monument of the city of São Paulo. The height of the monument is 72 meters (236 ft 3 in). The construction of the monument was started in 1947 and completed in 1970.

The obelisk is a project of the Italian-Brazilian sculptor Galileo Ugo Emendabili, who arrived in Brazil in 1923. The obelisk, made with pure travertine marble, was inaugurated on July 9, 1955, one year after the inauguration of Ibirapuera Park.

== See also ==
- Obelisco de Buenos Aires
