= Tourism in Brazil =

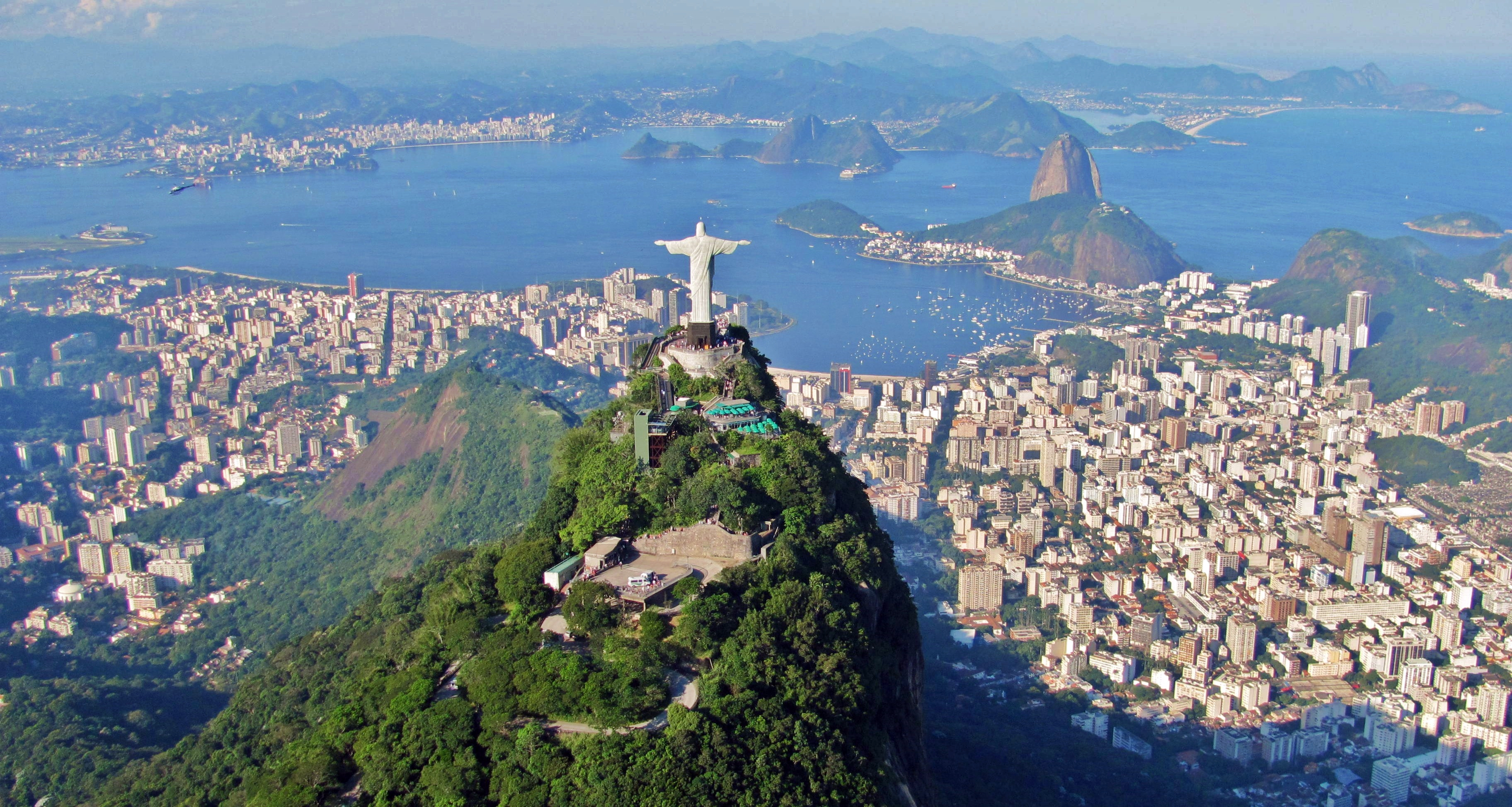
Rio de Janeiro, the most visited destination in Brazil by foreign tourists for leisure trips, and second place for business travel

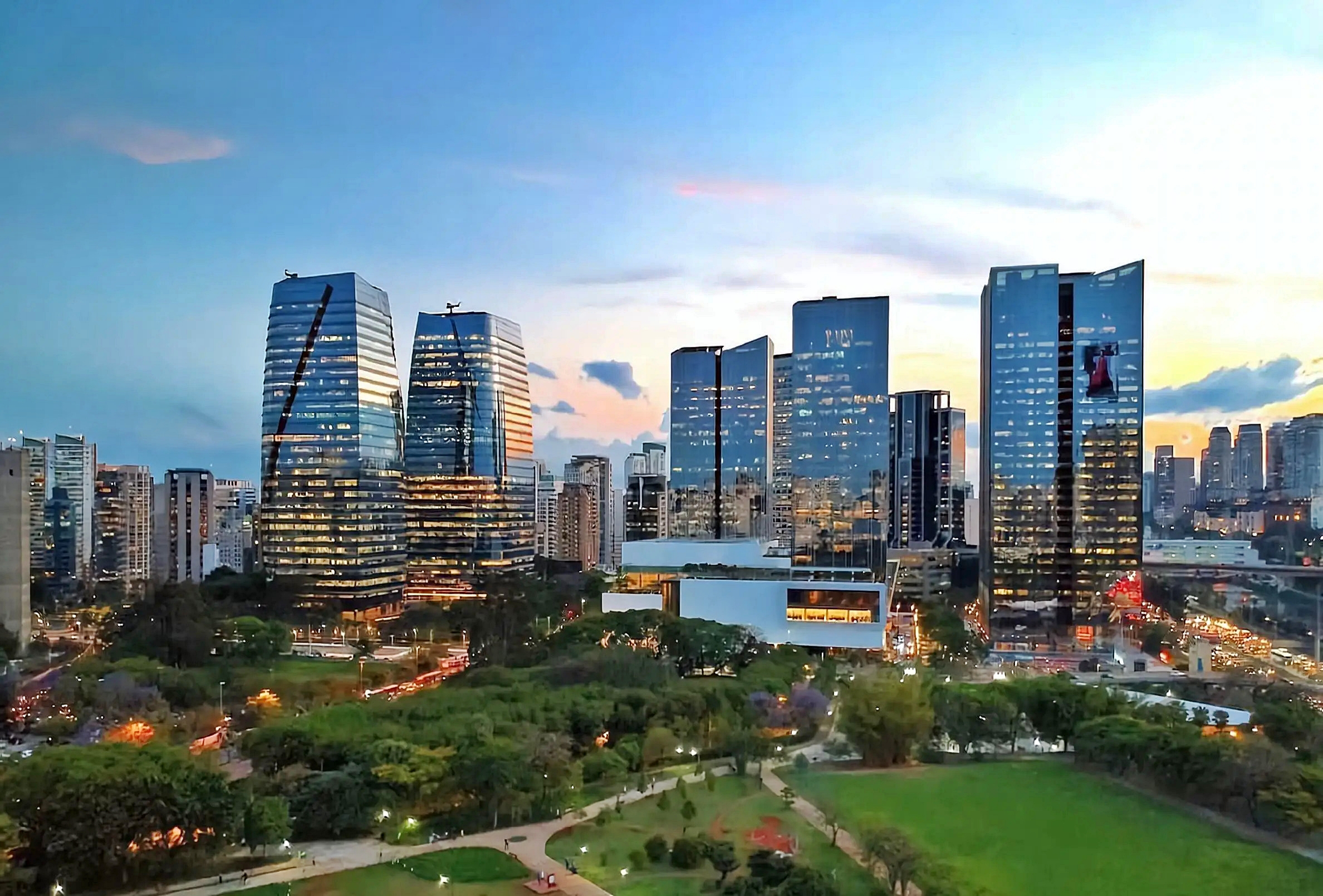
São Paulo is the most visited city in Brazil, being the number one city for those looking for business, events, gastronomy, cultural tourism and a vibrant nightlife.

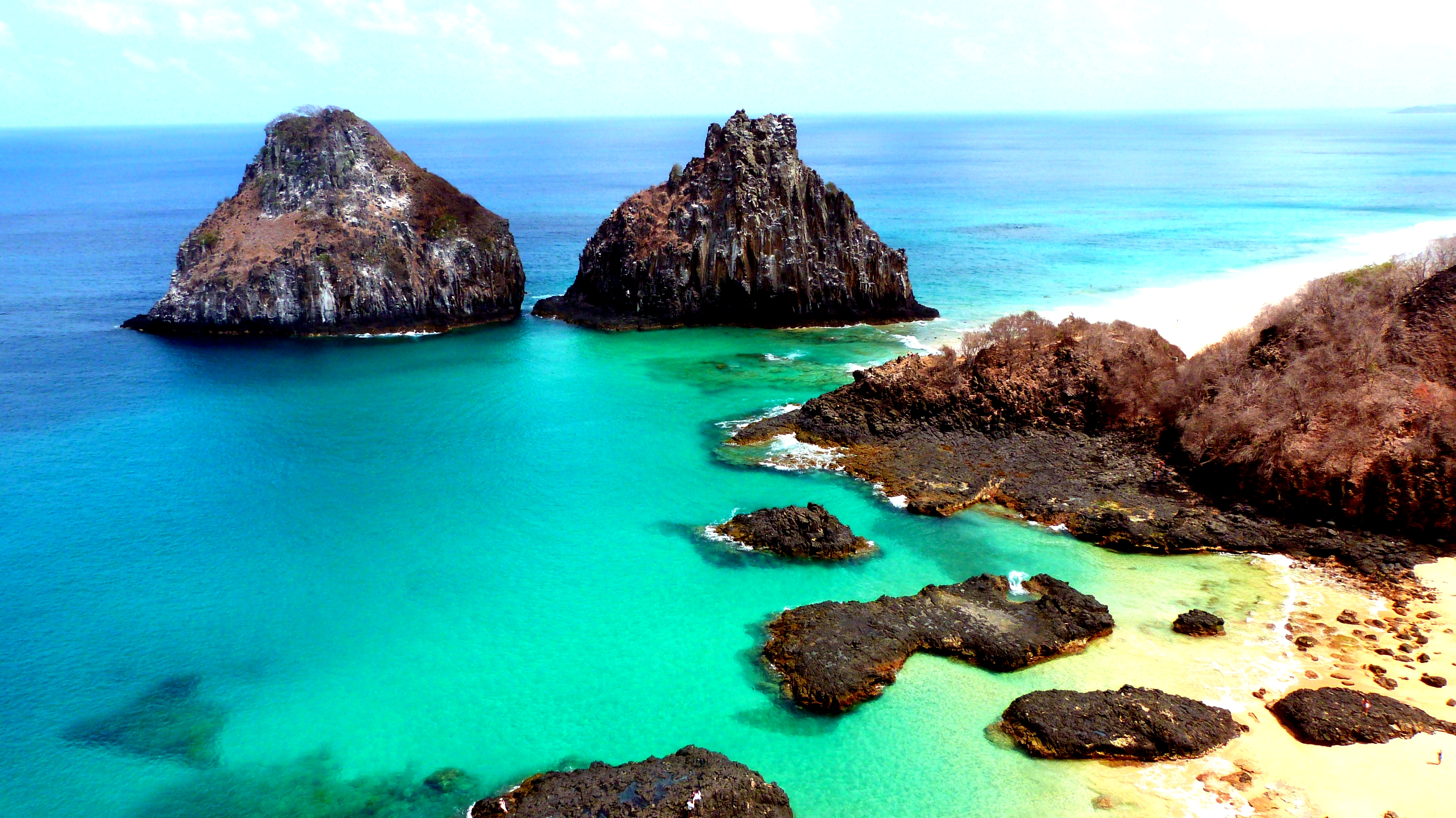
Sancho Bay, Fernando de Noronha, elected the most beautiful beach in the world by TripAdvisor

Tourism in Brazil is a growing sector and key to the economy of several regions of the country. It had 9.28 million visitors in 2025, an increase of 32% compared to 2024, ranking in terms of the international tourist arrivals as the second main destination in Latin America after Mexico. Revenues from international tourists reached US$7.9 billion (R$41.5 billion), an increase of 7.1% over 2024, according to data from the foreign sector statistics report released by the Central Bank (Bacen).

Brazil offers for both domestic and international tourists an ample range of options, with natural areas being its most popular tourism product, a combination of leisure and recreation, mainly sun and beach, and adventure travel, as well as historic and cultural tourism. Among the most popular destinations are beaches at Rio de Janeiro and Santa Catarina, business trips to São Paulo city, cultural and historic tourism in Minas Gerais, the Iguazu Falls and the Pantanal in the Center-West Region.

In terms of the 2024 Travel and Tourism Competitiveness Index (TTCI), which is a measurement of the factors that make it attractive to develop business in the travel and tourism industry of individual countries, Brazil ranked in the 26th place at the world's level, third in the Americas, after Canada and United States. Brazil’s main competitive advantages are its natural resources, which ranked 3rd on this criterion out of all countries considered in the Americas, and ranked 2nd for its cultural resources, due to its many World Heritage Sites. The 2013 TTCI report also notes Brazil's main weaknesses: its ground transport infrastructure remains underdeveloped (ranked 129th), with the quality of roads ranking in the 121st place, and quality of air transport infrastructure in 131st; and the country continues to suffer from a lack of price competitiveness (ranked 126th), due in part to high and increasing ticket taxes and airport charges, as well as high and rising prices more generally. Safety and security improved significantly between 2008 and 2013, moving from 128th to 73rd place, before slipping to 106th by 2017.

== International tourism ==
Tourist arrivals of 2024 in %

Historical international tourism arrivals 1995-2019
Year	International tourist arrivals (x1000)	Annual growth (%)	Total revenue (millions USD)	Annual growth (%)
1995	1,991	-	972	-
2000	5,313	-	1,810	-
2003	4,133	-	2,479	-
2004	4,794	16.0	3,222	30.0
2005	5,358	11.8	3,861	19.8
2006	5,019	-6.3	4,316	1.1
2007	5,025	0.1	4,953	14.8
2008	5,050	0.5	5,780	16.7
2009	4,802	-4.9	5,305	-8.2
2010	5,161	7.5	5,702	7.5
2011	5,433	5.3	6,555	14.9
2012	5,677	4.5	6,645	1.3
2013	5,813	2.4	6,704	0.9
2014	6,430	n/a	n/a	n/a
2015	6,306	n/a	n/a	n/a
2016	6,578	n/a	n/a	n/a
2017	6,589	0.6	5,809	n/a
2018	6,621	0.5	5,921	n/a
2019	6,353	-4.4	5,995	n/a

Yearly tourist arrivals in millions

According to the World Tourism Organization, international travel to Brazil began to grow fast since 2000, particularly during 2004 and 2005. However, in 2006 a slow down took place, and international arrivals have had almost no growth both in 2007 and 2008. In spite of this trend, revenues from international tourism continued to rise, from US$3.9 billion in 2005 to US$4.9 billion in 2007, a US$1 billion increase despite 333,000 less arrivals. This favorable trend is the result of the strong devaluation of the American dollar against the Brazilian real, which began in 2004, but on the other hand, making Brazil a more expensive international destination. This trend changed in 2009, when both visitors and revenues fell as a result of the 2008–2009 economic crisis. By 2010, the industry recovered, and arrivals grew above 2006 levels to 5.16 million international visitors, and receipts from these visitors reached US$5.9 billion. In 2012, the historical record was reached with 5.6 million visitors and US$6.6 billion in receipts.

Despite continuing record breaking of international tourism revenues, the number of Brazilian tourists travelling overseas has been growing steadily since 2003, resulting in a net negative foreign exchange balance, as more money is spent abroad by Brazilian than receipts from international tourist visiting Brazil. Tourism expenditures abroad grew from US$5.76 billion in 2006, to US$8.21 billion in 2007, a 42.45% increase, representing a net deficit of US$3.26 billion in 2007, as compared to US$1.45 billion in 2006, a 125% increase from the previous year. This trend is caused by Brazilians taking advantage of the stronger Real to travel and making relatively cheaper expenditures abroad. Brazilian traveling overseas in 2006 represented 3.9% of the country's population.

In 2005, tourism contributed with 3.2% of the country's revenues from exports of goods and services, and represented 7% of direct and indirect employment in the Brazilian economy. In 2006, direct employment in the sector reached 1.87 million people. Domestic tourism is a fundamental market segment for the industry, as 51 million traveled throughout the country in 2005, and direct revenues from Brazilian tourists reached US$21.8 billion, 5.6 times more receipts than international tourists in 2005.

In 2005, Rio de Janeiro, Foz do Iguaçu, São Paulo, Florianópolis, and Salvador were the most visited cities by international tourists for leisure trips. The most popular destinations for business trips were São Paulo, Rio de Janeiro, and Porto Alegre. In 2006, Rio de Janeiro and Fortaleza were the most popular destinations by national visitors.

Main destinations visited by international leisure tourists in 2019 Top 10 ranking by number of visitors			Main destinations visited by national leisure tourists in 2020 Top 10 ranking by number of visitors		
Ranking (2019)	Destination	State	Ranking (2020)	Destination	State
1st	Rio de Janeiro	RJ	1st	Rio de Janeiro	RJ
2nd	Florianópolis	SC	2nd	São Paulo	SP
3rd	Foz do Iguaçu	PR	3rd	Maceió	AL
4th	São Paulo	SP	4th	Gramado	RS
5th	Armação dos Búzios	RJ	5th	Fortaleza	CE
6th	Salvador	BA	6th	Natal	RN
7th	Bombinhas	SC	7th	Foz do Iguaçu	PR
8th	Angra dos Reis	RJ	8th	Porto de Galinhas	PE
9th	Balneário Camboriú	SC	9th	Salvador	BA
10th	Paraty	RJ	10th	Florianópolis	SC

== Visitor statistics ==
Visitors arriving in Brazil, by country of residence
Country	2025	2024	2023	2022	2021	2020	2019	2018	2017	2016	2015	2014	2013	2012	2011
Argentina	3,386,823 ▲	1,960,182 ▲	1,882,240 ▲	1,032,762 ▲	67,280 ▼	887,805 ▼	1,954,725 ▼	2,498,483 ▼	2,622,327 ▲	2,294,900 ▲	2,079,823 ▲	1,743,930 ▲	1,711,491 ▲	1,671,604 ▲	1,593,775 ▲
United States	759,637 ▲	728,537 ▲	668,478 ▲	441,007 ▲	132,182 ▼	172,105 ▼	590,520 ▲	538,532 ▲	475,232 ▼	570,350 ▼	575,796 ▼	656,801 ▲	592,827 ▲	586,463 ▼	594,947 ▼
Chile	801,921 ▲	653,895 ▲	458,576 ▲	202,470 ▲	46,673 ▼	131,174 ▼	391,689 ▲	387,470 ▲	342,143 ▲	311,813 ▲	306,331 ▼	336,950 ▲	268,203 ▲	250,586 ▲	217,200 ▲
Paraguay	528,554 ▲	465,020 ▲	424,460 ▲	308,234 ▲	132,126 ▲	122,981 ▼	406,526 ▲	356,897 ▲	336,646 ▲	316,714 ▲	301,831 ▲	293,841 ▲	268,932 ▲	246,401 ▲	192,730 ▼
Uruguay	524,729 ▲	388,464 ▲	334,703 ▲	180,064 ▲	11,575 ▼	113,714 ▼	364,830 ▲	348,336 ▲	328,098 ▲	284,113 ▲	267,321 ▲	223,508 ▼	262,512 ▲	253,864 ▼	261,204 ▲
France	293,008 ▲	235,163 ▲	187,559 ▲	130,910 ▲	34,848 ▼	70,369 ▼	257,504 ▲	238,345 ▼	254,153 ▼	263,774 ▲	261,075 ▼	282,375 ▲	224,078 ▲	218,626 ▲	207,890 ▲
Portugal	273,483 ▲	218,354 ▲	182,463 ▲	149,747 ▲	38,704 ▼	51,028 ▼	176,229 ▲	145,816 ▲	144,095 ▼	149,968 ▼	162,305 ▼	170,066 ▲	168,250 ▼	168,649 ▼	183,728 ▼
Germany	209,854 ▲	182,166 ▲	158,582 ▲	120,670 ▲	29,514 ▼	61,149 ▼	206,882 ▼	209,039 ▲	203,045 ▼	221,513 ▼	224,549 ▼	265,498 ▲	236,505 ▼	258,437 ▲	241,739 ▲
Italy	190,342 ▲	154,495 ▲	129,447 ▲	86,766 ▲	18,907 ▼	45,646 ▼	182,587 ▲	175,763 ▲	171,654 ▼	181,493 ▼	202,015 ▼	228,734 ▼	233,243 ▲	230,114 ▲	229,484 ▼
United Kingdom	187,396 ▲	153,754 ▲	130,239 ▲	87,909 ▲	9,809 ▼	48,595 ▼	163,425 ▲	154,586 ▼	185,858 ▼	202,671 ▲	189,269 ▼	217,003 ▲	169,732 ▲	155,548 ▲	149,564 ▼
Spain	160,484 ▲	132,484 ▲	114,096 ▲	83,745 ▲	22,828 ▼	32,665 ▼	145,325 ▼	147,159 ▲	137,202 ▼	147,846 ▼	151,029 ▼	166,759 ▼	169,751 ▼	180,406 ▼	190,392 ▲
Peru	175,418 ▲	131,368 ▲	99,353 ▲	61,634 ▲	13,077 ▼	33,895 ▼	135,880 ▲	121,326 ▲	115,320 ▲	114,276 ▲	113,078 ▼	117,230 ▲	98,602 ▲	91,996 ▲	86,795 ▲
Bolivia	128,494 ▲	129,992 ▲	123,803 ▲	90,694 ▲	26,330 ▼	45,449 ▼	132,069 ▲	126,253 ▼	126,781 ▼	138,106 ▲	108,149 ▲	95,300 ▲	95,028 ▼	112,639 ▲	85,429 ▼
Colombia	194,467 ▲	129,501 ▲	118,163 ▲	84,470 ▲	27,892 ▲	27,129 ▼	126,595 ▼	131,596 ▼	140,363 ▲	135,192 ▲	118,866 ▼	158,886 ▲	116,461 ▲	100,324 ▲	91,345 ▲
Mexico	121,884 ▲	99,137 ▲	82,324 ▲	52,171 ▲	12,731 ▼	18,068 ▼	82,921 ▲	79,891 ▼	81,778 ▼	94,609 ▲	90,361 ▼	109,637 ▲	76,738 ▲	61,658 ▼	64,451 ▼
Canada	103,163 ▲	96,540 ▲	86,591 ▲	54,252 ▲	8,077 ▼	26,950 ▼	77,043 ▲	71,160 ▲	48,951 ▼	70,103 ▲	68,293 ▼	78,531 ▲	67,610 ▼	68,462 ▼	70,358 ▲
China	103,122 ▲	76,524 ▲	42,542 ▲	8,787 ▲	2,360 ▼	6,297 ▼	68,578 ▲	56,333 ▼	61,250 ▲	57,860 ▲	53,064 ▼	57,502 ▼	60,140 ▼	65,945 ▲	55,978 ▲
Japan	68,719 ▲	61,129 ▲	42,341 ▲	17,635 ▲	1,904 ▼	20,476 ▼	78,914 ▲	63,708 ▲	60,342 ▼	79,754 ▲	70,102 ▼	84,636 ▼	87,225 ▲	73,102 ▲	63,247 ▲
Switzerland	63,604 ▲	58,092 ▲	50,359 ▲	38,371 ▲	13,568 ▼	17,063 ▼	63,826 ▼	70,040 ▲	69,484 ▲	69,074 ▼	70,319 ▼	80,277 ▲	68,390 ▼	69,571 ▲	65,951 ▼
Netherlands	64,773 ▲	54,273 ▲	45,917 ▲	35,488 ▲	9,080 ▼	16,532 ▼	59,752 ▼	62,651 ▲	59,272 ▼	72,268 ▲	66,870 ▼	81,655 ▲	69,187 ▼	73,133 ▲	72,162 ▼
Australia	56,308 ▲	52,888 ▲	46,935 ▲	25,825 ▲	1,650 ▼	17,932 ▼	56,158 ▲	42,235 ▲	33,862 ▼	49,809 ▲	44,896 ▼	67,389 ▲	45,079 ▲	43,161 ▲	35,642 ▼
Ireland	48,935 ▲	42,832 ▲	35,983 ▲	30,216 ▲	4,478 ▼	10,419 ▼	34,973 ▲	23,917 ▲	13,363 ▼	16,428 ▼	17,651 ▼	19,467 ▲	19,352 ▲	18,457 ▲	16,871 ▲
Ecuador	59,060 ▲	38,493 ▲	33,273 ▲	18,971 ▲	6,593 ▼	7,646 ▼	31,040 ▲	29,374 ▼	34,244 ▲	30,604 ▼	34,899 ▼	42,349 ▲	29,324 ▲	26,462 ▲	25,495 ▲
Others	783,018 ▲	530,336 ▲	429,914 ▲	287,233 ▲	73,685 ▼	161,348 ▼	565,150 ▲	542,466 ▼	543,307 ▼	673,458 ▼	727,946 ▼	851,528 ▲	674,682 ▲	651,235 ▲	636,977 ▲
Total	9,287,196 ▲	6,773,619 ▲	5,908,341 ▲	3,630,031 ▲	745,871 ▼	2,146,435 ▼	6,353,141 ▼	6,621,376 ▲	6,588,770 ▲	6,546,696 ▲	6,305,838 ▼	6,429,852 ▲	5,813,342 ▲	5,676,843 ▲	5,433,354 ▲

== 2025 record arrivals ==
The year 2025 marked a record-breaking number of international visitors, as announced by Embratur and the Ministry of Tourism. In 2025, Brazil registered 9,287,196 international arrivals from 205 countries. This represented a 37% increase compared to the previous record set in 2024, far surpassing the influx of tourists recorded during major mega-events hosted by the country, such as the 2014 FIFA World Cup and the 2016 Rio Olympics.

The most significant growth in arrivals came from Argentina, which saw a 72% year-over-year (YoY) increase. With over 3.3 million tourists, Argentines formed the largest demographic group to visit Brazil, followed by visitors from Chile, the United States, Paraguay, and Uruguay. Brazil also registered a substantial rise in tourists from Europe and Asia, with an overall increase of more than 20% from these regions. The United Kingdom, France, Portugal, Spain, Germany, Italy, and China represented the largest source markets outside the Americas.

The following table provides a breakdown of the top 88 source nationalities visiting Brazil, comparing arrival data between 2024 and 2025, alongside the year-over-year percentage growth:

Country	Arrivals 2025	Arrivals 2024	YoY (%)
Total	9.287.196	6.773.619	37.11%
Argentina	3.386.823	1.960.182	72.78%
Chile	801.921	653.895	22.64%
United States	759.637	728.537	4.27%
Paraguay	528.554	465.020	13.66%
Uruguay	524.729	388.464	35.08%
France	293.008	235.163	24.60%
Portugal	273.483	218.354	25.25%
Germany	209.854	182.166	15.20%
Colombia	194.467	129.501	50.17%
Italy	190.342	154.495	23.20%
United Kingdom	187.396	153.754	21.88%
Peru	175.418	131.368	33.53%
Venezuela	169.346	8.637	1860.70%
Spain	160.484	132.484	21.13%
Bolivia	128.494	129.992	-1.15%
Mexico	121.884	99.137	22.95%
Canada	103.163	96.540	6.86%
China	103.122	76.524	34.76%
Japan	68.719	61.129	12.42%
Netherlands	64.773	54.273	19.35%
Switzerland	63.604	58.092	9.49%
Ecuador	59.060	38.493	53.43%
Australia	56.308	52.888	6.47%
Ireland	48.935	42.832	14.25%
Russia	35.289	31.009	13.80%
Israel	31.074	16.485	88.50%
South Korea	29.955	28.435	5.35%
Belgium	29.891	26.530	12.67%
Poland	29.777	25.967	14.67%
Costa Rica	29.068	16.812	72.90%
Sweden	22.802	20.776	9.75%
Austria	21.089	18.469	14.19%
Turkey	18.783	25.117	-25.22%
South Africa	18.282	15.280	19.65%
India	17.515	15.274	14.67%
Denmark	17.293	15.117	14.39%
Panama	16.492	11.125	48.24%
Dominican Republic	16.337	12.833	27.30%
Norway	15.453	13.869	11.42%
New Zealand	12.978	11.030	17.66%
Guatemala	11.985	8.909	34.53%
Romania	11.747	10.558	11.26%
Suriname	11.474	11.873	-3.36%
Greece	11.037	9.176	20.28%
Angola	9.134	13.520	-32.44%
Hungary	8.713	6.964	25.11%
Czech Republic	8.589	7.152	20.09%
Guyana	7.721	6.399	20.66%
Philippines	6.895	5.714	20.67%
Morocco	6.742	4.854	38.90%
Finland	6.231	5.166	20.62%
Indonesia	6.227	6.035	3.18%
Ukraine	5.982	4.795	24.75%
Singapore	5.899	5.014	17.65%
El Salvador	5.326	4.357	22.24%
Bulgaria	5.035	4.142	21.56%
Taiwan	5.003	4.087	22.41%
Mozambique	4.955	4.156	19.23%
Honduras	4.931	3.535	39.49%
China, Hong Kong	4.874	4.052	20.29%
Thailand	4.848	4.112	17.90%
Croatia	4.713	3.444	36.85%
Slovakia	4.691	3.253	44.21%
Malaysia	4.257	3.873	9.91%
Cuba	4.110	3.848	6.81%
Serbia	3.663	2.961	23.71%
Lithuania	3.104	2.615	18.70%
Luxembourg	3.011	2.340	28.68%
Lebanon	2.966	2.569	15.45%
Nicaragua	2.797	1.739	60.84%
Iran	2.610	4.438	-41.19%
Tunisia	2.542	1.710	48.65%
Egypt	2.472	1.656	49.28%
Nigeria	2.440	1.627	49.97%
Slovenia	2.396	1.960	22.24%
Estonia	1.962	1.513	29.68%
Haiti	1.833	836	119.26%
Saudi Arabia	1.753	2.384	-26.47%
Ghana	1.712	867	97.46%
Latvia	1.587	1.499	5.87%
Kenya	1.560	909	71.62%
Trinidad and Tobago	1.344	820	63.90%
Pakistan	1.220	952	28.15%
Bangladesh	822	1.171	-29.80%
Cape Verde	723	568	27.29%
Syria	619	588	5.27%

=== Comparison with other destinations ===
The following is a comparative summary of Brazil's tourism industry key performance indicators as compared with countries considered among the most popular destinations in Latin America, and relevant economic indicators are included to show the relative importance that international tourism has on the economy of the selected countries.

Selected Caribbean and Latin American countries	International tourist arrivals 2019 (x1000)	International tourism receipts 2019 (million USD)	Receipts per arrival 2019 (col 2)/(col 1) (USD)	Arrivals per capita per 1000 pop. (estimated) 2007	Receipts per capita 2005 USD	Revenues as % of exports goods and services 2003	Tourism revenues as % GDP 2012	% Direct & indirect employment in tourism 2012	World Ranking Tourism Compet. TTCI 2024	Index value TTCI 2024
Argentina	7,399	5,241	708	115	57	7.4	10.5	9.9	49	4.10
Brazil	6,353	5,995	944	26	18	3.2	8.9	8.1	26	4.41
Chile	4,518	2,302	510	151	73	5.3	8.4	8.0	31	4.33
Colombia	4,169	5,682	1,363	26	25	6.6	5.1	5.5	40	4.08
Costa Rica	3,139	3,988	1,270	442	343	17.5	12.5	11.7	51	4.08
Cuba	4,263	2,596	609	188	169	n/d	n/d	n/d	n/d	n/d
Dominican Republic	6,446	7,472	1,159	408	353	36.2	14.7	13.6	64	3.88
Jamaica	2,681	3,639	1,357	628	530	49.2	25.7	23.8	84	3.59
Mexico	45,024	24,573	546	201	103	5.7	12.4	13.7	38	4.26
Panama	1,753	4,520	2,578	330	211	10.6	10.1	9.6	63	3.90
Peru	4,372	3,738	855	65	41	9.0	9.1	7.8	62	3.90
Uruguay	3,056	2,255	738	525	145	14.2	10.2	9.7	71	3.79

- Notes: Green shadow denotes the country with the top indicator. Yellow shadow corresponds to Brazilian indicators.

=== Tourist visa ===
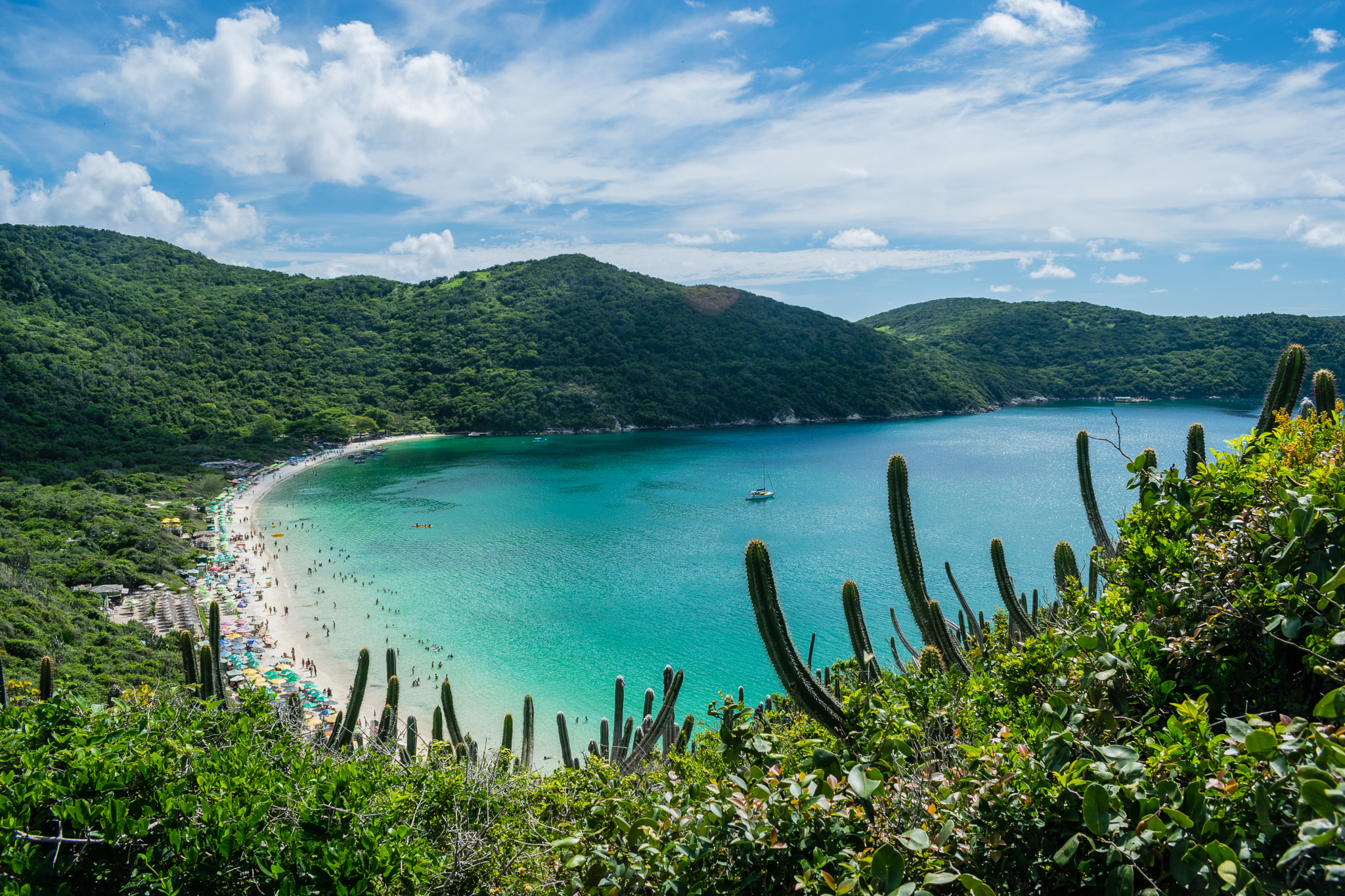
Arraial do Cabo, Rio de Janeiro

Tourist visa requirements have been waived for citizens of Andorra, Argentina, Australia, Austria, Bahamas, Barbados, Belarus, Belgium, Bolivia, Bulgaria, Canada, Chile, Colombia, Costa Rica, Croatia, Czech Republic, Denmark, Ecuador, Finland, France, Germany, Greece, Guatemala, Guyana, Hong Kong, Hungary, Iceland, India, Ireland, Israel, Italy, Japan, Liechtenstein, Lithuania, Luxembourg, Macau, Malaysia, Malta, Mexico, Monaco, Namibia, Netherlands, New Zealand, Norway, Panama, Paraguay, Peru, Philippines, Poland, Portugal, Qatar, Romania, Russia, San Marino, Singapore, Slovakia, Slovenia, South Africa, South Korea, Spain, Suriname, Sweden, Switzerland, Thailand, Trinidad and Tobago, Turkey, Ukraine, the United Kingdom, Uruguay, Vatican City, and Venezuela.

Tourist visas also applies to lecturers at conferences, for visiting relatives and/or friends, unpaid participation in athletic or artistic event or competition (in this case an invitation letter from the sponsoring organization in Brazil is required), and unpaid participation in a scientific/academic seminar or conference sponsored by a research or academic institution (in this case, an invitation letter from the sponsoring organization in Brazil is required).

== Amusement parks ==
In 2023, according to the "Best Amusement and Water Parks" ranking, from the "Travelers' Choice" award, from the TripAdvisor website, Brazil had 4 of the 25 best entertainment parks in the world: Beto Carrero World (2nd), in Santa Catarina; Beach Park (3rd), in Ceará; Terra Mágica Florybal Park (13th), in Rio Grande do Sul; and Hot Park (18th), in Goiás.

== Paleontological tourism ==
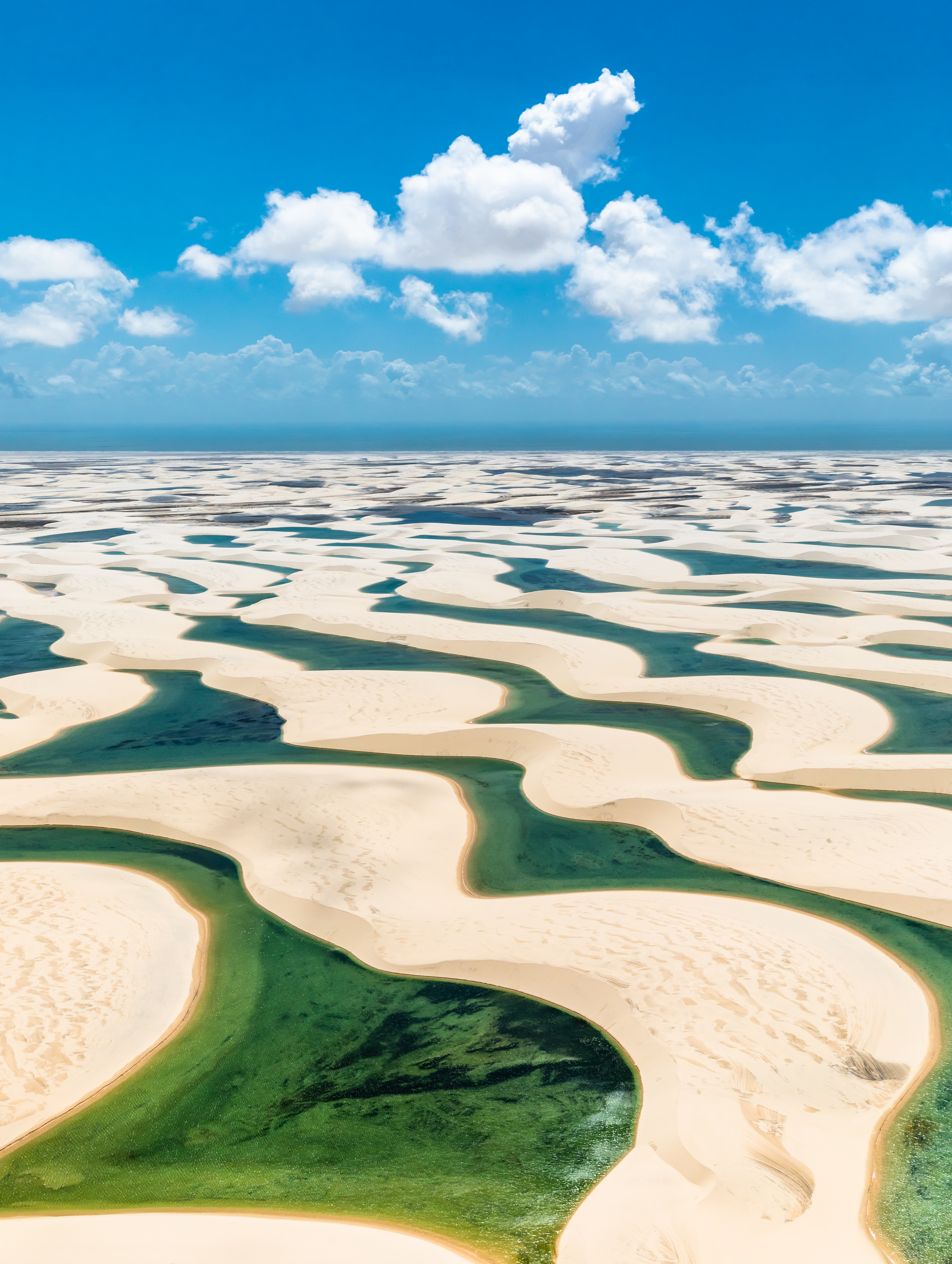
Lençóis Maranhenses National Park, in Maranhão

Geopark Paleorrota is the main area of geotourism in Rio Grande do Sul and one of the most important in Brazil. With 83,000 km^{2} (32,000 sq mi) inside 281,000 km^{2} (108,000 sq mi) of the state, where many fossils of the Permian and Triassic period, with ages ranging between 210 and 290 million years ago, when there were only the continent Pangaea.

In the region Metropolitan Porto Alegre there are 5 museums to visit. In Paleorrota Geopark there are 7 museums, the Palaeobotanical Garden in Mata and the Paleontological Sites of Santa Maria to be visited. The BR-287, nicknamed Highway of Dinosaurs, crosses 17 of 41 municipalities of the geopark.

== Ecotourism ==
Bonito, in Mato Grosso do Sul, is considered the Brazilian capital of ecotourism. This type of tourism also occurs in places like Pantanal and Amazon rainforest, Brotas, Cambará do Sul, Canela, Caravelas, Chapada Diamantina, Chapada dos Veadeiros, Ilha Grande, Ilha do Mel, Iporanga, Itacaré, Itatiaia, Itaúnas State Park, Jalapão, Jericoacoara, Monte Verde, Morro de São Paulo, Pirenópolis, Socorro, Ubatuba, Lavrinhas and many others.

== Domestic tourism ==
Domestic tourism is a key market segment for the tourism industry in Brazil. In 2005, 51 million Brazilian nationals made ten times more trips than foreign tourists and spent five times more money than their international counterparts. The main destination states in 2005 were São Paulo (27.7%), Minas Gerais (10.8%), Rio de Janeiro (8.4%), Bahia (7.4%), and Santa Catarina (7.2%). The top three states by trip origin were São Paulo (35.7%), Minas Gerais (13.6%).

In terms of tourism revenues, the top earners by state were São Paulo (16.4%) and Bahia (11.7%). For 2005, the three main trip purposes were visiting friends and family (53.1%), sun and beach (40.8%), and cultural tourism (12.5%).

== Tourism by regions of Brazil ==
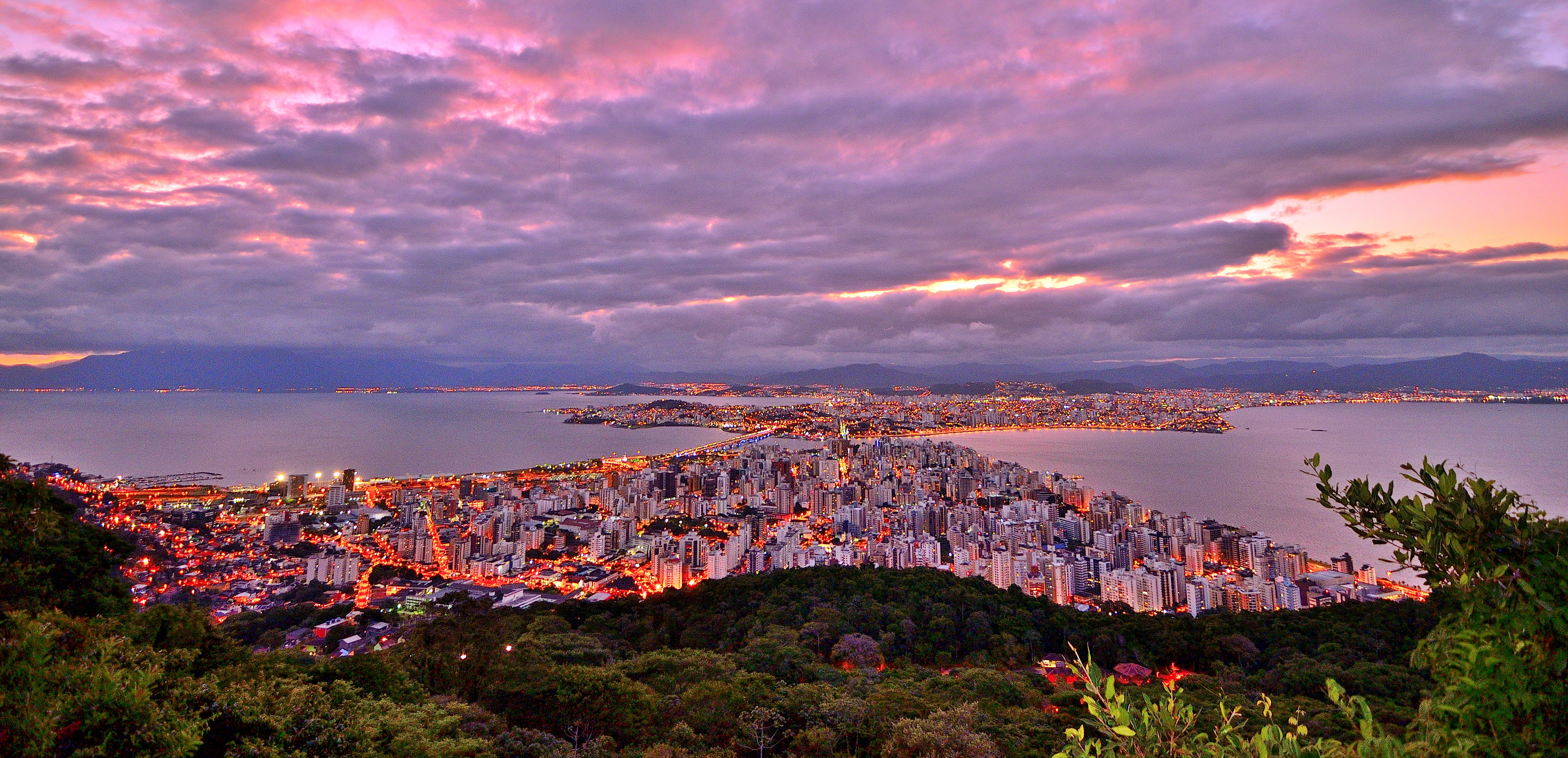
Florianópolis

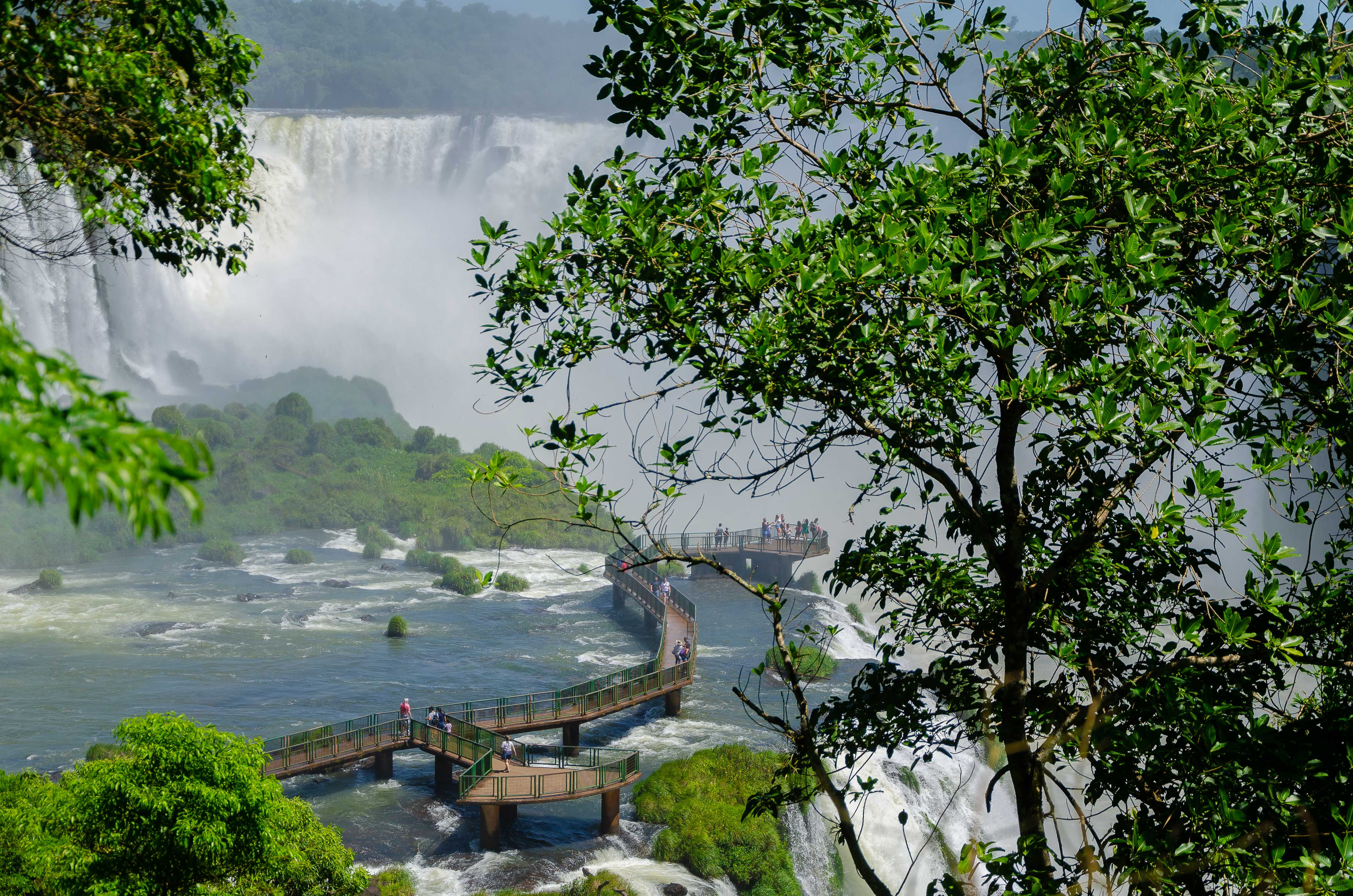
Iguazu Falls, Paraná, in Brazil-Argentina border, is the third most popular destination for foreign tourists who come to Brazil for pleasure.

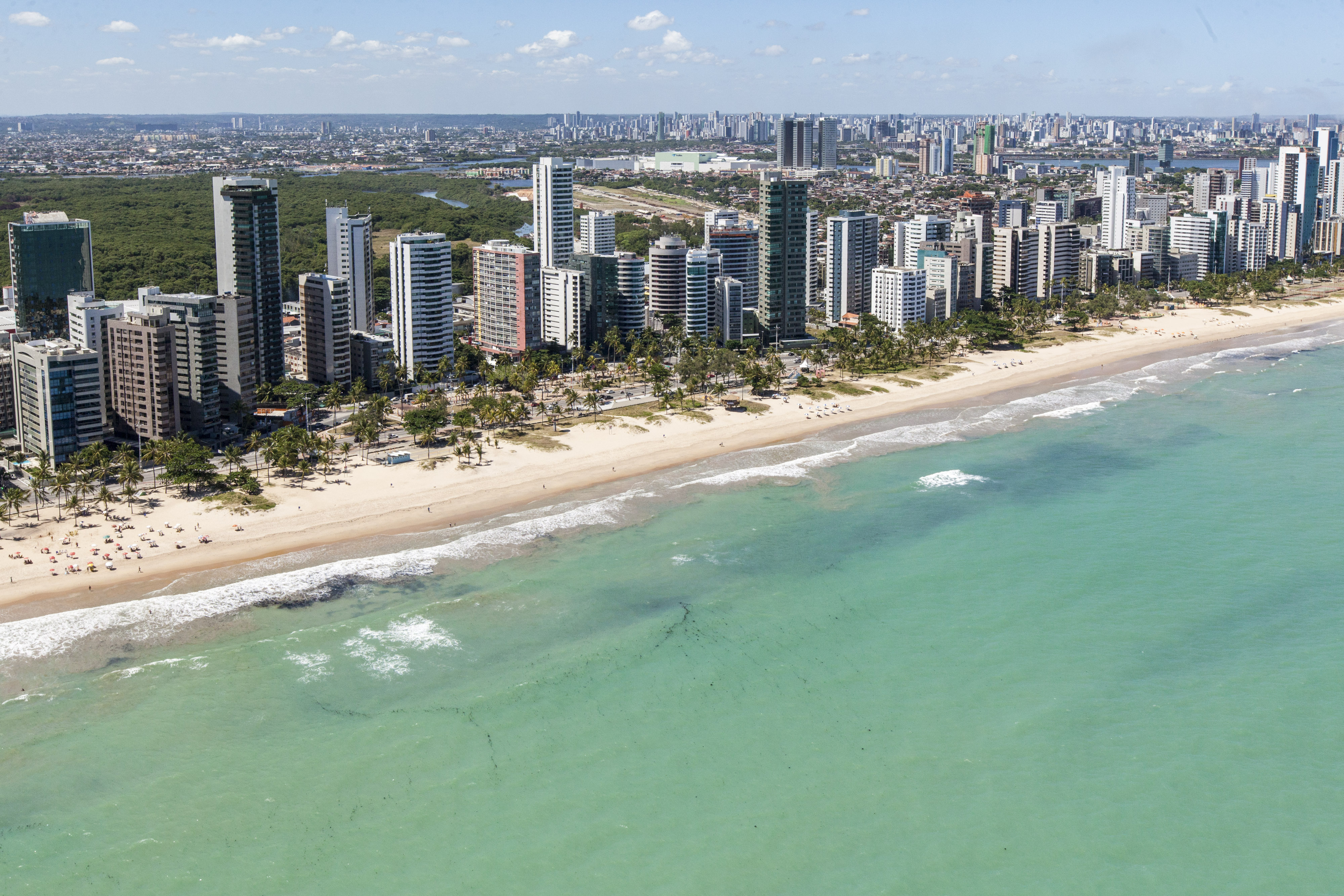
Boa Viagem beach in Recife

- Southeast Region:
  - Rio de Janeiro: Rio de Janeiro, Angra dos Reis, Paraty, Resende, Visconde de Mauá, Itatiaia National Park, Petrópolis, Vassouras, Teresópolis, Serra dos Órgãos, Nova Friburgo, Saquarema, Arraial do Cabo, Cabo Frio, Búzios, Ilha Grande;
  - Espírito Santo: Vitória, Vila Velha, Guarapari, Anchieta, Piúma, Marataízes, São Mateus, Conceição da Barra, Domingos Martins, Santa Teresa;
  - Minas Gerais: Belo Horizonte, Sabará, Ouro Preto, Congonhas, Mariana, Lavras, São João del-Rei, Tiradentes, Diamantina, Serro, Araxá, Caxambu, São Lourenço, São Thomé das Letras, Capitólio, Camanducaia, Caparaó National Park, Pico da Bandeira, Serra do Cipó National Park, Serra da Canastra National Park;
  - São Paulo: São Paulo, São Sebastião, Ilhabela, Boiçucanga, Poá, Guararema, Guarujá, Santos, Iguape, Cananéia, São Vicente, Campos do Jordão, Holambra, Campinas, Ribeirão Preto, São José dos Campos, Sorocaba, Americana, Araçatuba, Araraquara, Araras, Atibaia, Barretos, Birigüi, Botucatu, Bragança Paulista, Itu, Jaú.
- Southern Region:
  - Paraná: Curitiba, Morretes, Antonina, Paranaguá, Ilha do Mel, Superagui National Park, Foz do Iguaçu, Iguaçu Falls, Guaratuba;
  - Santa Catarina: Florianópolis, Santa Catarina Island, Joinville, Blumenau, Itapema, Itajaí, Balneário Camboriú;
  - Rio Grande do Sul: Porto Alegre, Torres, Aparados da Serra National Park, Serra Gaúcha, Canela, Gramado, Paleorrota;
- Center-West Region:
  - Federal District: Brasília;
  - Goiás: Goiânia, Chapada dos Veadeiros National Park, Pirenópolis, Goiás Velho, Caldas Novas, Emas National Park, Araguaia River;
  - Mato Grosso: Cuiabá, The Pantanal, Chapada dos Guimarães National Park, Tangará da Serra, Barra do Garças, Alta Floresta, Cáceres, Barão de Melgaço, Poconé;
  - Mato Grosso do Sul: Campo Grande, Corumbá, Bonito, Ponta Porã, Aquidauana, Coxim, Jardim.
- Northeast Region:
  - Bahia: Salvador, Cachoeira, Lençóis, Morro de São Paulo, Ilhéus, Itacaré, Porto Seguro, Arraial d'Ajuda, Trancoso, Chapada Diamantina National Park, Abrolhos Marine National Park;
  - Pernambuco: Recife, Olinda, Itamaracá, Igarassu, Caruaru, Porto de Galinhas, New Jerusalem, Garanhuns, Triunfo, Fernando de Noronha, Catimbau Valley, Petrolina;
  - Ceará: Fortaleza, Aracati, Canoa Quebrada, Jericoacoara, Tatajuba, Camocim, Sobral, Baturité, Ubajara National Park, Juazeiro do Norte;
  - Sergipe: Aracaju, Laranjeiras, São Cristóvão, Estância, Propriá;
  - Alagoas: Maceió, Maragogi, Penedo, Barra de São Miguel, Paripueira, Porto de Pedras;
  - Paraíba: João Pessoa, Campina Grande, Cabedelo, Ingá, Baía da Traição, Sousa;
  - Rio Grande do Norte: Natal, Mossoró, Tibau do Sul, Tibau, Parnamirim, Touros, São Miguel do Gostoso, Galinhos, Caicó, Macau, Martins, Maxaranguape, Cape São Roque;
  - Piauí: Teresina, Sete Cidades National Park, Parnaíba, Serra da Capivara National Park;
  - Maranhão: São Luís, Lençóis Maranhenses National Park, Alcântara, Imperatriz, Carolina.
- North Region:
  - Amazonas: Manaus, Parintins, Tefé, Mamirauá;
  - Pará: Belém, Marajó Island, Santarém;
  - Tocantins: Palmas, Ilha do Bananal, Natividade;
  - Amapá: Macapá, Oiapoque;
  - Roraima: Boa Vista, Monte Roraima;
  - Rondônia: Porto Velho, Guajará-Mirim, Guaporé Valley;
  - Acre: Rio Branco, Xapuri, Brasiléia, Assis Brasil.

== Gallery ==
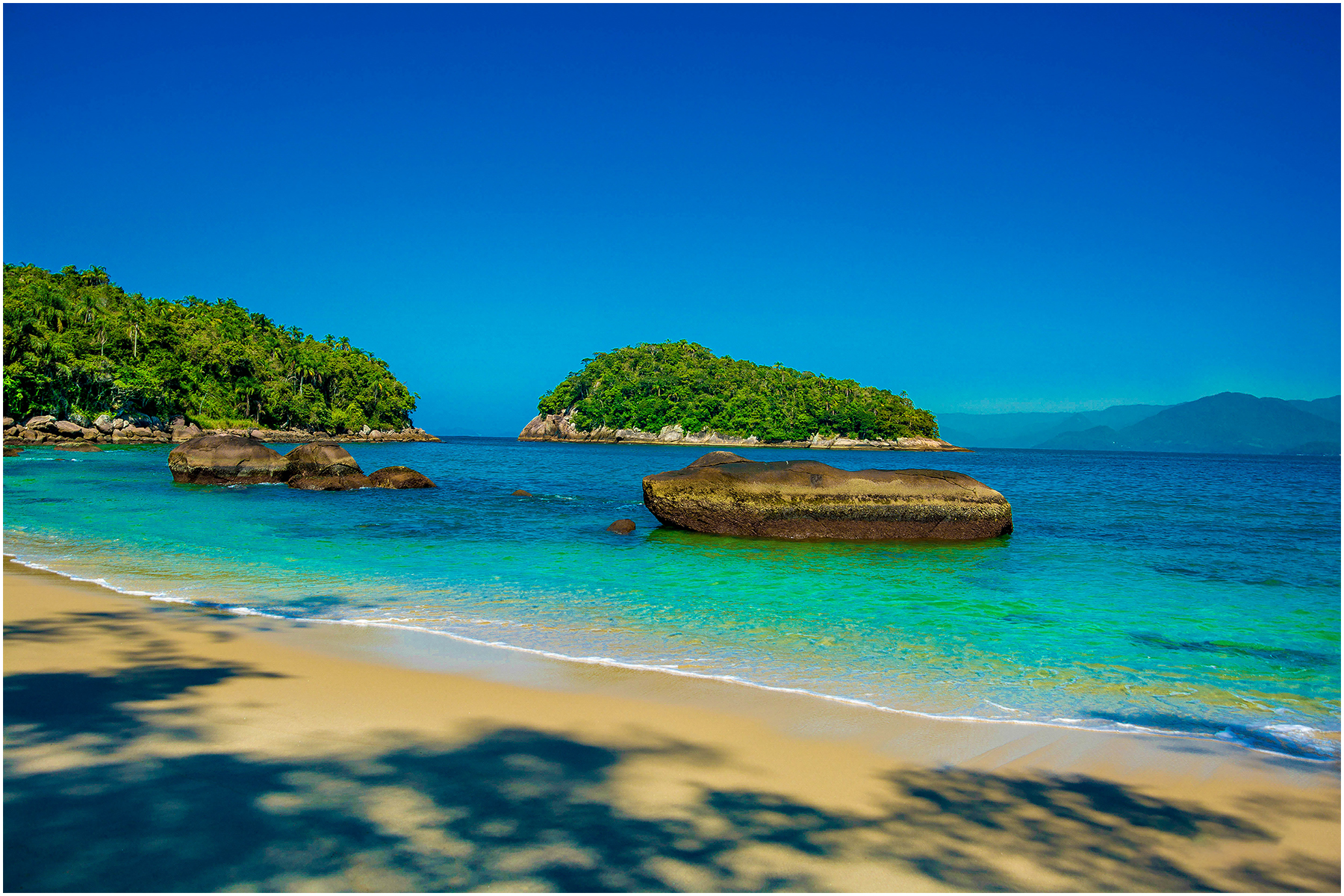
Ilha das Couves in Ubatuba, São Paulo

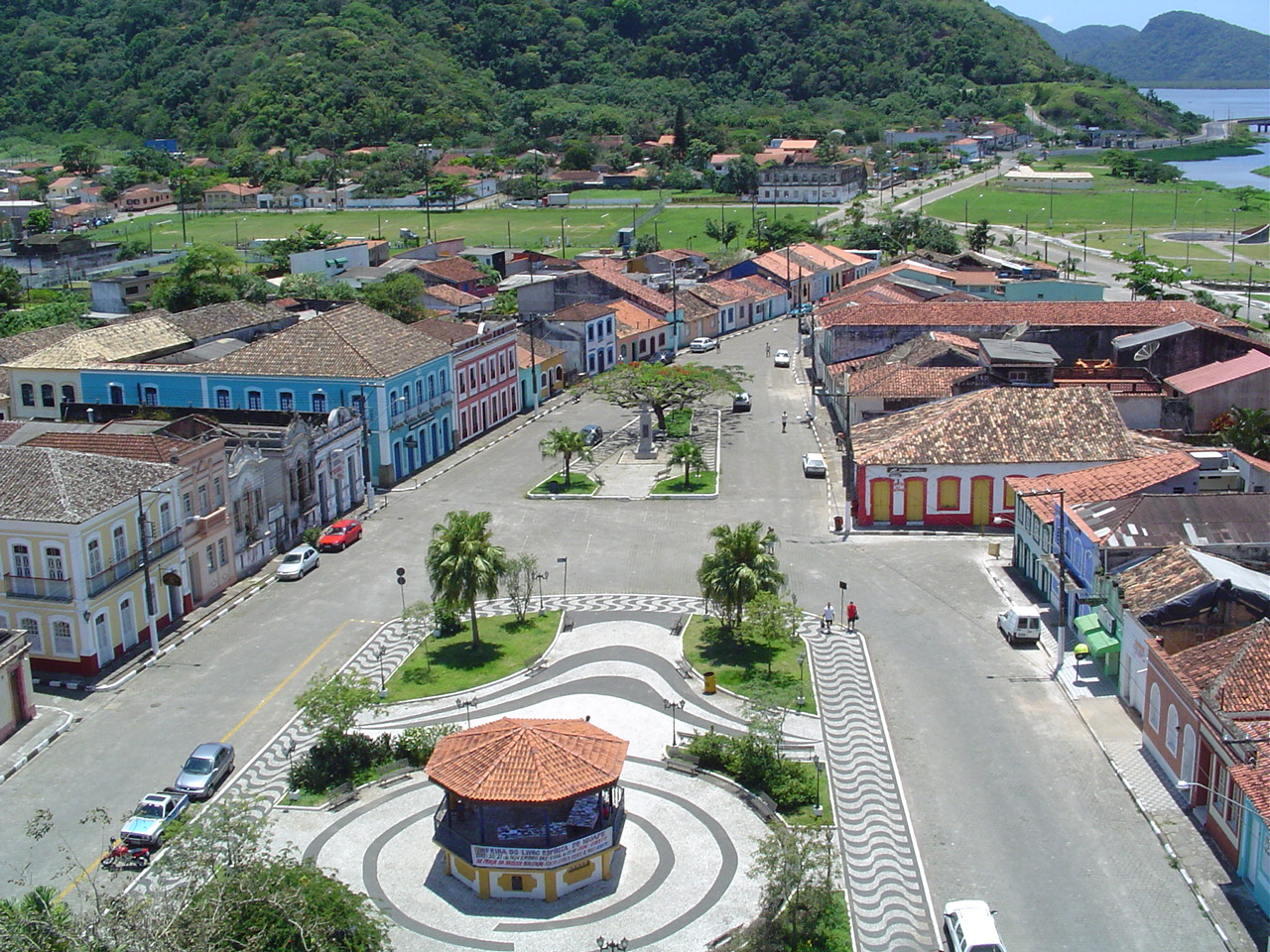
Historic town of Iguape, São Paulo

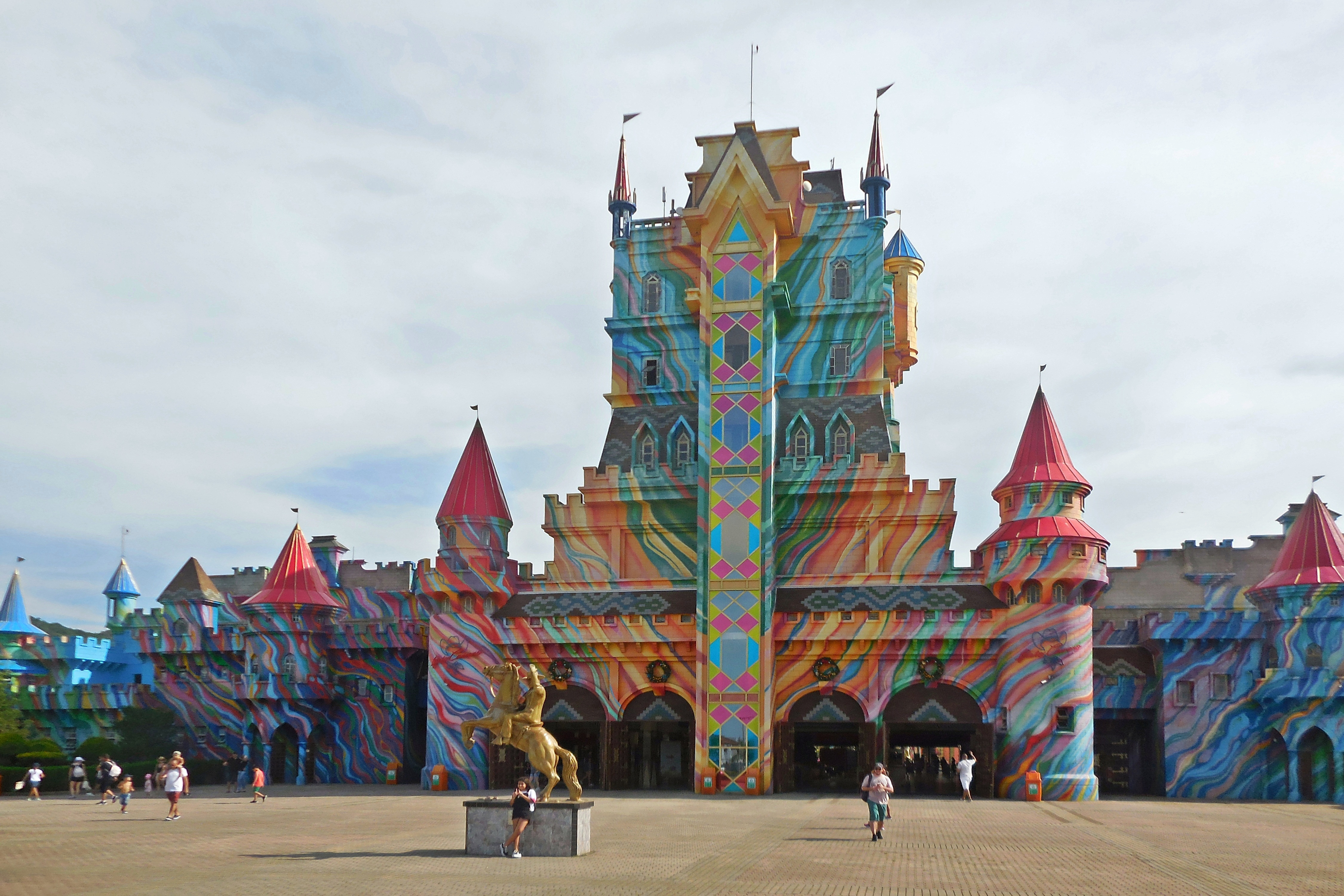
Beto Carrero World, in Santa Catarina

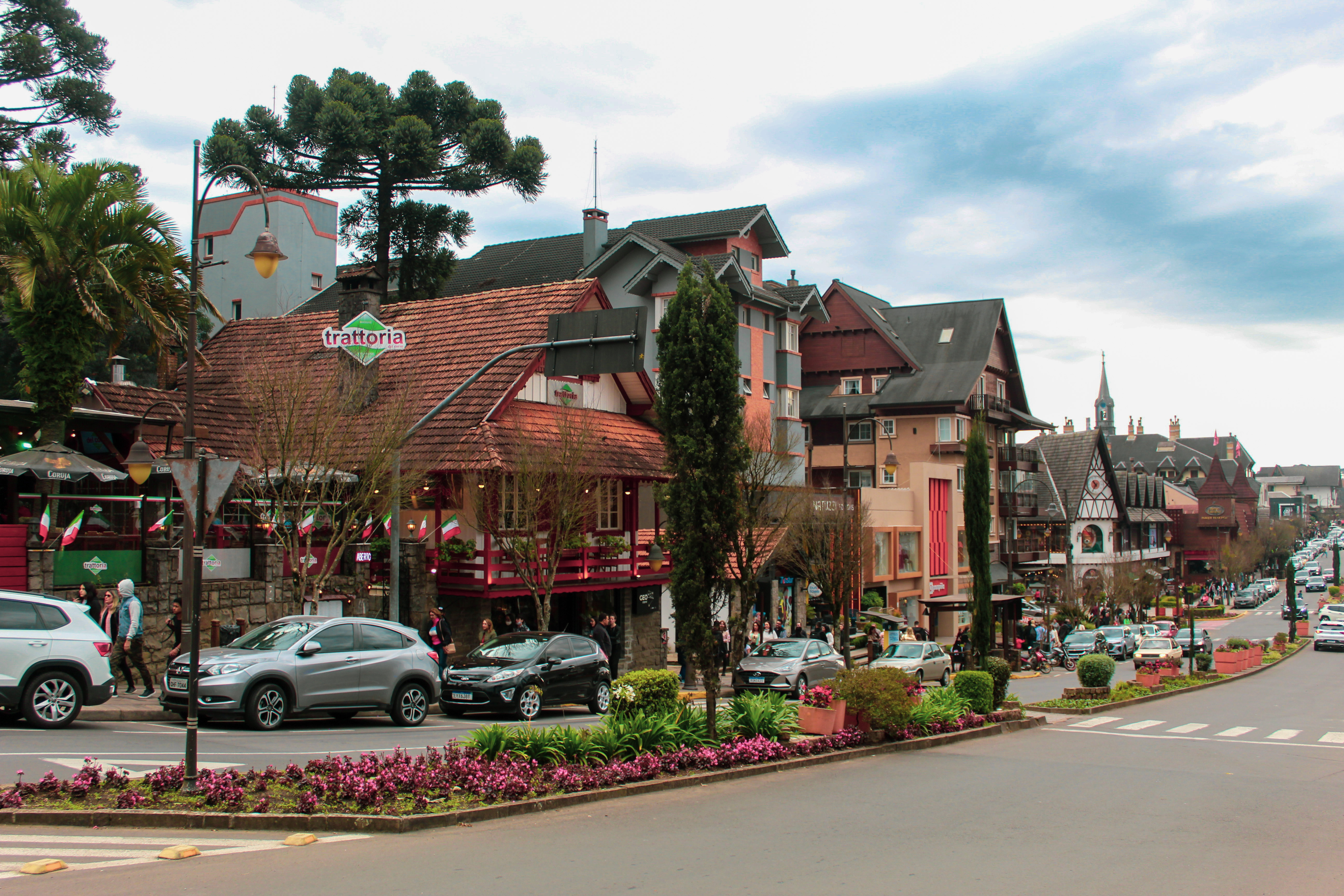
Gramado, in Rio Grande do Sul, is one of the most sought after for domestic tourism in Brazil.

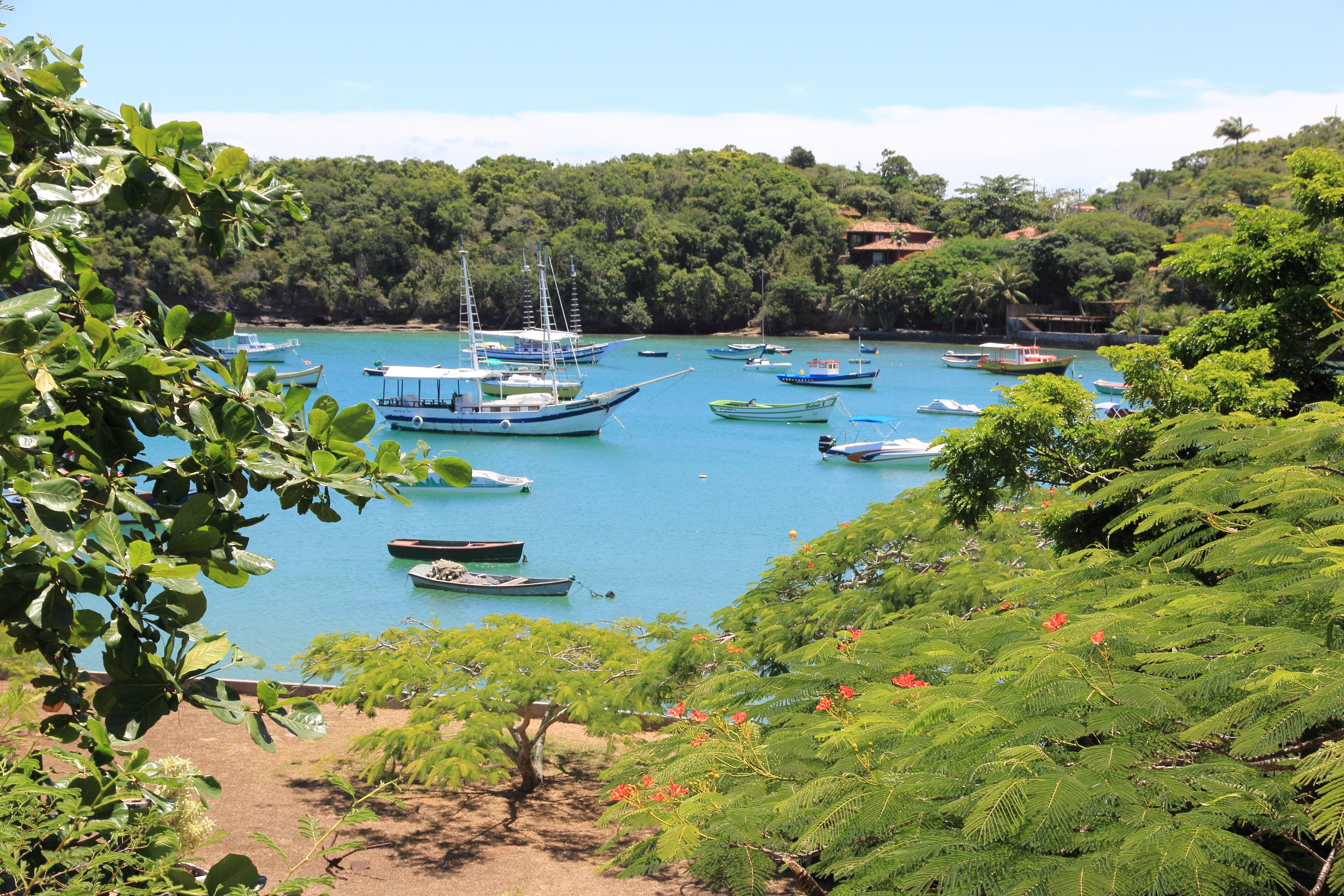
Armação dos Búzios in Rio de Janeiro State

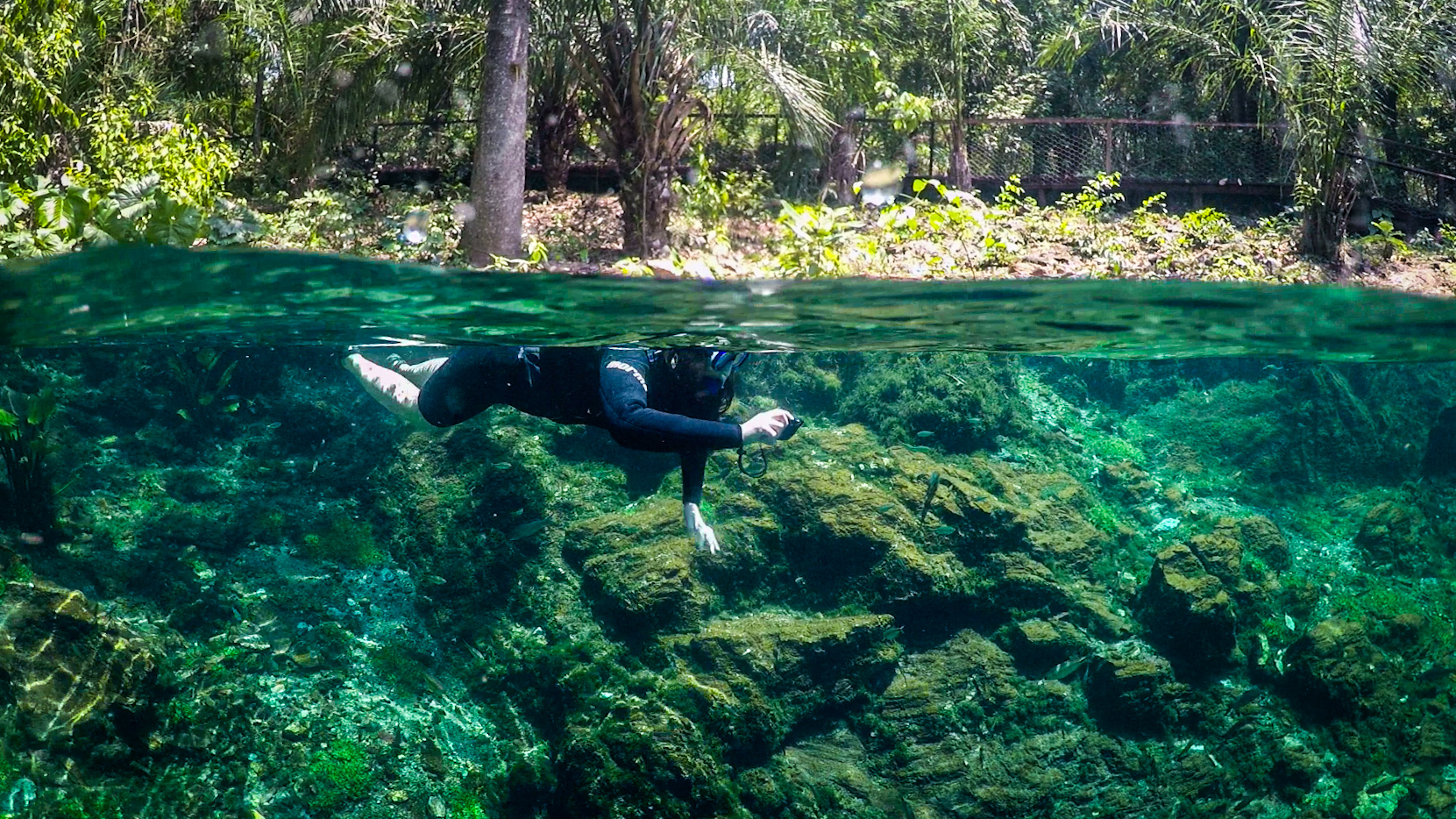
Bonito in Mato Grosso do Sul

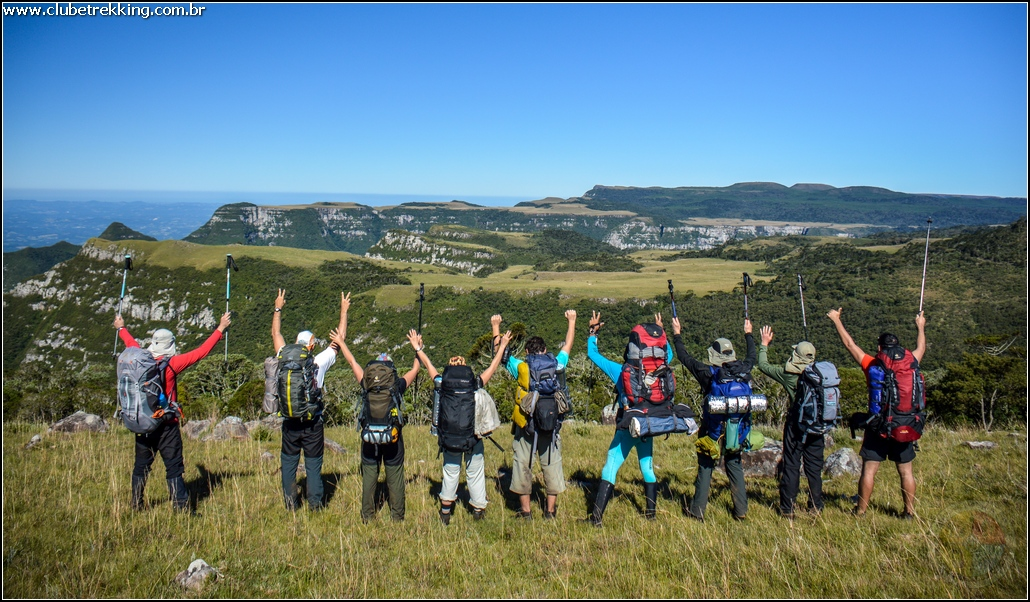
Hiking in Serra do Rio do Rastro, Santa Catarina

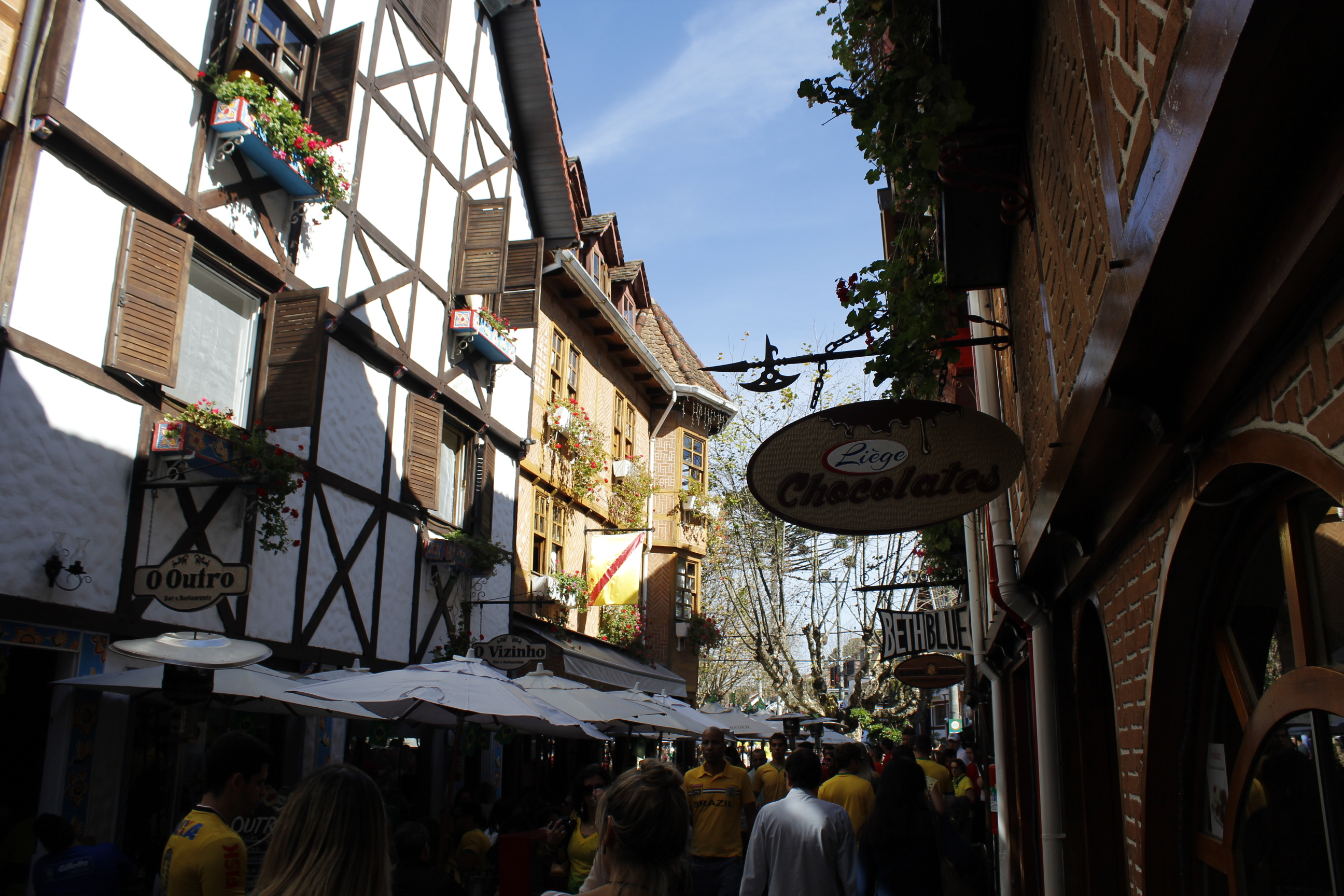
Swiss village in Campos do Jordão, São Paulo State

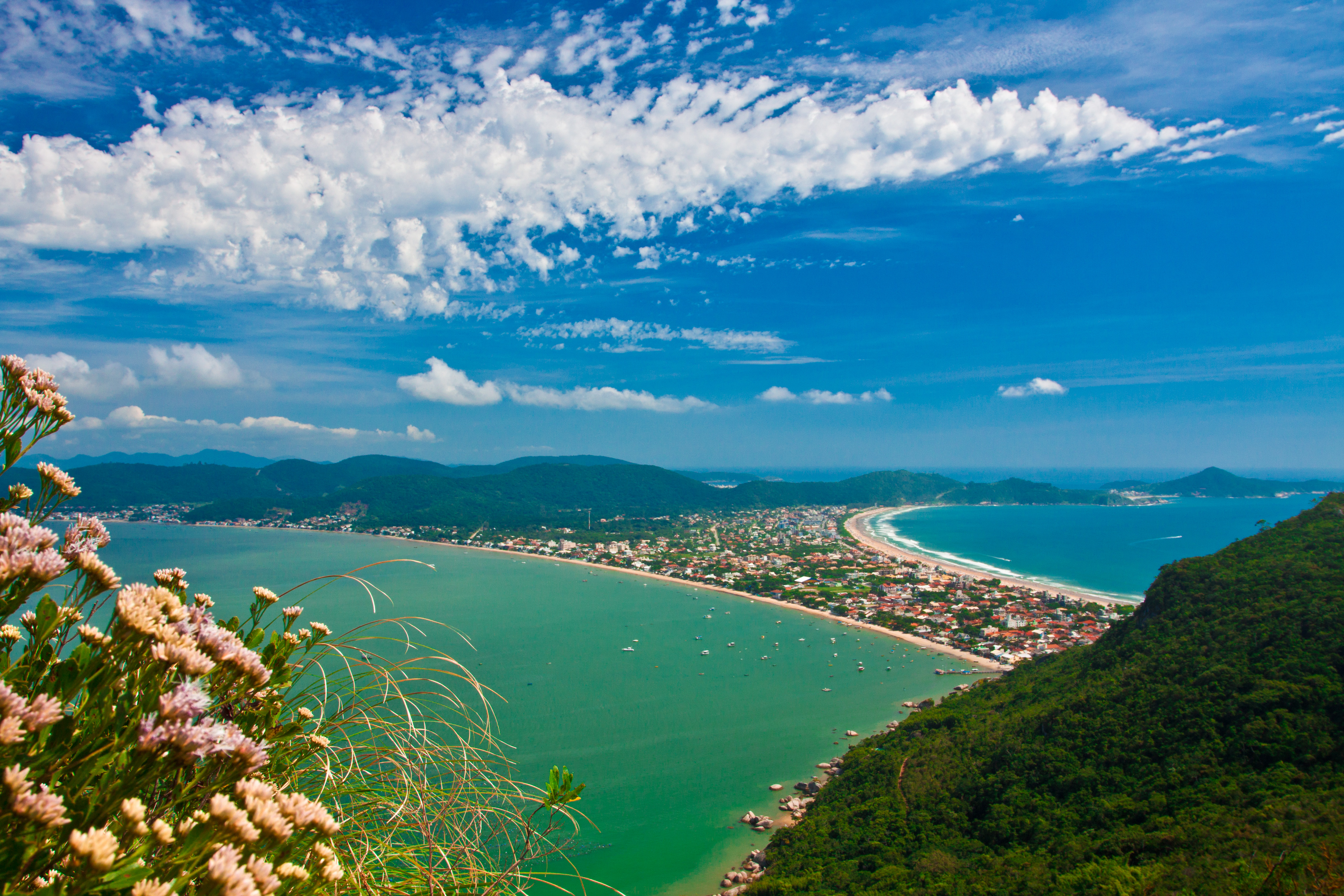
Bombinhas, Santa Catarina

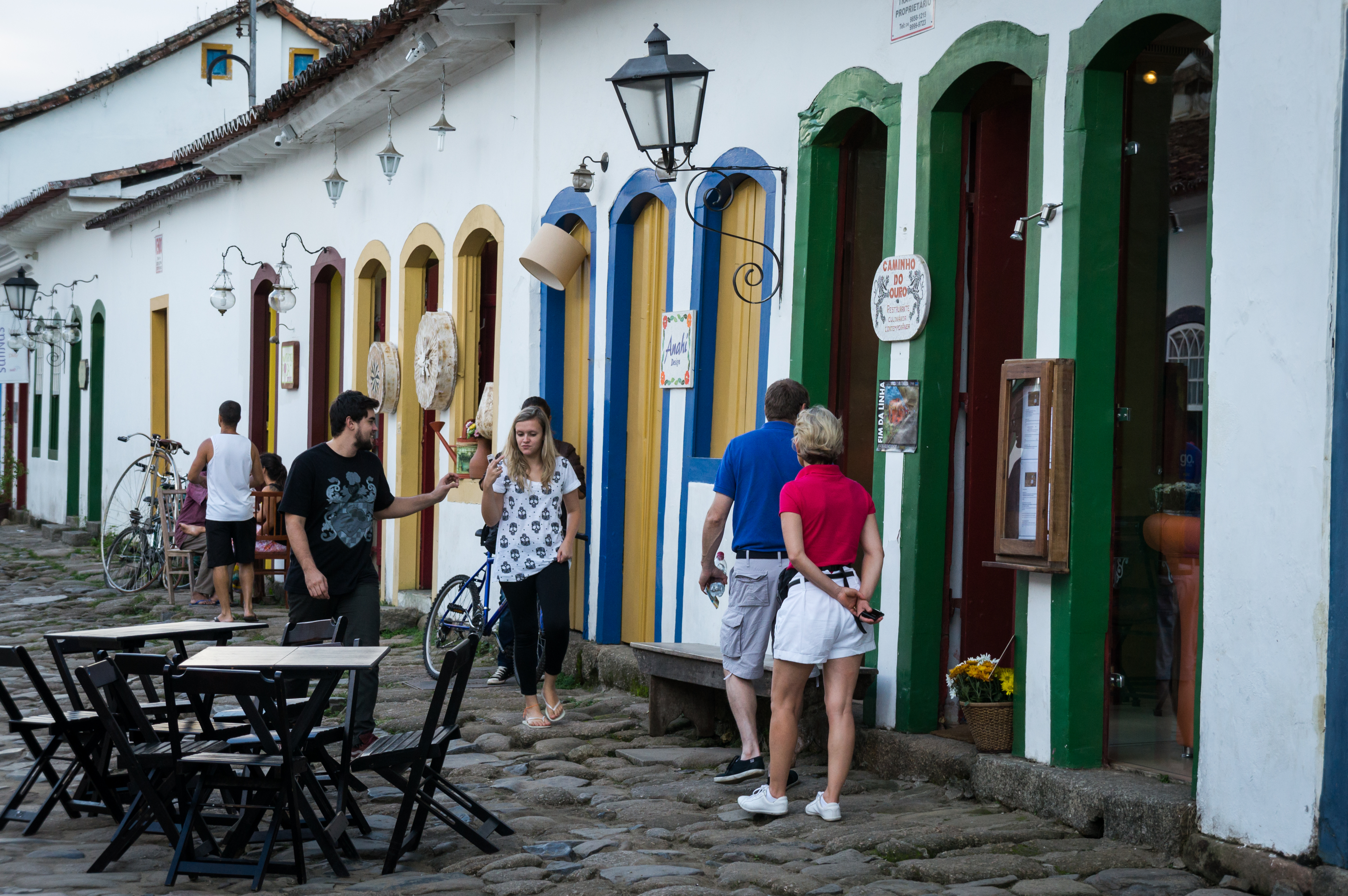
Paraty in Rio de Janeiro State

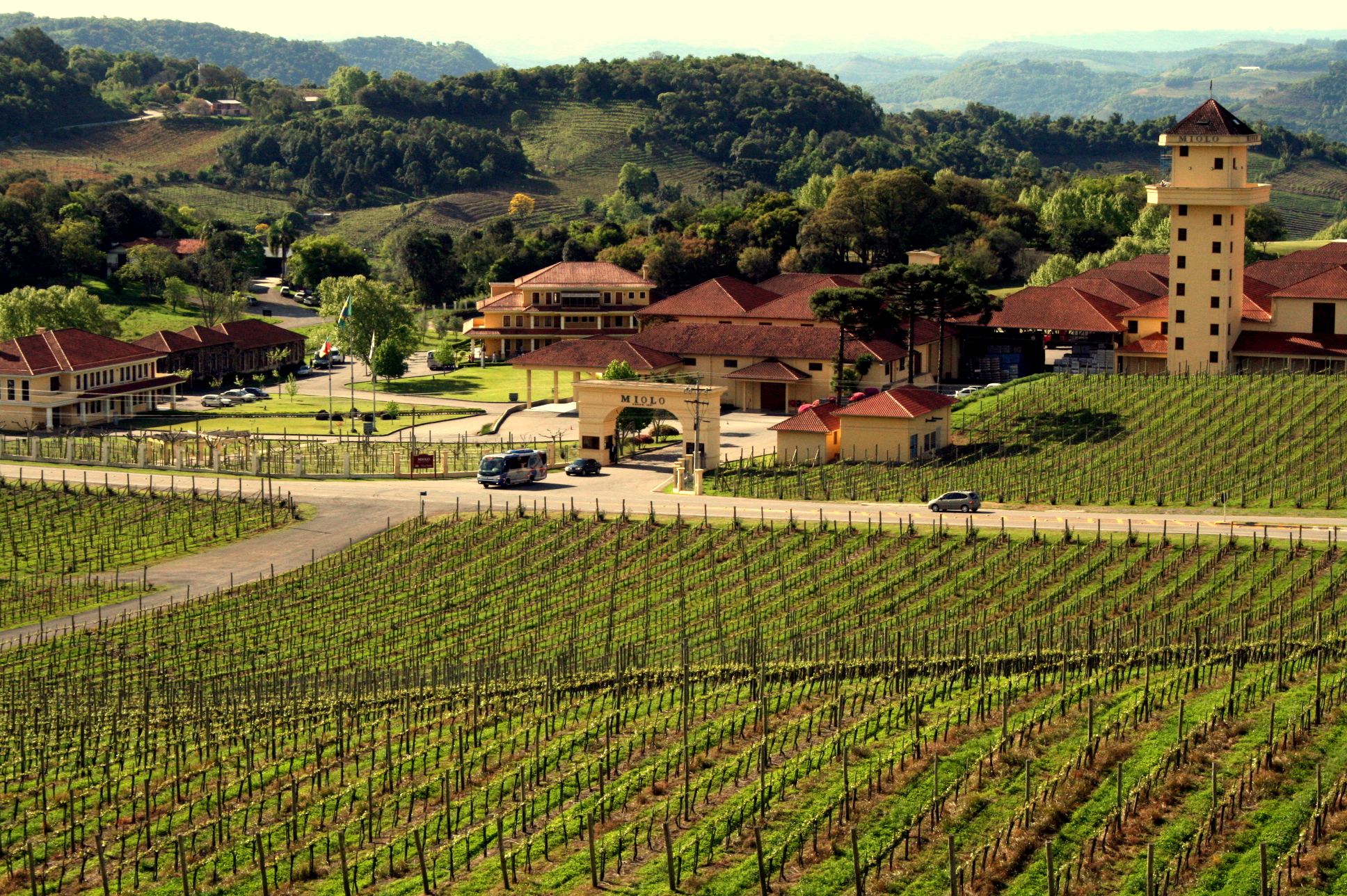
Vineyards valley in Rio Grande do Sul

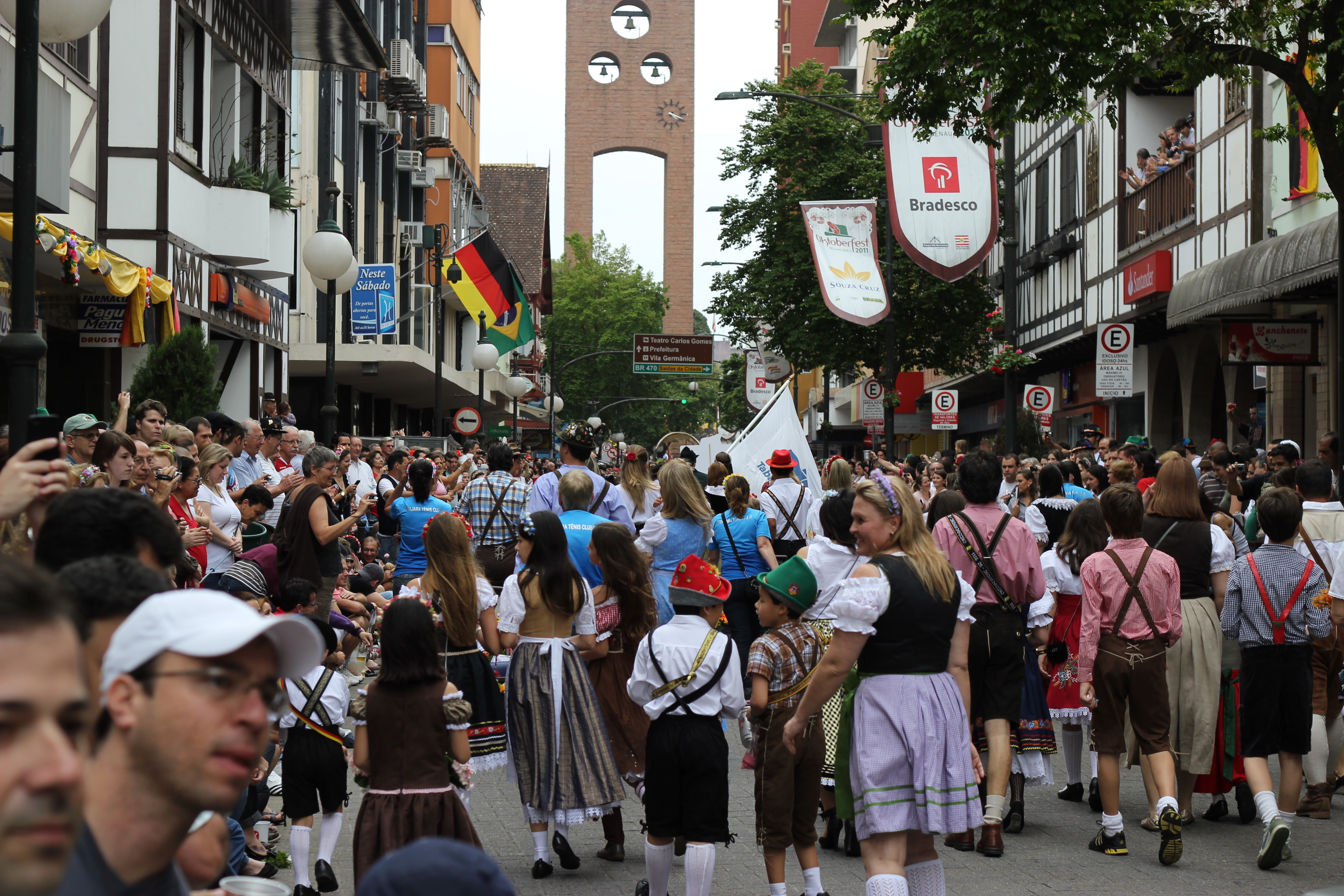
Oktoberfest of Blumenau

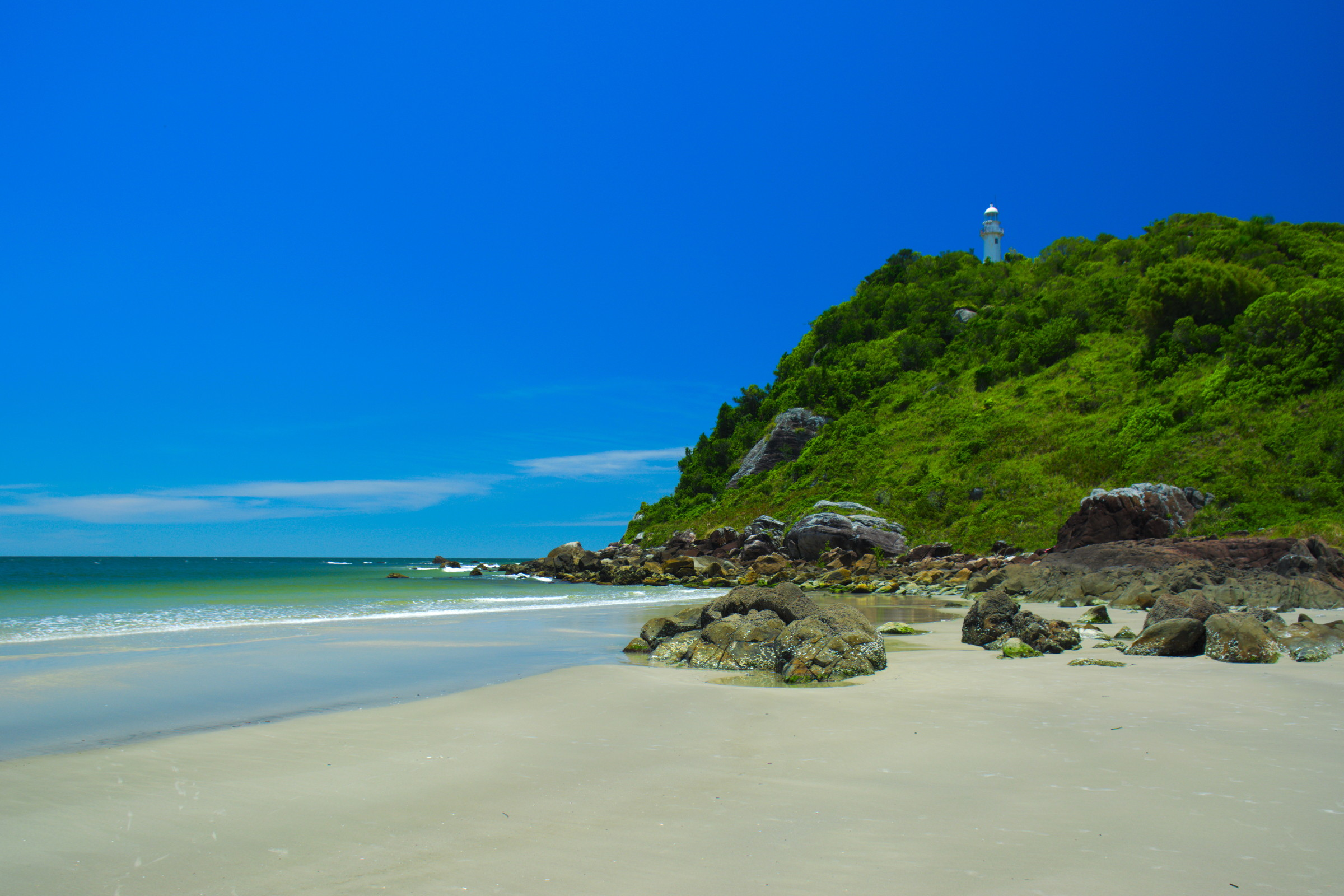
Mel Island in Paraná

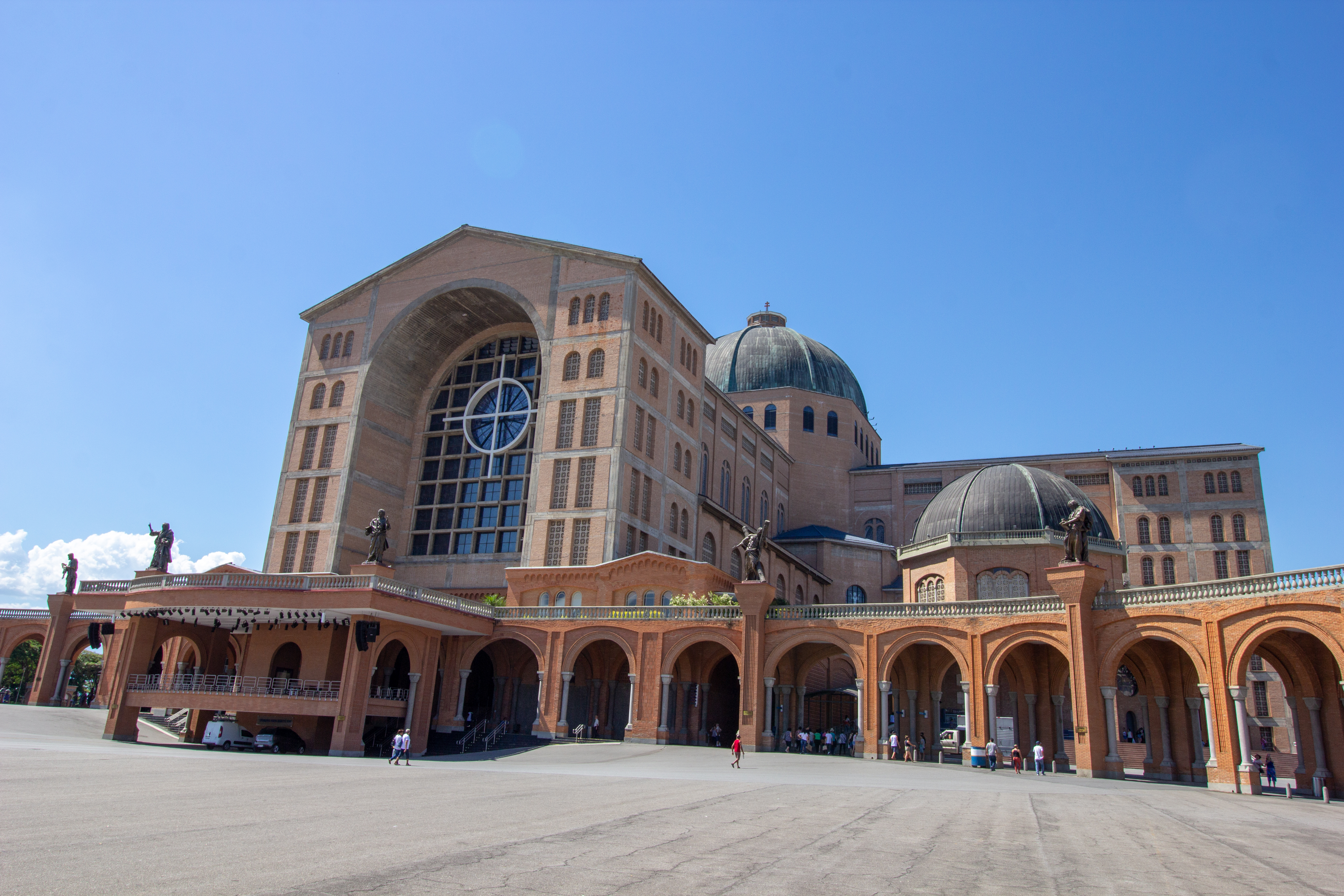
The Basilica of Our Lady of Aparecida is the second largest Catholic church in the world in interior area after the St. Peter's Basilica in the Vatican City.

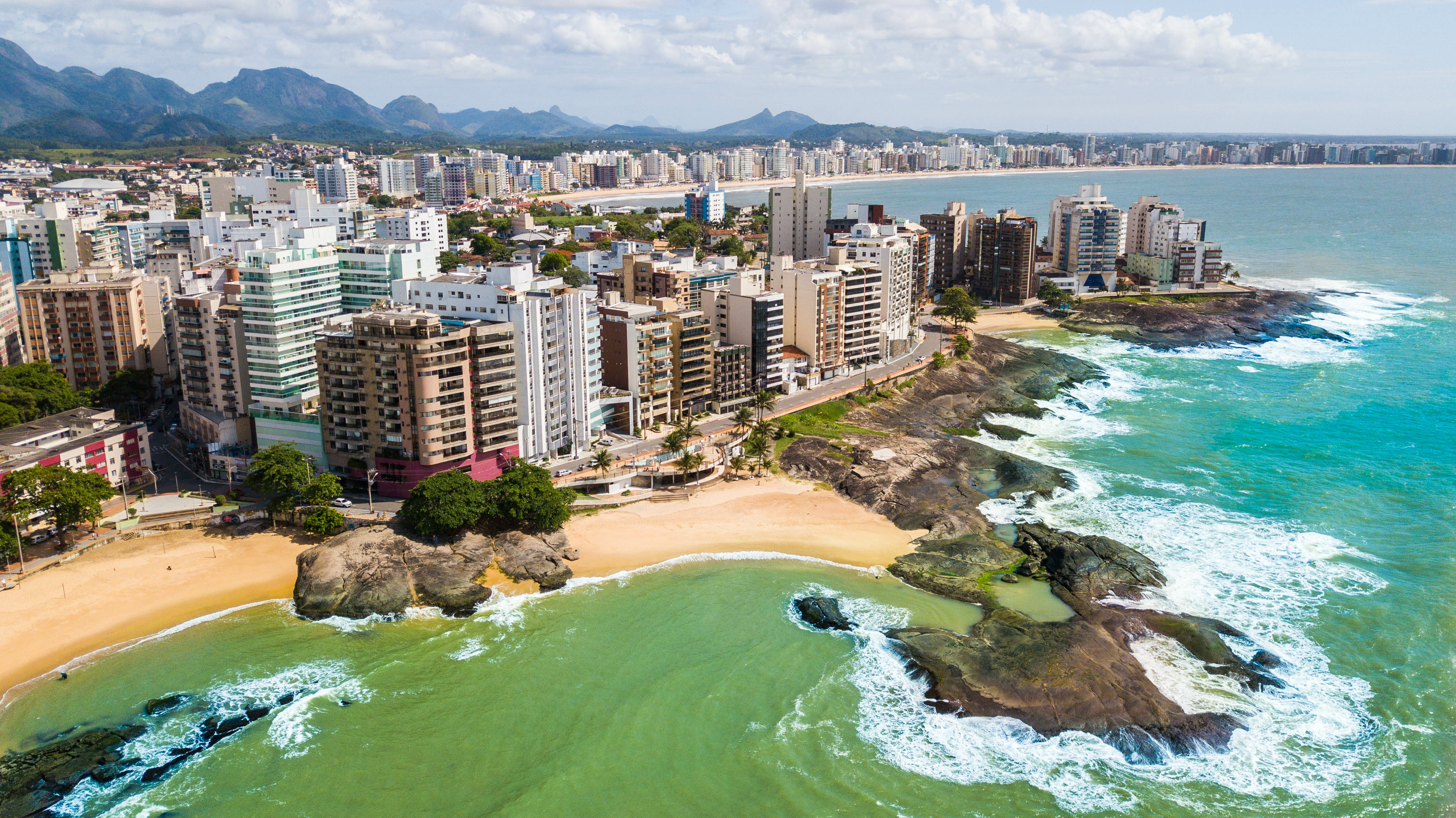
Guarapari, Espírito Santo

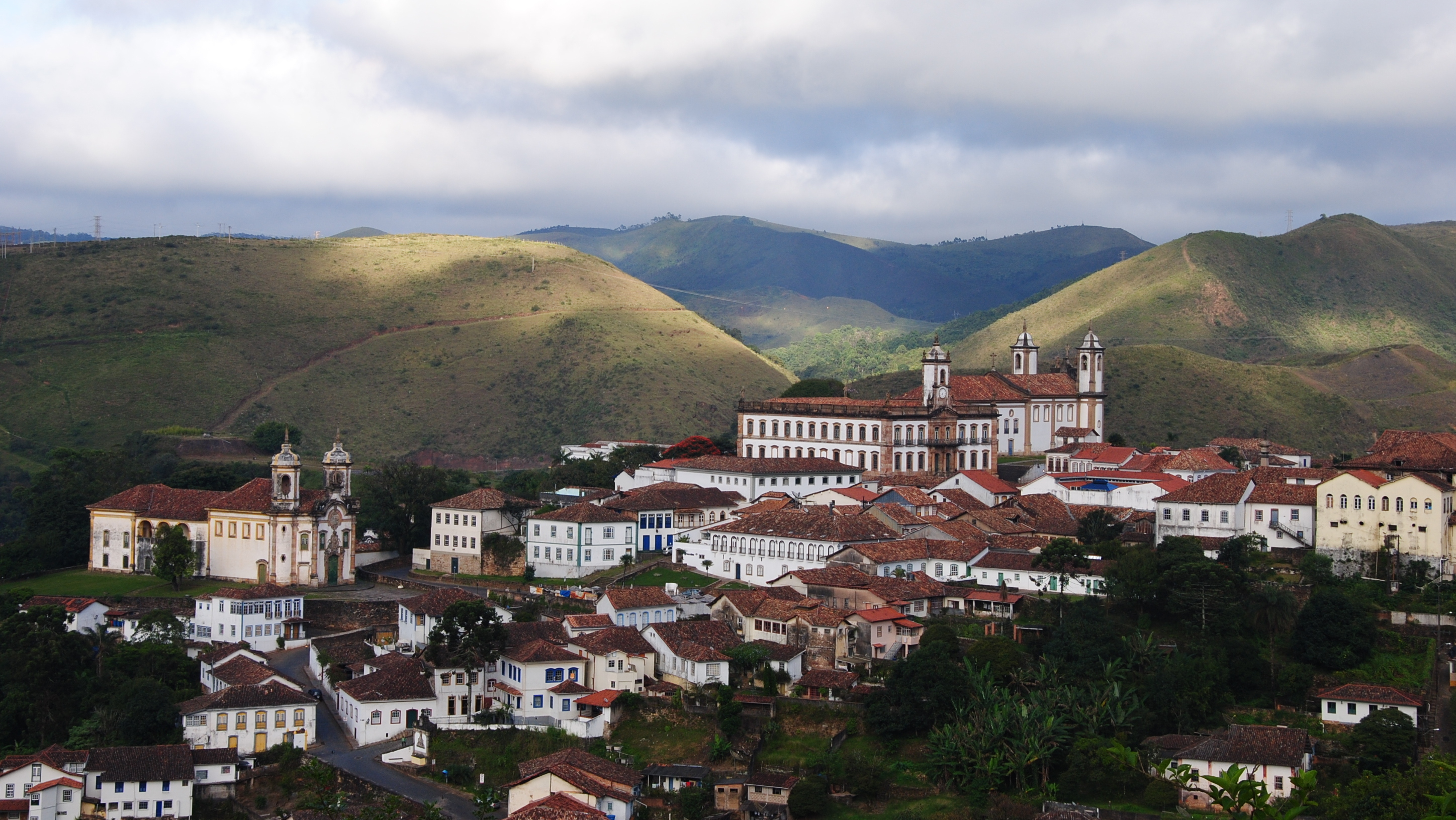
The colonial city of Ouro Preto, a World Heritage Site, is one of the most popular destinations in Minas Gerais.

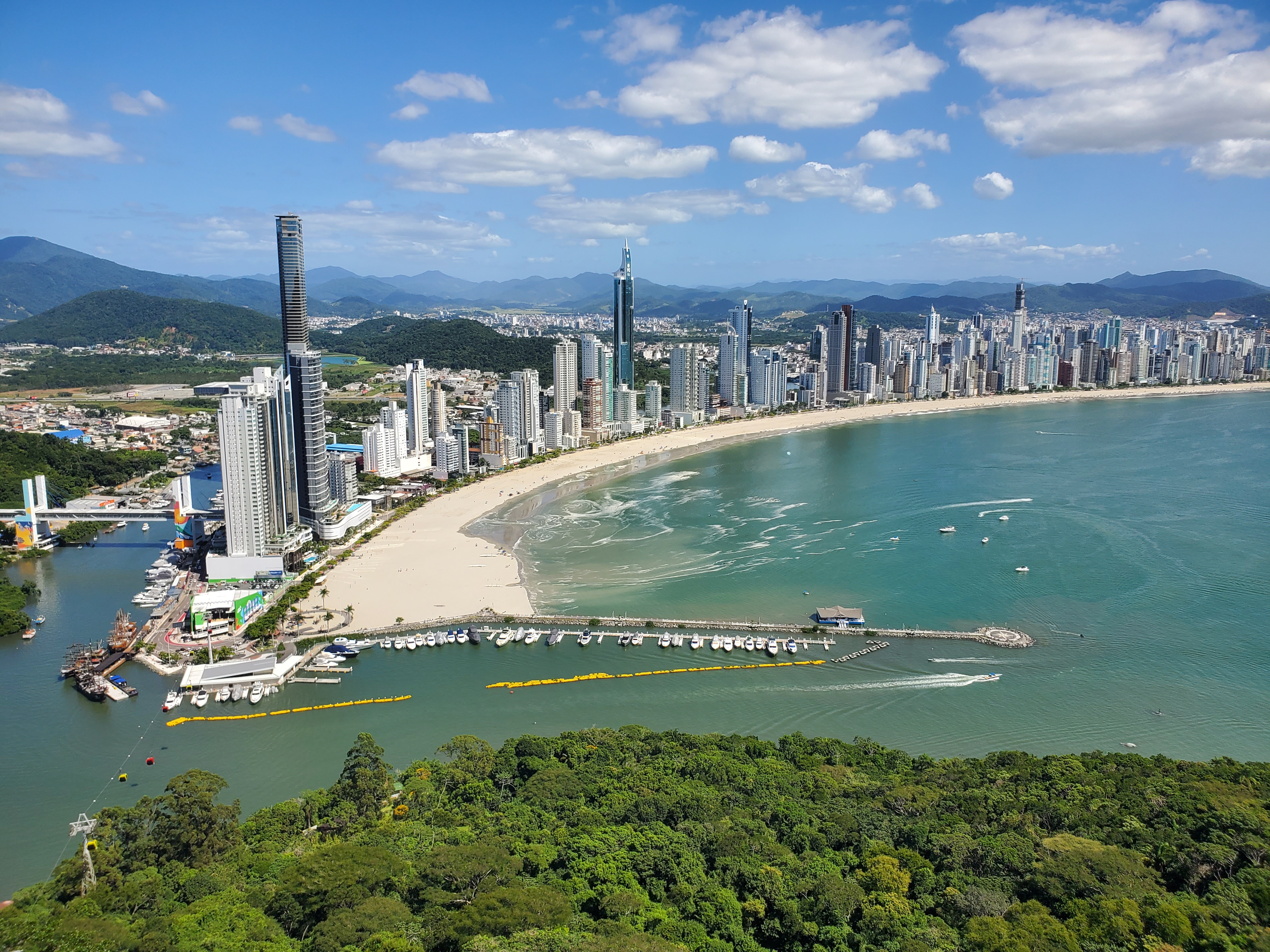
Balneário Camboriú

== See also ==
- Visa policy of Brazil
- Ministry of Tourism (Brazil)
- Tourism in the city of São Paulo
- Seven Wonders of Brazil
