= Comunidade de Quilombo de Linharinho =

Quilombo community

Linharinho – The first community recognized in the state of Espírito Santos was Linharinho, located in the Sapê do Norte region, where the municipalities of São Mateus and Conceição da Barra are located. The area was inhabited by around 12 thousand quilombola families until the end of the 1960s. With the arrival of Aracruz Celulose, this number was reduced to 1,200 families, which remain to this day in small communities amidst the company's eucalyptus trees. There are also communities in São Domingos, São Jorge, Serraria and São Cristóvão.
