= Itaúnas State Park =

State park in Espírito Santo, Brazil

- Parque Estadual de Itaúnas
- IUCN category II (national park)
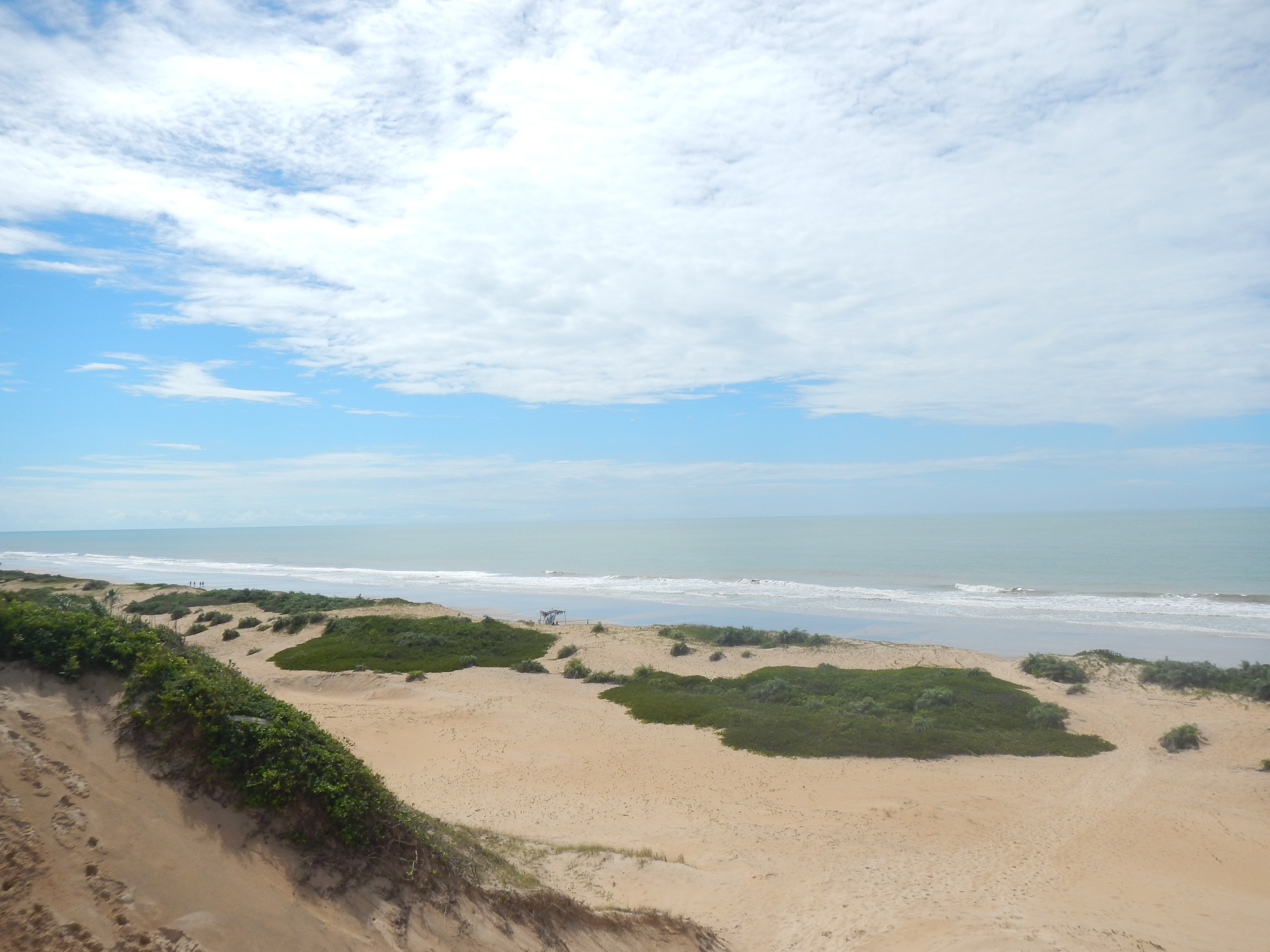
- Itaúnas sand dunes

- Location within Brazil
- Nearest city: Conceição da Barra, Espírito Santo
- Coordinates: 18.418984°S 39.707455°W
- Area: 3,481 hectares (8,600 acres)
- Designation: State park
- Administrator: IEMA: Instituto Estadual de Meio Ambiente e Recursos Hídricos

The Itaúnas State Park (Portuguese: Parque Estadual de Itaúnas) is a state park in the state of Espírito Santo, Brazil. It protects the lower reaches of the Itaúnas River and a strip of marshes, dunes and beaches along the Atlantic coast of the north of the state.

== Location ==
The Itaúnas State Park is in the municipality of Conceição da Barra, Espírito Santo. It has an area of about 3,481 hectares (8,600 acres). It protects a strip of the Atlantic coast from north of the town of Conceição da Barra, Espírito Santo, up to the border with the state of Bahia. The park is named after the Itaúnas River, which runs through the park for 34 kilometres (21 mi). The river approaches the coast at the settlement of Itaúnas and then runs southwest, parallel to the coast behind a sand bar, before entering the Atlantic Ocean to the north of Conceição da Barra. On the beaches of Itaúnas and Riacho Doce, which extend for 25 kilometres (16 mi), the dunes reach 30 metres (98 ft) in height.

== History ==
The Itaúnas State Park was created by state governor decree 4.967-E of 8 November 1991. In 1992 the park was listed by UNESCO as a World Heritage Site. It became part of the Central Atlantic Forest Ecological Corridor, created in 2002.

== Environment ==
The park contains 23 archaeological sites with traces of human settlements such as chipped stones, indigenous pottery and artifacts from the colonial era. Vegetation includes coastal forest, with fragments of forest endangered in Espírito Santo, restinga, dunes and estuarine mangroves. The various habitats are in good condition, and have great diversity of plant species, with over 414 species recorded. There are 43 species of mammals, 183 of birds. 32 of reptiles, 29 of amphibians and 101 of fish. Mammals include ocelots, capuchin monkeys and sloths. Threats include illegal fishing, hunting, firewood extraction and fruit collection, the presence of domestic animals such as horses, dogs and oxen, and irregular occupation by squatters.

== Activities ==
As of 2015 the opening hours were from 8:30 to 17:30. The park is suitable for ecotourism, hiking and swimming in the river and the ocean. Visitors may take guided horseback tours, or may explore by kayak, canoe, jeep, bicycle or on foot. There is a visitor center in the village of Itaúnas, with the headquarters of the Tamar project, which protects sea turtles. The visitor center has a display of archaeological finds, and gives workshops in crafts, local music and painting.

== Sources ==
- Lamas, Ivana Reis; Crepaldi, Maria Otávia; Mesquita, Carlos Alberto Bernardo (2015), Uma Rede no Corredor (PDF) (in Portuguese), Conservação Internacional (CI-Brasil), ISBN 978-85-98830-28-5, archived from the original (PDF) on 2019-03-29
- Parque Estadual de Itaúnas (in Portuguese), IEMA: Instituto Estadual de Meio Ambiente e Recursos Hídricos, archived from the original on 2016-10-27
- "Parque Estadual de Itaúnas", Viagem (in Portuguese), Editora Abril S.A.
- Parques Estaduais são opções de lazer gratuitas para toda a família (in Portuguese), Estado do Espírito Santo, 9 January 2012, archived from the original on 2016-10-28
- Plano de Manejo do Parque Estadual de Itaúnas (in Portuguese), vol. 1 – Informações gerais do parque, CEPEMAR – Serviços de Consultoria em Meio Ambiente, August 2004, archived from the original on 2016-10-27
