= Conceição da Barra =

- Municipality
- Municipality of Conceição da Barra
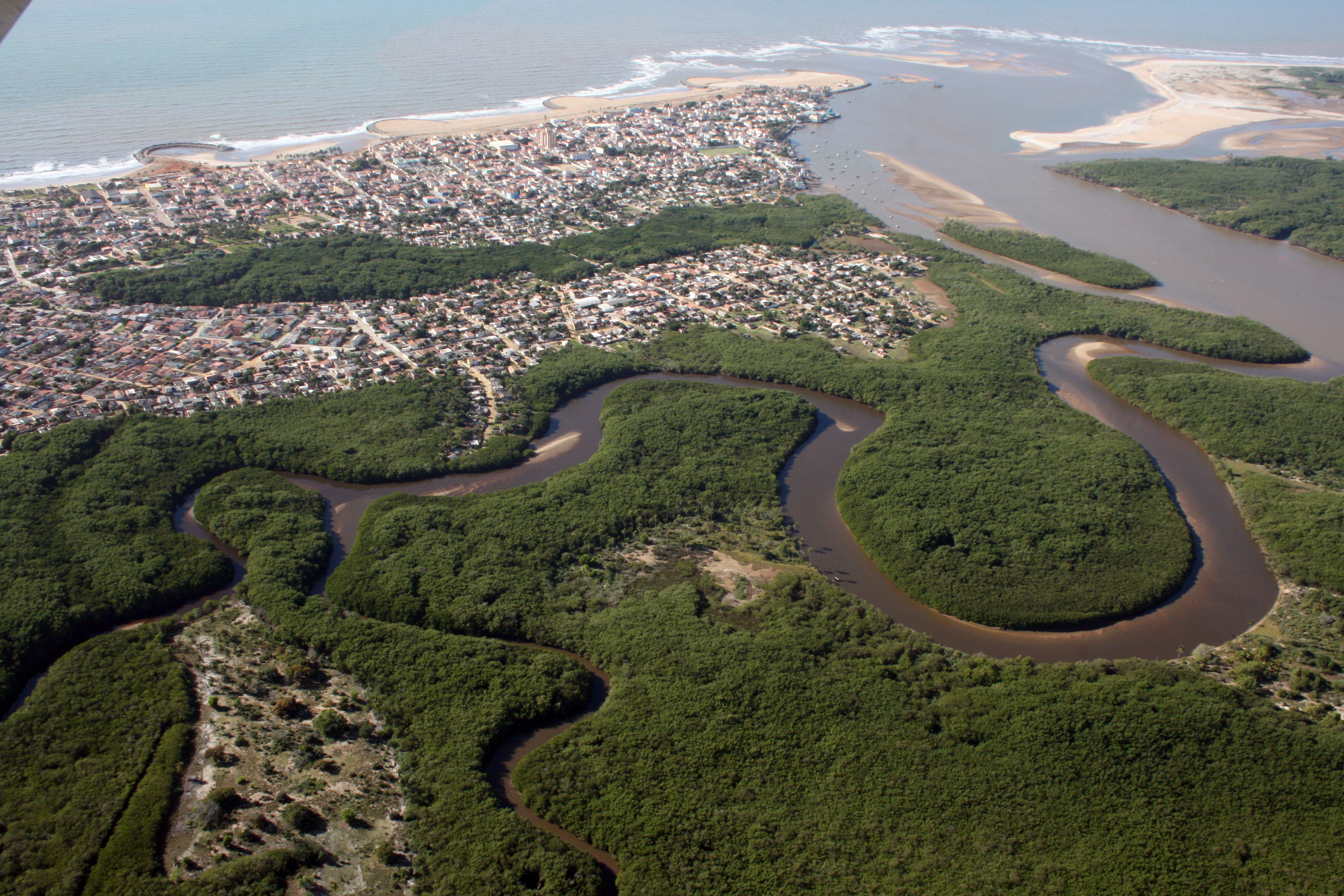
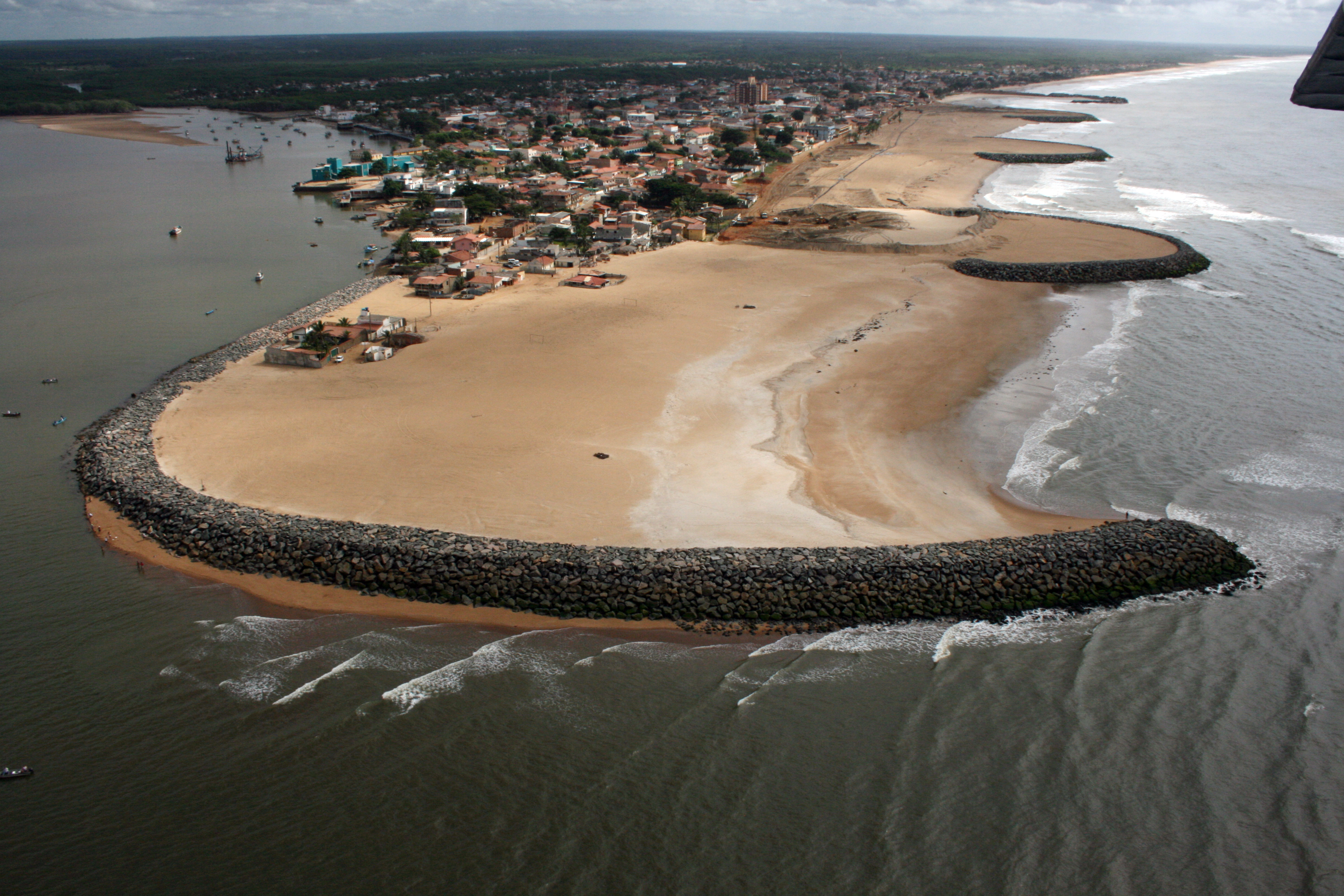
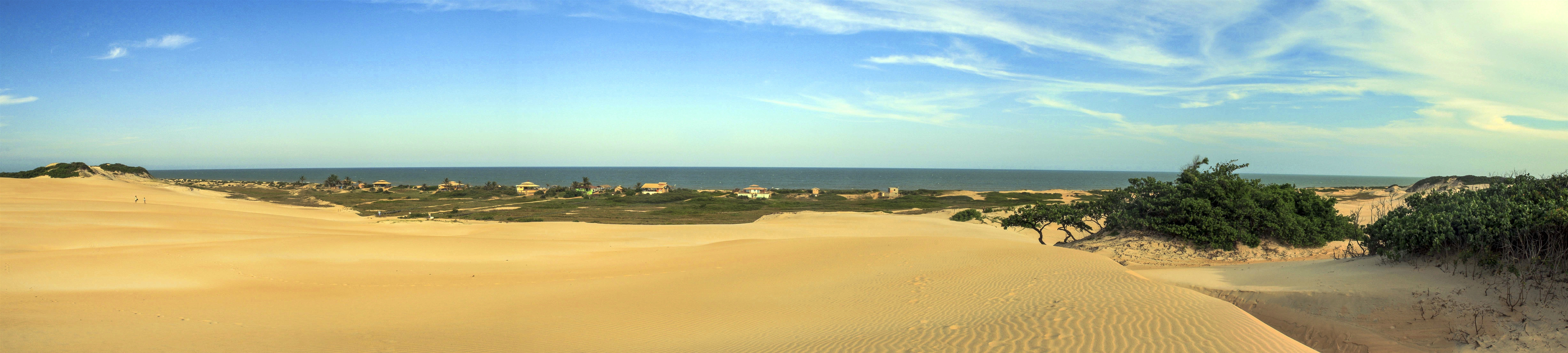

- Flag Coat of arms
- Nickname: "Barra"
- Location in Espírito Santo
- Coordinates: 18°35′34″S 39°43′55″W
- Country: Brazil
- Region: Southeast
- State: Espírito Santo
- Founded: 6 October 1891

Government
  - Mayor: Walyson José Santos Vasconcelos (PTB)

Area
  - Total: 1,182.587 km^{2} (456.599 sq mi)
- Elevation: 6 m (20 ft)

Population (2022)
  - Total: 27,458
  - Density: 23.219/km^{2} (60.136/sq mi)
- Time zone: UTC−3 (BRT)
- Postal Code: 29960-000 to 29969-999
- Area code: +55 27
- HDI (2010): 0.681 – medium
- Website: conceicaodabarra.es.gov.br

Conceição da Barra is a Brazilian municipality in the state of Espírito Santo. The city is the northernmost coastal city of the state. Its population was 31,273 (2020) and its area is 1,188.044 km^{2} (458.706 sq mi).

== Geography ==
The municipality contains the 3,481 hectares (8,600 acres) Itaúnas State Park, created in 1991, which protects the coast up to the border with Bahia. It contains the 2,817 hectares (6,960 acres) Rio Preto National Forest. It contains part of the 1,503.75 hectares (3,715.8 acres) Córrego Grande Biological Reserve.

The climate is tropical, warm and mostly humid, with one or two dry months. Average annual temperature is 22 to 24 °C (72 to 75 °F), and average annual rainfall is 1,250 to 1,500 millimetres (49 to 59 in).
