= Boiçucanga =

Beach in the state of São Paulo in Brazil

Coordinates: 23°46′59″S 45°37′28″W

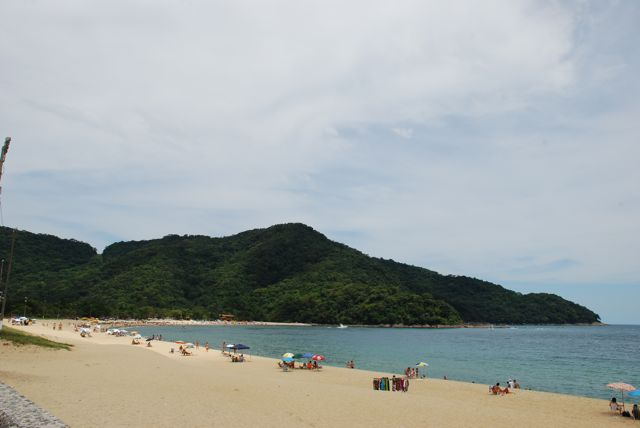
Boiçucanga beach seen from the Northwest.

Boiçucanga is a beach and neighborhood in the city of São Sebastião, Brazil, located on São Paulo state's northern coastline. The name comes from the Tupiniquim Indian language. Boi means snake. Açu means big and Canga means head. The sea at the beach is calm and has thick, yellowish sand. The water is a crystal turquoise color.
