= Brazilian helicopter carrier Atlântico =

Landing ship and flagship of Brazilian Navy

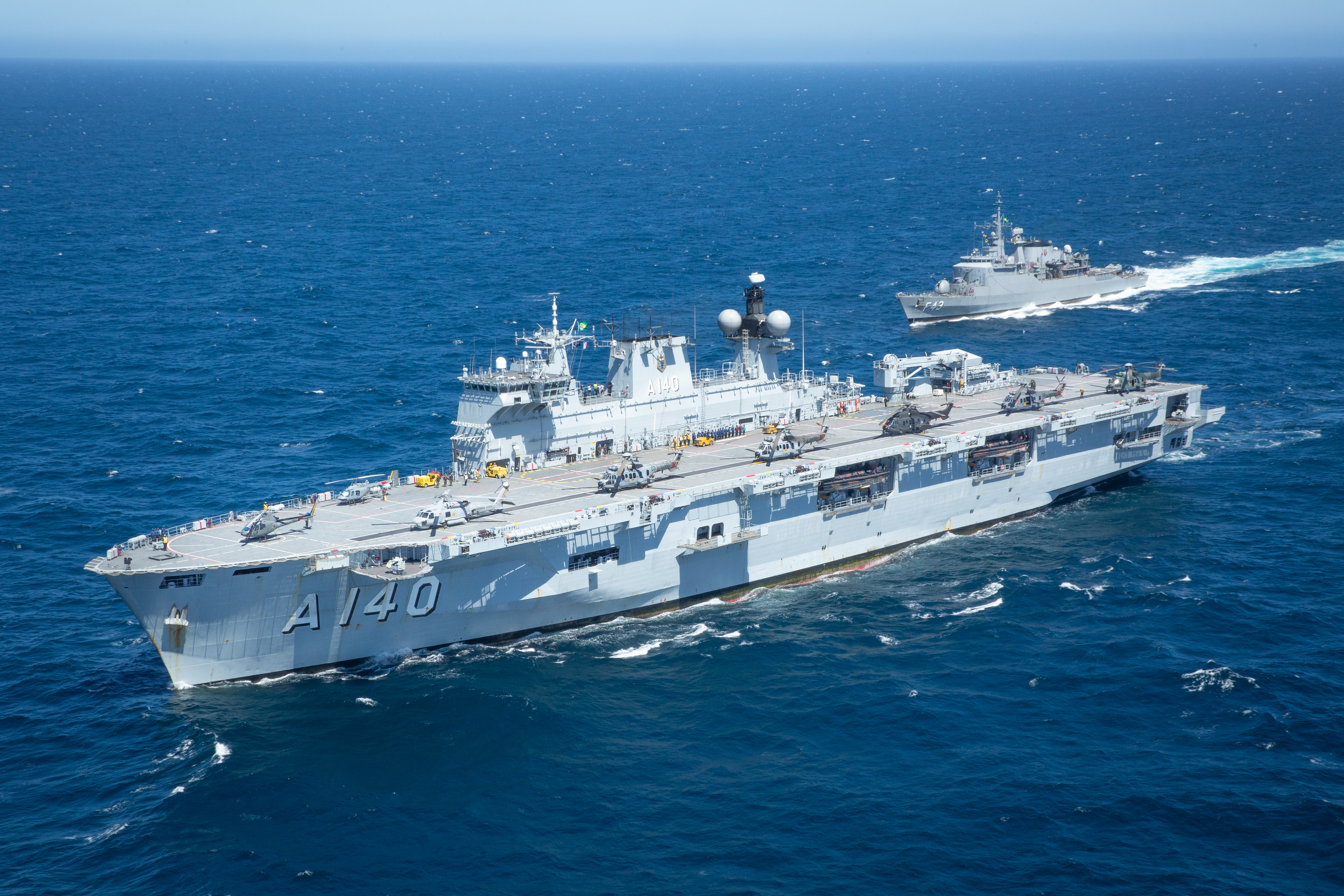
- NAM Atlântico in 2021

History

United Kingdom
- Name: HMS Ocean
- Operator: Royal Navy
- Ordered: 11 May 1993
- Builder: Vickers Shipbuilding and Engineering Ltd, Kværner (Govan)
- Laid down: 30 May 1994
- Launched: 11 October 1995
- Sponsored by: Queen Elizabeth II of the United Kingdom
- Commissioned: 30 September 1998
- Decommissioned: 27 March 2018
- Refit: Major 2012–2014
- Home port: HMNB Devonport, Plymouth
- Identification: IMO number: 9079456; MMSI number: 234643000; Callsign: GCOU
- Motto: Ex undis surgit victoria (From the waves rises victory)
- Honours and awards: Al Faw 2003
- Fate: Sold to Brazil

Brazil
- Name: NAM Atlântico
- Acquired: Purchased on 19 February 2018, from the Royal Navy
- Commissioned: 29 June 2018
- Home port: Arsenal de Marinha do Rio de Janeiro
- Identification: IMO number: 9079456; MMSI number: 710509000; Callsign: PWTL; Pennant number: A140
- Motto: Nosso navio, nosso mar (Our ship, our sea)
- Status: Active
- Badge

General characteristics
- Class & type: Amphibious Assault Ship
- Displacement: 21,500 t (21,200 long tons; 23,700 short tons)
- Length: 203.4 m (667 ft)
- Beam: 35 m (115 ft)
- Draught: 6.5 m (21 ft)
- Propulsion: 2x Crossley Pielstick PC2 Mk-6 MW 12 cylinder.
- Speed: 10 knots (12 mph; 19 km/h) cruise; 18 knots (21 mph; 33 km/h) max
- Range: 8,000 miles (13,000 km)
- Boats & landing craft carried: 1 Seaboat (Pacific 22 Mk2); 4 × LCVP Mk5B
- Capacity: 40 vehicles
- Troops: 830
- Crew: 285 + 180 aviation personnel
- Sensors & processing systems: Type 997 Artisan radar; Type 1008 Navigational Radar; 2 × Type 1007 Aircraft Control Radar
- Electronic warfare & decoys: UAT Electronic Support Measures; DLH decoy Launchers; Surface Ship Torpedo Defence (SSTD)
- Armament: 4 × 30mm DS30M Mk2 guns; 4 × Miniguns; 8 × General purpose machine guns
- Aircraft carried: Up-to 18 helicopters: EC725 Caracal; S-70B Seahawk; AS350 Écureuil
- Aviation facilities: Large flight deck; Hangar deck; Helicopter lifts; Vehicle deck
- Notes: To see troops carried, armament and aircraft carried while in service with the Royal Navy; See HMS Ocean

NAM Atlântico (A140) (previously PHM Atlântico (A140)) is an amphibious helicopter carrier and current flagship of the Brazilian Navy. Originally constructed in the United Kingdom for service with the Royal Navy as a landing platform helicopter, she was commissioned on 30 September 1998 as HMS Ocean, serving until being decommissioned on 27 March 2018, and then commissioned into service with Brazil the following June.

== History ==
In 2017, media outlets began reporting that Brazil was interested in purchasing Ocean as a replacement for the aircraft carrier São Paulo, which was withdrawn from service in 2017 following multiple mechanical failures. The Royal Navy released an asking price of £80.3 million ($105.8 million USD), which the Brazilian Navy called "convenient". In November 2017, the Brazilian Ministry of Defense began formal negotiations for the acquisition of the ship.

In December 2017, the Brazilian Navy confirmed the purchase of the ship for £84.6 million, equivalent to R$359.5M and USD $113.2M. Following her decommissioning from Royal Navy service in March 2018, she would undertake a period of maintenance in the United Kingdom and was expected to arrive in Rio de Janeiro by 25 August 2018, with the intention of being commissioned and fully operational by 2020. Brazilian defence officials confirmed the purchase, as well as officials from the UK MoD, as of 17 February 2018.

The Brazilian Navy commissioned the multi-purpose helicopter carrier Atlântico (A140) on 29 June in the United Kingdom. The helicopter carrier package for Brazil includes an Artisan 3D search radar, KH1007 surface surveillance radar system, four 30 mm DS30M Mk 2 remote weapon systems and four Mk 5B landing craft. However, the three original 20 mm Mk 15 Block 1B Phalanx close-in weapon systems, the torpedo defence systems and 7.62 mm M134 machine guns were removed from the ship before the transfer to Brazil. The ship displaces 21,578 tonnes, is 203.43 m long and has a range of 8,000 n miles. The ship underwent maintenance work by Babcock and BAE Systems in February.

The ship was scheduled to reach her homeport, Arsenal de Marinha do Rio de Janeiro (AMRJ), on 25 August, where Atlântico underwent operational sea training under the Royal Navy's Flag Officer Sea Training.

On 12 November 2020, Atlântico was redesignated "NAM", for "multipurpose aircraft carrier" (Portuguese: Navio Aeródromo Multipropósito), from "PHM", for "multipurpose helicopter carrier" (Portuguese: Porta-Helicópteros Multipropósito), to reflect her capability to operate with fixed-wing medium-altitude long-endurance unmanned aerial vehicles as well as crewed tiltrotor VTOL aircraft.

In 23 February 2023, the vessel was sent to the port of São Sebastião to provide a field hospital for rescue efforts during the 2023 São Paulo floods and landslides. On board, the vessel carried 28 medics of several specialties including surgeons, dentists and orthopedists and 180 marines who were designated to operate heavy machinery in aid of the search and rescue efforts.

== Gallery ==
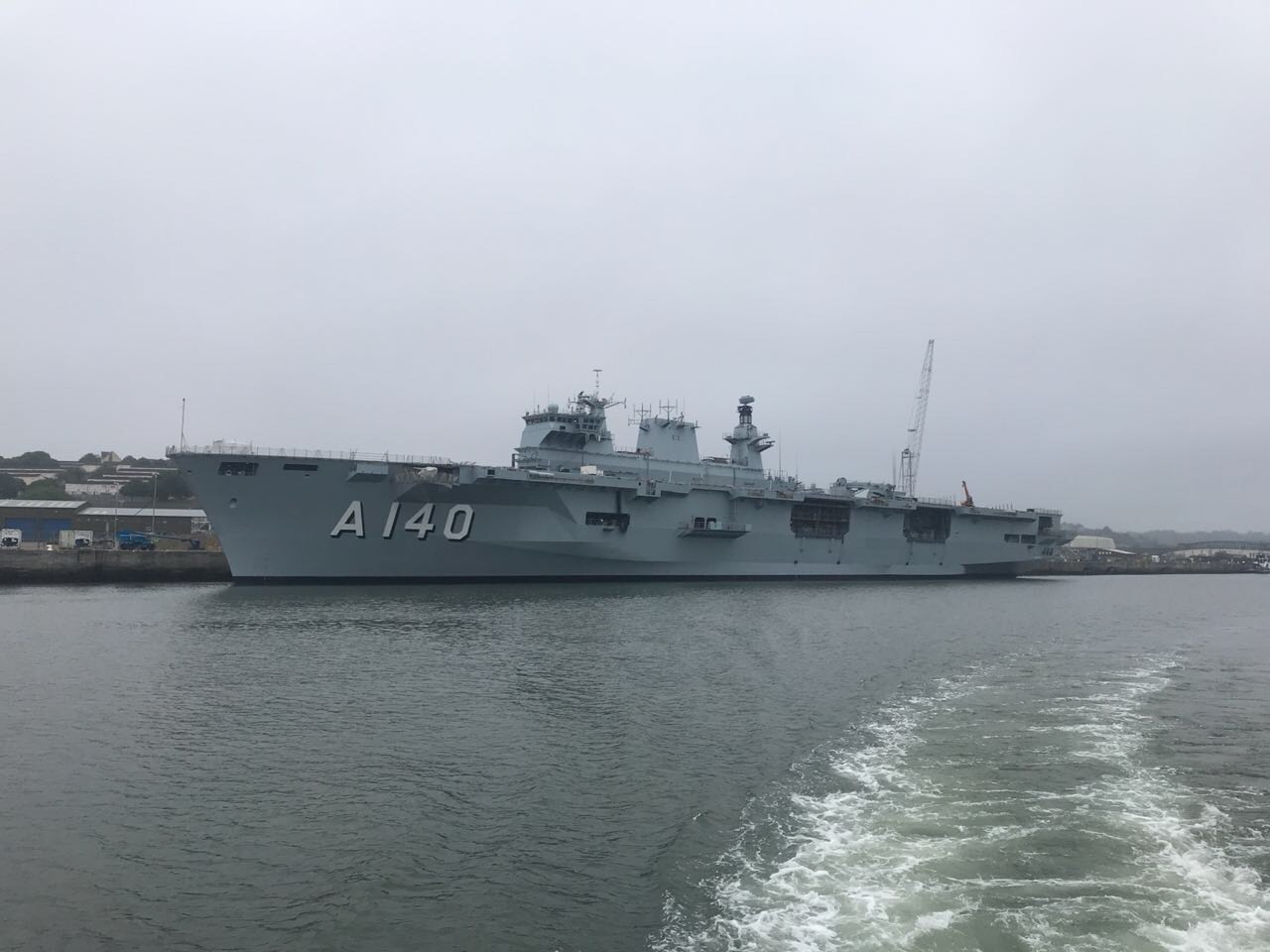

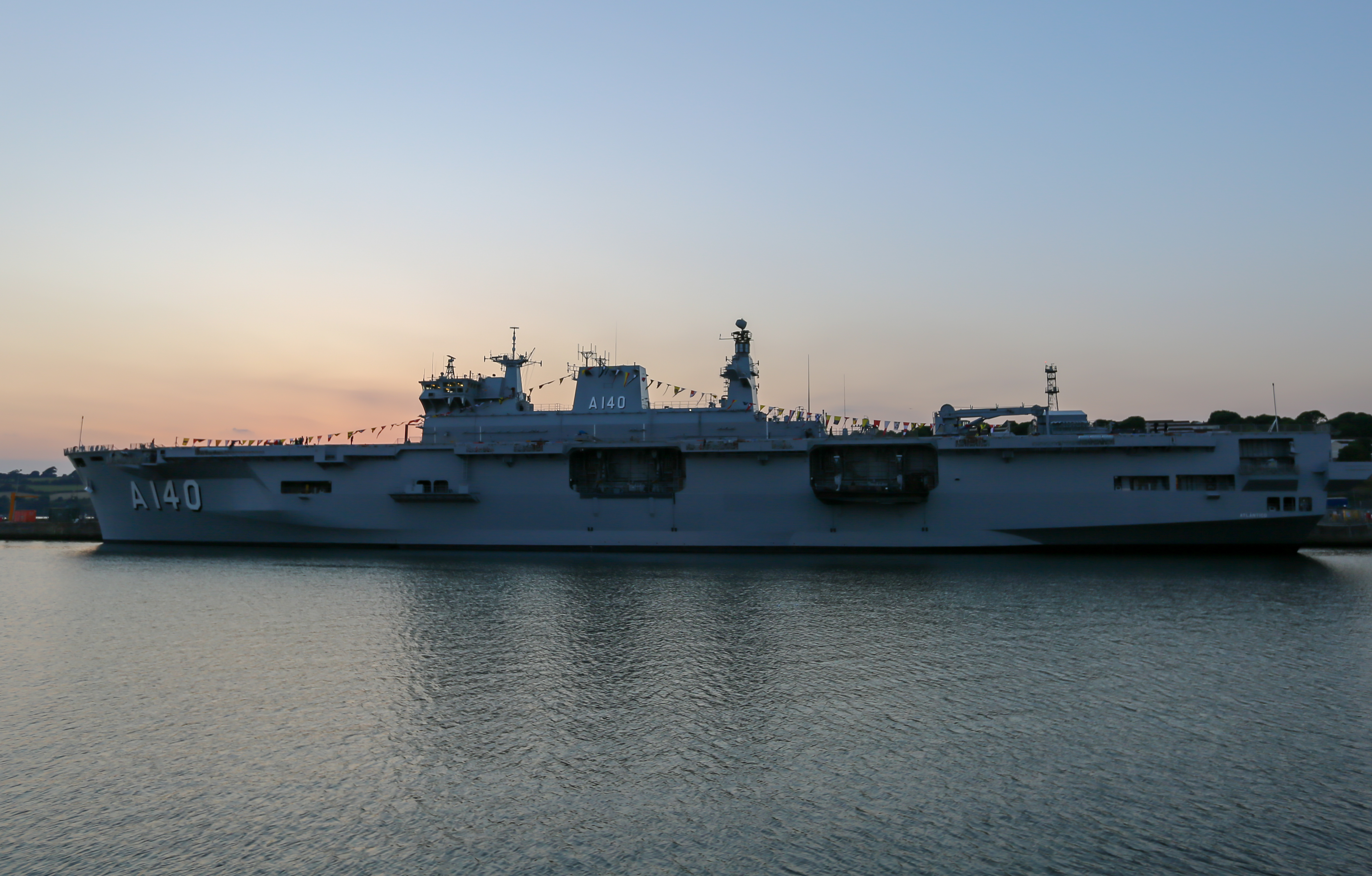

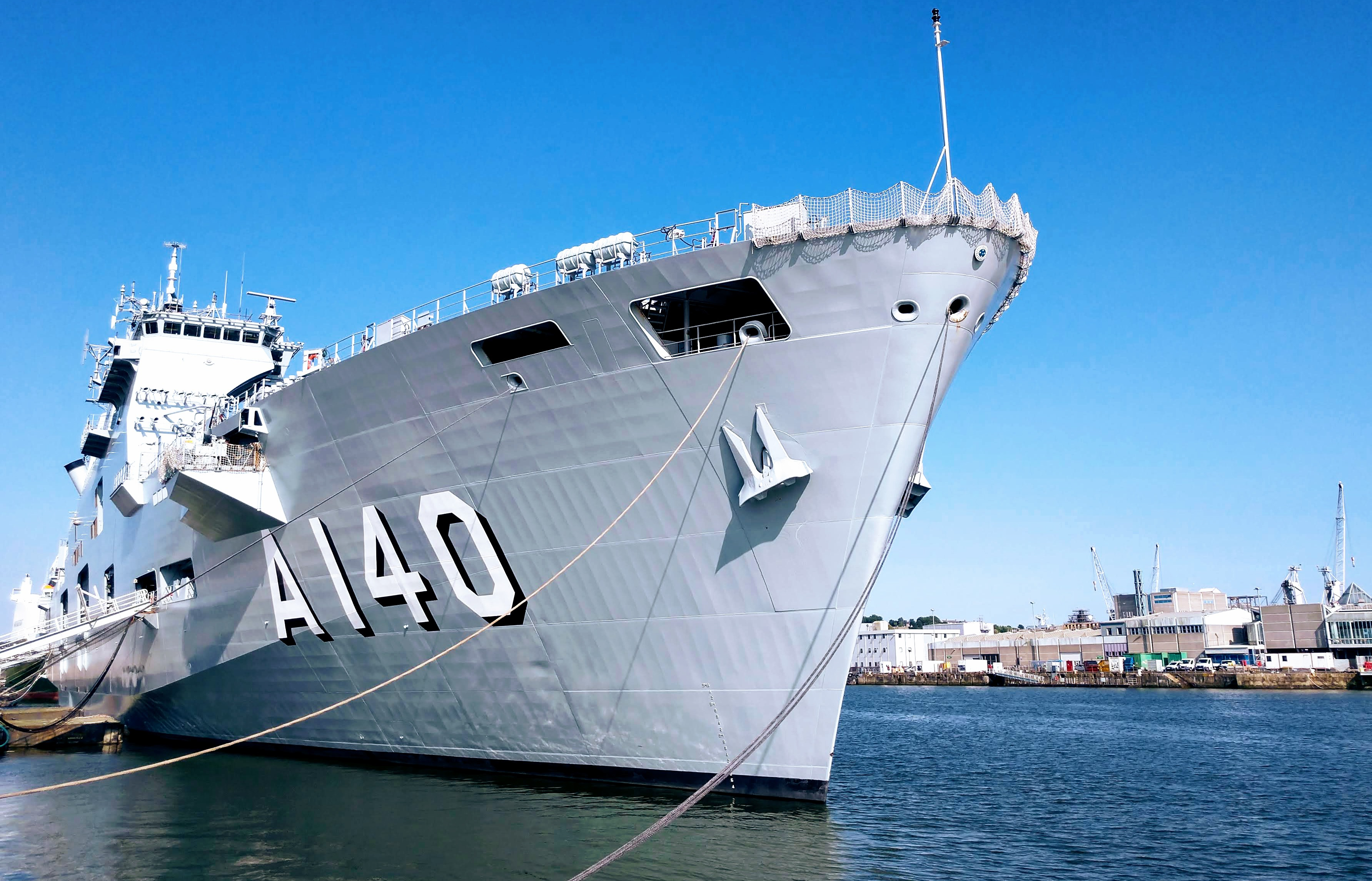

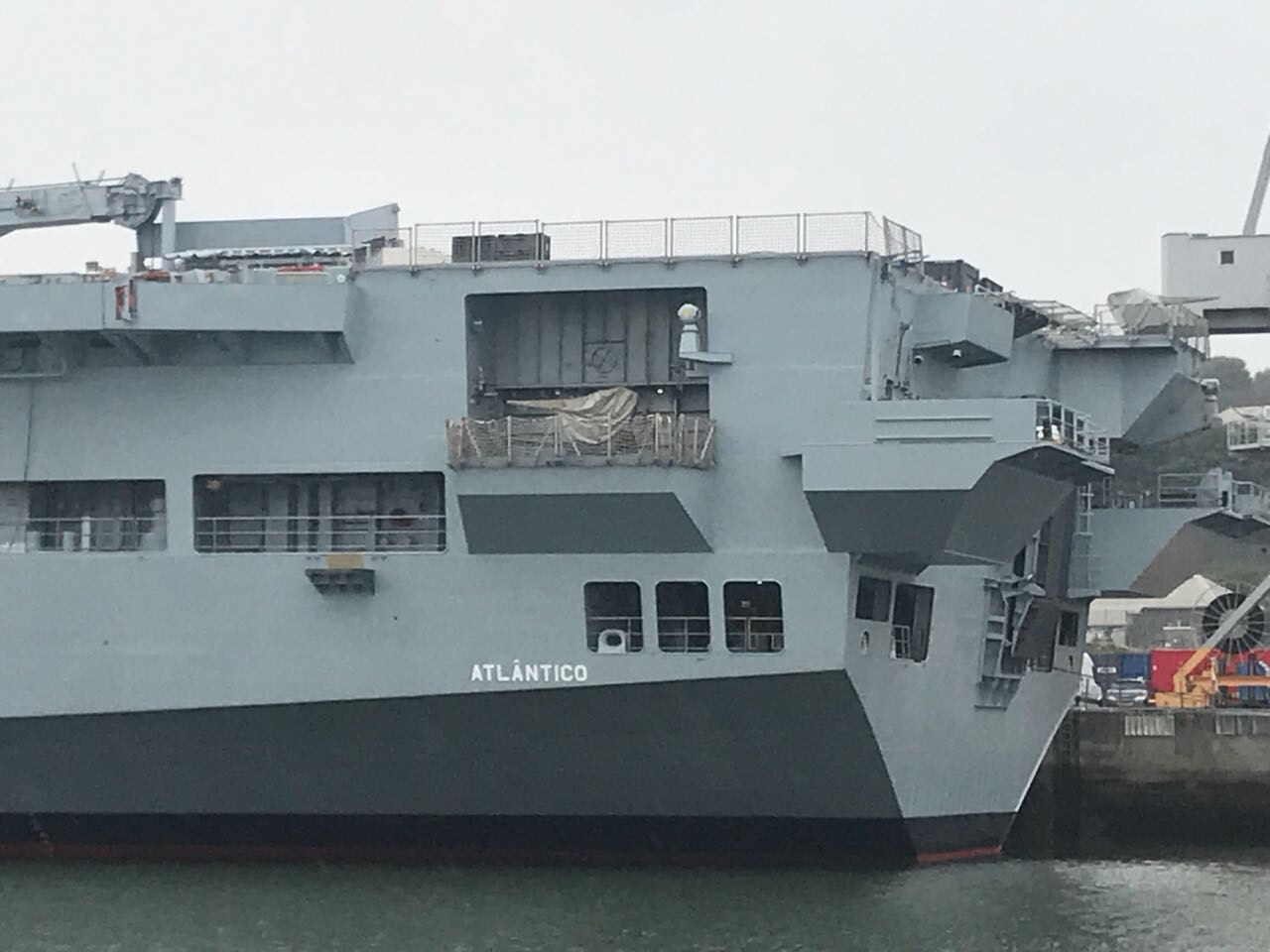

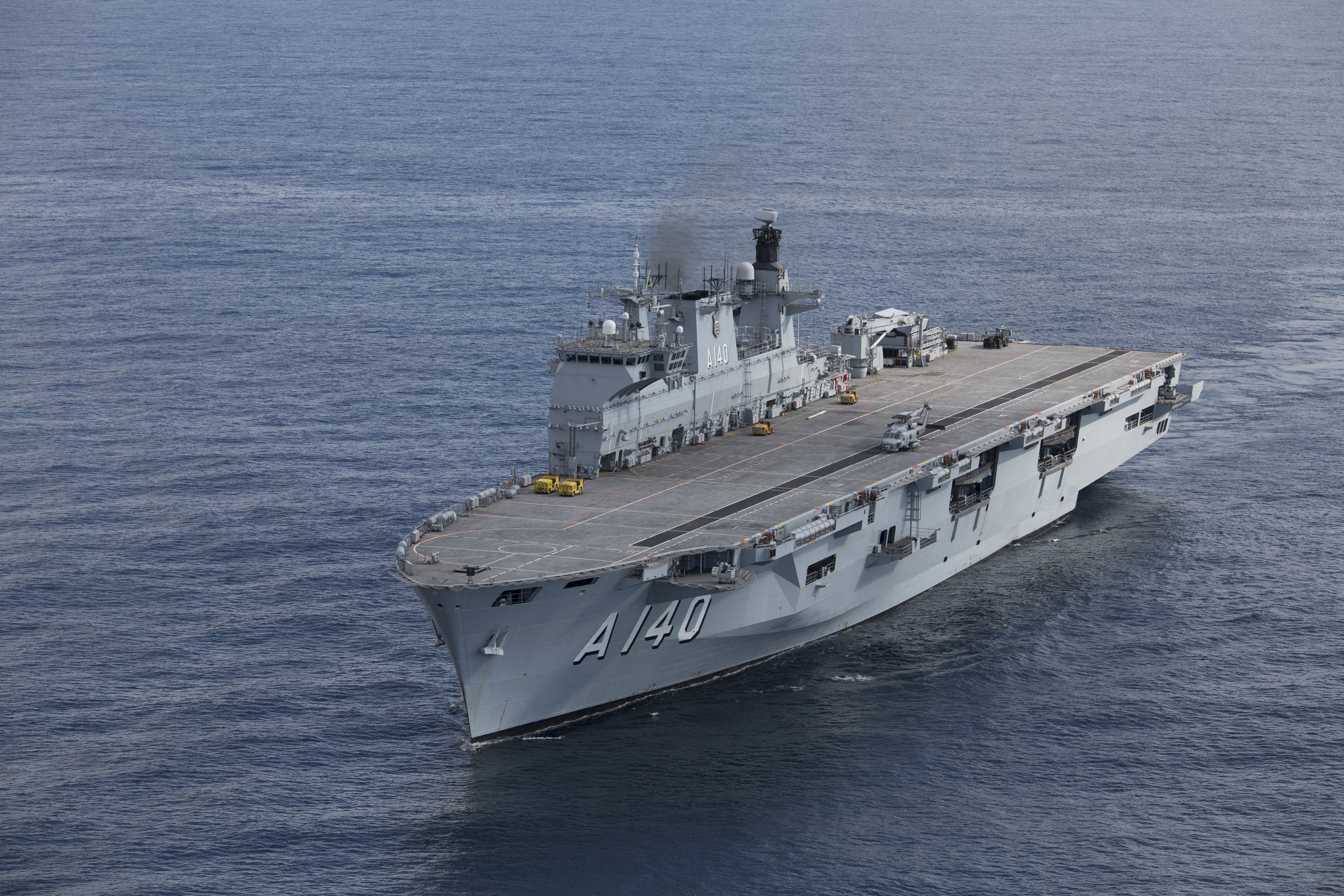

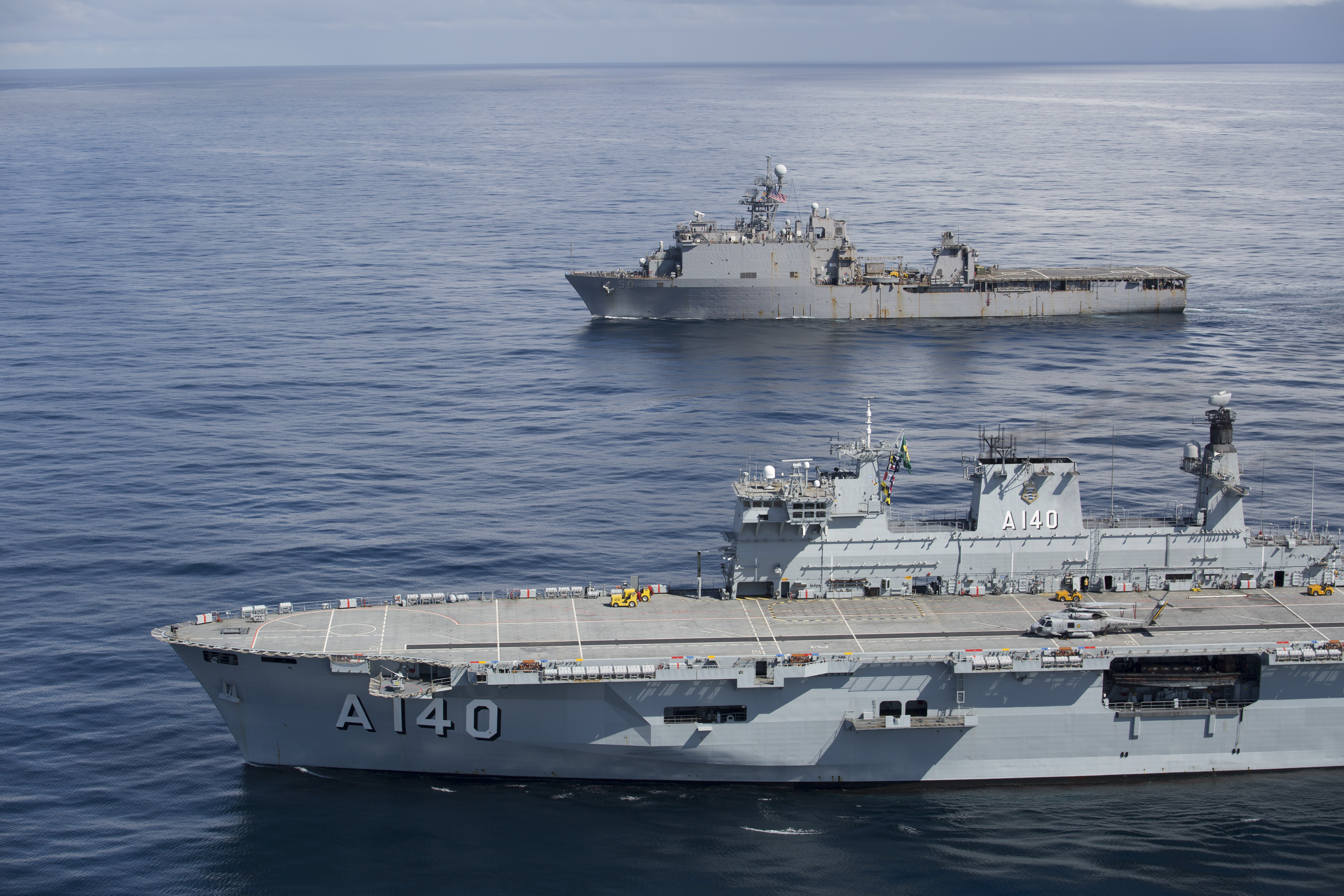

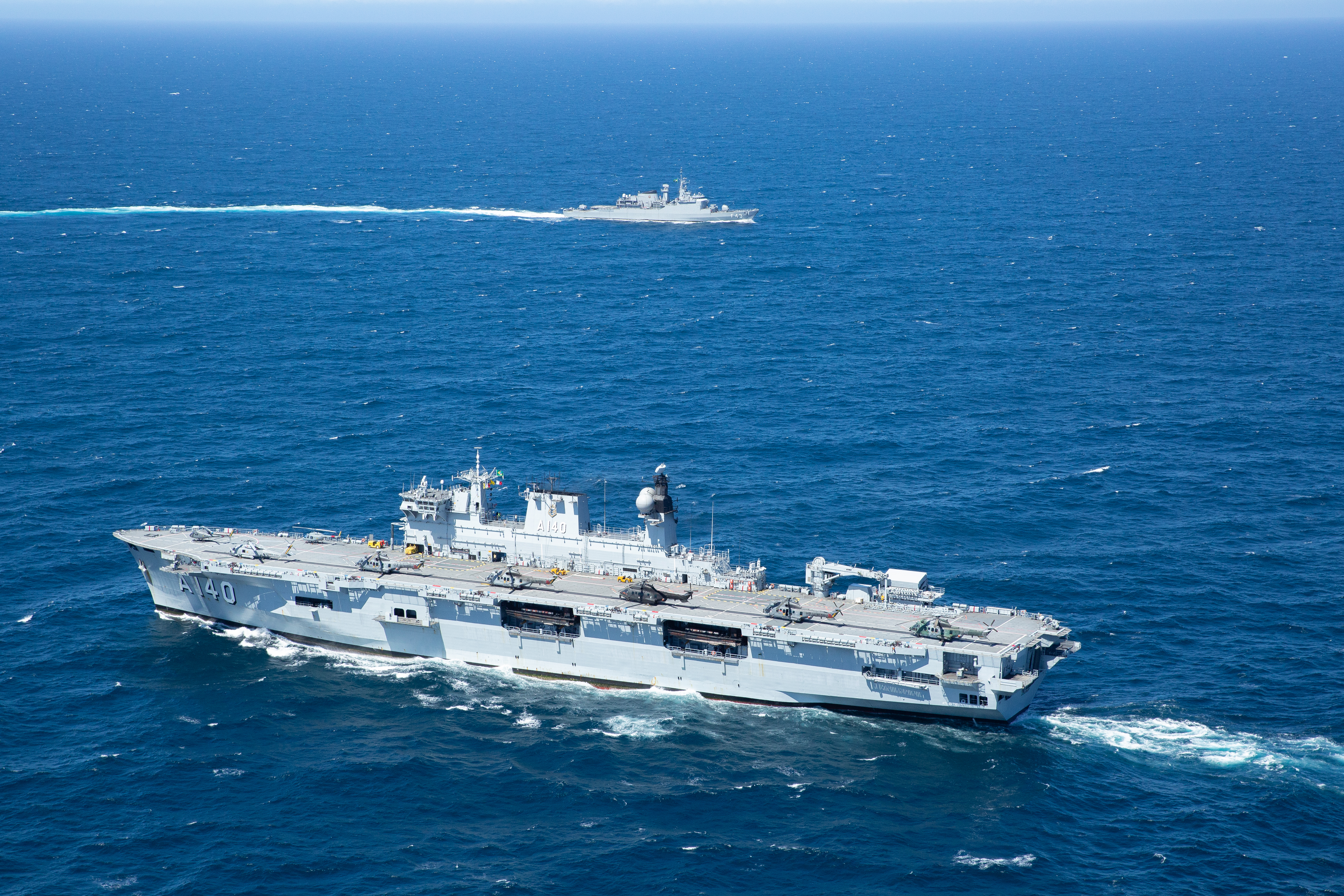

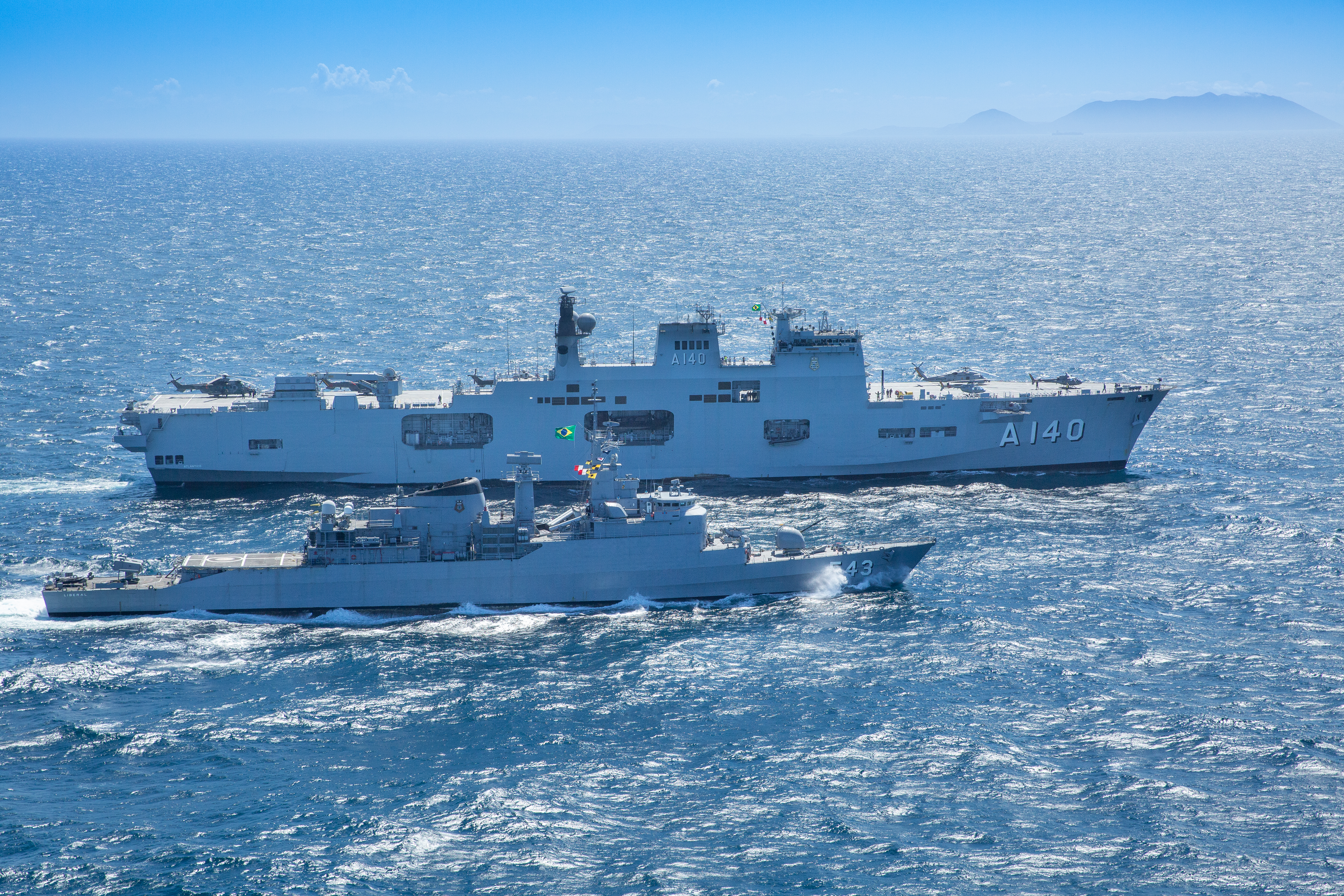

== See also ==
- List of ships of the Brazilian Navy
