= 2023 São Paulo floods and landslides =

Natural disaster in Brazil

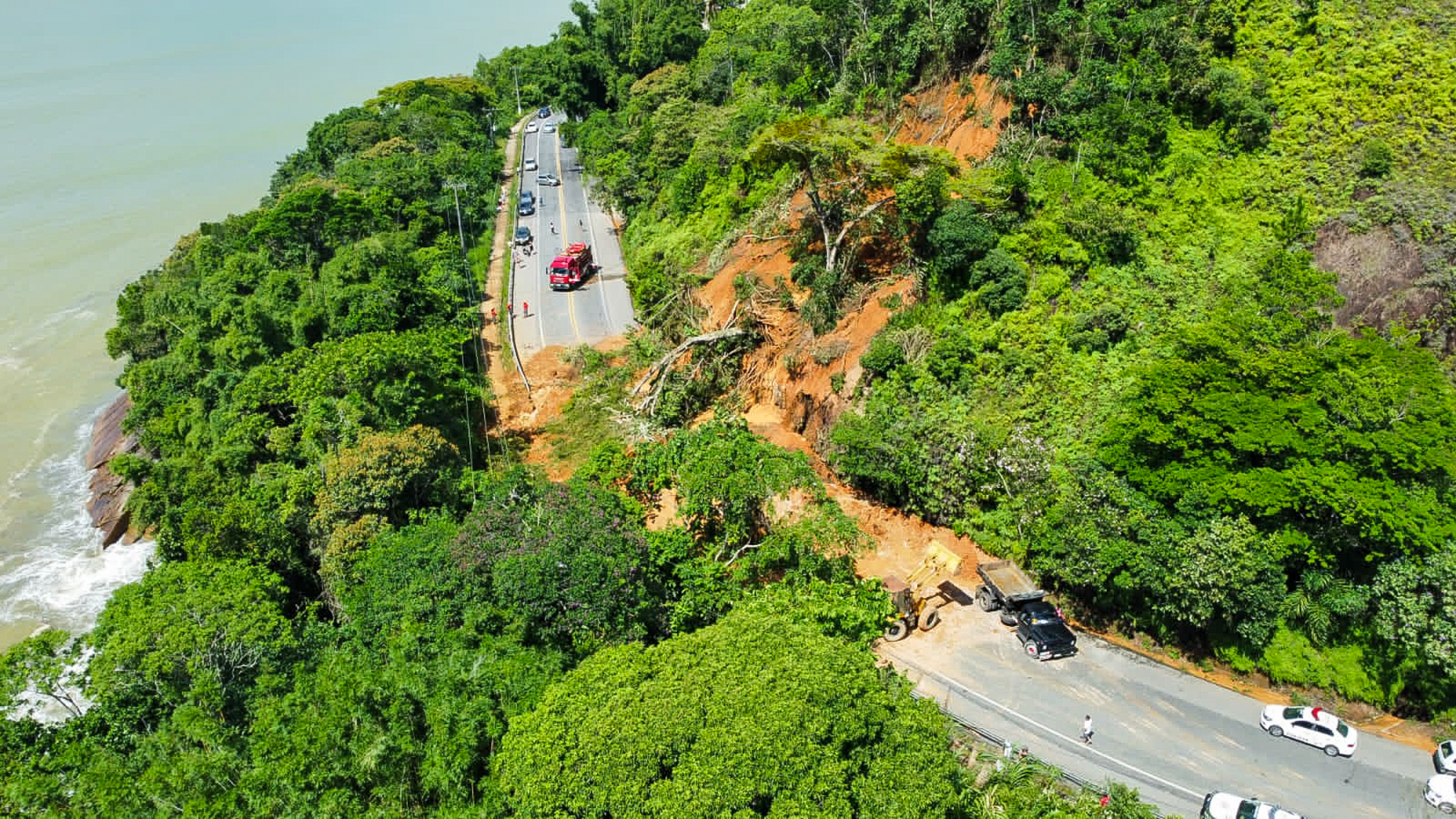
- A landslide along highway SP-55 in Ubatuba, near Lagoinha
- Date: 18-23 February 2023
- Location: São Paulo, Brazil
- Cause: Heavy rains
- Deaths: 65
- Injuries: 24
- Missing: 58

During the 2023 Brazilian Carnival holiday weekend, record-breaking rainfall—reaching 682 mm (26.9 in) in 24 hours—caused deadly floods and landslides across the state of São Paulo. 65 people were killed, of which 64 were in São Sebastião.

== Background ==
The affected regions of São Paulo were located in coastal communities surrounded by mountains. On 18–19 February 2023, an area of low pressure off the coast of Brazil brought moist onshore flow, leading to significant rainfall in the region. The São Paulo mountains enhanced the rainfall through an orographic lift. A total of 682 mm (26.9 in) fell in just 24 hours in Bertioga just outside of São Sebastião. The city observed 626 mm (24.6 in) in the same period. Other significant totals include 395 mm (15.6 in) in Guarujá, 337 mm (13.3 in) in Ilhabela, and 335 mm (13.2 in) in Ubatuba. The rainfall in Bertioga was the greatest such total in a 24-hour span on record in the country. This far exceeded the previous record of 530 mm (21 in) on 15 February 2022, which had also caused deadly floods in Petrópolis. Meteorologists at MetSul Meteorologia suggested this could be among the highest non-tropical cyclone rainfall totals in the world.

Additional rains on 21 February exacerbated conditions. The local meteorological agency warned of further rains on 22 and 23 February.

== Impact ==
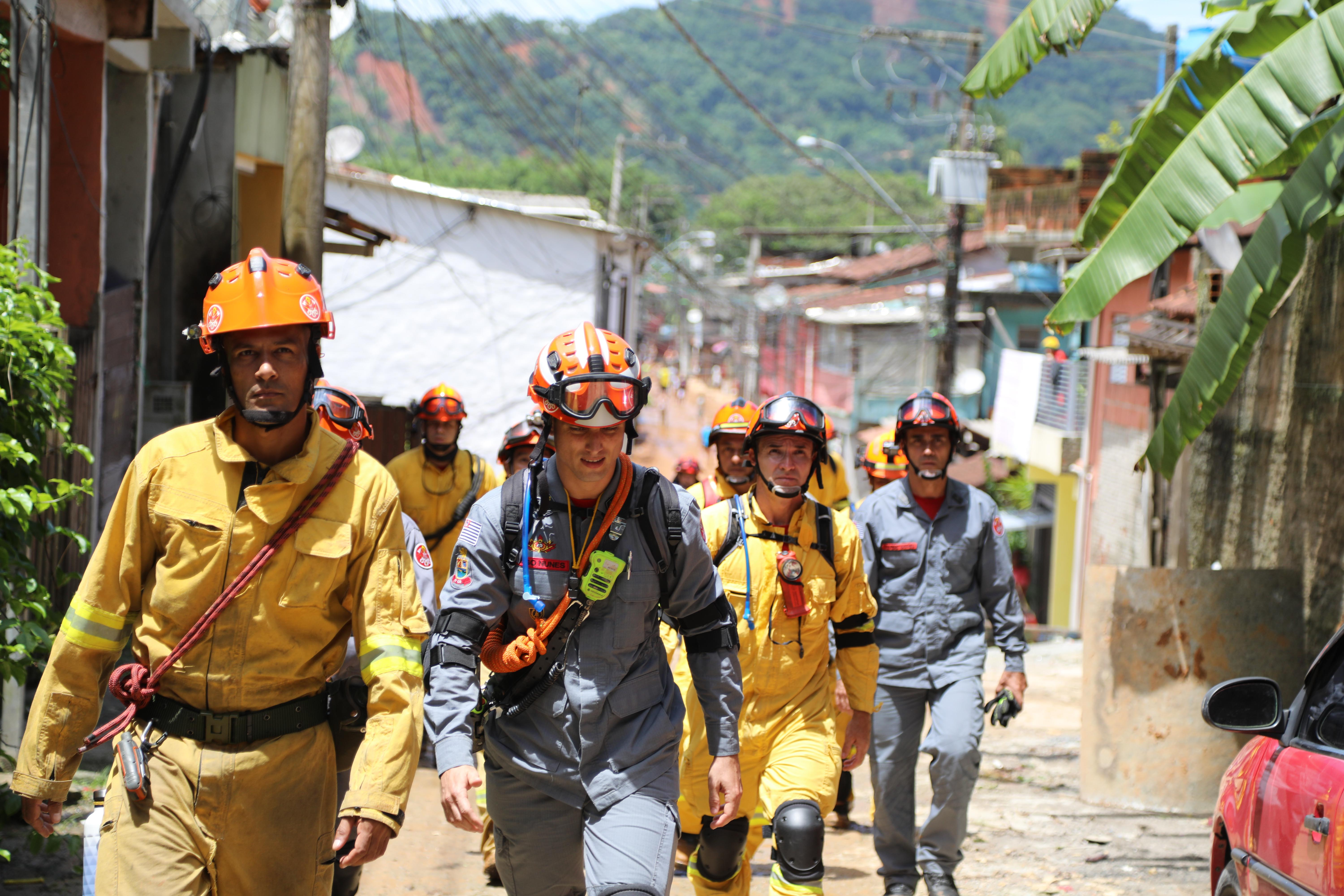
Rescue operations in São Sebastião

The prolific rains caused a cascade of landslides and mudslides across São Paulo, with the city of São Sebastião being especially hard-hit. As of 21 February, authorities confirmed 44 fatalities, with 43 of those in São Sebastião and the rest in Ubatuba. As of 26 February, the number of deaths increased to 65, with 64 of those in São Sebastião. A further 24 people suffered injuries, six seriously, and dozens of people remain missing. At least 50 homes were destroyed in São Sebastião. At least 2,496 people were displaced or left homeless. The Rio-Santos highway, the main road in the region connecting it to Rio de Janeiro state, suffered extensive damage, with numerous landslides covering or destroying stretches of the road. Another road connecting Santos with Bertioga was blocked off.

Landslides from the rainfall on 21 February impacted Juqueí, displacing 80 people.

Wind exceeding 55 km/h (34 mph; 30 kn) and waves of more than 1 m (3.3 ft) prompted the closure of the Port of Santos on 18 February.

== Response ==
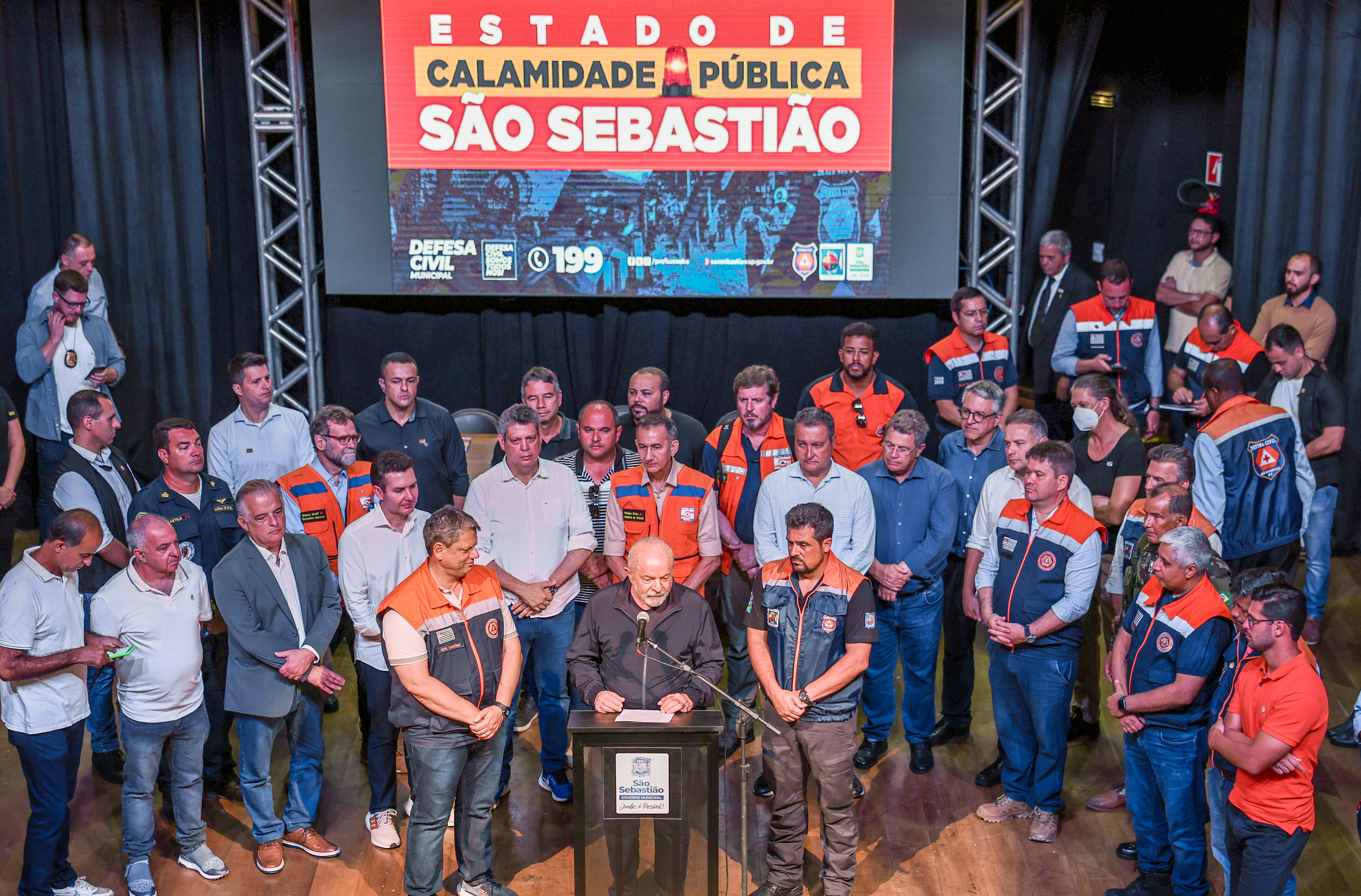
Lula and Tarcísio de Freitas during the visit to the affected areas

Local emergency management agencies quickly dispatched more than 100 firefighters for search and rescue operations. By 21 February, more than 600 personnel from the Government of the State of São Paulo, the Brazilian Army, the Federal Police, the municipal government of São Sebastião, and volunteers were on the ground searching for survivors. A two-year-old and a mother in the middle of giving birth were rescued from what they called "a sea of mud". By 21 February, 7.5 tons of relief goods including food, water and hygiene kits were distributed in São Paulo. Some aid efforts were hampered due to criminal activities like looting trucks carrying donations.

Governor Tarcísio de Freitas declared a state of emergency for 5 cities on 20 February. A 180-day "state of calamity" was subsequently declared for São Paulo. That day, Brazilian President Luiz Inácio Lula da Silva toured the affected areas and stated that São Sebastião would be rebuilt in safer areas. He advised those living on the hillsides to move to other locations. On 22 February, the NAM Atlântico set sail from the Rio de Janeiro Navy Arsenal with a field hospital on board, with a capacity that could be increased to up to 300 beds. The vessel arrived at the port of São Sebastião on 23 February, also carrying 28 medics of several specialties including surgeons, dentists and orthopedists, as well as 180 marines who were designated to operate heavy machinery in aid of the search and rescue efforts.

Brazilian Carnival festivities were cancelled in Bertioga, Ilhabela, São Sebastião, and Ubatuba.

== See also ==
- Weather in 2023
- Climate of Brazil
