= Itapororoca =

Coordinates: 6°51′S 35°15′W

- Municipality
- Flag Coat of arms
- Interactive map of Itapororoca
- Country: Brazil
- Region: South
- State: Paraíba
- Mesoregion: Mata Paraibana

Population (2020)
  - Total: 18,823
- Time zone: UTC−3 (BRT)

Itapororoca is a municipality in the state of Paraíba in the Northeast Region of Brazil. It is a constituent part of the Zona da Mata Paraibana mesoregion and belongs to the Litoral Norte economic–statistical microregion. Its population was 18,527 as of 2016. It covers an area of 146.067 km^{2}, with a population density of 106.2 inhabitants per km^{2}.

== See also ==
- List of municipalities in Paraíba
