= Toque Toque Grande and Toque Toque Pequeno =

Two beaches in São Paulo, Brazil

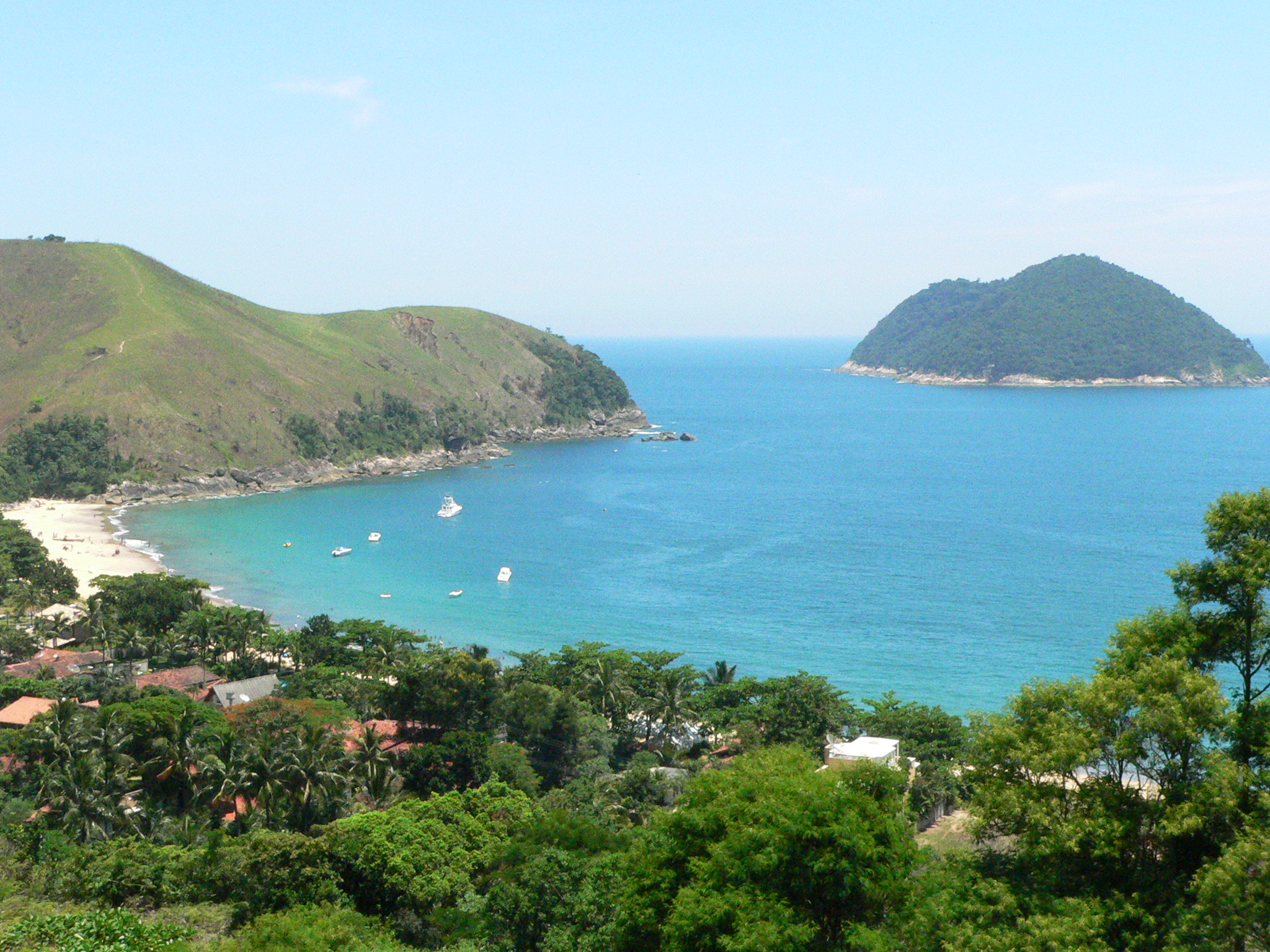
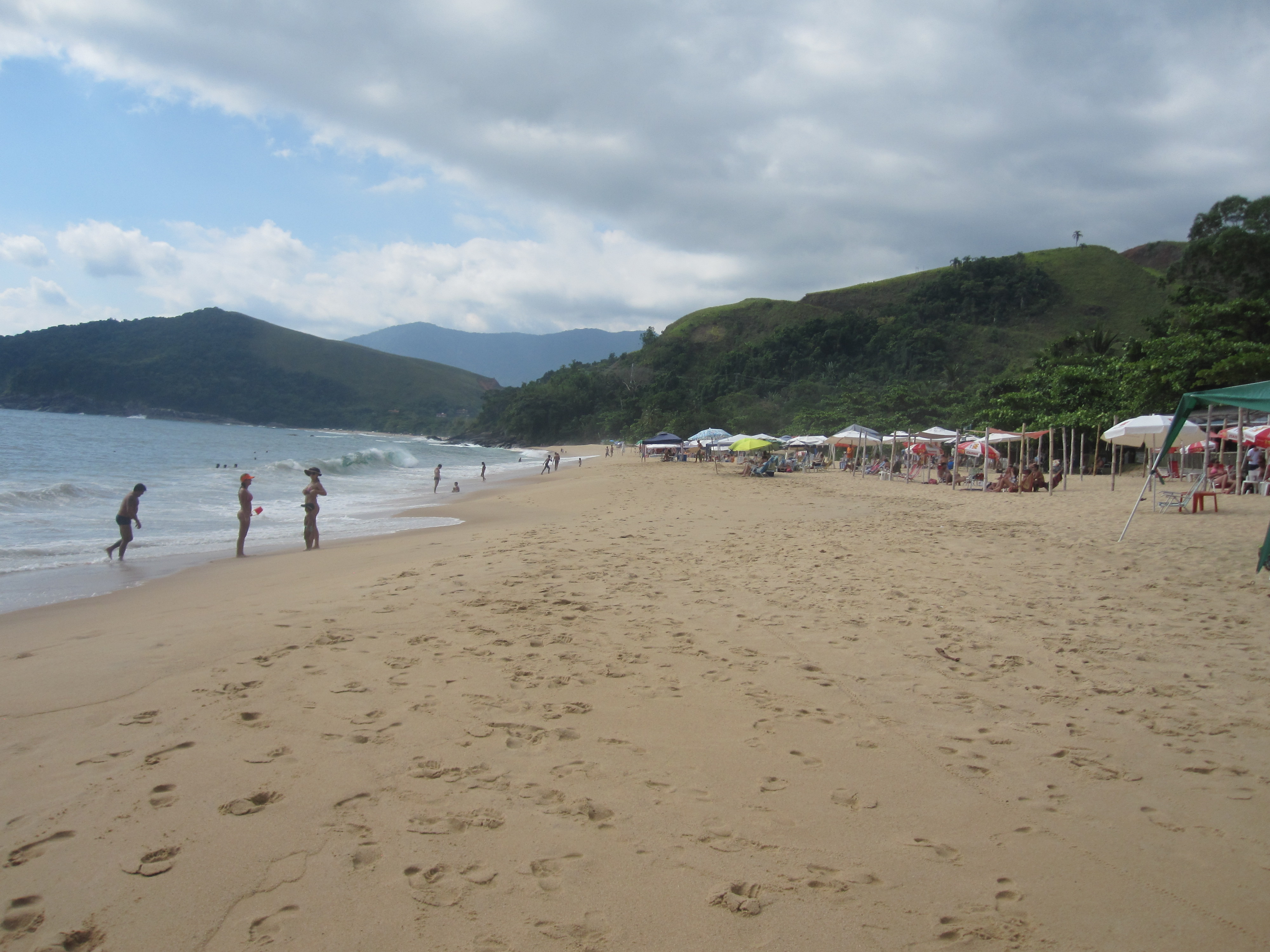
Toque-Toque Grande Beach and Toque-Toque Grande Island (left); Toque-Toque Pequeno Beach. (right)

Toque-Toque Grande and Toque-Toque Pequeno are two beaches at the Atlantic Ocean in the city of São Sebastião, state of São Paulo, Brazil. They are separated by another beach called "das Calhetas", being 2,4km away from each other.

== Toque-Toque Grande ==
Despite its name ("Grande" means big in Portuguese), the beach is only some 800m long, and is smaller than Toque-toque Pequeno Beach. Several mid-class houses surround the beach, while a couple of kiosks offer food and beverage for visitors. Most of them work only during summer, when the beach is visited by more people. At one and a half a kilometer far from the left (Southeast) edge of the beach, there's the Toque-Toque Grande Island (larger than the Toque-Toque Pequeno Island), uninhabited and with no beaches, but frequently visited for scuba diving.

The top of the hill at the left of the beach can be achieved by walking.

== Toque-Toque Pequeno ==
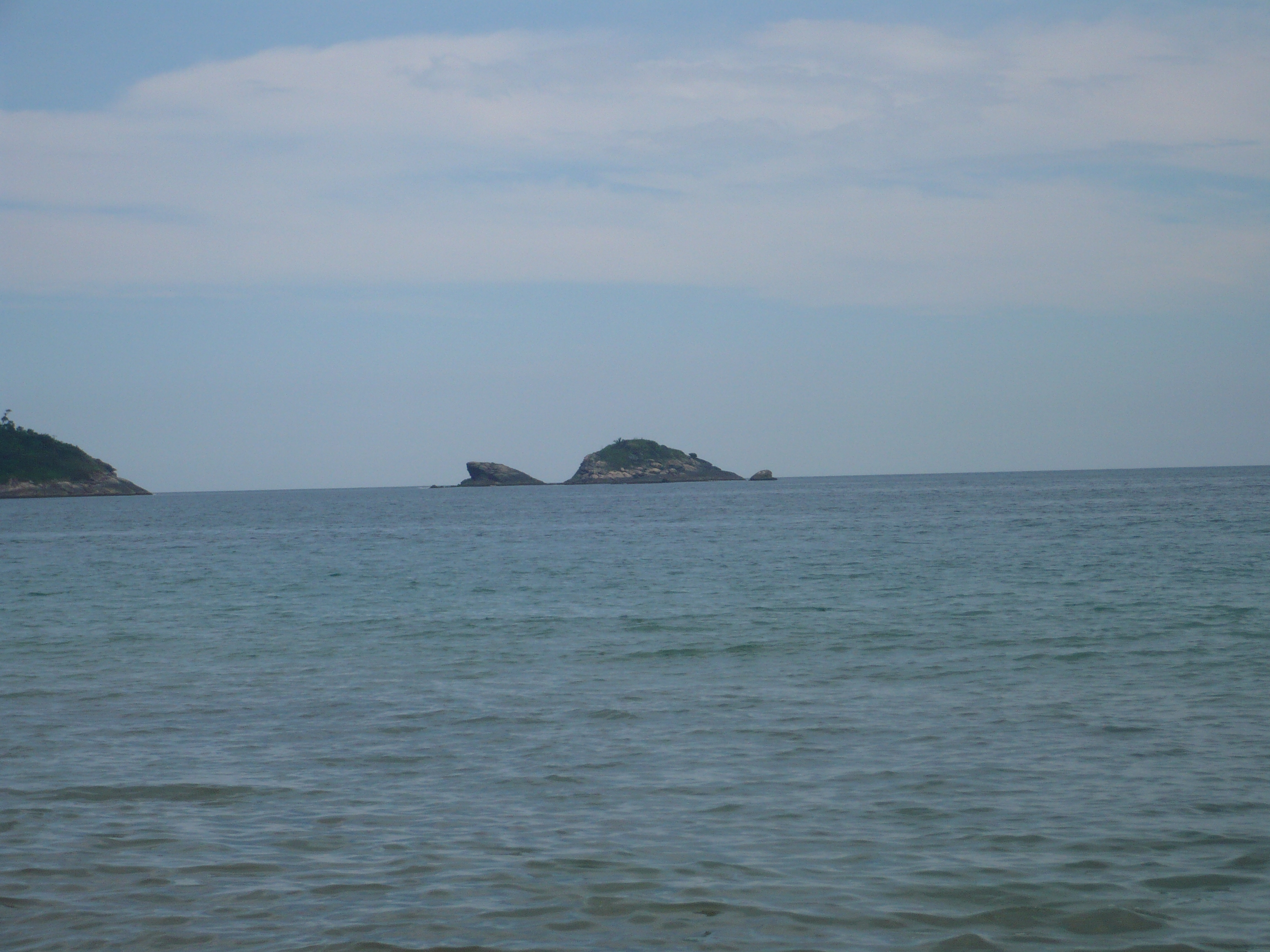
The turtle-shaped Toque-Toque Pequeno Island from Santiago Beach.

Toque-Toque Pequeno is the second beach after Toque Toque Grande, heading Northwest. It is longer than Toque-Toque Grande, and its landscape is much the same: mid-class houses between the beach and the highway, weak or moderate waves and restaurants. Just as Toque Toque Grande, it also has its own island, which is much smaller than the other's. The island resembles a turtle when seen from the continent.
