= Barequeçaba =

Beach in São Sebastião, Brazil

Coordinates: 23°49′40″S 45°26′08″W

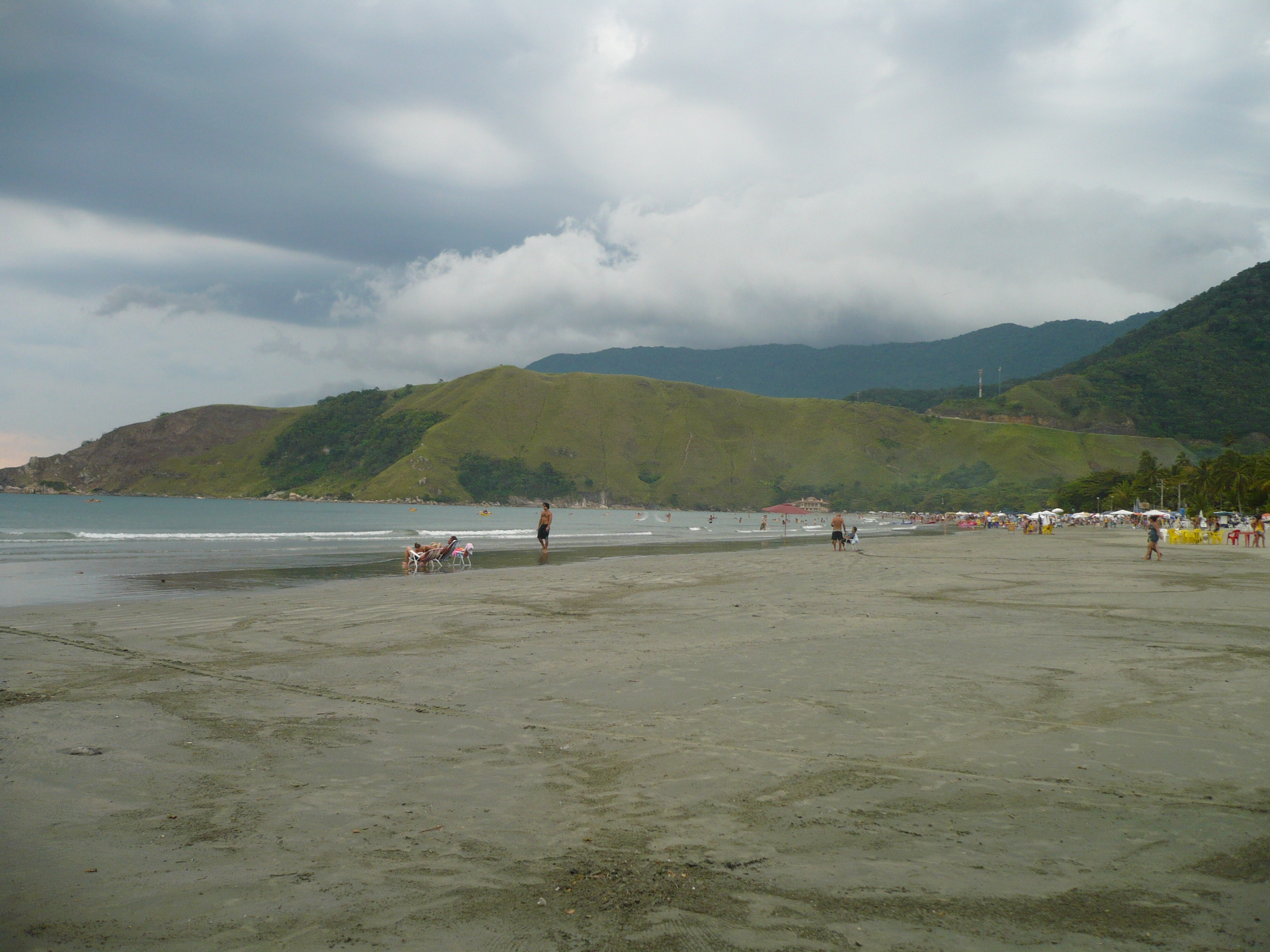
Barequeçaba beach from the west.

Barequeçaba (sometimes spelled Baraqueçaba) is a beach located 7 km south from the centre of the Brazilian city of São Sebastião, São Paulo, following the BR-101 highway (known as Rio-Santos) which is the main road going along the Brazilian coast from Rio de Janeiro to Santos.

The name of the beach comes from the Tupi language and means "Place of sleep of the priest" (abaré ("priest"), kera ("to sleep") and saba ("place").

Barequeçaba combines both a permanent population, and a floating tourist population that increase during the summer. The permanent population, with a large percentage of retired and elderly people ensures a range of services available on the beach during all the year, like restaurants, stores and small marinas with boats to Ilhabela.

The depth of the water at Barequeçaba drops very slowly and the waves are most of the time very weak, which makes the beach very popular among bathers and families with little children. For this reason, the fire brigade (responsible in Brazil for life guarding) has consistently assigned one staff member to guard the beach, even though other beaches have more than 10 life guards assigned.
