= Juqueí =

Beach in São Sebastião, São Paulo, Brazil

Coordinates: 23°46′00″S 45°44′00″W

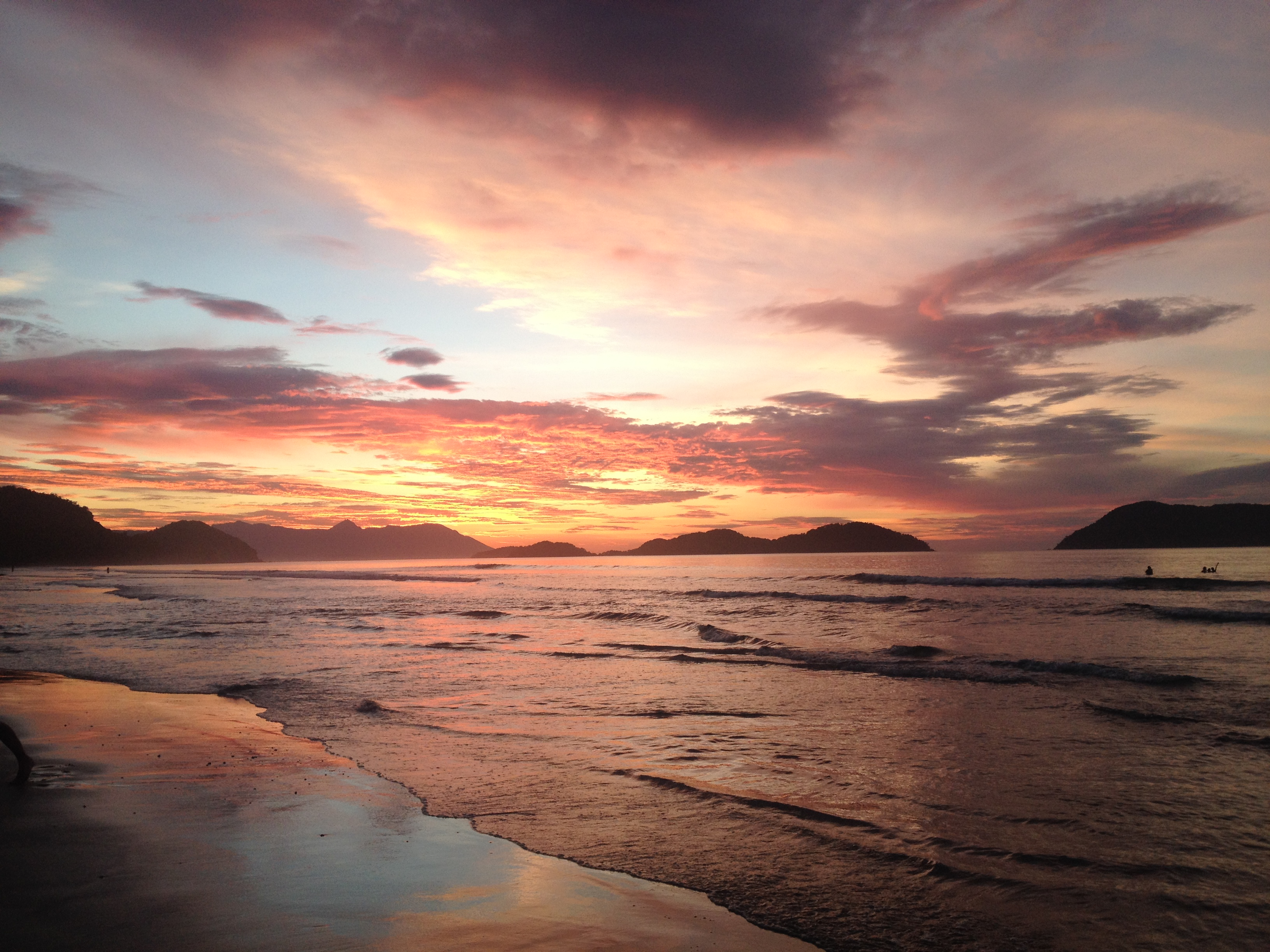
Sunrise in Juqueí

Juqueí (archaic spelling Juquehy) is a popular beach in the city of São Sebastião, São Paulo, located in the northern coastline of São Paulo state in Brazil. It is neighboring the beaches of Barra do Una and Preta Beach and just over 10 km from Camburi Beach. The beach is approximately 3.5 km long, with fine white sand and transparent water. It has many hotels, inns, bars, beach kiosks, and street vendors, as well as grocery stores, pharmacies, and bakeries in the neighborhood. To the right corner are good waves, while the left corner is suitable for bathing and families with children. Besides its natural attractions, Juquehy is also known for its traditional cuisine, such as "Pescado a Cambucu", which is a type of hake.
