= Microregion of Caraguatatuba =

Coordinates: 23°37′12″S 45°24′46″W

- Microregion
- Location of Microregion of Caraguatatuba in the state of São Paulo
- Country: Brazil
- Region: Southeast
- State: São Paulo
- Mesoregion: Vale do Paraíba Paulista

Area
  - Total: 1,947.7 km^{2} (752.0 sq mi)

Population (2010 Census)
  - Total: 281,532
  - Density: 144.55/km^{2} (374.37/sq mi)
- Time zone: UTC-3 (UTC-3)

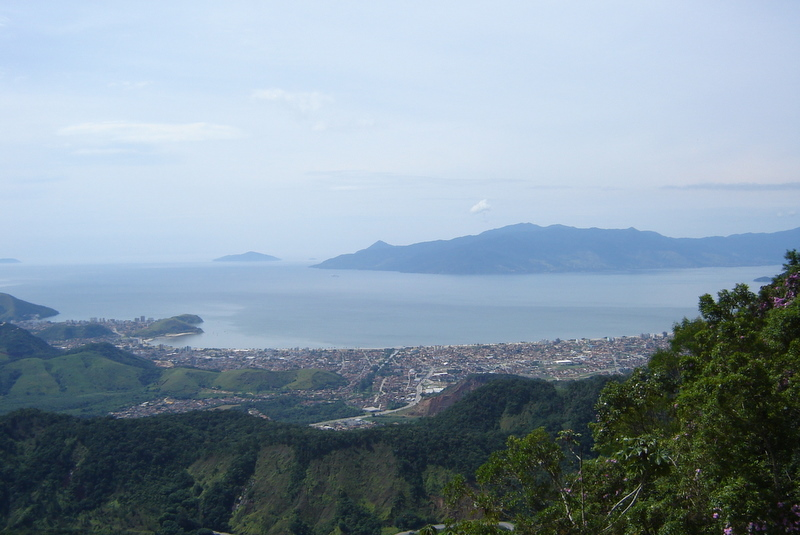
Caraguatatuba (foreground) and the northern half of Ilhabela (background): two cities of Litoral Norte

The Microregion of Caraguatatuba (Portuguese: Microrregião de Caraguatatuba), often referred to as Litoral Norte (Northern Coastline), is a microregion in the easternmost coastal part of São Paulo State, Brazil. The microregion is bordered by the state of Rio de Janeiro to the east. It is a famous touristic destination, mainly because of the 160 beaches. According to IBGE, Caraguatatuba Microregion has a GDP of R$2,019,94,.048,00 and a population of 281,532 people spread over an area of 1,947.702 km², which means that the density is 144.5/km². The population increases considerably during the summer, because of the tourists.

== Municipalities ==
The microregion consists of the following municipalities:

- Caraguatatuba
- Ilhabela
- São Sebastião
- Ubatuba

== History ==
The first city to be settled was São Sebastião, in 1636. Ubatuba came next, in 1637, and then Ilhabela in 1805. Caraguatatuba was the last one, in 1857. However, the channel between Ilhabela and São Sebastião had already been sailed by the Portuguese in 1502.

All four cities relied on agriculture and fishing as their main economic activities for most of the 17th, 18th and 19th centuries, whereas São Sebastião served as a major sugar cane, coffea and tobacco production site. In the second half of the 20th century, the cities started to receive several tourists, mostly from São Paulo and nearby cities. This made it possible for the region to make money out of tourism, via hotels, restaurants, handicraft stores and nightclubs.

== Geography ==
The Serra do Mar mountain range dominates the landscape of the microregion. Urbanization took place in the plains between the mountains and the sea. The highest point is the Pico de São Sebastião (Saint Sebastian's Peak), in Ilhabela, at 1,378 metres (4,521 ft) above sea level. The oceanic climate sets the temperatures around the region between 20 and 30 °C for most of the year. Rain falls moderately, but it falls more frequently particularly in Ubatuba, which is the reason for the city's nickname Ubachuva (lit. Ubarain).

== Transportation ==
=== Highways ===
The only road crossing all the microregion (except for the island municipality of Ilhabela) is the BR-101, which runs near the sea and serves as the main connection between the cities. São Sebastião is the only city not to have a connection to the countryside. Caraguatatuba is connected to São José dos Campos via the Tamoios Highway. From Ubatuba, it is possible to reach Taubaté via the Oswaldo Cruz Highway.

To reach Ilhabela, the island is only accessible via the ferry boats departing from São Sebastião. The crossing takes 15 minutes, although sometimes people must wait more than an hour to take the boat.

=== Air ===
Ubatuba Airport is the only one in the microregion. It operates from sunrise to sunset only, and it is used mainly for non-commercial flights. It has a single 930 m asphalt 09/27 runway.
