= São Sebastião, São Paulo =

São Sebastião
- Municipality
- Municipality of São Sebastião
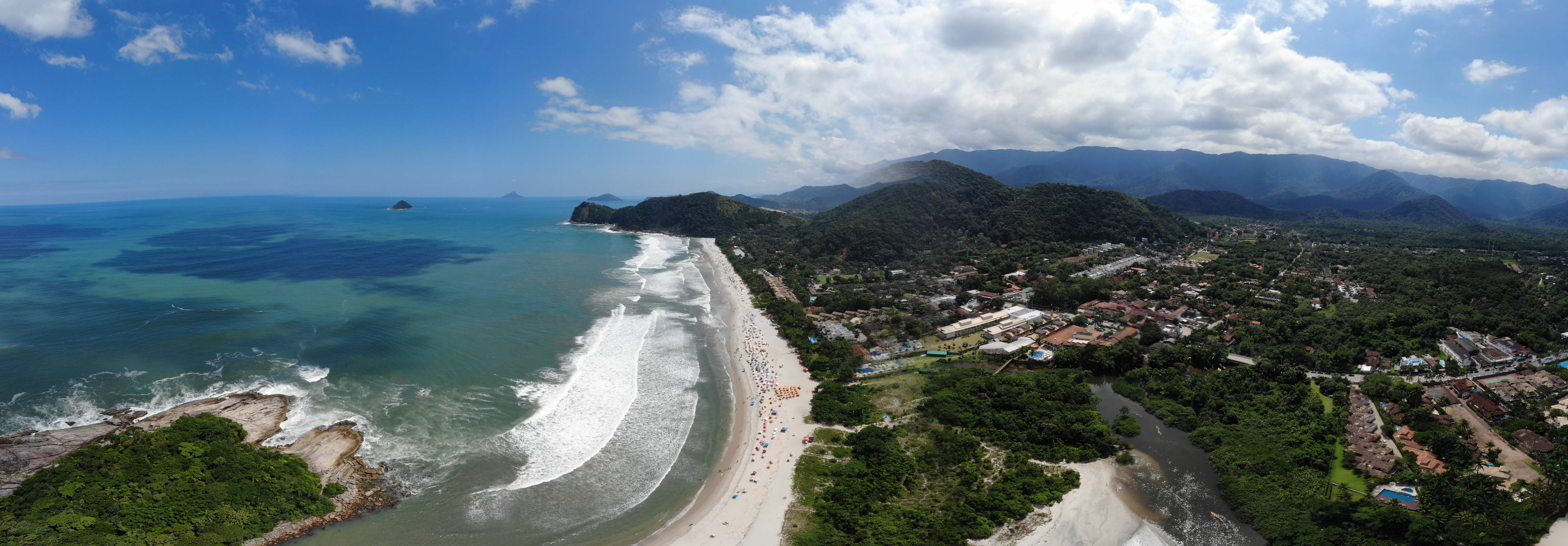
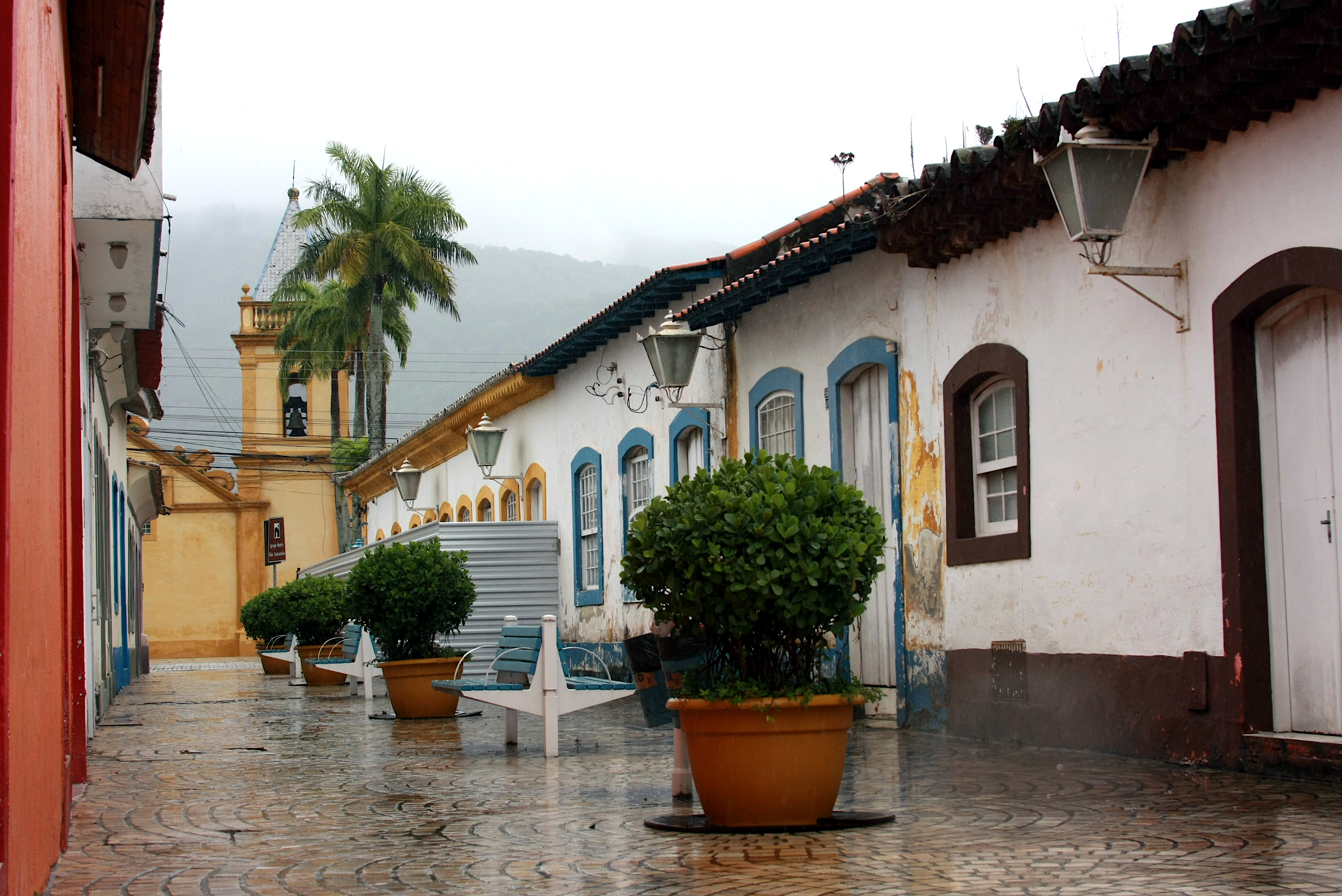
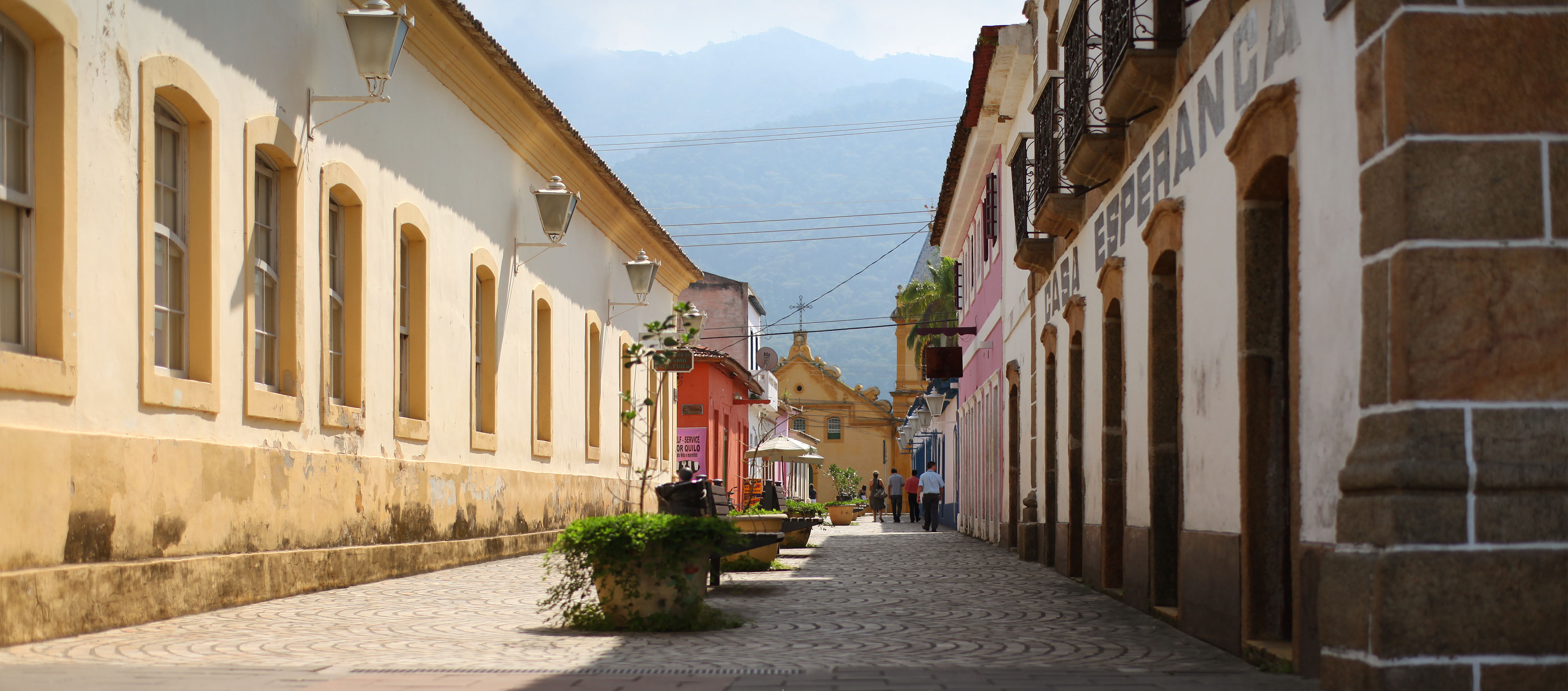
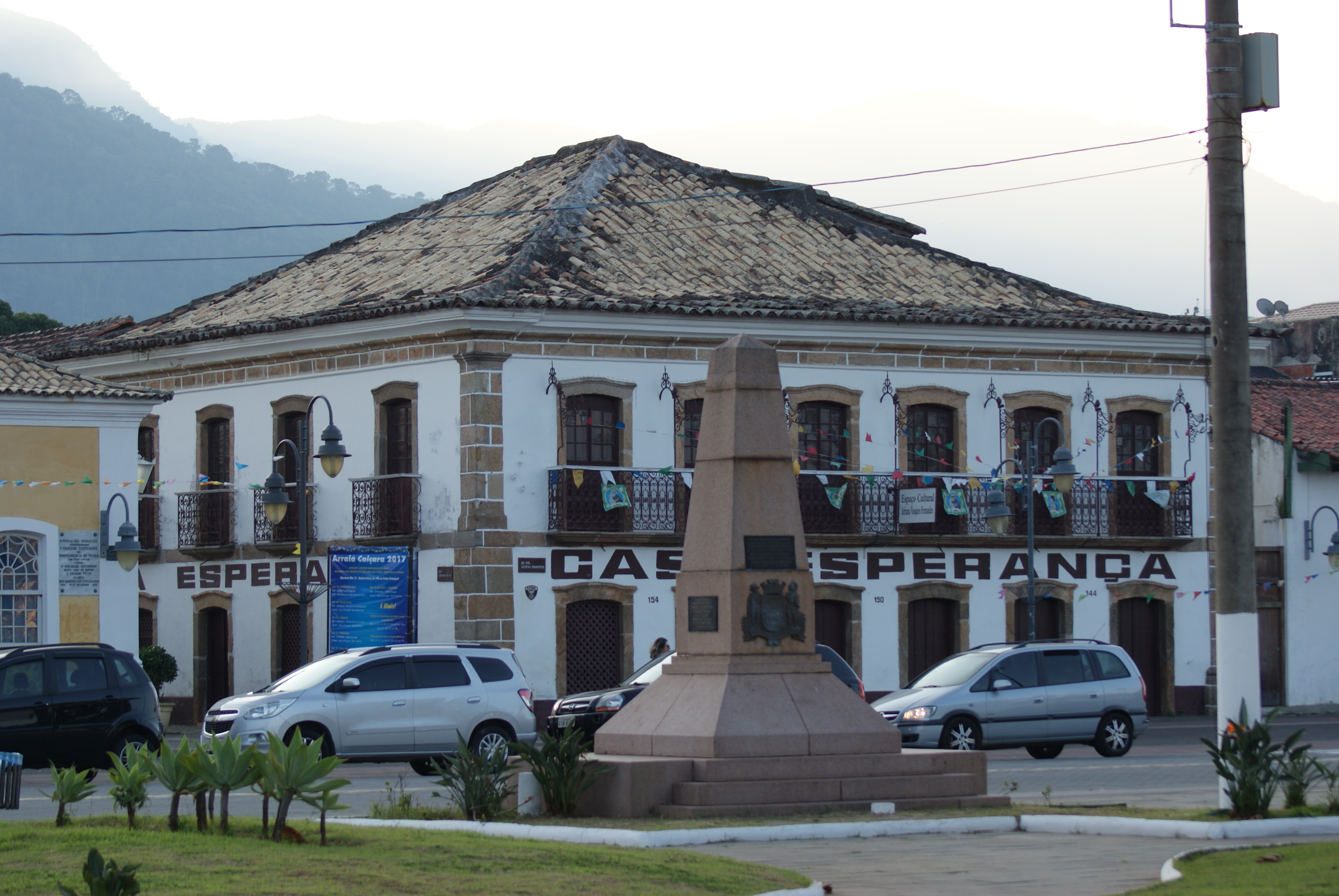
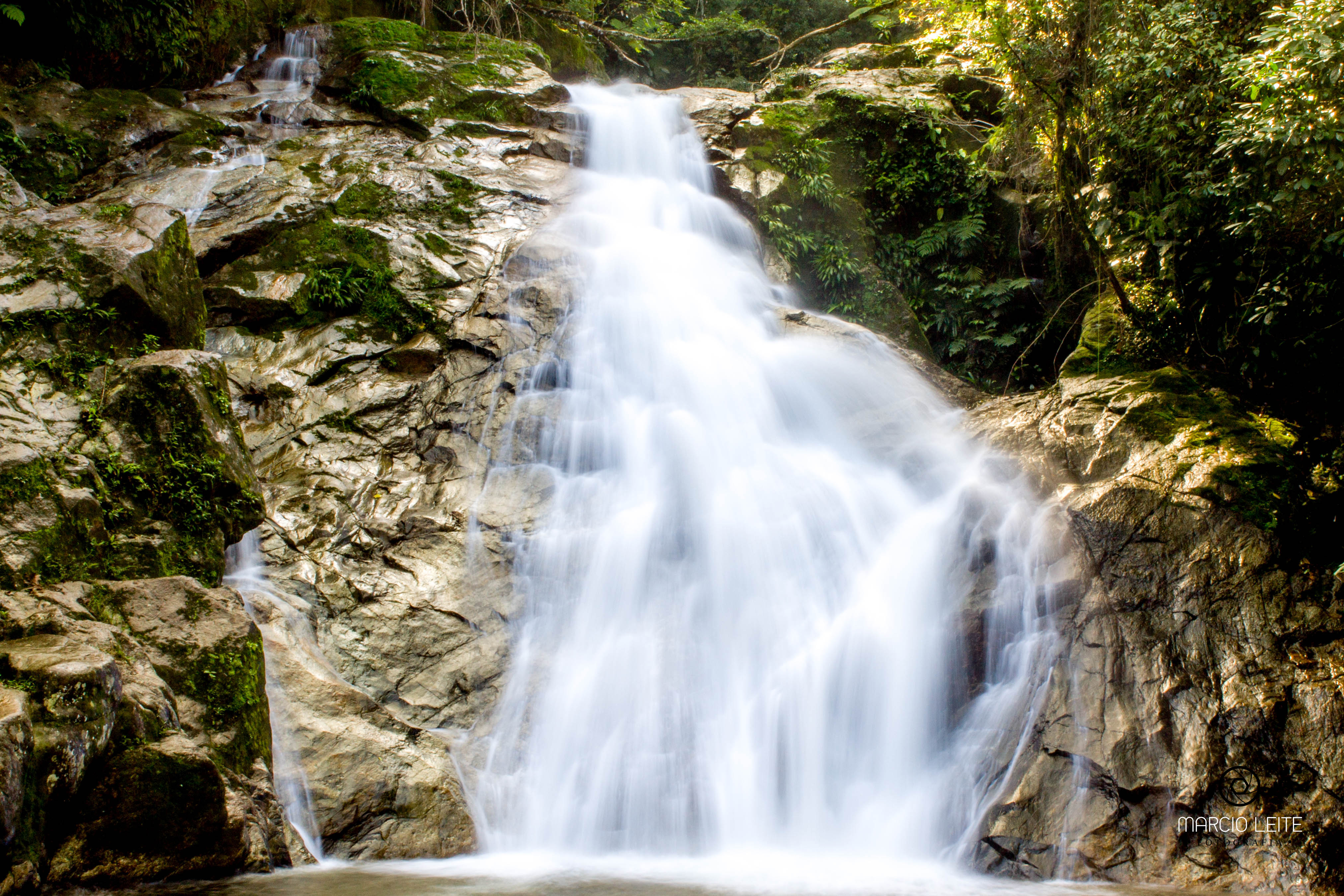
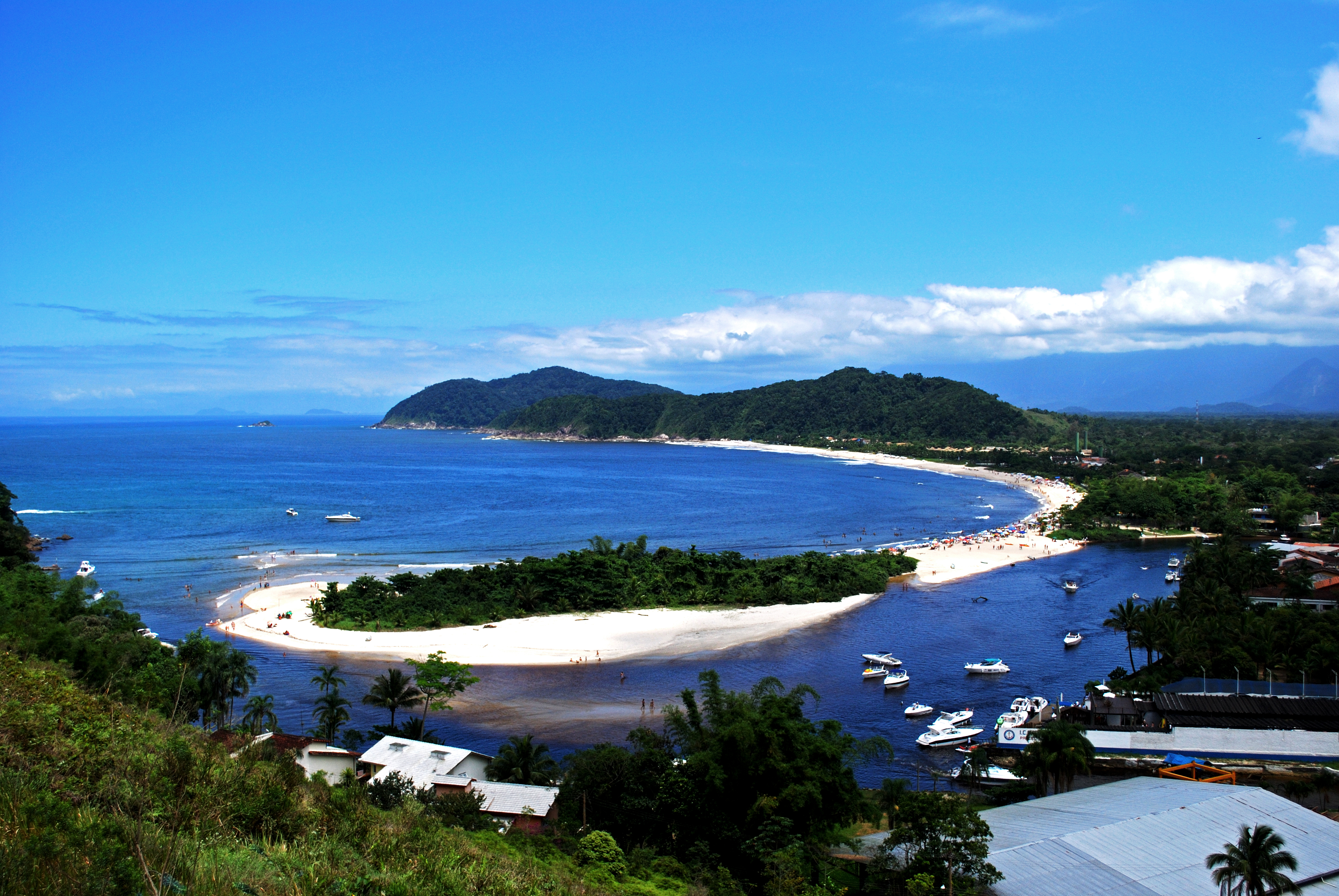
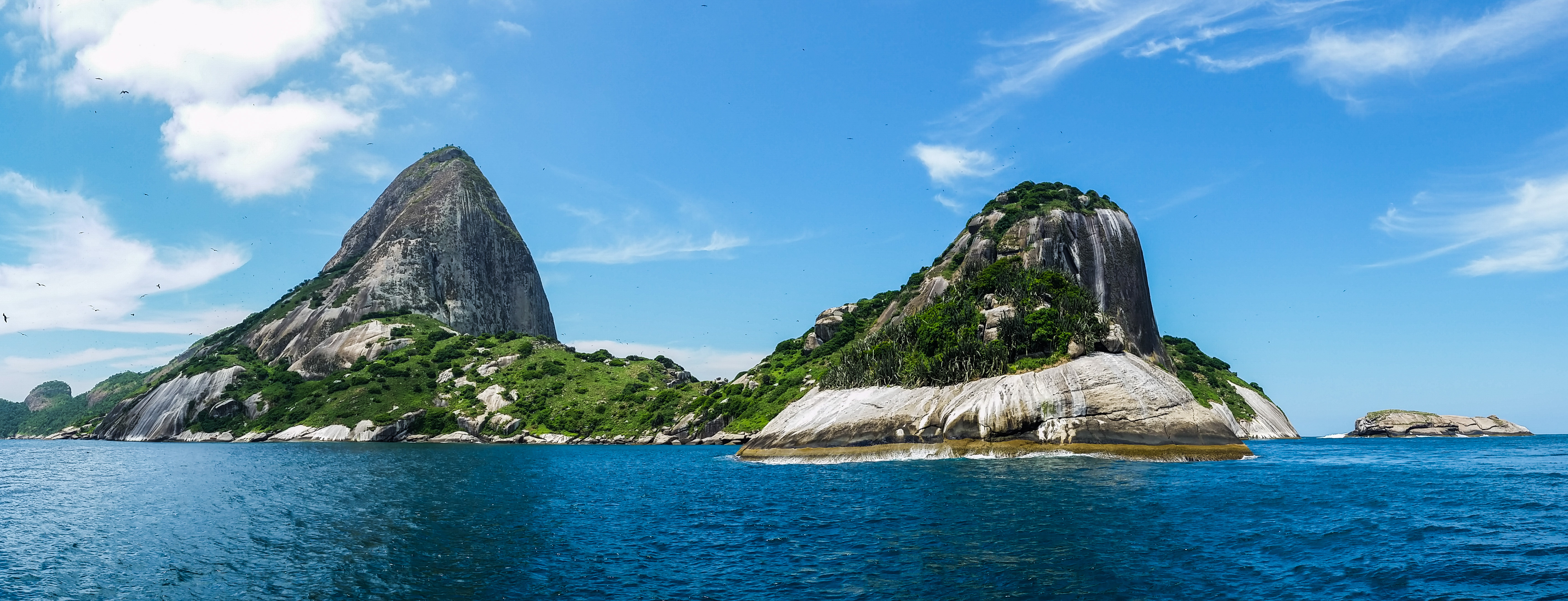
- Panoramic view of Camburi Beach Historic Center Rua da Praia Hope House Samambaiaçu Waterfall Barra do Una Alcatrazes Islands

- Flag Coat of arms
- Motto: Pavlistarvm Vigilarivs
- Location in the state of São Paulo and Brazil
- Coordinates: 23.807837°S 45.402709°W
- Country: Brazil
- Region: Southeast
- State: São Paulo
- Metropolitan Region: Vale do Paraíba e Litoral Norte
- Settled: March 16, 1636

Government
  - Mayor: Felipe Augusto (PSDB)

Area
  - Municipality: 403.336 km^{2} (155.729 sq mi)
  - Metro: 2,373 km^{2} (916 sq mi)

Population (2020)
  - Municipality: 90,328
  - Density: 223.95/km^{2} (580.03/sq mi)
- Time zone: UTC−3 (BRT)
- HDI (2010): 0.772 – high
- Website: www.saosebastiao.sp.gov.br

São Sebastião (Portuguese for Saint Sebastian) is a Brazilian municipality, located on the southeast coast of Brazil, in the state of São Paulo. The population in 2020 was 90,328, its density was 185/km^{2} and the area is 403 km^{2}. The Tropic of Capricorn lies 25 km north. The municipality existed since 1636 and formed a part of the old hereditary captaincy of Santo Amaro.

The archipelago municipality of Ilhabela is located on the east coast of the city; the largest island of the archipelago is also called São Sebastião. Between the city and the island, there is the São Sebastião channel with 30 kilometres in length, and variable width (2 km being the shortest crossing). There is an oil terminal at the channel, owned by Transpetro, a subsidiary of Petrobrás.

The city is famous for its beaches, which makes it a popular tourism destination, especially for people from the state of São Paulo. Near the boundary with Bertioga, there is a small Guarani village managed by FUNAI. In 2024, it was elected by Time Out magazine as the third most underrated travel destination in the world.

== History ==
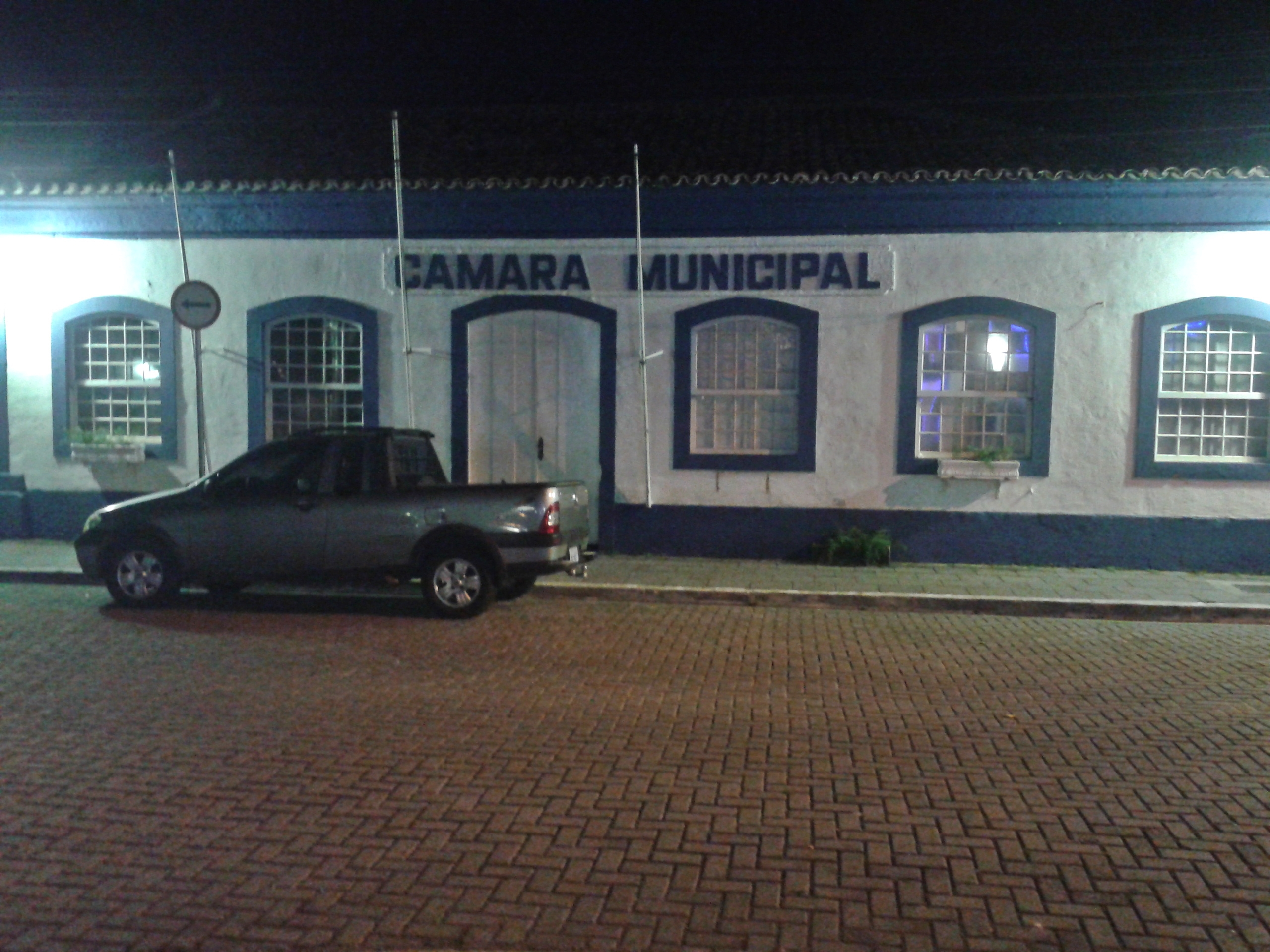
São Sebastião City Council

Before the Portuguese first arrived, the area was inhabited by the Tupinambás to the north and the Tupiniquins to the south. Both tribes were separated by the Serra de Boiçucanga (Boiçucanga Mountain range), located 30 km south of the city centre. Both tribes disliked each other. When the French arrived in Brazil via the Guanabara Bay and confronted the Portuguese, the Tupiniquins united with the Portuguese and the Tupinambás, with the French. This battle between them was witnessed and recounted by Hans Staden.

The municipality was named after Saint Sebastian in honor of the day that the Américo Vespúcio expedition sailed through the channel between the city and Ilhabela – January 20, 1502.

The first Portuguese to settle there were Diogo de Unhate, Diogo Dias, João de Abreu, Gonçalo Pedroso and Francisco de Escobar Ortiz, just after the subdivision of Brazil into capitanias hereditárias. São Sebastião was part of the Captaincy of Santo Amaro. The area was first developed as an agriculture and fishing village. The agricultural activities transformed the village into a major sugar cane producer, which later helped the hamlet to earn its village status on March 16, 1636. To gain this status, though, the village had to build a church in honour of Saint Sebastian.

A few years after this, another hamlet developed just north of São Sebastião: São Francisco da Praia (Saint Francis of the Beach). In 1840, the hamlet took the first step to become independent: they asked it to become a freguesia. The request was eventually accepted in the same year, but the freguesia was disestablished in 1859 and re-joined to São Sebastião.

The city kept on basing its economy on the production of sugar cane, coffee, tobacco and fishing. The local port was widely used to load ships with gold from Minas Gerais during the 17th and 18th centuries. It was also used by pirates and smugglers.

When slavery was abolished, in 1888, and the railway linking São Paulo to the bigger Port of Santos was opened, the city's economy entered a period of crisis, and the population decreased. From that moment on, the city began to rely on subsistence agriculture and "handicraft fishing" (Pesca Artesanal), a type of fishing done entirely by hand from the fishing to consumption (in other words, no machinery is used, and most of the people who practice it do it for subsistence as well).

Until the 1960s, nothing much changed. However, in that decade, Petrobras built its oil terminal, attracting new employees and investments. The population growth of the city grew wider and faster. While the city centre kept developing, workers migrating from other parts of Brazil built their houses near the Serra do Mar, establishing the neighborhood of Topolândia, which now is home to the lower-class families.

São Sebastião became a tourist destination in the late 1980s, when the Rodovia Rio-Santos (a section of the BR-101 that connects Santos to Rio de Janeiro) was completed. Most of the lands were sold to countryside or paulistanas families who wished a house to spend the weekends and holidays on the coast. Most of the caiçaras (people who make a living out of fishing) started to work with tourism, even though a few of them still earn money from fishing.

Until now, tourism plays an important role in the city's economy. However, as the city grew, proper water and sewage pipes have not been built for every building, which led to the lack of proper urban infrastructure in certain parts of the city. As of November 2010, less than 50% of the city's sewage received proper treatment. However, after a project by the government of the state of São Paulo called "Onda Limpa" (Clean Wave), the percentage of houses connected to sewage pipes went up to 94% as of January 2012.

In addition, illegal housing became a major problem, as more houses are built in Mata Atlântica zones which, as well as being subject to preservation restrictions, are highly likely to suffer from mudslides. There are an estimated 11,045 houses built in "frozen" areas, that is, areas in which new houses are not allowed to be built. The number of new buildings in the region grows 20% every year.

Another current threat to the city is the sea level rise, which may affect several beaches and buildings located close to the shore.

In March 2012, the deputy mayor of São Sebastião, Wagner Teixeira (PV) was caught doing illegal fishing off the coast of the city, near Paredão Island, Alcatrezes Archipelago. He was on his private boat with five other men, and didn't stop until his engine ran out of gas, even with the coast guard on his tail with sirens on. He was carrying 116 kg of fish, including endangered species, and stated he wasn't aware of the prohibition of fishing in that area.

The Port of São Sebastião will receive considerable investment in the next decade so that it increases its operation capacity in a long-term expansion project due to continue until 2035. The number of employees at the port is expected to jump from the current 450 to 4500, 2/3 of them being required to hire local residents. Another improvement expected for the next years (tentatively 2016) involves doubling the lanes of Tamoios Highway, which connects São José dos Campos and the neighboring city of Caraguatatuba and is the main route to the city for people coming from São Paulo and many other cities.

== Geography ==
Virtually everything in the city is located on the narrow plains between the Atlantic Ocean and the mountains, except for some cell phone towers and transmission towers. In the central portion of the city, these plains are never wider than 3 km, although they may measure up to 6 km in the less developed areas to the west. Most of the city concentrates between the Enseada Beach (the last beach before Caraguatatuba) and the Guaecá Beach. From Toque Toque Grande beach to Boracéia Beach (the last beach before Bertioga), hotels, summer houses and nightclubs dominate the terrain. The Guaratuba River marks the border with Bertioga, while the Juqueriquerê River marks the border with Caraguatatuba.

The city has an oceanic climate, with an annual average temperature of 24 °C. Most of the mountainous terrain and the islands are covered by the Atlantic Forest.

Two districts make up the municipality: São Sebastião District (Distrito de São Sebastião) and Maresias District (Distrito de Maresias).

=== Islands and islets ===
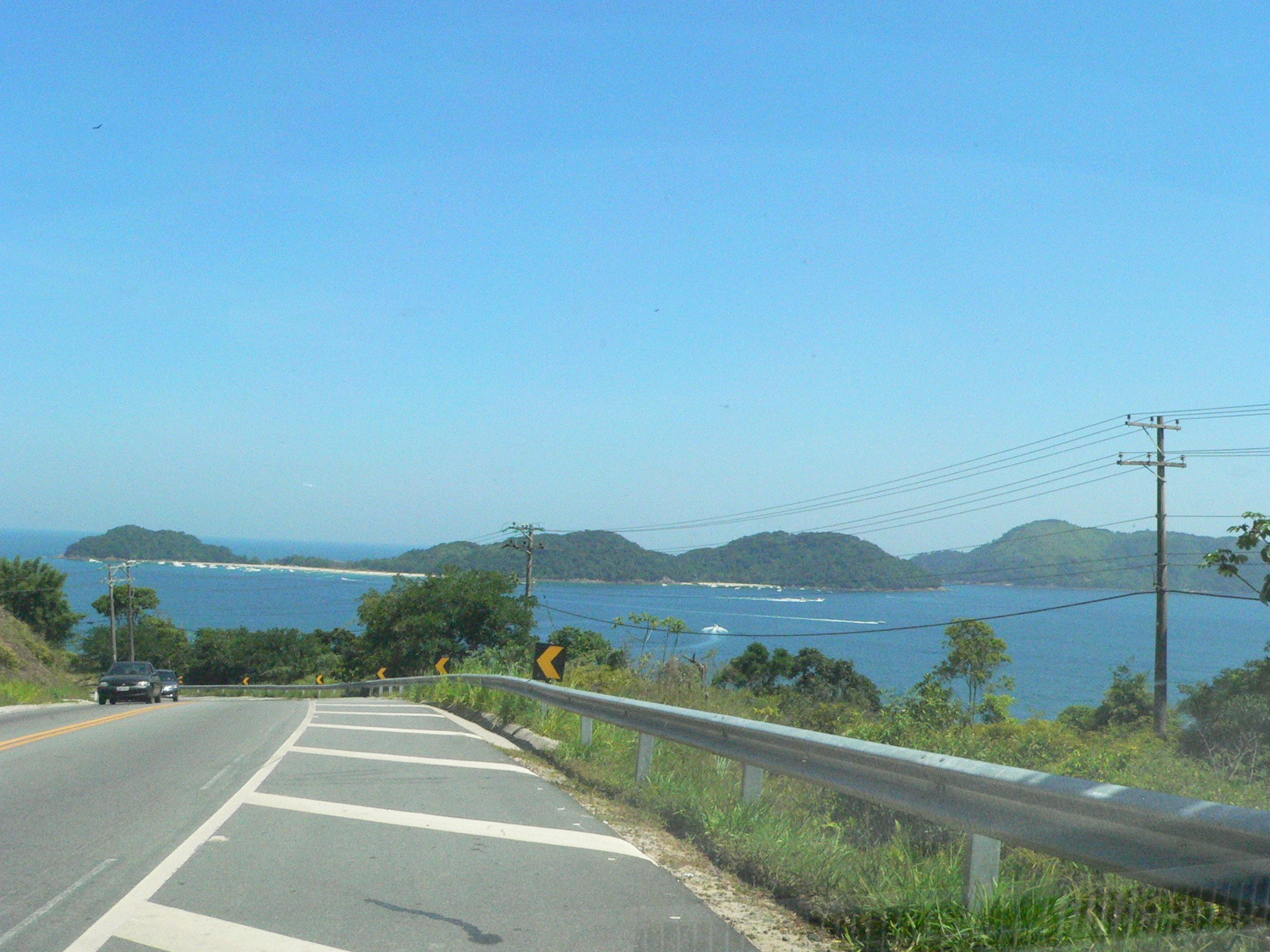
Two of São Sebastião's islands seen from the BR-101. As Ilhas are in the middle, and the Ilha das Couves can be seen to the right, right behind As Ilhas.

There are a number of islands and islets spread along the city's coastline, all of them created by ancient volcanic activities. The largest and most famous is the Ilha de São Sebastião (São Sebastião Island), which is part of the municipality of Ilhabela.

==== Toque-Toque Islands ====
Viewed from north to south, the Toque-Toque Grande island comes first after Ilhabela, and is located in front of the beach of the same name. There are neither beaches nor people there, but it is popular for scuba diving. The nearby Toque-Toque Pequeno Island is smaller, and resembles a sea turtle when seen from the Santiago Beach.

==== Gatos Island ====
The Ilha dos Gatos (Island of the Cats, located 1.8 km (1.1 mi) from Ponta da Baleia (Whale Point), a hill between Camburi Beach and da Baleia Beach), is an island open to the public. It is said that it was once owned by a member of the Rockefeller family, and that the ruins on top of its hills are from a mansion Rockefeller himself tried to have built, but that was prohibited by the Brazilian government. It is adequate for freediving. The waters surrounding Gatos Island are full of snooks, and they are also frequently visited by whales during the winter.

==== Alcatrazes Islands ====
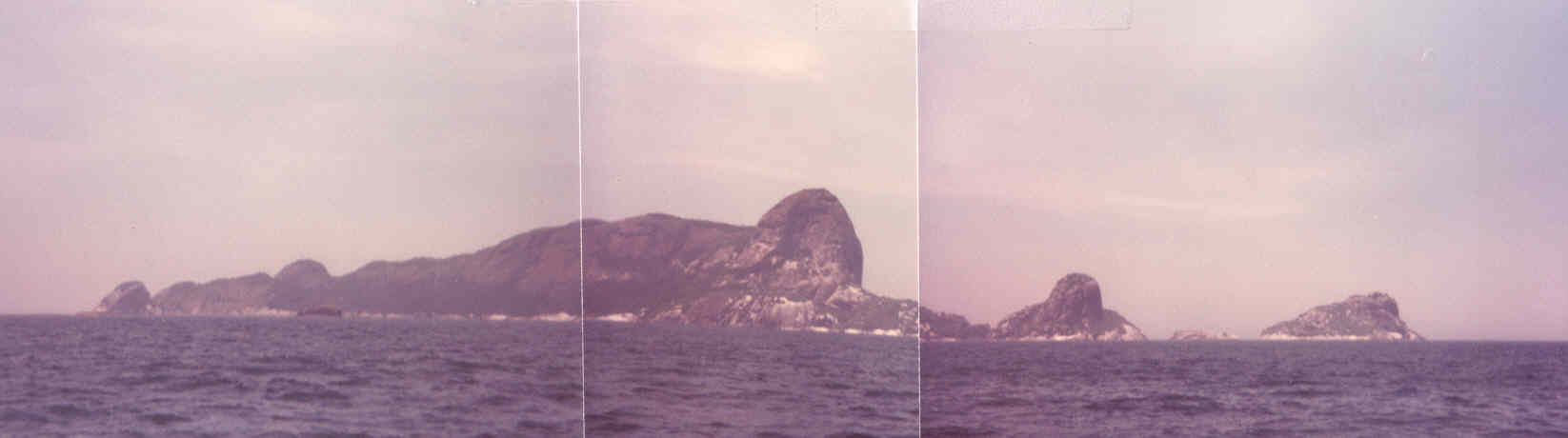
Alcatrazes Island.

The Alcatrazes Archipelago is formed by five bigger islands (Alcatrazes Island, Sapata Island, Paredão Island, Porto Island (aka Farol Island) and Southern island), and some smaller unnamed islands. It is the farthest island of São Sebastião, being some 30 km (18.6 mi) away from the southern tip of Ilhabela and 35 km (21.7 mi) from the nearest continental beach, Boiçucanga. Several birds, whales and other sea animals stop there seasonally to reproduce. The main island was once used by the Brazilian Navy as a howitzer shooting exercise range. As the shots were harming the environment of the island (either because of the noise or because of damage), the Brazilian Navy abandoned this practice. However, the island is still ruled by the military, who forbid fishing, diving and visiting on the island, except for researchers. The islands are within the Tupinambás Ecological Station.

Two species of frogs (Cycloramphus faustoi and Ololygon alcatraz) and a pitviper species (Bothrops alcatraz) are only found on the Alcatrazes Island.

==== As Ilhas ====
Despite its name (which means The Islands), As Ilhas are actually formed by only one island. It differs from other islands because there is a beach that is frequently visited by tourists from the nearby Barra do Saí and Juqueí beaches, both located around 2.4 km (1.5 mi) from the island.

==== Couves Island ====
Ilha das Couves (Cabbage Island, located 2.4 km (1.5 mi) from the coast and mere 600 m (1,920 ft) south of As Ilhas) is accessible from Barra do Sahy, via boats that are run by a fisherman's cooperative. Local grassroots efforts are underway to create an ecotourism educational center focusing on sustainable living. It also has some ruins on top of it: a small hotel was started in 2008 but was also prohibited by the Brazilian Navy.

==== Montão de Trigo Island ====
The Ilha Montão de Trigo lies 10 km (8.7 mi) south of the nearest beach (Barra do Una). Unlike the other islands of São Sebastião, it is permanently inhabited. Some 52 caiçaras live there, and were granted official permission to occupy and explore the island in 2012.

==== Unnamed islet in front of Juqueí ====
There is a small unnamed skerry in front of the Juqueí beach. It is part of the annual Volta do Parcel, an open water swimming competition which starts at the beach, takes the athletes around the islet and finishes back at Juqueí.

==== Ilha do Maracujá ====
The Ilha do Maracujá (Passion Fruit Island) is a small islet located in front of the wild beach of Brava, between Juréia and Boracéia. It is frequented by surfers.

== Climate ==
Climate data for São Sebastião, São Paulo (2007–2019 normals, extremes 2006–2017)
Month	Jan	Feb	Mar	Apr	May	Jun	Jul	Aug	Sep	Oct	Nov	Dec	Year
Record high °C (°F)	40.0 (104.0)	37.9 (100.2)	38.5 (101.3)	37.3 (99.1)	37.1 (98.8)	34.3 (93.7)	36.2 (97.2)	37.1 (98.8)	40.7 (105.3)	37.0 (98.6)	40.6 (105.1)	38.0 (100.4)	40.7 (105.3)
Mean daily maximum °C (°F)	30.2 (86.4)	29.6 (85.3)	30.3 (86.5)	28.7 (83.7)	26.5 (79.7)	24.6 (76.3)	24.4 (75.9)	24.6 (76.3)	25.3 (77.5)	26.5 (79.7)	27.5 (81.5)	29.8 (85.6)	27.3 (81.2)
Daily mean °C (°F)	25.7 (78.3)	24.9 (76.8)	25.6 (78.1)	23.9 (75.0)	21.4 (70.5)	19.7 (67.5)	19.3 (66.7)	19.7 (67.5)	20.9 (69.6)	22.4 (72.3)	23.3 (73.9)	25.2 (77.4)	22.7 (72.8)
Mean daily minimum °C (°F)	21.1 (70.0)	20.2 (68.4)	20.9 (69.6)	19.2 (66.6)	16.3 (61.3)	14.7 (58.5)	14.1 (57.4)	14.8 (58.6)	16.5 (61.7)	18.4 (65.1)	19.2 (66.6)	20.6 (69.1)	18.0 (64.4)
Record low °C (°F)	15.7 (60.3)	15.6 (60.1)	15.0 (59.0)	11.4 (52.5)	4.4 (39.9)	4.4 (39.9)	6.1 (43.0)	8.2 (46.8)	9.2 (48.6)	10.0 (50.0)	10.8 (51.4)	14.0 (57.2)	4.4 (39.9)
Average precipitation mm (inches)	281.4 (11.08)	197.4 (7.77)	263.1 (10.36)	218.4 (8.60)	174.1 (6.85)	164.4 (6.47)	137.9 (5.43)	126.4 (4.98)	130.4 (5.13)	188.3 (7.41)	205.3 (8.08)	222.9 (8.78)	2,310 (90.94)
Average precipitation days (≥ 1.0 mm)	18.7	12.3	16.6	12.7	13.7	11.7	10.2	12.7	14.5	16.5	16.2	14.8	170.6
Source: Centro Integrado de Informações Agrometeorológicas

== Demography ==
Historical population (municipality)
Year	Population	%±
1920	6,340
1940	6,036	−4.8%
1950	6,033	0.0%
1960	7,476	23.9%
1970	12,016	60.7%
1980	18,997	58.1%
1991	33,890	78.4%
2000	58,038	71.3%
2010	73,942	27.4%
2022	81,595	10.4%

== Economy ==
As of 2005, the city has a GDP of R$1,107,595,000.00 and a GDP per capita of R$15,138.

== Sites of interest ==
Apart from its 36 beaches (listed below), the city has a few places to visit, like the Igreja Matriz de São Sebastião, the Museu de Arte Sacra (Sacred Art Museum), the Convento da Nossa Senhora do Amparo and the Convento Franciscano. The city centre can be divided in two parts. One of them is located around the Igreja Matriz, and is filled with houses from the colonial period, most of them containing bars, hotels and restaurants. The other part is located near the sea and concentrates most of the nightlife. There are a number of bars and ice cream shops, a handicraft fair and a large recreational square, which includes the largest skatepark in Brazil, measuring 7,000 m^{2}.

=== Beaches ===
There are 37 beaches along the more than 100 km (63 mi) of coast of the city. From North to South, they are:

- Enseada
- Cigarras
- São Francisco da Praia
- Portal da Olaria
- Arrastão
- Pontal da Cruz
- Deserta
- do Porto Grande
- do Centro
- Preta
- Grande
- Pitangueiras
- do Timbó (access by foot only)
- do Cabelo Gordo (maintained by the University of São Paulo Center of Marine Biology)
- Barequeçaba
- Guaecá
- Brava
- Toque Toque Grande
- das Calhetas (access by foot only)
- Toque Toque Pequeno
- Santiago
- Paúba
- Maresias
- Brava
- Boiçucanga
- Camburizinho
- Camburi (or Cambury)
- da Baleia
- Barra do Saí (or do Sahy)
- Preta
- Conchas
- Juquehy (or Juqueí)
- Barra do Una
- do Engenho
- Juréia
- Brava
- Boracéia

== Media ==
In telecommunications, the city was served by Companhia de Telecomunicações do Estado de São Paulo until 1975, when it began to be served by Telecomunicações de São Paulo. In July 1998, this company was acquired by Telefónica, which adopted the Vivo brand in 2012.

The company is currently an operator of cell phones, fixed lines, internet (fiber optics/4G) and television (satellite and cable).

== Transportation ==
The only way to access the city is via the BR-101, called Avenue Dr. Manoel Hipólito do Rego in the central portion of the city and Prestes Maia Highway on the rest of the city. It is possible to come from Caraguatatuba to the north or Bertioga to the south. The highway is the most important road of the city, connecting it from north to south, and having a regular bus line running all through it. Bicycles are also widely used in the city.

== Notable people ==
- Diogo Silva - Taekwondo practitioner
- Gabriel Medina - Surfer

== Sister city ==
São Sebastião has one sister city designated by Sister Cities International:

- (United States) Fort Lauderdale, Florida

== See also ==
- 2023 São Paulo floods and landslides
- List of municipalities in São Paulo
