= Charnockite, St. Thomas Mount =

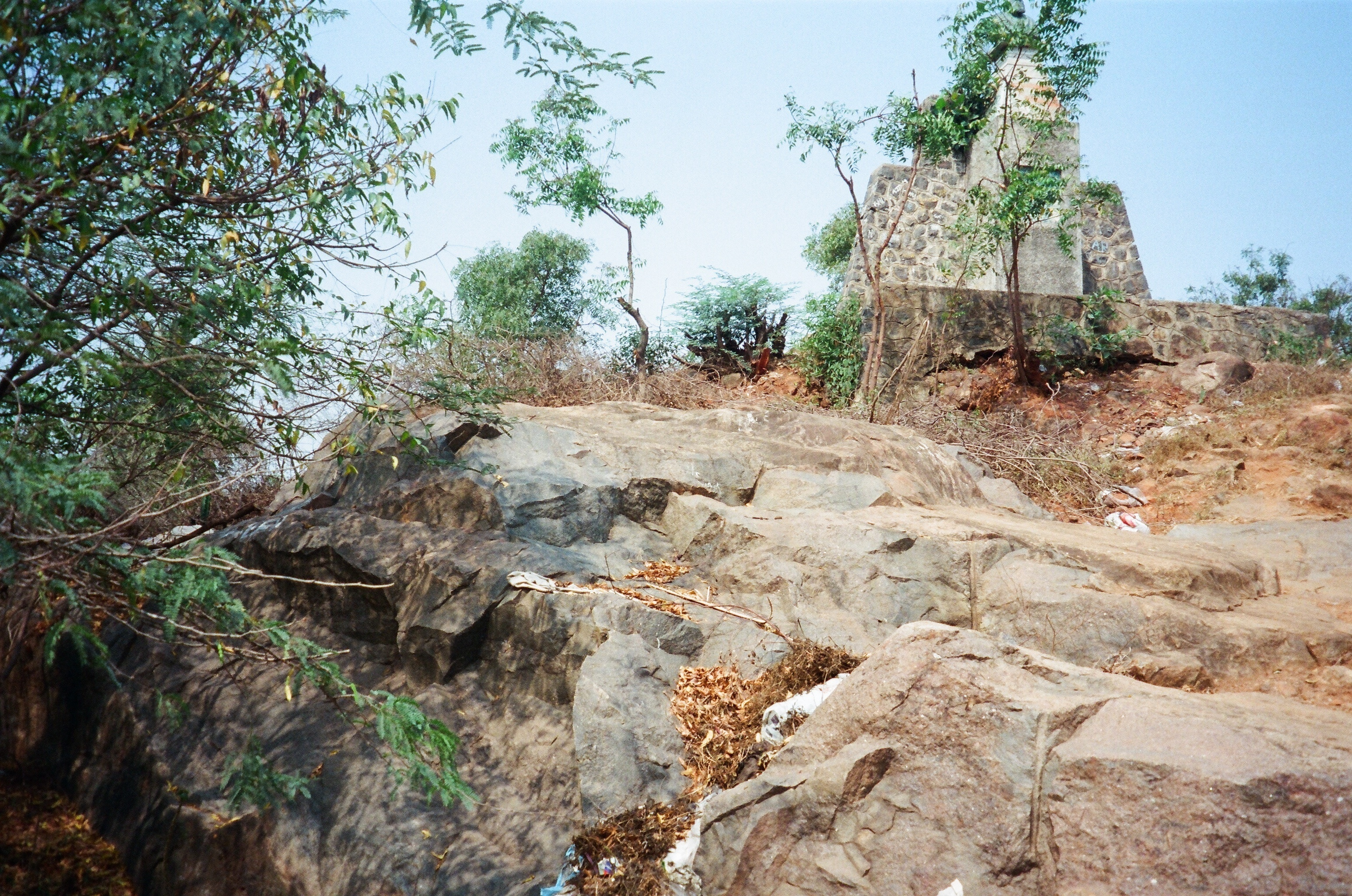
- Charnockite at St. Thomas Mount

- Location within Tamil Nadu
- Type: Geological formation
- Location: St. Thomas Mount, Chennai, India
- Coordinates: 12.99506°N 80.19955°E

National Geological Monuments of India
- Official name: St. Thomas Mount Charnockite
- Designated: 1975
- Designated by: Geological Survey of India

Charnockite from St. Thomas Mount is a characteristically profuse exposure of quartz–feldspar–hypersthene rock located in southern suburb of Chennai in the Indian state of Tamil Nadu. The name originated from the use of the rocks quarried from a central band in the St.Thomas Mount for the tombstone of Job Charnock in 1679. It was declared as a National Geological Monument by the Geological Survey of India in 1975.

== History ==
The geological formation is located atop St. Thomas Mount, a small hillock in the southern part of Chennai, Tamil Nadu. The hill itself is named after Thomas the Apostle, who died in 72 CE in the region.

The earliest recorded study of charnockite dates to 1892, when Thomas Oldham of the Geological Survey of India reported the occurrence of hypersthene granite in South India. In 1893, Thomas Henry Holland noted that these rocks in Madras were associated with large masses of norite and that the same type of stone had been used for the tombstone of Job Charnock, who died in 1679. The rock used for his tombstone is believed to have been quarried near St. Thomas Mount. Holland later published a paper titled "The Petrology of Job Charnock's Tombstone" and proposed the name "charnockite" for this new type of rock, in honour of Charnock. Later studies in 1950 suggested that the stone used for Charnock's tombstone was quarried from a central band of rock at St. Thomas Mount. It was declared as a National Geological Monument by the Geological Survey of India in 1975.

== Geology ==
Charnockite is an ancient formation similar to granite and is widely distributed across South India and extending into Sri Lanka. Some of these Charnockite formations occur as extensive plateaus, with elevations reaching about 6,000–7,000 ft (1,800–2,100 m).

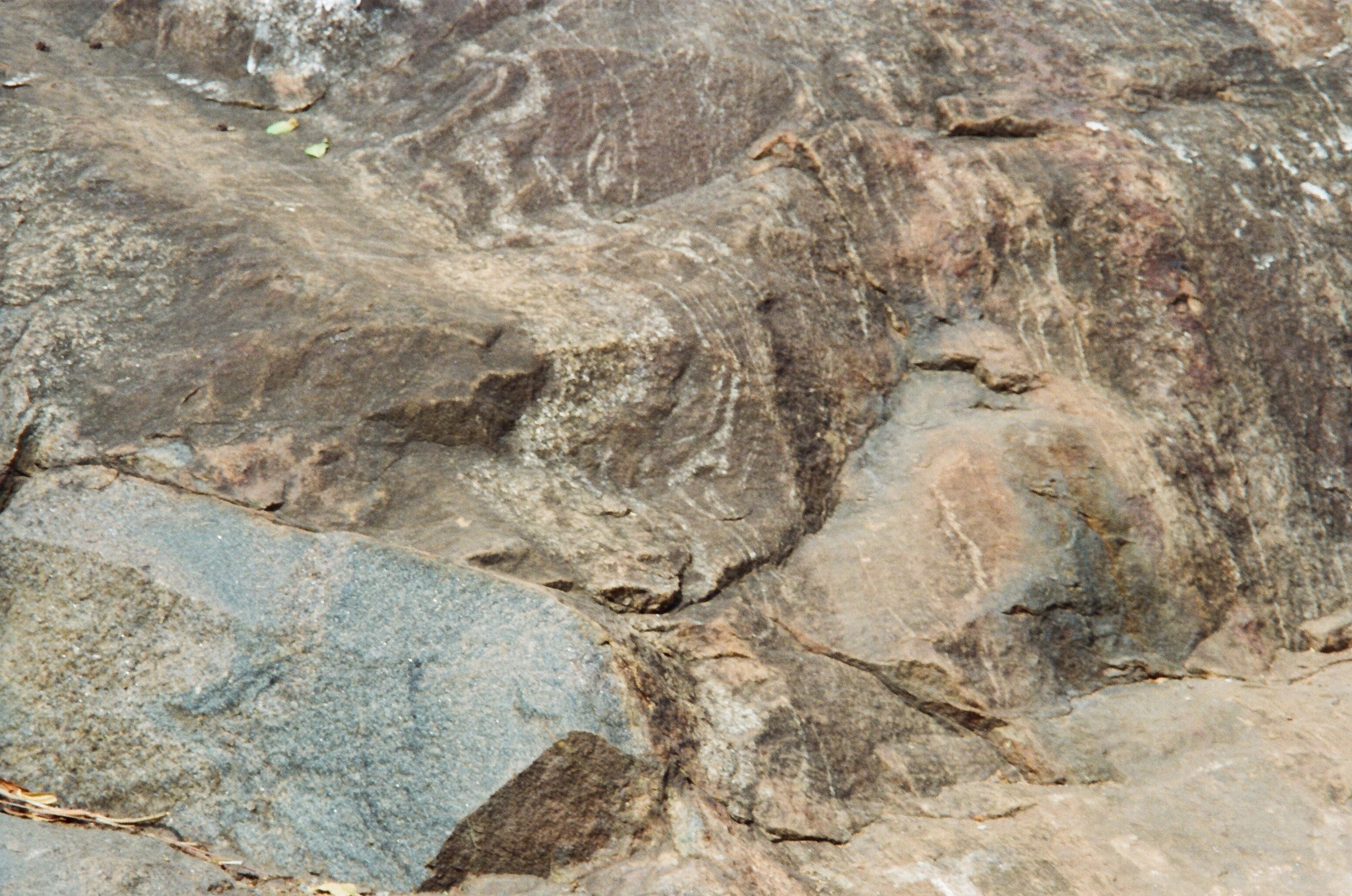
Rock quarry at St. Thomas Mount

Studies of charnockites from the region have identified several varieties based on their mineral composition. These include rocks containing different combinations of orthopyroxene, garnet, and biotite, as well as varieties such as enderbites, granulites, and gneisses related to adamellite, monzonite, and granite. Charnockites in general are bluish-grey to dark in colour and have a fresh appearance with an even-grained, granular texture. A characteristic mineral is rhombic pyroxene. Other minerals include augite, hornblende, and small amounts of opaque iron ores. Feldspar and quartz are also important components of the rock. Charnockite at St. Thomas Mount is a quartz–feldspar–hypersthene bearing metamorphosed igneous rock, characterized by two-pyroxene facies metamorphism.

The mineral composition of charnockite indicates that the rocks formed under particularly dry and high-temperature conditions. These characteristics make them important for understanding the early development of the Earth's crust. Palaeomagnetic studies were carried out at 12 sites in the area to determine the geological age of the Charnockites. The studies indicate that the charnockites at St. Thomas Mount were emplaced about 1.65 billion years ago, during the Mesoproterozoic. The study also suggested that the granulites of the Madras Block underwent crustal evolution similar to that of the Eastern Ghats, based on the similarities in their palaeomagnetic directions. It further indicated that the rock formations, even those separated by large distances, developed under similar pressure, temperature and water conditions.
