= Ilha das Couves =

Coordinates: 23°25′12″S 44°51′9″W

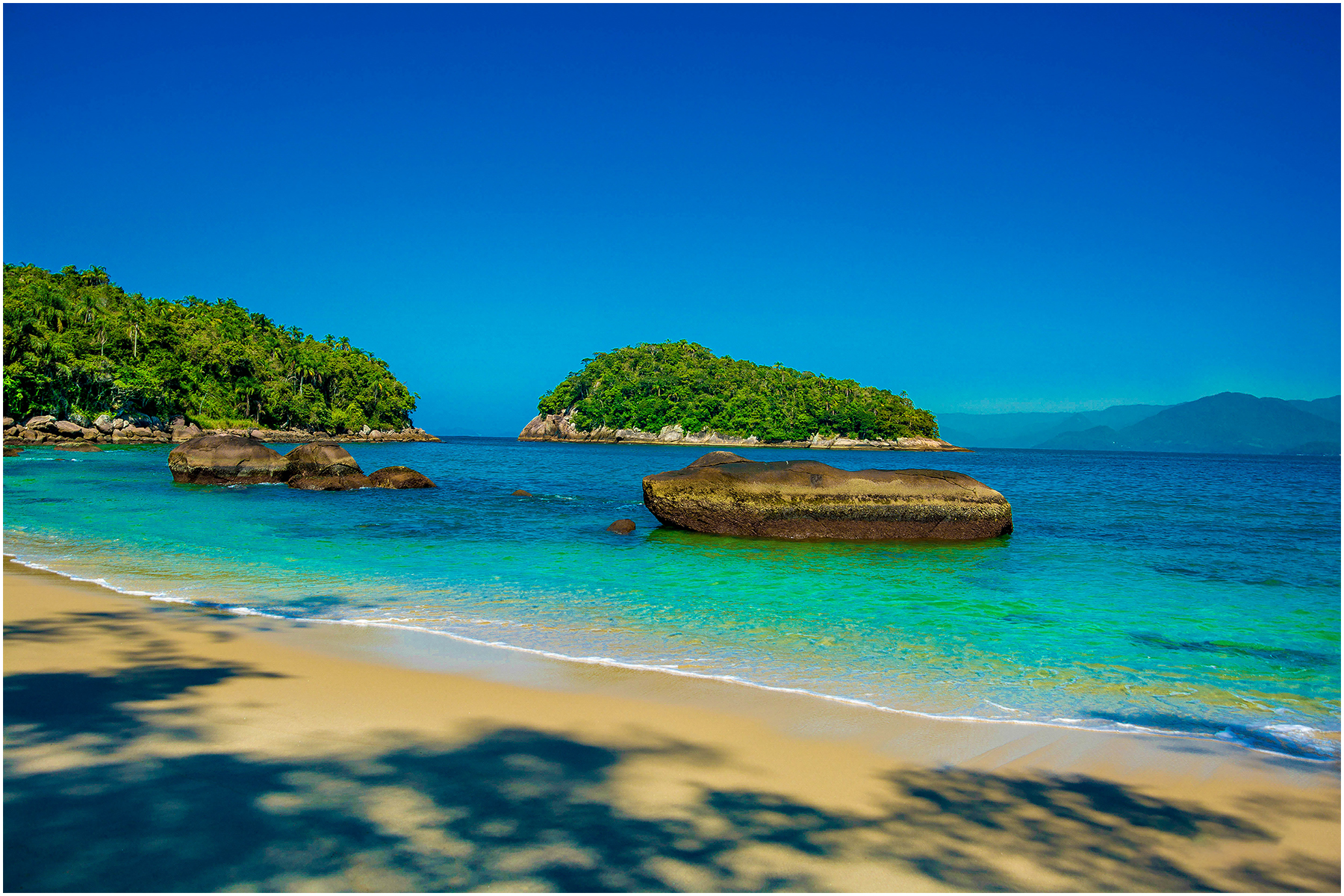
Ilha das Couves

Ilha das Couves is a Brazilian island belonging to the municipality of Ubatuba, on the north coast of the state of São Paulo. It has an area of 58 hectares and is located 2.3 kilometers from the coast. It is privately owned and inhabited by a family of caretakers. The island has a coastline of rocky shores and slopes with low vegetation and typical Atlantic Forest flora, as well as calm, transparent waters rich in marine life. It is considered one of the most beautiful and paradisiacal beaches in Brazil.

There are two ways to reach Ilha das Couves: via Picinguaba beach (the closest point to the island) or from the city of Ubatuba. The boat trip to Ilha das Couves takes approximately 20 minutes.

Its surrounding waters contain rich marine fauna, which includes salemas, parrotfish, wrasses, groupers and rays. The islet is also visited by whales.
