= Picinguaba =

Picinguabas were people Indigenous to the Campo Grande, Rio de Janeiro neighborhood of Rio de Janeiro until 1565, when the first Portuguese colonists arrived there.

It is also the name of the last beach of Ubatuba in São Paulo, which shares a border with Paraty in Rio de Janeiro, and is the research center for the Parque Estadual da Serra do Mar. Here there are numerous footpaths through the Atlantic forest, as well as beaches and rivers.
