= Charnockite =

Type of granite containing orthopyroxene

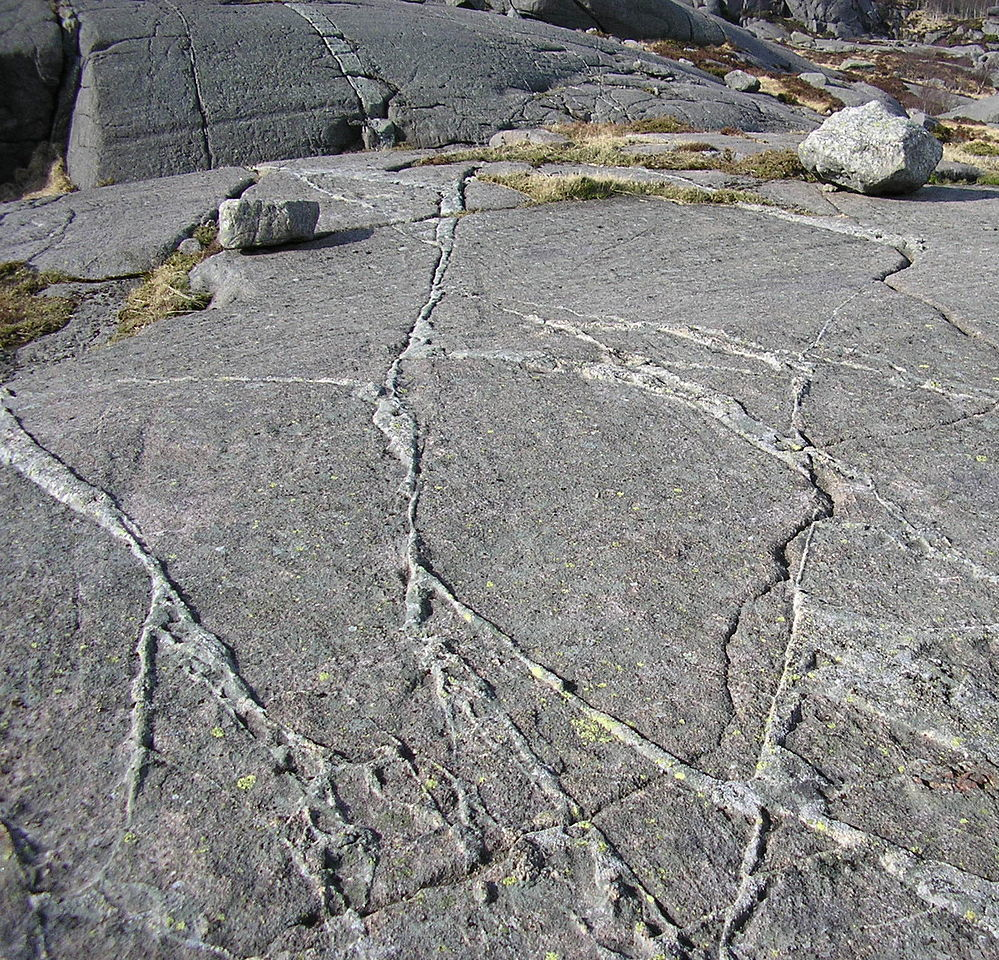
Late-stage charnockite dykes cutting anorthosite, Rogaland, Norway

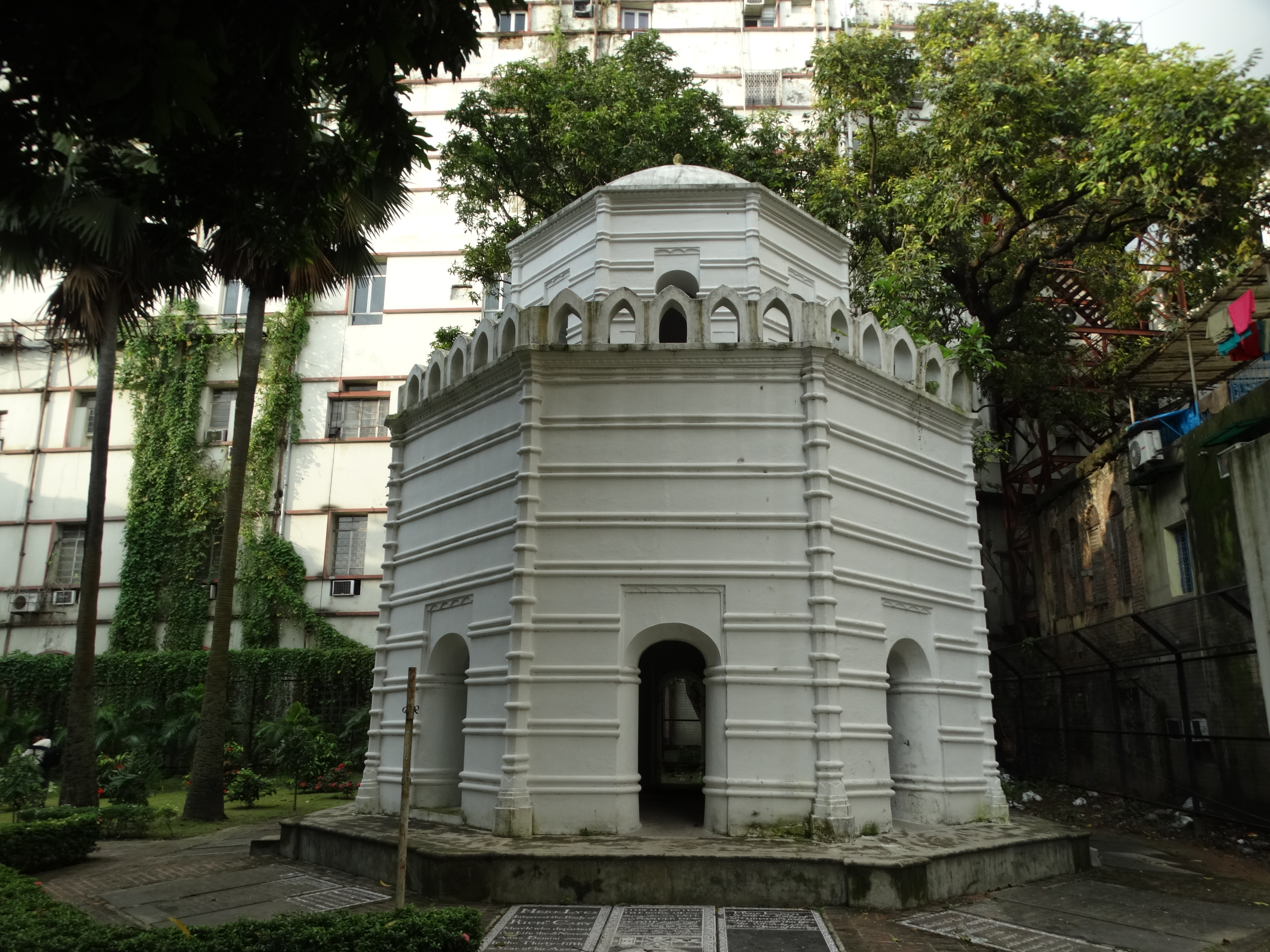
Job Charnock's Mausoleum at St John's Church compound, Kolkata

Charnockite (/ˈtʃɑːrnəkaɪt/) is any orthopyroxene-bearing quartz-feldspar rock formed at high temperature and pressure, commonly found in granulite facies’ metamorphic regions, sensu stricto as an endmember of the charnockite series.

== Charnockite series ==
The charnockite suite or series is a particularly widespread form of granofels. Granofels are one of the few non-foliated rocks to form under relatively high temperatures and pressures. This combination is generated only deep in the crust by tectonic forces that operate on a grand scale, so granofels is a product of regional, rather than contact, metamorphism. It is formed mostly from the granite clan of rocks, or occasionally from thoroughly reconstituted clays and shales. It is of wide distribution and great importance in India, Sri Lanka, Madagascar and Africa. It was named by geologist T. H. Holland in 1893 after the tombstone of Job Charnock, in St John's Church in Kolkata, India, which is made of this rock.

== Composition ==
The charnockite series includes rocks of many different types, some being felsic and rich in quartz and microcline, others mafic and full of pyroxene and olivine, while there are also intermediate varieties corresponding mineralogically to norites, quartz-norites and diorites. A special feature, recurring in many members of the group, is the presence of a strongly pleochroic, reddish or green orthopyroxene (ferroan enstatite formerly known as hypersthene). The alkali feldspars in the group are generally perthites, with intergrowths of albite and orthoclase or microcline, while the plagioclases are generally antiperthites and intermediate mesoperthites occur too. Rocks of the charnockite series may be named by adding orthopyroxene to the normal igneous nomenclature (e.g. orthopyroxene-granite), but specific names are in widespread use such as norite, mangerite, enderbite, jotunite, farsundite, opdalite and charnockite (in the strict sense); equivalents of gabbro, monzonite, tonalite, monzodiorite, monzogranite, granodiorite and granite. The BGS classification is unambiguous, replacing local names with standard igneous nomenclature prefixed by 'charnockitic'. Thus, 'charnockite' becomes 'charnockitic granite' and rocks with the traditional names 'mangerite' and 'enderbite' become 'charnockitic monzonite' and 'charnockitic tonalite' respectively.

== Gallery ==
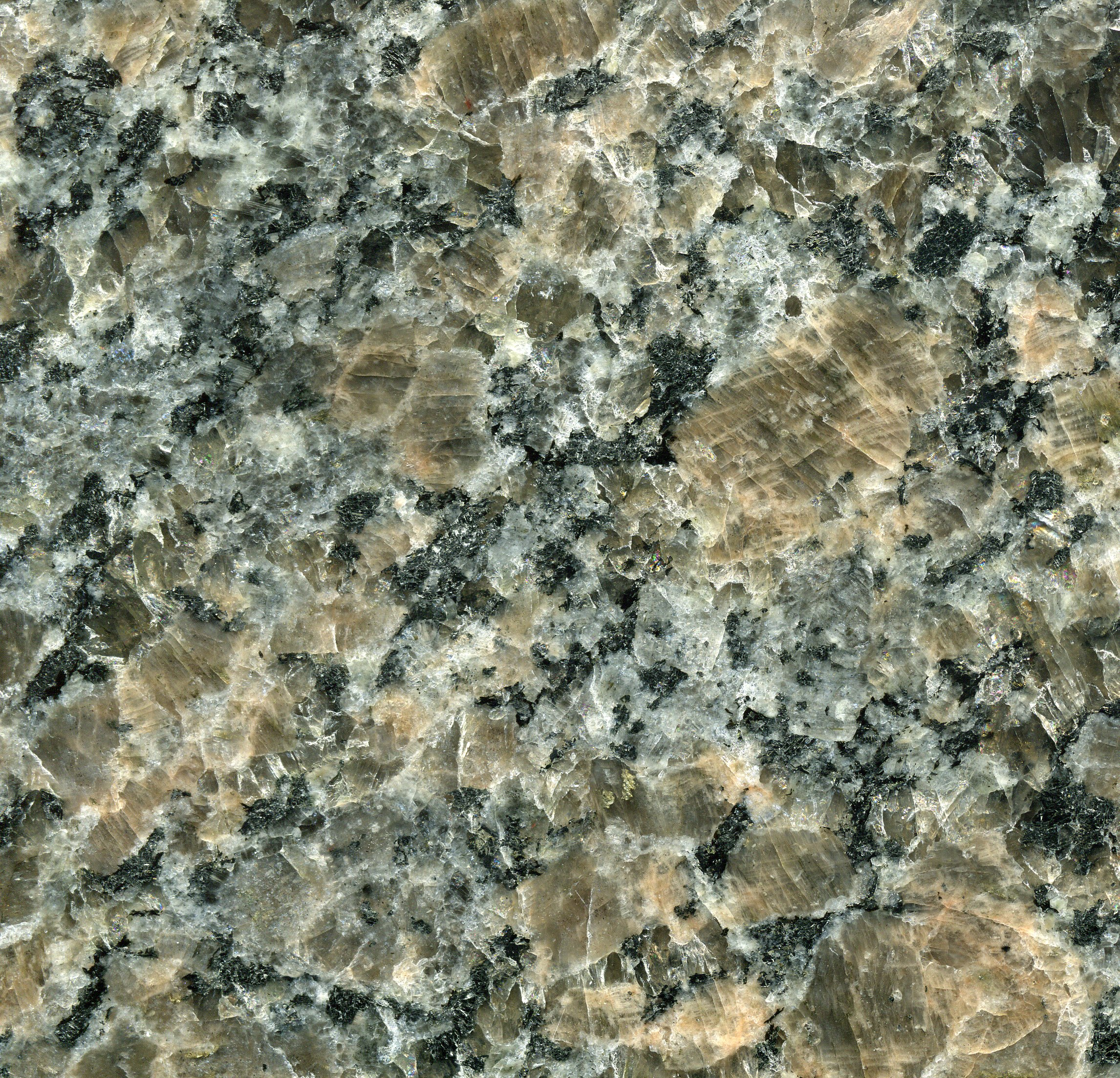
Charnockite (porphyritic quartz mangerite), sold as "Nara Brown Granite", quarried in southern Quebec

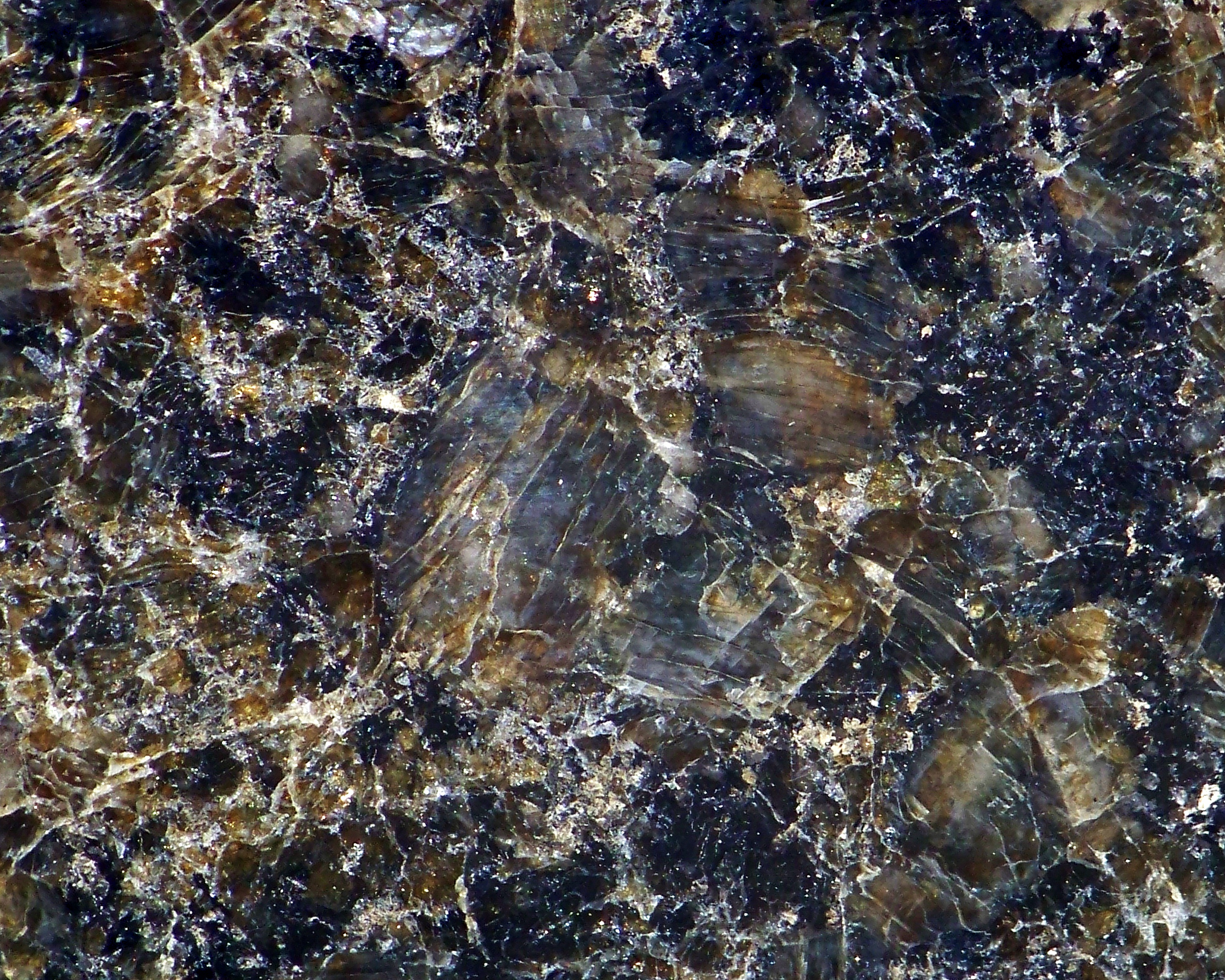
Charnockite plate from Varberg, Sweden

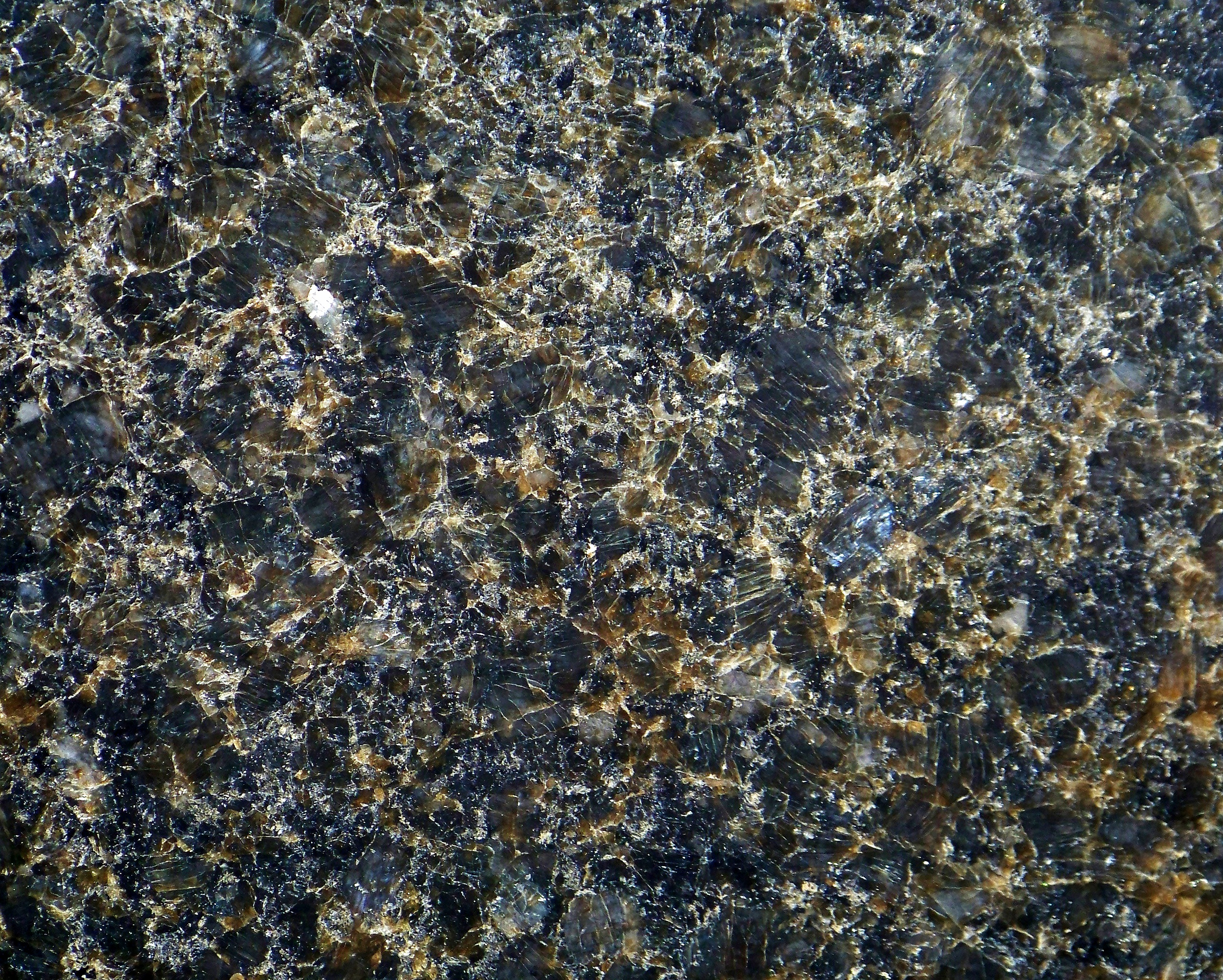
Charnockite plate from Varberg, Sweden

== Geology ==
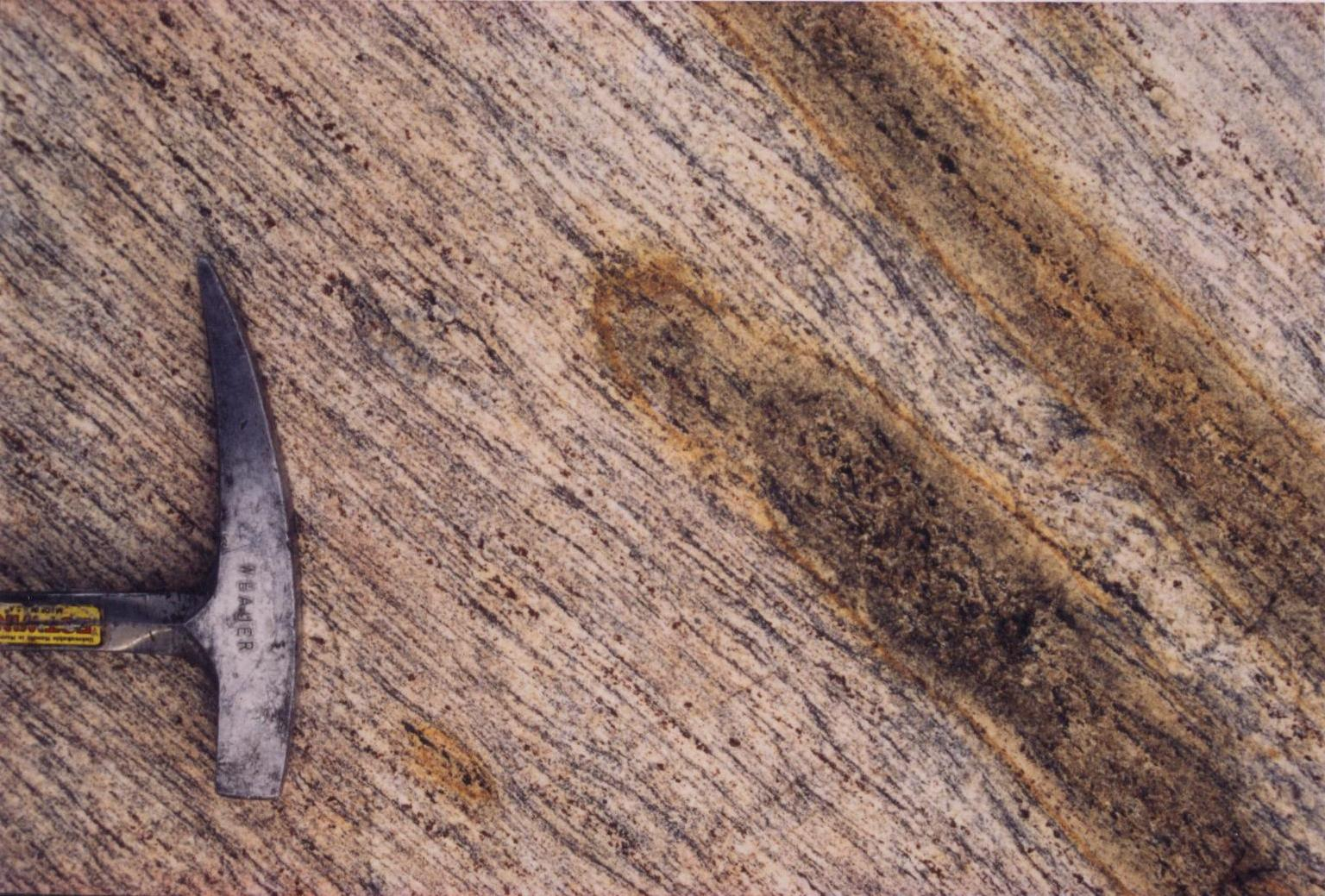
Incipient Charnockite, Dronning Maud Land, Antarctica

All charnockites were once thought to be igneous, but it is now recognized that many are metamorphic, because, despite the high temperatures and pressures, the original protolith never actually melted. However, some orthopyroxene-bearing granites with distinct igneous features exist, and these rocks also fall within the definition of charnockite. Many of the minerals of these rocks are schillerized, as they contain minute platy or rod-shaped inclusions, disposed parallel to certain crystallographic planes or axes. The reflection of light from the surfaces of these inclusions gives the minerals often a peculiar appearance, e.g. the quartz is blue and opalescent, the feldspar has a milky shimmer like moonshine, the hypersthene has a bronzy metalloidal gleam. Very often the different rock types occur in close association as one set forms bands alternating with another set, or veins traversing it, and where one facies appears the others also usually are found.

The term charnockite in this sense is consequently not the name of a rock, but of an assemblage of rock types. The assemblage is connected by origin, the differentiation of the same parent magma. The banded structure which these rocks commonly present in the field is only in a small measure due to plastic deformation, but is to a large extent original, and has been produced by flow in a viscous crystallizing intrusive magma, together with differentiation or segregation of the mass into bands of different chemical and mineralogical composition. There have also been, of course, earth movements acting on the solid rock at a later time and injection of dikes both parallel to and across the primary foliation.

== Distribution ==
The charnockites are widely distributed in the southern hemisphere. They, or rocks very similar to them, also occur in Norway, France, Sweden, Germany, Scotland and North America, though in these countries they have been mostly described as pyroxene granulites, pyroxene gneisses, anorthosites, or other names. They are typically of Proterozoic age.

In India they form the Nilgiri Hills, the Shevaroys, the Biligirirangan Hills and part of the Western Ghats, extending southward to Kanyakumari and reappearing in Sri Lanka.

A commercial variety called green ubatuba is found in Brazil.

== Age ==
While the granulite facies metamorphism is dated as 2.5 Ga (billion years ago) in Nilgiris, Shevaroys, Madras (Chennai) regions, the granulite facies event transforming the granitic gneisses into charnockite in the southern part of the South Indian granulite terrain is dated as 550 Ma (million years ago). Although they are certainly for the most part igneous gneisses (or orthogneisses), rocks occur along with them, such as marbles, scapolite limestones, and corundum rocks, which were probably of sedimentary origin.

== See also ==
- Charnockite, St. Thomas Mount
- Khondalite
