= Enderbite =

Igneous rock of the charnockite series

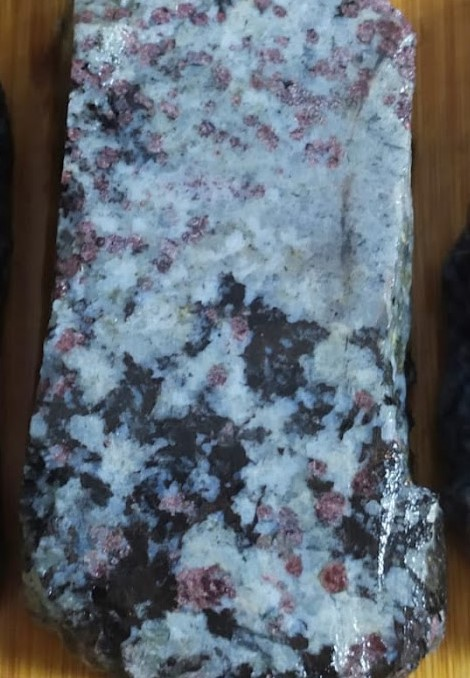
Enderbite from Vinnytsia Oblast, Ukraine

In geology, enderbite is an igneous rock of the charnockite series, consisting essentially of quartz, antiperthite (or perthite), orthopyroxene (usually hypersthene) and magnetite, and is equivalent to an orthopyroxene bearing tonalite. It is named for its occurrence in Enderby Land, Antarctica.
