= Ubatuba =

Municipality in São Paulo, Brazil

- Municipality
- Municipality of Ubatuba
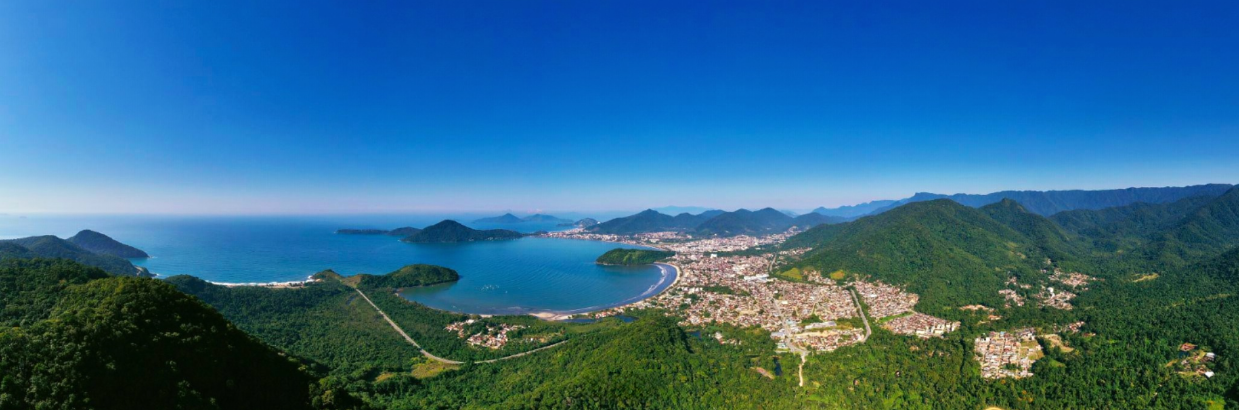
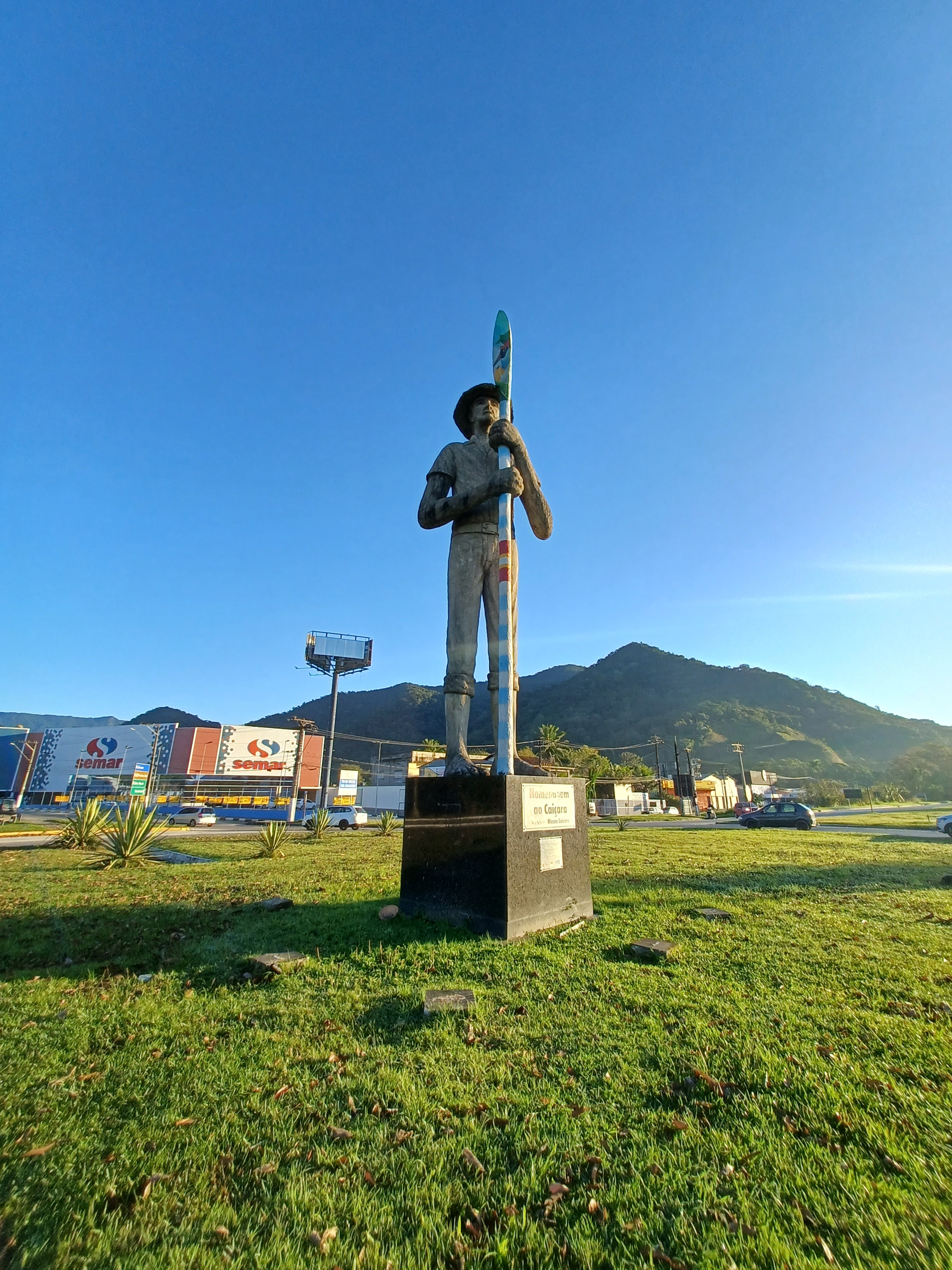
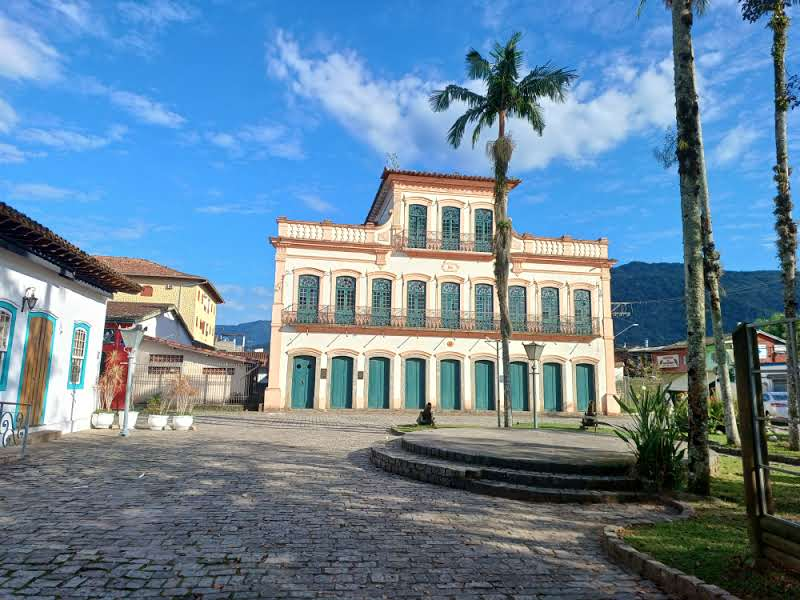
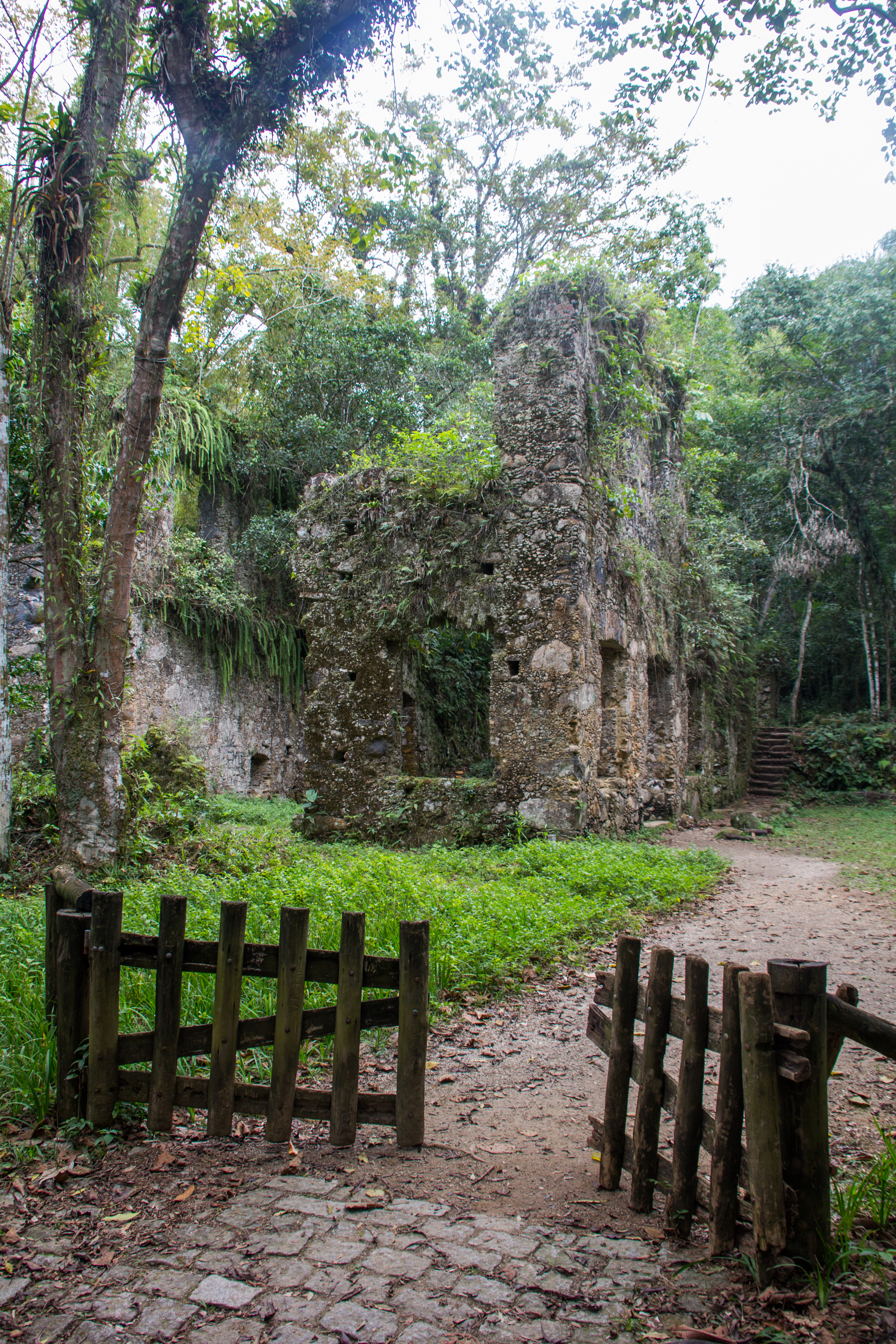
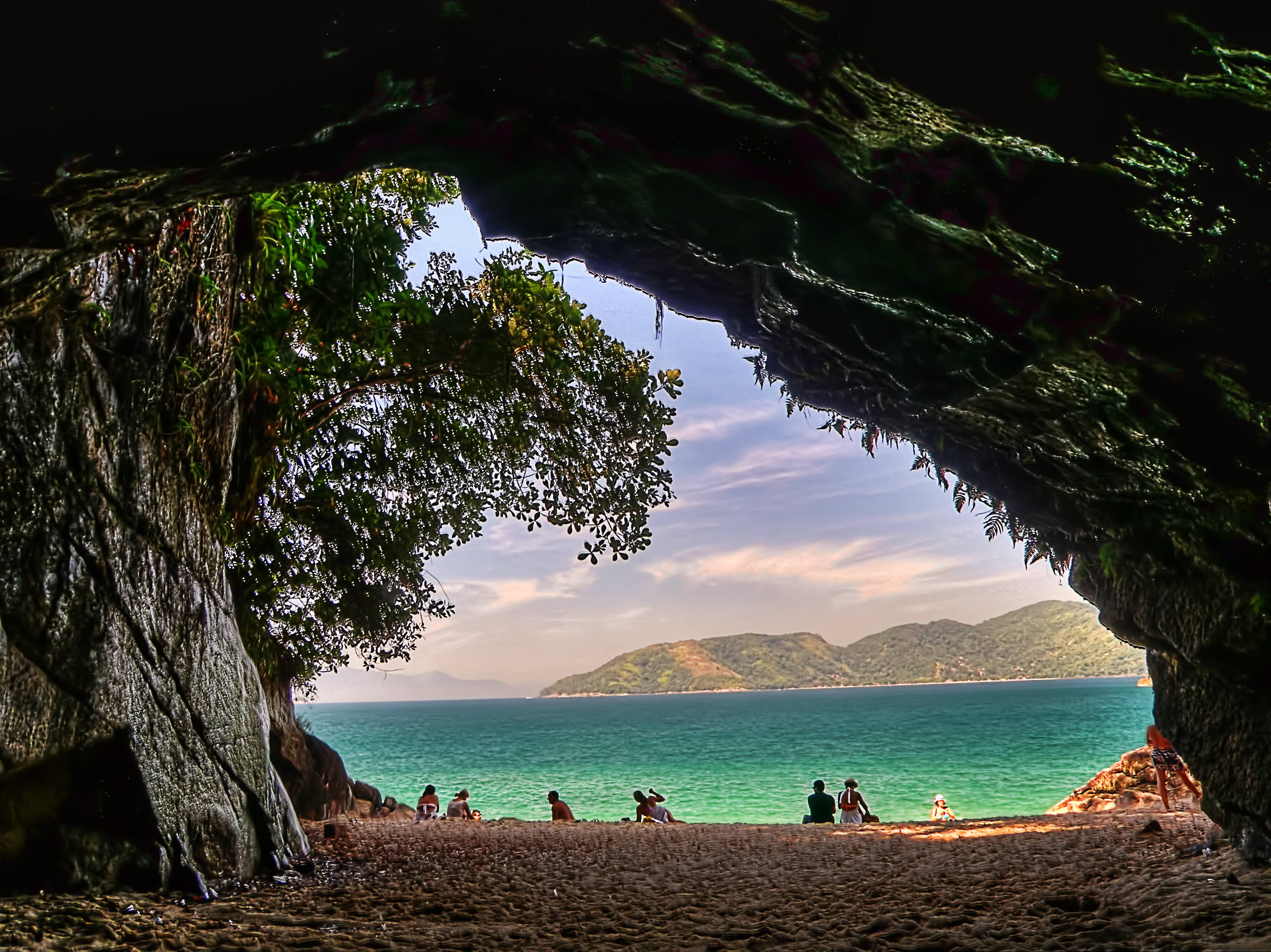
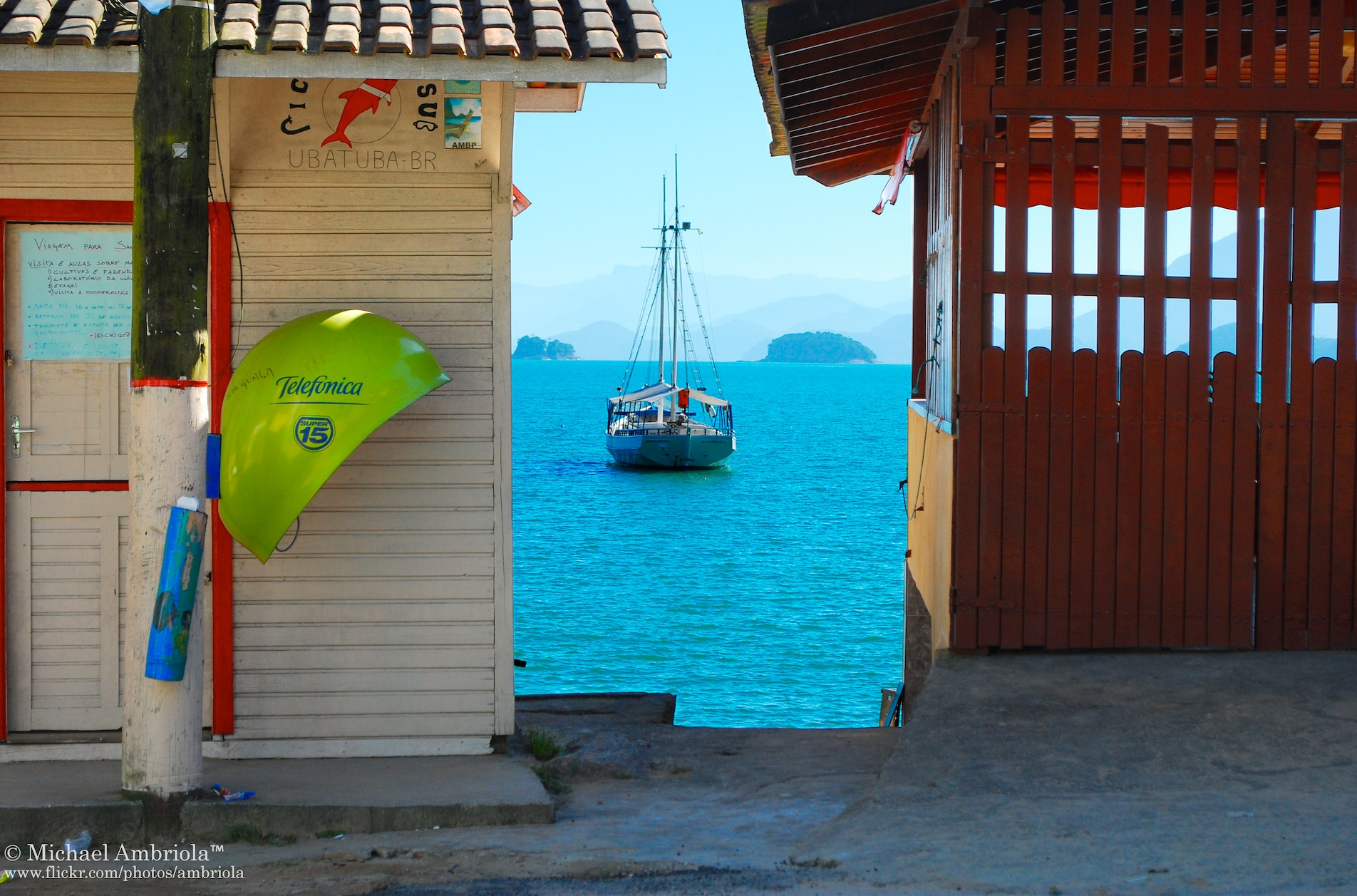
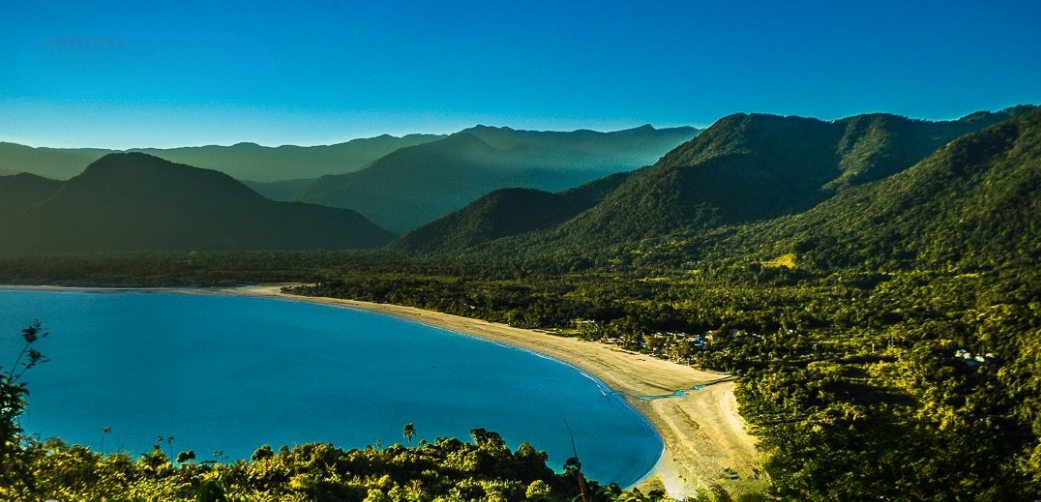
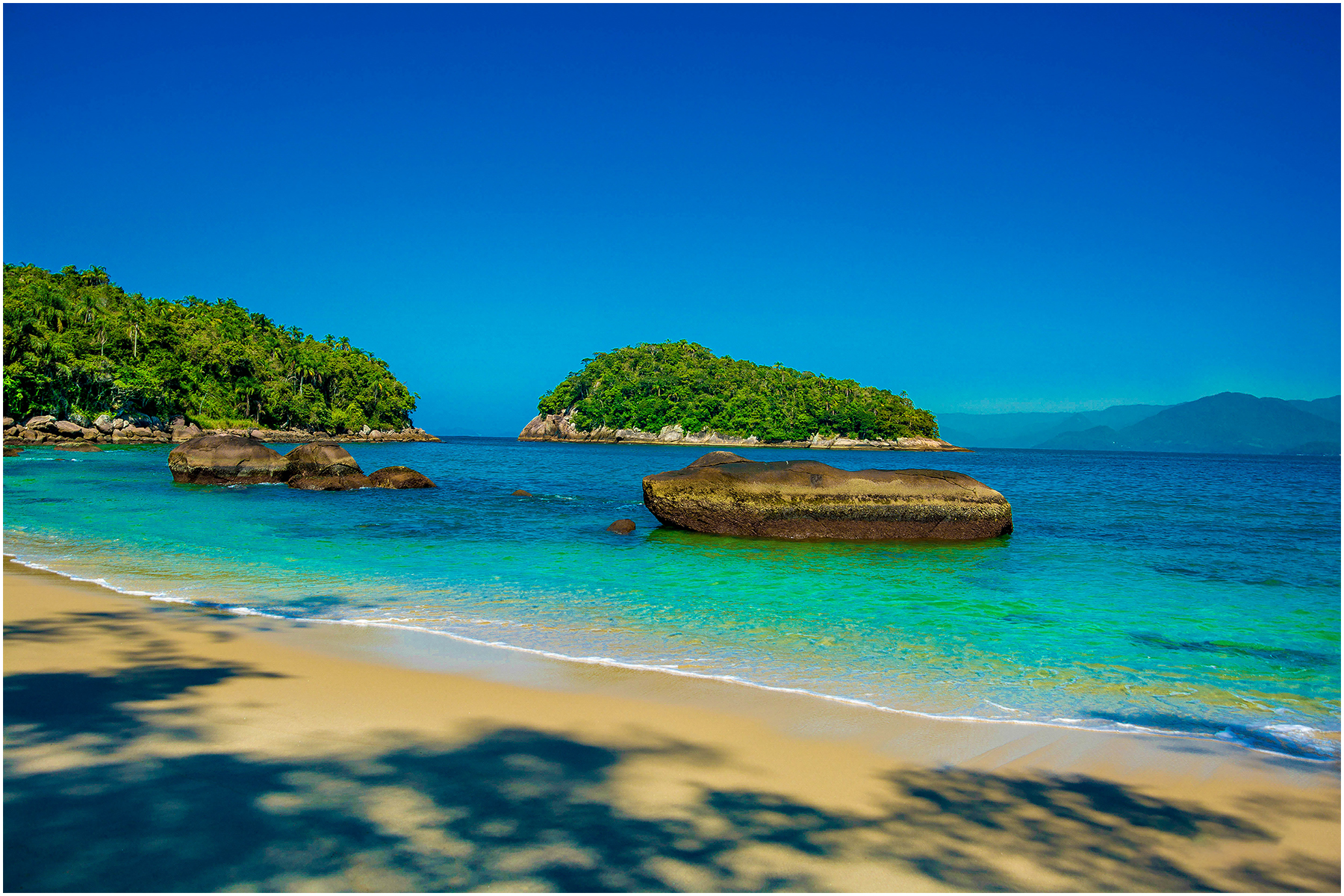
- Panoramic view of Ubatuba The Caiçaras Sobrado do Porto Lagoinha Ruins Sununga Beach seen from the Crying Cave Picinguaba Village Serra do Mar, a World Heritage by UNESCO Ilha das Couves

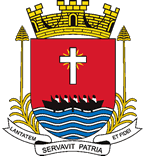
- Flag Coat of arms
- Nickname: Capital do Surf (Surf capital)
- Motto: Servavit Patria
- Location in the state of São Paulo and Brazil
- Coordinates: 23°26′22″S 45°4′12″W
- Country: Brazil
- Region: Southeast
- State: São Paulo
- Metropolitan Region: Vale do Paraíba e Litoral Norte
- Settled: 28 October 1637

Government
  - Mayor: Márcio Maciel (MDB)

Area
  - Total: 723.88 km^{2} (279.49 sq mi)
- Elevation: 3 m (9.8 ft)

Population (2020)
  - Total: 91,824
  - Density: 114.1/km^{2} (296/sq mi)
- Time zone: UTC−3 (BRT)
- Postal code: 11680-000
- Area code: +55 12
- HDI (2010): 0.751 – high
- Website: ubatuba.sp.gov.br

Ubatuba is a Brazilian municipality, located on the northeast coast, in the state of São Paulo. It is part of the Metropolitan Region of Vale do Paraíba e Litoral Norte. The population is 92,819 (2021 est.) in an area of 723.88 km^{2}, of which 83% is located in the Serra do Mar State Park.

Ubatuba is one of fifteen municipalities in São Paulo that the state considers to be coastal resorts because they satisfy specific standards set by state legislation. This classification entitles these communities more money from the state for the development of regional tourism. In addition, the municipality gains the right to add the title of seaside resort to its name, a word used both in the official municipal file and in state references.

== Toponymy ==
Its name is of Tupi origin, and it has at least two meanings. Ubá means canoe in Tupi, whereas u'ubá means river cane, which is a type of grass utilized by the indigenous people to make arrows. Because tyba means "gathering", the city's name might refer to either "gathering of river reeds" or "gathering of boats."

== History ==
Ubatuba was the place where the Portuguese signed the first treaty of peace of the Americas with the Tupinambá native tribe (The Yperoig Peace Treaty - Tratado de Paz de Iperoig), a treaty that kept Brazil in Portuguese hands, with only one language and one faith (Catholicism). Back in the 16th century, the Tupinambá families were forced into slavery, working on sugar cane plantations along the Southern Shores surrounding the towns of São Vicente and Itanhaém, a region also called "Morpion" at that time (according to André Thévet - "Singularités de la France Antarctique").

The Tupinambá responded to this outrage with the Tamoio Confederation, a powerful military alliance that stood to destroy São Vicente, with the help of the French, who had founded a Protestant refugee colony, France Antarctique in Guanabara Bay before the foundation of Rio de Janeiro. The Portuguese sent two Jesuit priests, Fathers Anchieta and Nobrega, to Ubatuba (a tribe named Yperoig), to make peace with the Tupinambá Indians. Anchieta was kept as a hostage and Nobrega returned to Saint Vincent along with the Chief Cunhambebe to make arrangements for the final Treaty. The Portuguese won, destroying France Antarctique and keeping the land.

== Geography ==
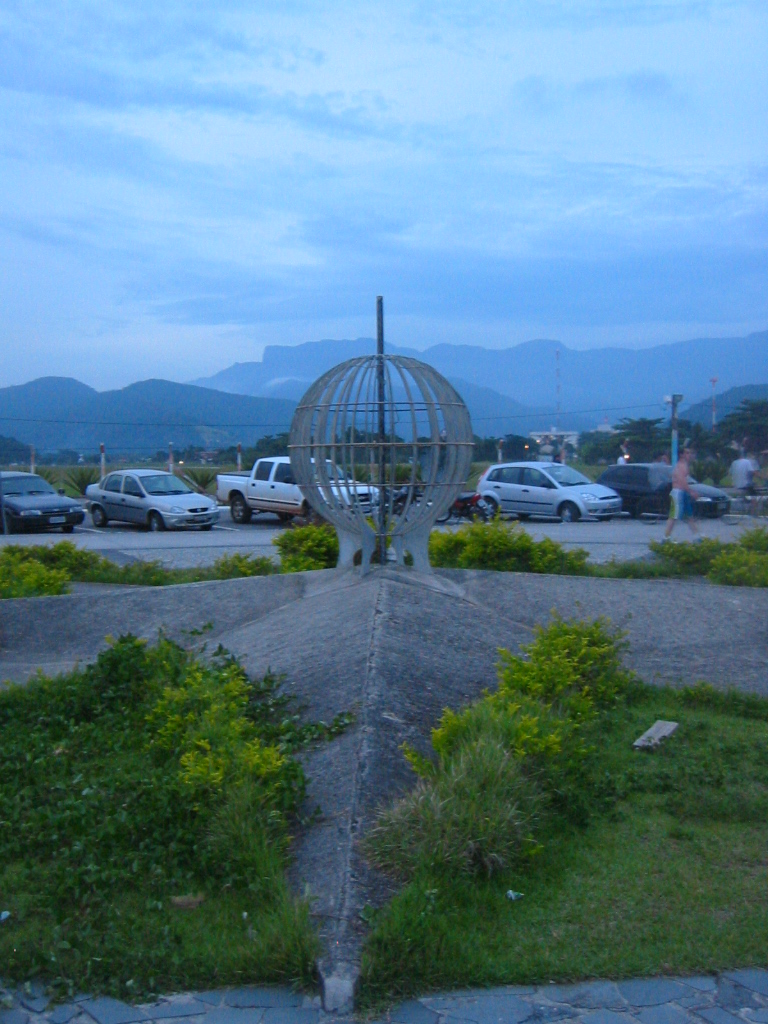
Point where the Tropic of Capricorn crosses the city

Ubatuba is linked with the Rodovia Longitudinal or the BR-101. It is located east of São Paulo and east-northeast of Santos and west of Rio de Janeiro. At latitude 23°26'21.45", it is bounded to the north by Paraty (Rio de Janeiro), to the south by Caraguatatuba, to the west by Cunha, São Luiz do Paraitinga, and Natividade da Serra, and to the east by the Atlantic Ocean. The city lies on the Tropic of Capricorn, which crosses just in front of the municipal airport runway.

The urban area is mainly concentrated in the Atlantic and valley areas. The city frequently receives rain, hence the nickname Uba Chuva (chuva being Portuguese for "rain"). Much of the land to the north is forested and mountainous, forming a part of the Serra do Mar mountains. Serra do Mar State Park was established in order to conserve and preserve the Atlantic Forest and covers 83% of the municipality, having a few connector roads through the mountain range and consisting of three centers within Ubatuba: Cunha-Indaiá, Santa Virgínia and Picinguaba.

The municipality contains part of the Tupinambás Ecological Station, which protects some of the coastal islands. A marine park was created under Projeto TAMAR (TAMAR Project) to protect sea turtles. In addition, the Oceanographic Institute of the University of São Paulo runs the Clarimundo de Jesus research base in Ubatuba.

=== Climate ===
Ubatuba has a tropical rainforest climate (Köppen: Af). It rains during the entire year, more frequently during summer, with the rainfall about 2,520 millimeters/year. It has no dry season.

Climate data for Ubatuba (1981–2010 normals, extremes 1961–1967, 1971–2009)
Month	Jan	Feb	Mar	Apr	May	Jun	Jul	Aug	Sep	Oct	Nov	Dec	Year
Record high °C (°F)	38.8 (101.8)	38.8 (101.8)	38.2 (100.8)	36.6 (97.9)	36.0 (96.8)	34.9 (94.8)	35.2 (95.4)	38.9 (102.0)	40.8 (105.4)	38.0 (100.4)	39.4 (102.9)	37.8 (100.0)	40.8 (105.4)
Mean daily maximum °C (°F)	30.3 (86.5)	31.0 (87.8)	29.9 (85.8)	28.4 (83.1)	26.1 (79.0)	25.3 (77.5)	24.4 (75.9)	24.9 (76.8)	24.5 (76.1)	25.9 (78.6)	27.5 (81.5)	29.0 (84.2)	27.3 (81.1)
Daily mean °C (°F)	25.3 (77.5)	25.6 (78.1)	24.7 (76.5)	23.1 (73.6)	20.4 (68.7)	18.8 (65.8)	18.5 (65.3)	18.9 (66.0)	19.8 (67.6)	21.5 (70.7)	22.9 (73.2)	24.3 (75.7)	21.9 (71.4)
Mean daily minimum °C (°F)	21.5 (70.7)	21.5 (70.7)	20.9 (69.6)	19.2 (66.6)	16.3 (61.3)	14.5 (58.1)	13.6 (56.5)	14.3 (57.7)	16.0 (60.8)	18.0 (64.4)	19.2 (66.6)	20.4 (68.7)	18.0 (64.4)
Record low °C (°F)	12.7 (54.9)	14.8 (58.6)	13.1 (55.6)	10.2 (50.4)	6.4 (43.5)	3.7 (38.7)	5.3 (41.5)	5.6 (42.1)	6.9 (44.4)	10.2 (50.4)	11.1 (52.0)	12.9 (55.2)	3.7 (38.7)
Average precipitation mm (inches)	312.9 (12.32)	290.5 (11.44)	311.1 (12.25)	232.5 (9.15)	122.9 (4.84)	94.2 (3.71)	92.6 (3.65)	74.4 (2.93)	196.9 (7.75)	245.5 (9.67)	263.6 (10.38)	280.4 (11.04)	2,517.5 (99.11)
Average precipitation days (≥ 1.0 mm)	17	15	16	13	9	7	8	8	13	15	16	17	154
Average relative humidity (%)	82.4	82.7	84.6	84.8	84.7	84.4	84.3	83.3	85.3	84.5	82.7	82.2	83.8
Mean monthly sunshine hours	143.6	157.5	152.0	151.9	150.8	154.5	154.0	155.1	105.2	110.9	121.0	131.5	1,688
Source: Instituto Nacional de Meteorologia

== Demography ==
Historical population (municipality)
Year	Population	%±
1920	10,179
1940	7,255	−28.7%
1950	7,941	9.5%
1960	10,294	29.6%
1970	15,203	47.7%
1980	27,139	78.5%
1991	47,398	74.6%
2000	66,861	41.1%
2010	78,801	17.9%
2022	92,981	18.0%

== Tourism ==
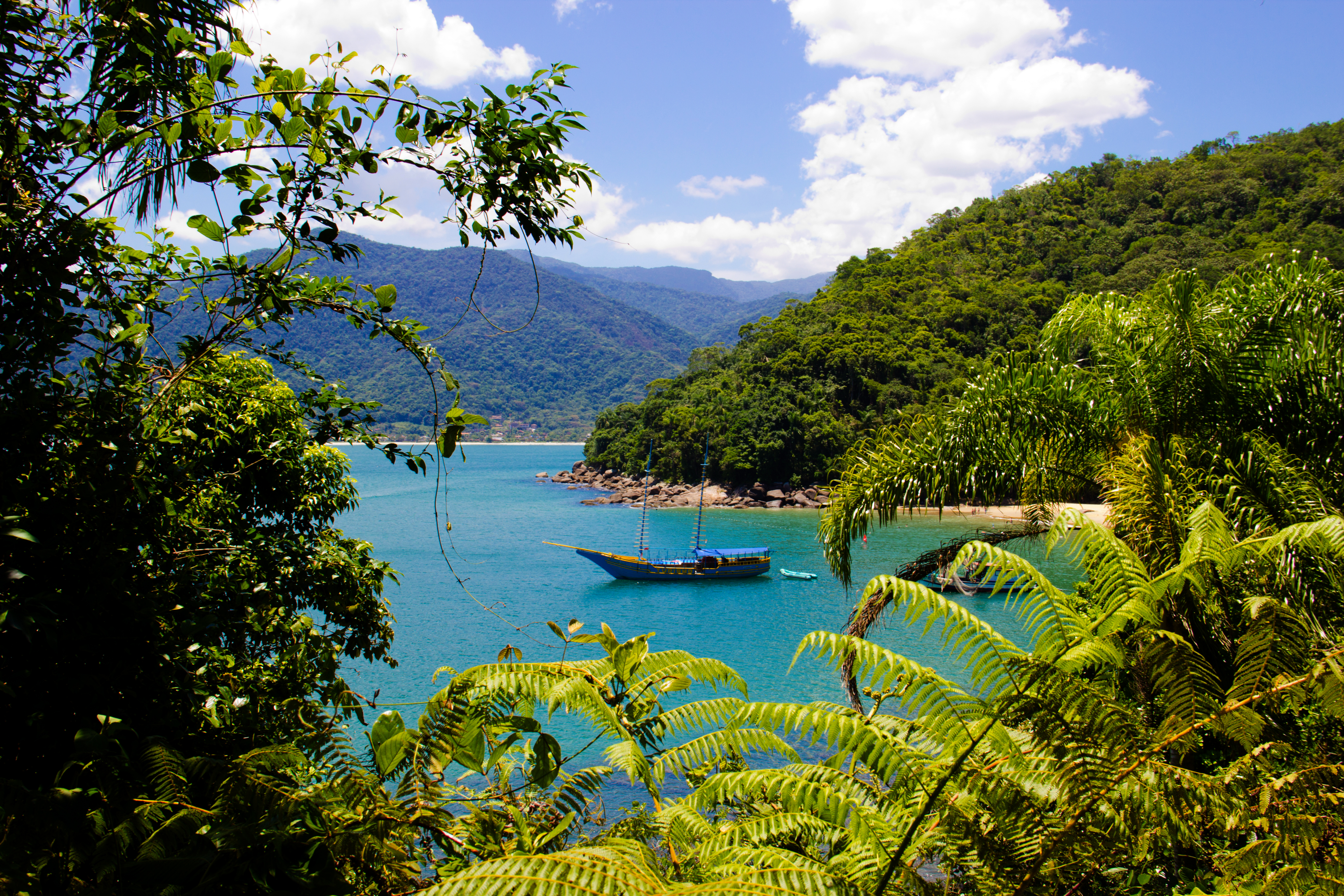
Bonete beach

Ubatuba is an important tourist city, receiving tourists from many parts of Brazil and served by Gastão Madeira Airport. Ubatuba features over 100 beaches. Among these are Maranduba, Lázaro, Itamambuca, Vermelha, Grande, Enseada, Perequê and Saco da Ribeira. Ubatuba also features an island named Anchieta after José de Anchieta. It has been a nature preserve since March 22, 1977.

Ubatuba is considered, by law, as "The Surf Capital of São Paulo State". The city has received this honour because more than ten important surf contests are held off its beaches every year, including two world qualifying series, two Super Surf Pro series, and other competitions supported by such well-established brands as Billabong, Quiksilver and Dunkelvolk (which sponsored the 2009 edition of Ubatuba Surf Contest with more than 120 athletes).

Lately, the city has also been known by its biodiversity, especially in relation to birds. There are more than 565 different bird species already identified within the city (as of April 2012).

== Media ==
In telecommunications, the city was served by Companhia de Telecomunicações do Estado de São Paulo until 1975, when it began to be served by Telecomunicações de São Paulo. In July 1998, this company was acquired by Telefónica, which adopted the Vivo brand in 2012.

The company is currently an operator of cell phones, fixed lines, internet (fiber optics/4G) and television (satellite and cable).

== See also ==
- List of municipalities in São Paulo
- Interior of São Paulo
- Green ubatuba
