= Green ubatuba =

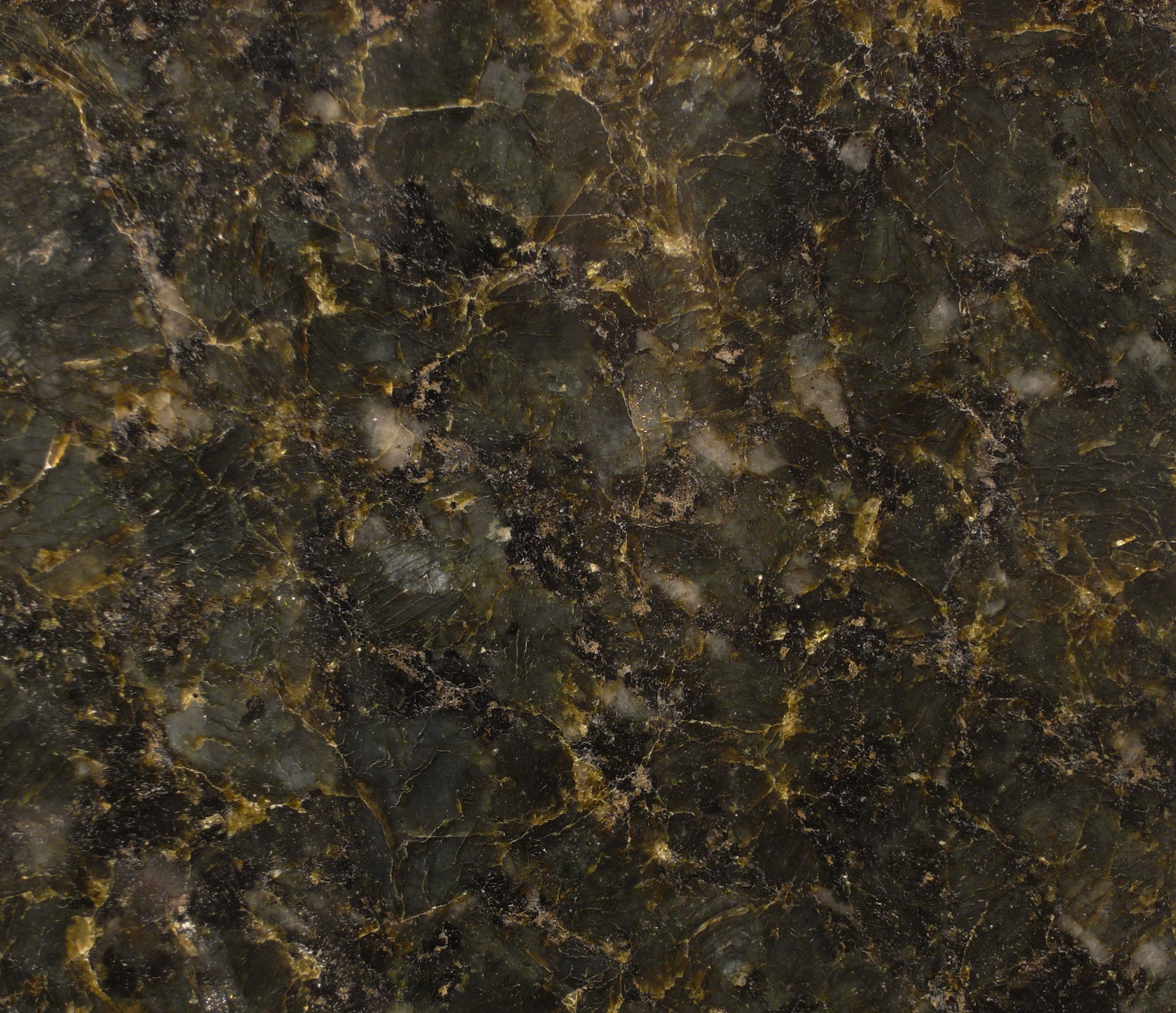
Green ubatuba, polished (size 12x10 cm)

Green ubatuba (Port. verde ubatuba) is the commercial name of a Brazilian charnockite, although it is often sold as a granite. It comes from the Ubatuba area of Brazil, where it forms part of the Neoproterozoic Ribeira Belt. As its name indicates, it is green in color, dark green and almost a black appearance when seen in low light. It contains large (10 cm) phenocrysts of alkali feldspar. It is widely used in home renovations and landscaping.
