= Serra do Mar State Park =

State park in Sao Paulo, Brazil

- Parque Estadual da Serra do Mar
- IUCN category II (national park)
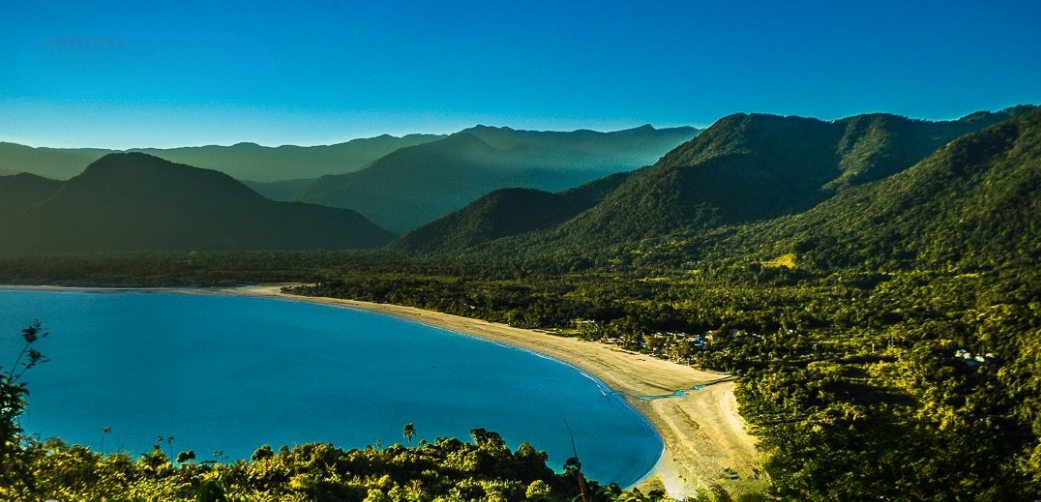
- Ubatuba in the Serra do Mar State Park

- Location within São Paulo state Location within Brazil
- Location: Caraguatatuba, Cunha, São Paulo, Juquitiba, Mongaguá, Itanhaém, Cubatão, Pedro de Toledo, Ubatuba, São Luiz do Paraitinga, São Sebastião
- Coordinates: 23°21′S 45°08′W
- Area: 332,000 hectares (820,000 acres)
- Designation: State park
- Created: 1977
- Administrator: Fundação Florestal

The Serra do Mar State Park (Portuguese: Parque Estadual da Serra do Mar) is a state park in the state of São Paulo, Brazil. It covers 315,000 hectares (780,000 acres) of the Serra do Mar mountain range, and is one of the largest remaining areas of continuous Atlantic Forest. The state park stretches from the border of Rio de Janeiro to Itariri in the southern part of São Paulo.

== Location ==
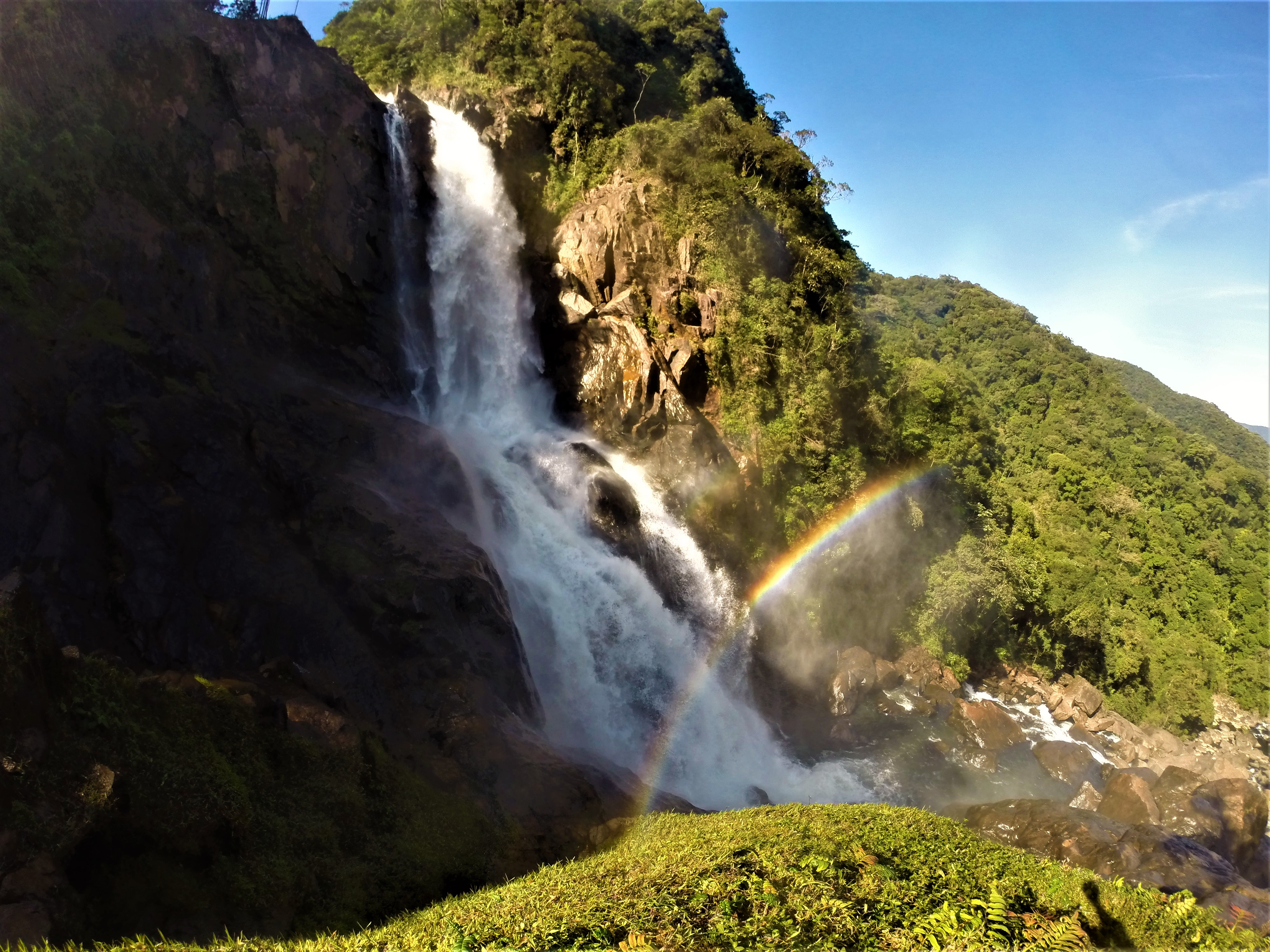
Cachoeira da Usina, located in São Paulo city

The Serra do Mar State Park was created in 1977 when the BR-101 coastal highway was built, and expanded in 2010. With an area of 332,000 hectares (820,000 acres) in 25 municipalities, it is the largest Atlantic Forest protected area in Brazil. The park contains some traditional communities of quilombolas, Amerindians, caipiras and caiçaras. It connects the Serra do Mar forests of Rio de Janeiro to the Vale do Ribeira and Paraná. The escarpments of the park dominate the coast of São Paulo. It is part of the 221,754 hectares (547,970 acres) Bocaina Mosaic, created in 2006.

== Conservation ==
The Serra do Mar State Park is managed by the Forestry Foundation of São Paulo, which is linked to the São Paulo Secretariat of State for the Environment. The forest provides refuge to hundreds of species of birds and other animals. The park protects water sources that supply part of the São Paulo metropolitan region, Baixada Santista, Litoral Norte, and the Paraíba Valley. It also helps moderate the climate and maintain the stability of the slopes.

== Sources ==
- Mosaico de Unidades de Conservação da Bocaina - SP e RJ (PDF) (in Portuguese), RBMA
- Sobre o Parque Estadual Serra do Mar (in Portuguese), Fundação Florestal
