= Cunha, São Paulo =

Municipality in the state of São Paulo in Brazil

Cunha
- Municipality
- Municipality of Cunha
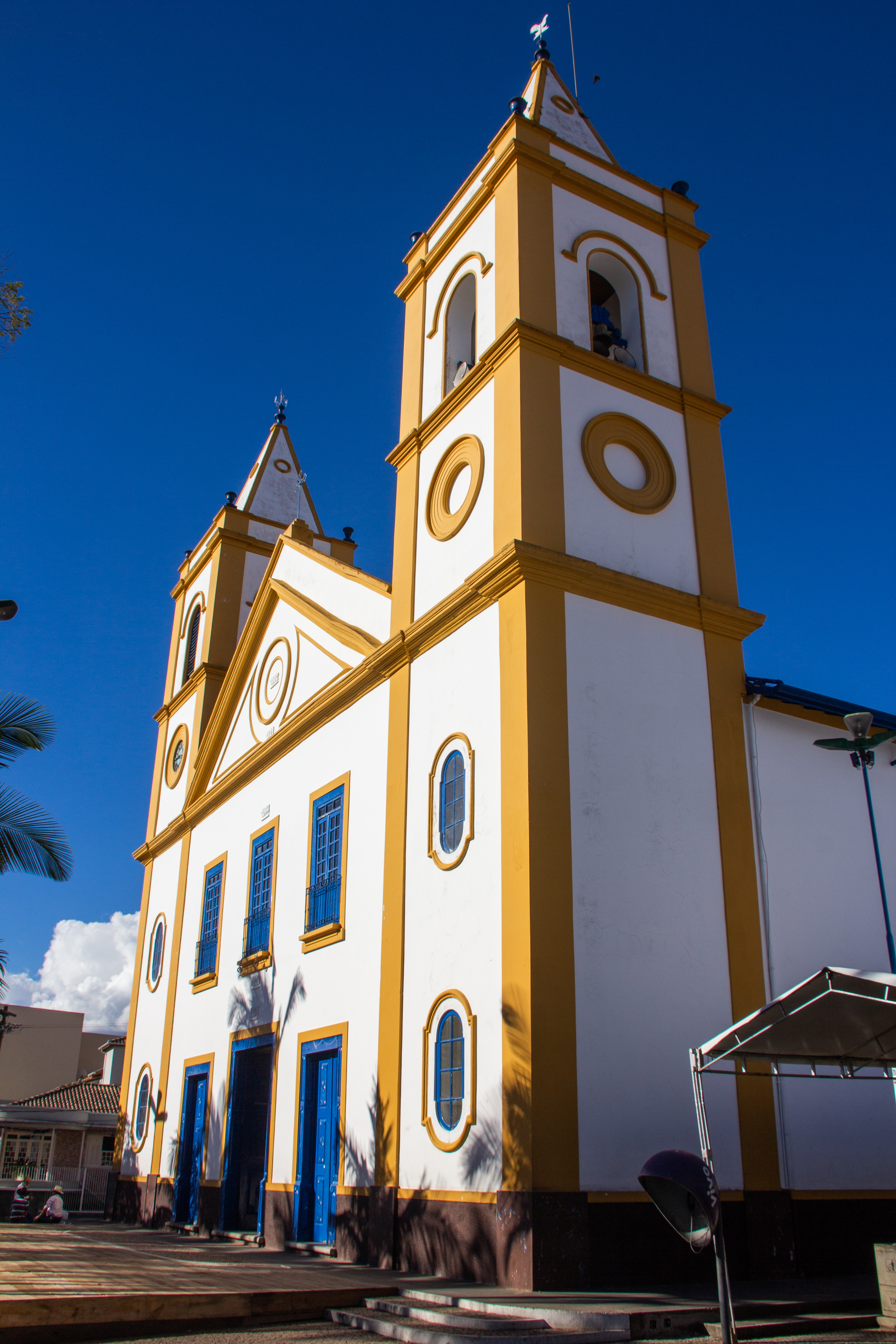
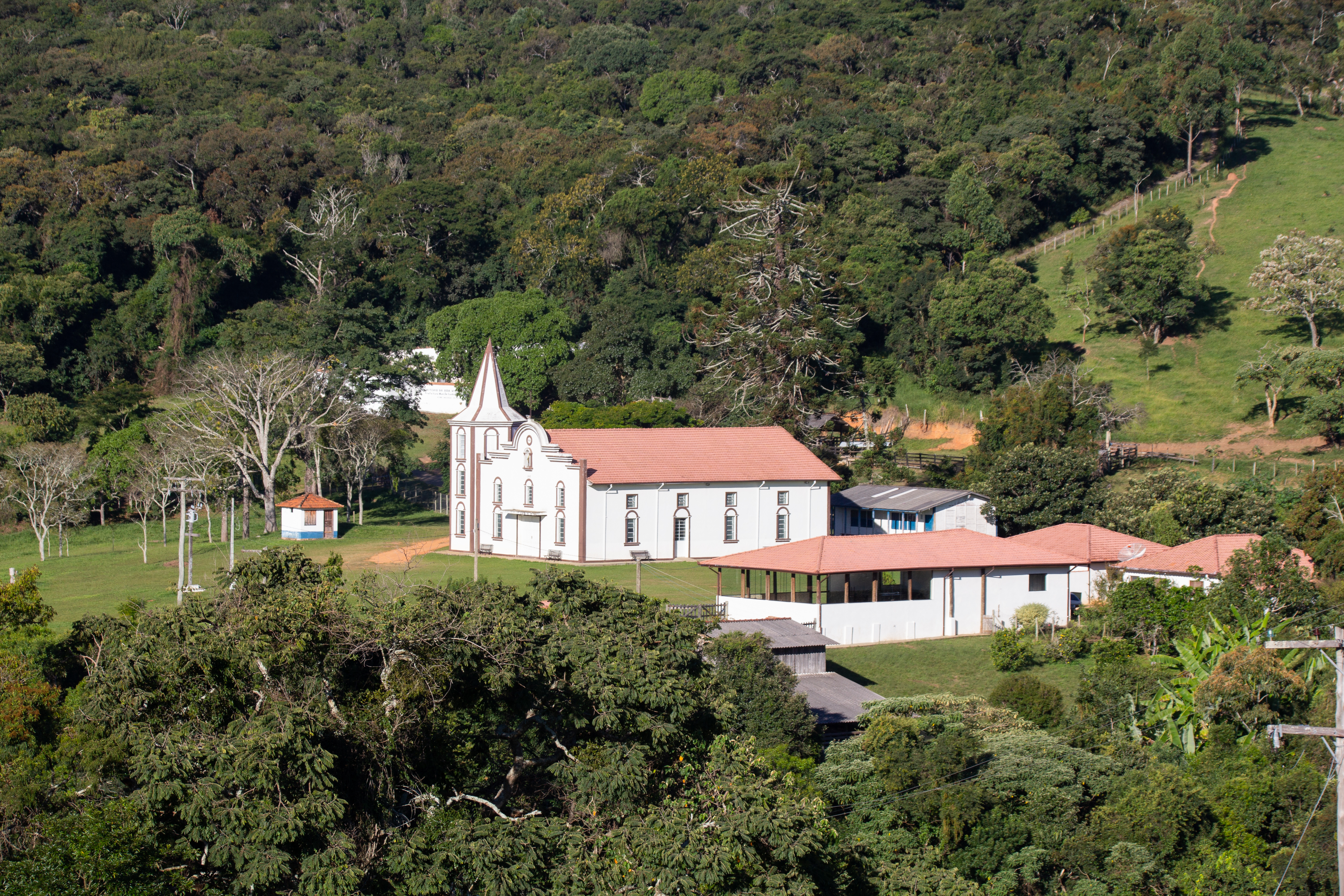
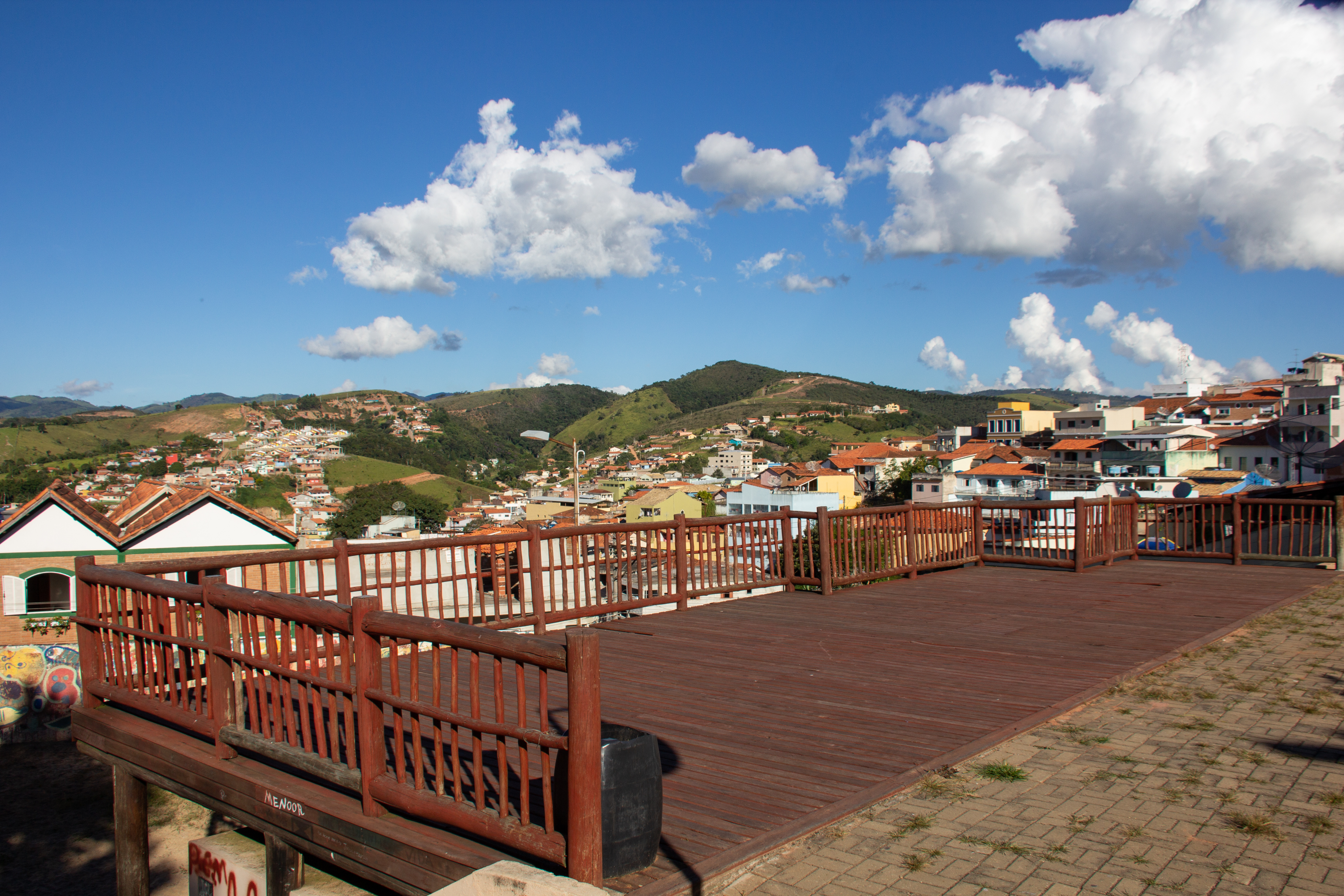
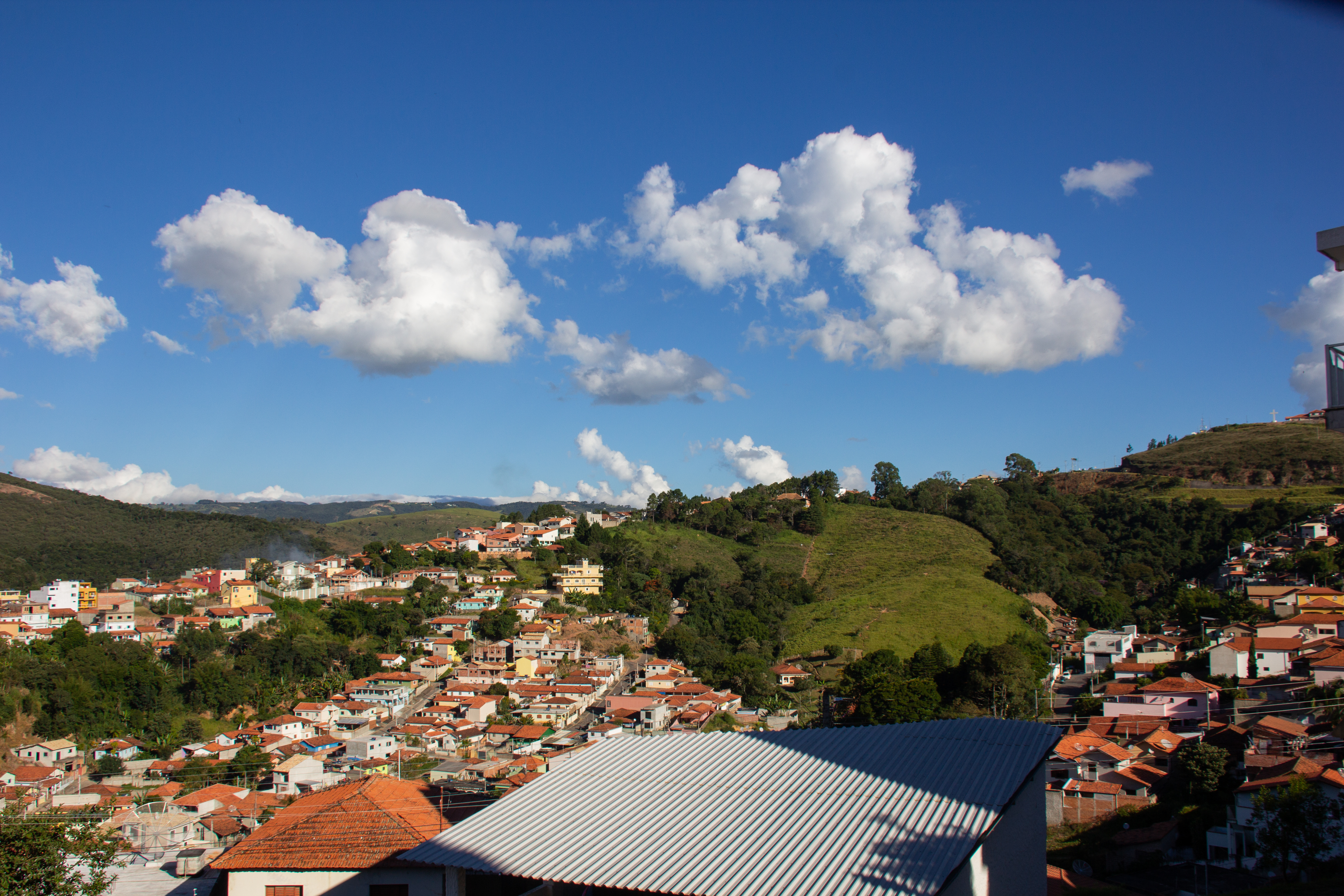
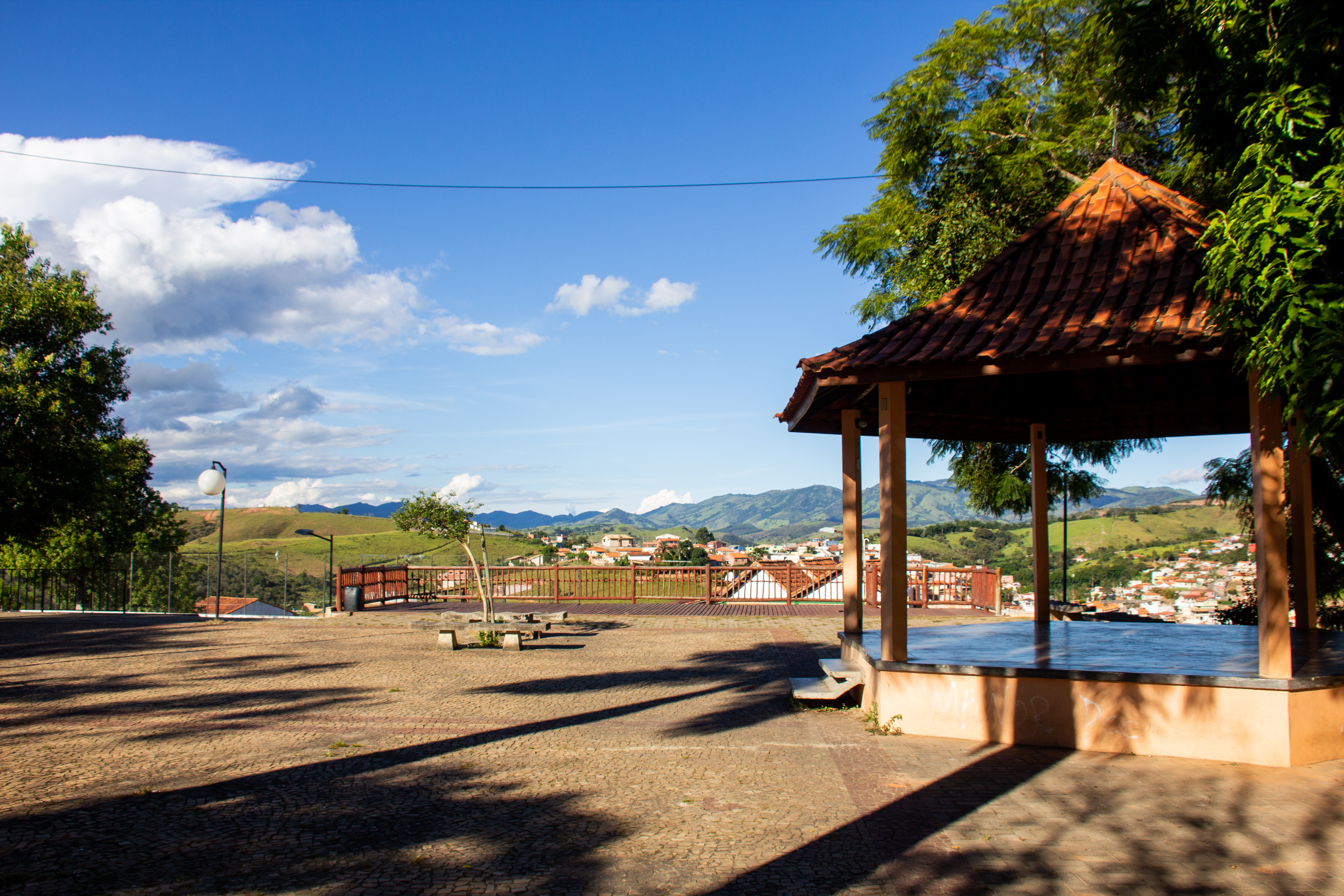

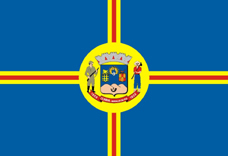
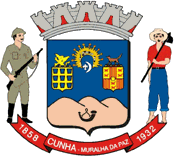
- Flag Coat of arms

- Location in São Paulo
- Coordinates: 23°04′26″S 44°57′36″W
- Country: Brazil
- Region: Southeast
- State: São Paulo
- Founded: 20 April 1858

Government
  - Mayor: Rolien Guarda Garcia (PSB)

Area
  - Total: 1,407.25 km^{2} (543.34 sq mi)
- Elevation: 950 m (3,120 ft)

Population (2020)
  - Total: 21,459
  - Density: 15.249/km^{2} (39.494/sq mi)
- Demonym: cunhense
- Time zone: UTC−3 (BRT)
- HDI (2010): 0.684 – medium
- Website: cunha.sp.gov.br

Cunha is a municipality in the state of São Paulo in Brazil. It is part of the Metropolitan Region of Vale do Paraíba e Litoral Norte. The population is 21,459 (2020 est.) in an area of 1,407.25 km^{2}. The first inhabitants arrived at the beginning of the 18th century. The municipality was founded in 1785 and was elevated to a city in 1858. Since 1975, Cunha has become an important center of stoneware ceramics, with 5 Noborigama wood-fired kilns and 16 ceramics studios. The city is visited for ceramics, a pleasant climate, natural parks and gastronomy. In recent years, tourism to the region has grown, with visitors coming from around the region to enjoy the local state park (Parque Estadual da Serra do Mar), artisan shops such as Aracatu and Oficina da Lã, as well as festivals like the annual lamb festival (Festival do Cordeiro). On October 25, 2015, Cunha hosted the first edition of the Brazilian portion of the Tour de France cycling competition.

Cunha is located on the road connecting Presidente Dutra Highway and Paraty, which is a good place to stop over. Parts of this road were part of Estrada Real, which was used to carry gold and precious gems from Minas Gerais to Paraty port to be exported, which explains the city's historical importance.

== Population history ==
Year	Population
2001	23,090
2003	22,975
2004	22,889
2015	22,086

== Demographics ==
According to the 2000 IBGE Census, the population was 23,090, of which 11,134 or 48.22% are urban and 11,936 (51.69%) are rural. The average life expectancy was 71.69 years, and the fertility rate was 2.41.

== Media ==
In telecommunications, Companhia de Telecomunicações do Estado de São Paulo served the city until 1975, when it began to be served by Telecomunicações de São Paulo. In July 1998, this company was acquired by Telefónica, which adopted the Vivo brand in 2012.

The company is currently an operator of cell phones, fixed lines, internet (fiber optics/4G) and television (satellite and cable).

== Tourist attractions ==
Tourism in Cunha combines natural attractions with the municipality's artistic traditions. The city is known for its artistic ceramics, while Pedra da Macela, local waterfalls and the trails of the Cunha section of Serra do Mar State Park attract visitors interested in hiking, birdwatching and ecotourism. The protected area preserves high-altitude Atlantic Forest and includes routes such as the Rio Bonito, Waterfalls and Rio Paraibuna trails.

=== Historical buildings ===
- Church Nossa Senhora da Conceição (Praça Cônego Siqueira s/n)
- Church Rosário (Praça do Rosário s/n)
- School Dr. Casemiro da Rocha (Rua Dr. Casemiro da Rocha, 205)
- Mercado Municipal (Rua Dom Lino, 118)
- Sobrado à Praça Coronel João Olímpio, 52 (Former City Council and City Hall)

Handcrafts

- Casa do Artesão (Rua Jose Arantes Filho, 27)

=== Falls ===
- Cachoeira da Barra
- Cachoeira do Barracão
- Cachoeira do Desterro
- Cachoeira do Jericó
- Cachoeira do Mato Limpo
- Cachoeira do Pimenta
- Cachoeira do Paraibuna
- Cachoeira do Paraitinga

Some of these are falls which you can swim in.

=== Overlook point ===
- Pedra da Macela (where it is possible to see all the sea between Ubatuba and Angra dos Reis)

== See also ==
- List of municipalities in São Paulo
