= Hypersthene =

Enstatite var., belonging to the group of orthorhombic pyroxenes

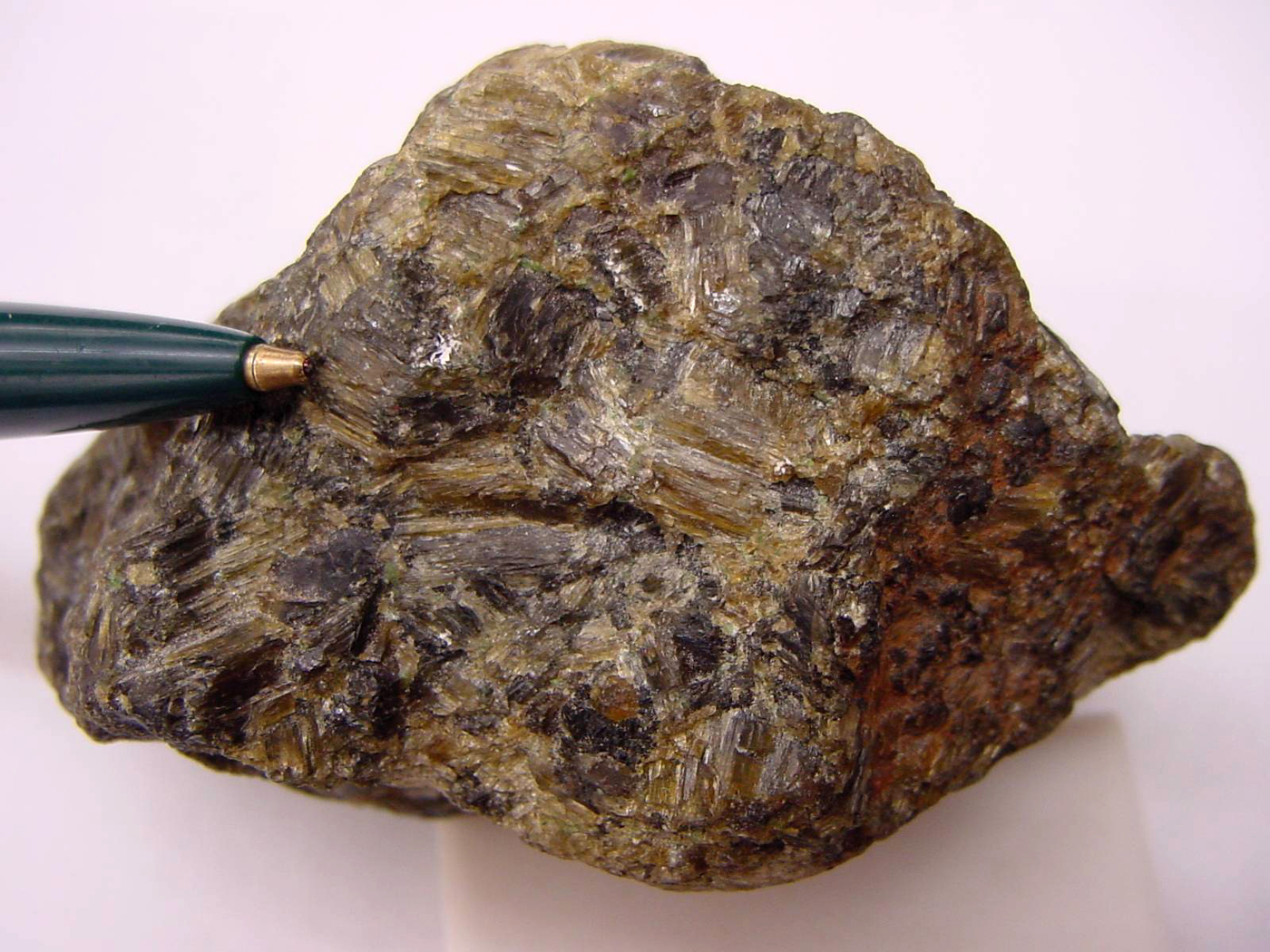

General
- Category: Inosilicate
- Formula: (Mg,Fe)SiO_{3}
- Strunz classification: 8/F.02-20
- Crystal system: Orthorhombic

Identification
- Color: Gray, brown, or green
- Twinning: On [100]
- Cleavage: {100} Perfect, {010} Perfect
- Fracture: Uneven
- Mohs scale hardness: 5.5–6
- Luster: Vitreous to pearly
- Streak: Greyish white, greenish
- Specific gravity: 3.4–3.9
- Optical properties: Biaxial (−)
- Refractive index: n_{α} = 1.669 – 1.755 n_{β} = 1.674 – 1.763 n_{γ} = 1.680 – 1.773
- Birefringence: δ = 0.011 – 0.018
- Dispersion: Weak

Hypersthene is a common rock-forming inosilicate mineral belonging to the group of Monoclinic pyroxenes. Its chemical formula is (Mg,Fe)SiO_{3}. It is found in igneous and some metamorphic rocks as well as in stony and iron meteorites. Many references have formally abandoned this term, preferring to categorise this mineral as enstatite or ferrosilite. It forms a solid solution series with the minerals enstatite and ferrosilite, being a mid-way member between the two. Pure enstatite contains no iron, while pure ferrosilite contains no magnesium; hypersthene is the name given to the mineral when a significant amount of both elements are present. Enstatite is stable at atmospheric pressure, but ferrosilite is stable only at elevated pressure, decomposing into quartz and fayalite at atmospheric pressure unless stabilized by magnesium or other impurities.

Distinctly developed crystals are rare, the mineral being usually found as foliated masses embedded in the igneous rocks norite and hypersthene-andesite, of which it forms an essential constituent. The coarse-grained labradorite-hypersthene-rock (norite) of Paul's Island off the coast of Labrador has furnished the most typical material; for this reason, the mineral has been known as Labrador hornblende or paulite.

Color is often gray, brown, or green, and the luster is usually vitreous to pearly. The pleochroism is strong, the hardness is 5–6, and the specific gravity is 3.4–3.9. On certain surfaces it displays a brilliant copper-red metallic sheen, or schiller, which has the same origin as the bronzy sheen of bronzite, but is even more pronounced. Like bronzite, it is sometimes cut and polished as a gemstone.

The name "hypersthene" comes from the Greek and means "over strength", and is an allusion to its being harder than the amphibole mineral hornblende (a mineral with which it is often confused.

Hypersthene has been discredited by the International Mineralogical Association and is no longer considered a valid mineral type; specimens labelled as hypersthene are usually ferroan enstatite.
