= Águia Branca =

- Municipality
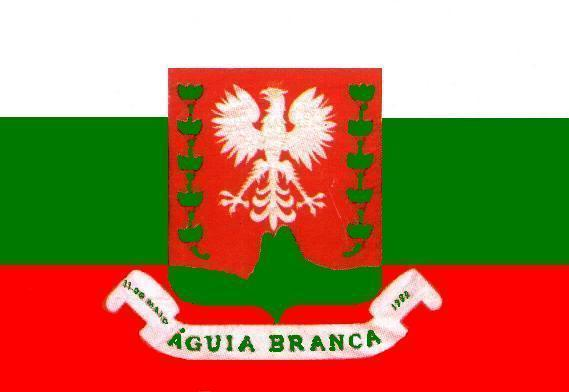
- Flag Coat of arms

- Location in Espírito Santo state

- Location in Brazil
- Coordinates: 18°58′58″S 40°44′24″W
- Country: Brazil
- Region: Southeast
- State: Espírito Santo

Area
  - Total: 454 km^{2} (175 sq mi)

Population (2020)
  - Total: 9,631
  - Density: 21.2/km^{2} (54.9/sq mi)
- Time zone: UTC−3 (BRT)

Águia Branca ("white eagle" in English) is a municipality located in the west-central portion of the state of Espírito Santo, in southeastern Brazil. The municipality has a population of 9,631 (2020) and its area is 454 km^{2}.

== History ==
It was first colonized by Polish immigrants, in 1928. Polish was widely spoken in the region till the Second World War, when the Brazilian government prohibited education in Polish and German.

== Geography ==
Located 226 km from the state capital Vitória. Municipalities it shares borders with include: (west) Mantenópolis and Pancas. (north) Barra de São Francisco and Nova Venécia. (south) São Domingos do Norte. (east) São Gabriel da Palha.

The municipality is in a markedly mountainous region of the state, and Águia Branca town looks up at great finger shaped stone peaks which surround the area. Municipal maximum height is at 878m above sea level.
