= Emanuela Pedroso =

Brazilian politician (born 1983)

Member-elect of the Chamber of Deputies
- Assuming office 1 February 2027
- Constituency: Espírito Santo

Personal details
- Born: Maria Emanuela Alves Pedroso; 24 October 1983 (age 43) Alto Rio Novo, Espírito Santo, Brazil
- Party: PSB
- Profession: Lawyer

Maria Emanuela Alves Pedroso (born 24 October 1983) is a Brazilian politician who was elected member of the Chamber of Deputies in 2026. From 2023 to 2026, she served as secretary of government of Espírito Santo. From 2013 to 2016, she served as mayor of Alto Rio Novo.
