= Água Doce do Norte =

- Municipality
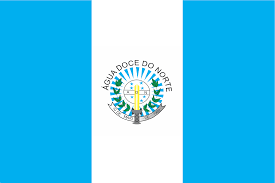
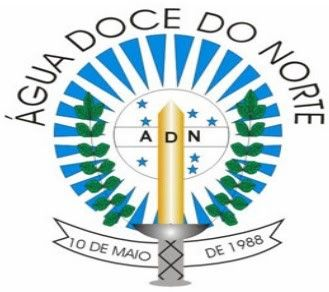
- Flag Coat of arms

- Location in Brazil
- Coordinates: 18°32′47″S 40°58′58″W
- Country: Brazil
- Region: Southeast
- State: Espírito Santo

Area
  - Total: 474 km^{2} (183 sq mi)

Population (2020)
  - Total: 10,909
  - Density: 23.0/km^{2} (59.6/sq mi)
- Time zone: UTC−3 (BRT)

Água Doce do Norte is a municipality located in the Brazilian state of Espírito Santo. Its population was 10,909 (2020) and its area is 474 km^{2}. The municipal capital is situated at a height of 200m above sea level. Those born in Água Doce do Norte are called Agua-docences.

== Overview ==
The municipality is currently made up of five districts: Água Doce do Norte, Governador Lacerda de Aguiar, Santa Luzia do Azul, Santo Agostinho and Vila Nelita. The territorial area of Água Doce do Norte was donated by a local farmer named Domingos Marculino to the local population in 1949. In line with popular demand, Domingos Marculino lent his name to the original town. But its current name prevailed after a tradition of those inhabitants of making such a weak coffee as to its taste resembling fresh water more than coffee (fresh water being the translation of "Água Doce"). The original village of Água Doce do Norte, which was then part of the municipality of Barra de São Francisco, was founded on 11 October 1949, then soon receiving the status of district in 1951. The locality then was mostly geared towards the production of coffee and the rapid growth it experienced then was because then was the golden age of coffee in Brazil. On 6 May 1988 by the law nº 4066, the municipality was separated from that of Barra de São Francisco. It was then officially installed on 1 January 1989. The official change of name from Água Doce to Água Doce do Norte was made in 1988.
