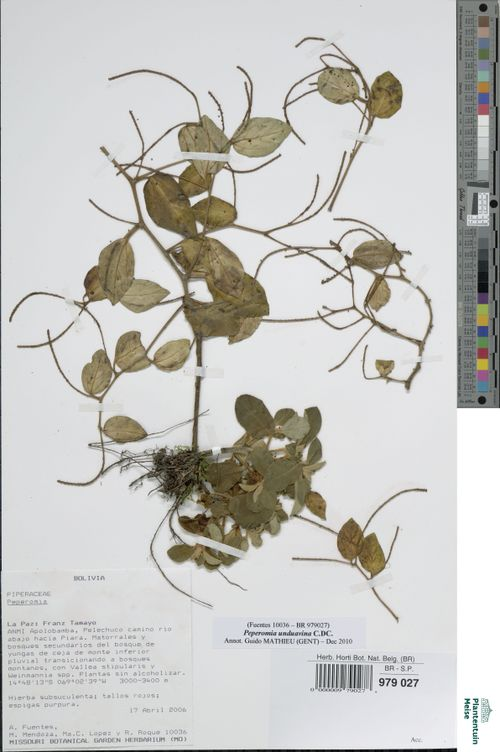

Scientific classification
- Kingdom: Plantae
- Clade: Embryophytes
- Clade: Tracheophytes
- Clade: Angiosperms
- Clade: Magnoliids
- Order: Piperales
- Family: Piperaceae
- Genus: Peperomia
- Species: P. unduavina

Binomial name
- Peperomia unduavina C.DC.

Synonyms
- Peperomia suboppositifolia Yunck.

= Peperomia unduavina =

Species of flowering plant

Peperomia unduavina is a species of plant from the genus Peperomia. It was first described by Casimir de Candolle and published in the book "Repertorium Specierum Novarum Regni Vegetabilis 13: 306. 1914.". It primarily grows on wet tropical biomes It is named after Unduavi, the place where the species were discovered.

== Distribution ==
It is endemic to Bolivia and Brazil. First specimens where found at an altitude of 3300 meters in Unduavi, Bolivia.

- Bolivia
  - La Paz
    - Franz Tamayo
    - Bautista Saavedra
    - Nor Yungas
      - Unduavi
  - Cochabamba
    - Carrasco
  - Chuquisaca
    - Belisario Boeto
  - Santa Cruz
    - Manuel Maria Caballero
- Brazil
  - Minas Gerais
    - Espera Feliz
    - Teófilo Otoni
  - Espírito Santo
    - Itaguaçu

== Description ==
Dense hair on the stem and branches; opposite leaves short-petiolate, with rounded tips and ovate bases of the limbs; glabrous spikes subequal to subdensiflorous limbs; bracts peltate round in the centre pedicellate; anthers rounded equal to flagella; ovary emerging ovate scattered with glands a little below the obtuse tip bearing a glabrous orbicular fleshy stigma.

2 mm thick callus in the dry subplanatus. Legs: whitish membranous, top limbs up to 2 cm long and 1.4 cm wide, minutely transparent-punctate when dry. 3 mm petiole and 7 mm long peduncle. Pale, 1 mm thick dry spikes with a 0.5 mm diameter pelt plate.
