= Itaguaçu =

Itaguaçu Município de Itaguaçu
- Municipality
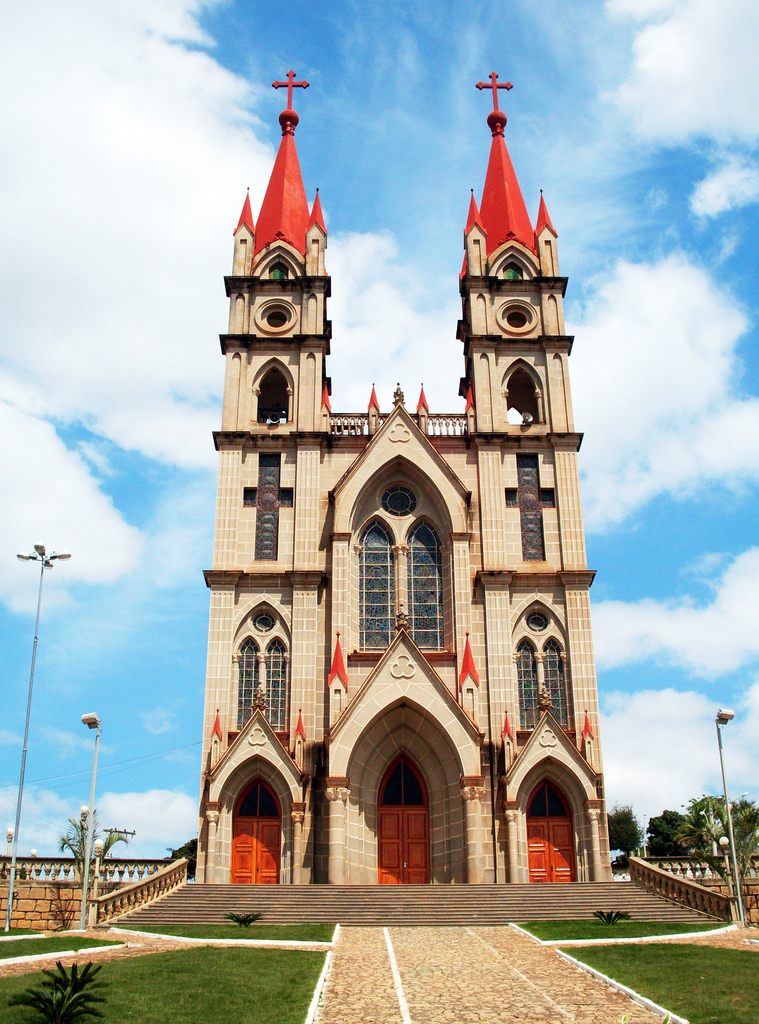
- Church at Itaguaçu, ES, Brazil.jpg

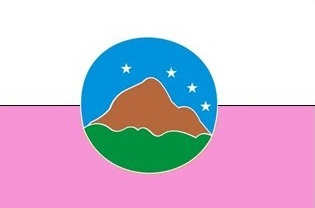
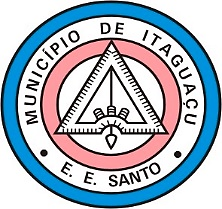
- Flag Coat of arms

- Location of Itaguaçu in Espírito Santo

- Location of Itaguaçu in Brazil
- Coordinates: 18°48′S 40°51′W
- Country: Brazil
- Region: Northeast
- State: Espírito Santo
- Founded: February 17, 1915

Government
  - Mayor: Darly Dettmann

Area
  - Total: 532 km^{2} (205 sq mi)
- Elevation: 150 m (490 ft)

Population (2020)
  - Total: 14,023
  - Density: 26.4/km^{2} (68.3/sq mi)
- Demonym: Itaguaçuense
- Time zone: UTC-3 (BRT)
- Website: itaguacu.es.gov.br

Itaguaçu is a municipality located in the Brazilian state of Espírito Santo. Its population was 14,023 (2020) and its area is 532 square kilometres (205 mi^{2}). Itaguaçu has a population density of 26.6 per square kilometer. Itaguaçu has three districts: Itaimbé, Palmeira and Itaçu.

== Origin of the name ==
The name of the municipality is of Tupi origin: ita, meaning "rock", and guaçu, meaning "large".

== Geography ==
Itaguaçu is characterized by several rocky peaks, including Pedra Paulista at 600 metres (2,000 ft), Pico do Caparaó at 850 metres (2,790 ft), Pedra do Barro Preto, the symbol of the municipality, and several others. Several waterfalls dot the town, notably the Cachoeira do Christófari. Itaguaçu borders the municipalities of Baixo Guandu to the northeast, Colatina to the north, São Roque do Canaã to the east, Itarana to the south, Laranja da Terra to the southeast, and Santa Teresa to the southeast.

== History ==
Itaguaçu was first colonized in the second half of the 14th century by Francisco da Silva Coutinho, Antônio Gonçalves Ferreira, Major José Vieira de Carvalho and José Teodoro de Andrade. The first settlement was on the Santa Joana River, and also called Santa Joana. It was later known as Boa Família and finally as Itaguaçu.

A later wave of settlement came with the Italian immigration to Brazil of the late 19th century. Several families from San Cassiano de Treviso in the Italian province of Treviso. They worked for another native of Treviso in Santa Catarina for three years before twelve families moved to Boa Família in 1882.

== Noted places ==
The Church of Matriz Nossa Senhora Medianeira de todas as Graças was built in the seat of the municipality in 1953. It was built in the Gothic Revival style with twin spires that rise to 48 metres (157 ft). The Lutheran Church of Palmeira de Santa Joana (Templo de Palmeira de Santa Joana), located in the Palmeira district, was built in 1902. It is built in a style typical of Lutheran churches in the region with one tower and three bells.
