= Piuma =

Piuma may refer to:

- Danieli Piuma, motor glider
- Piúma, a municipality located in the Brazilian state of Espírito Santo
- Piuma (film), a 2016 Italian film
