= List of municipalities in Espírito Santo =

Municipalities of Espírito Santo

This is a list of the municipalities in the state of Espírito Santo (ES), located in the Southeast Region of Brazil. Espírito Santo is divided into 78 municipalities, which are grouped into 13 microregions, which are grouped into 4 mesoregions.

Municipalities of Espirito Santo

Mesoregion	Microregion	#	Municipality	Population (2022)	Area (km²)
Central Espirito-Santense	Afonso Cláudio	1	Afonso Cláudio	30,684	941
Central Espirito-Santense	Afonso Cláudio	15	Brejetuba	12,982	354
Central Espirito-Santense	Afonso Cláudio	21	Conceição do Castelo	11,937	369
Central Espirito-Santense	Afonso Cláudio	23	Domingos Martins	35,416	1229
Central Espirito-Santense	Afonso Cláudio	41	Laranja da Terra	11,094	458
Central Espirito-Santense	Afonso Cláudio	45	Marechal Floriano	17,641	285
Central Espirito-Santense	Afonso Cláudio	72	Venda Nova do Imigrante	23,831	185
Central Espirito-Santense	Guarapari	5	Alfredo Chaves	13,836	615
Central Espirito-Santense	Guarapari	7	Anchieta	29,984	409
Central Espirito-Santense	Guarapari	28	Guarapari	124,656	589
Central Espirito-Santense	Guarapari	32	Iconha	12,326	203
Central Espirito-Santense	Guarapari	56	Piúma	22,300	74
Central Espirito-Santense	Guarapari	60	Rio Novo do Sul	11,069	204
Central Espirito-Santense	Santa Teresa	34	Itaguaçu	13,589	535
Central Espirito-Santense	Santa Teresa	36	Itarana	10,597	295
Central Espirito-Santense	Santa Teresa	61	Santa Leopoldina	13,106	718
Central Espirito-Santense	Santa Teresa	62	Santa Maria do Jetibá	41,636	735
Central Espirito-Santense	Santa Teresa	63	Santa Teresa	22,808	683
Central Espirito-Santense	Santa Teresa	68	São Roque do Canaã	10,886	341
Central Espirito-Santense	Vitória	17	Cariacica	353,491	279
Central Espirito-Santense	Vitória	69	Serra	520,653	547
Central Espirito-Santense	Vitória	73	Viana	73,423	312
Central Espirito-Santense	Vitória	76	Vila Velha	467,722	210
Central Espirito-Santense	Vitória	77	Vitória (State Capital)	322,869	97
Litoral Norte Espirito-Santense	Linhares	9	Aracruz	94,765	1420
Litoral Norte Espirito-Santense	Linhares	26	Fundão	18,014	286
Litoral Norte Espirito-Santense	Linhares	30	Ibiraçu	11,723	201
Litoral Norte Espirito-Santense	Linhares	40	João Neiva	14,079	284
Litoral Norte Espirito-Santense	Linhares	42	Linhares	166,786	3496
Litoral Norte Espirito-Santense	Linhares	59	Rio Bananal	19,274	641
Litoral Norte Espirito-Santense	Linhares	70	Sooretama	26,502	587
Litoral Norte Espirito-Santense	Montanha	48	Montanha	18,900	1099
Litoral Norte Espirito-Santense	Montanha	49	Mucurici	5,466	540
Litoral Norte Espirito-Santense	Montanha	55	Pinheiros	23,915	973
Litoral Norte Espirito-Santense	Montanha	57	Ponto Belo	6,497	360
Litoral Norte Espirito-Santense	São Mateus	20	Conceição da Barra	27,458	1182
Litoral Norte Espirito-Santense	São Mateus	38	Jaguaré	28,931	659
Litoral Norte Espirito-Santense	São Mateus	54	Pedro Canário	21,522	433
Litoral Norte Espirito-Santense	São Mateus	67	São Mateus	123,752	2346
Noroeste Espirito-Santense	Barra de São Francisco	2	Água Doce do Norte	12,042	473
Noroeste Espirito-Santense	Barra de São Francisco	12	Barra de São Francisco	42,498	944
Noroeste Espirito-Santense	Barra de São Francisco	25	Ecoporanga	21,992	2285
Noroeste Espirito-Santense	Barra de São Francisco	43	Mantenópolis	12,770	321
Noroeste Espirito-Santense	Colatina	6	Alto Rio Novo	7,434	227
Noroeste Espirito-Santense	Colatina	11	Baixo Guandu	30,674	909
Noroeste Espirito-Santense	Colatina	19	Colatina	120,033	1398
Noroeste Espirito-Santense	Colatina	19	Governador Lindenberg	11,009	360
Noroeste Espirito-Santense	Colatina	46	Marilândia	12,387	327
Noroeste Espirito-Santense	Colatina	53	Pancas	18,893	837
Noroeste Espirito-Santense	Colatina	64	São Domingos do Norte	8,589	298
Noroeste Espirito-Santense	Nova Venécia	3	Águia Branca	9,711	454
Noroeste Espirito-Santense	Nova Venécia	13	Boa Esperança	13,608	428
Noroeste Espirito-Santense	Nova Venécia	52	Nova Venécia	49,065	1439
Noroeste Espirito-Santense	Nova Venécia	65	São Gabriel da Palha	32,252	434
Noroeste Espirito-Santense	Nova Venécia	74	Vila Pavão	8,911	433
Noroeste Espirito-Santense	Nova Venécia	75	Vila Valério	13,728	470
Sul Espirito-Santense	Alegre	4	Alegre	29,177	756
Sul Espirito-Santense	Alegre	22	Divino de São Lourenço	5,083	174
Sul Espirito-Santense	Alegre	24	Dores do Rio Preto	6,596	159
Sul Espirito-Santense	Alegre	27	Guaçuí	29,358	468
Sul Espirito-Santense	Alegre	29	Ibatiba	25,380	240
Sul Espirito-Santense	Alegre	31	Ibitirama	9,520	330
Sul Espirito-Santense	Alegre	33	Irupi	13,710	184
Sul Espirito-Santense	Alegre	37	Iúna	28,590	460
Sul Espirito-Santense	Alegre	50	Muniz Freire	18,153	678
Sul Espirito-Santense	Cachoeiro de Itapemirim	8	Apiacá	7,223	193
Sul Espirito-Santense	Cachoeiro de Itapemirim	10	Atílio Vivacqua	10,540	232
Sul Espirito-Santense	Cachoeiro de Itapemirim	14	Bom Jesus do Norte	10,254	89
Sul Espirito-Santense	Cachoeiro de Itapemirim	16	Cachoeiro de Itapemirim	185,786	864
Sul Espirito-Santense	Cachoeiro de Itapemirim	18	Castelo	36,930	663
Sul Espirito-Santense	Cachoeiro de Itapemirim	39	Jerônimo Monteiro	11,575	177
Sul Espirito-Santense	Cachoeiro de Itapemirim	47	Mimoso do Sul	24,475	869
Sul Espirito-Santense	Cachoeiro de Itapemirim	51	Muqui	13,745	327
Sul Espirito-Santense	Cachoeiro de Itapemirim	66	São José do Calçado	10,878	273
Sul Espirito-Santense	Cachoeiro de Itapemirim	71	Vargem Alta	19,563	417
Sul Espirito-Santense	Itapemirim	35	Itapemirim	39,832	550
Sul Espirito-Santense	Itapemirim	44	Marataízes	41,929	130
Sul Espirito-Santense	Itapemirim	58	Presidente Kennedy	13,696	594

== See also ==
- Geography of Brazil
- List of cities in Brazil
