= Pedro Canário =

- Municipality of Espírito Santo, Brazil
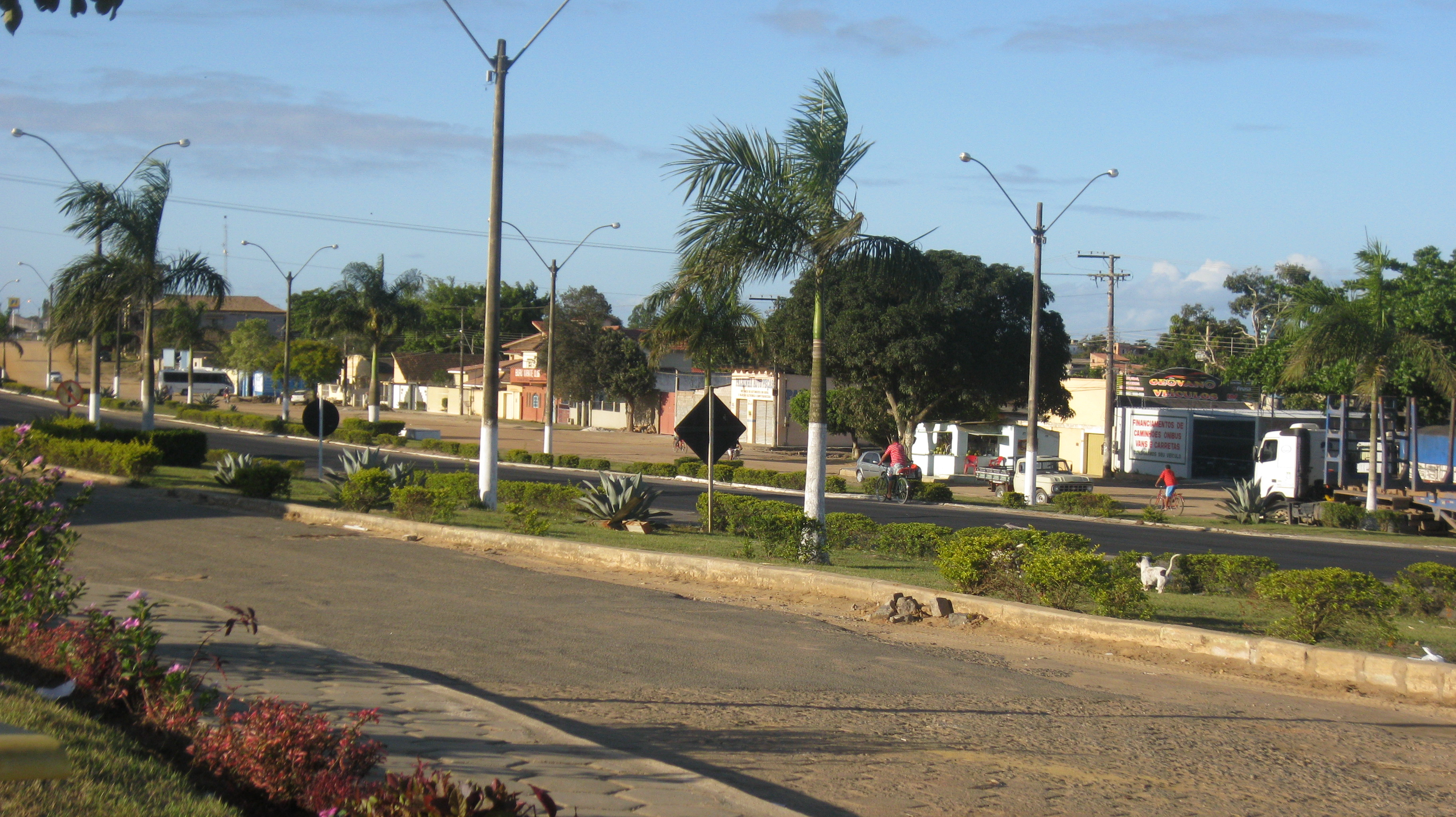
- Pedro Canário

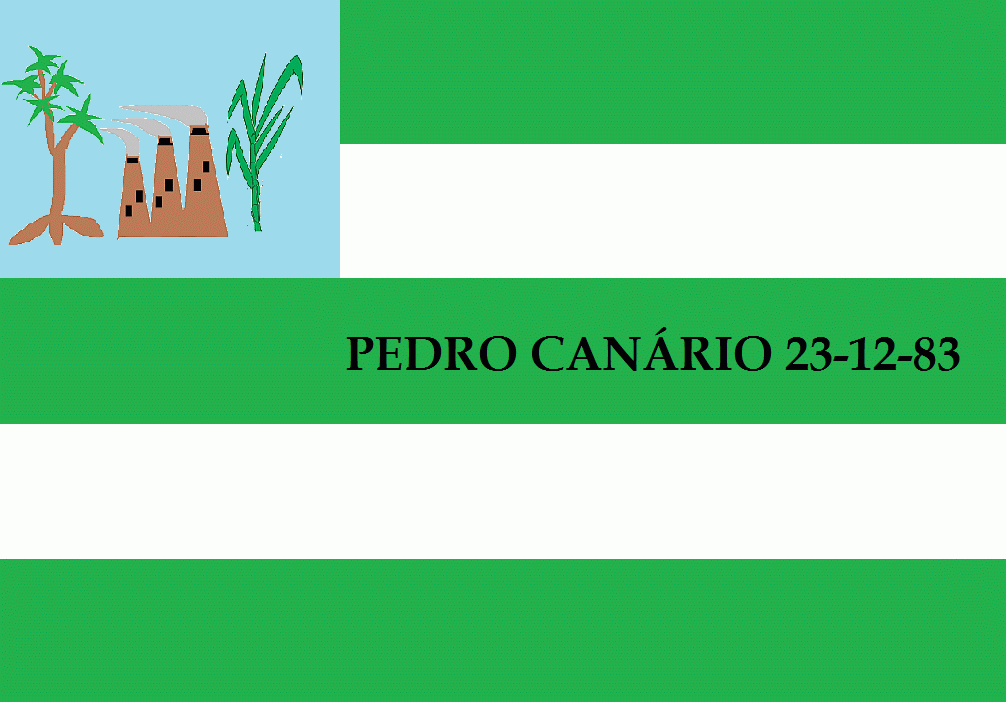
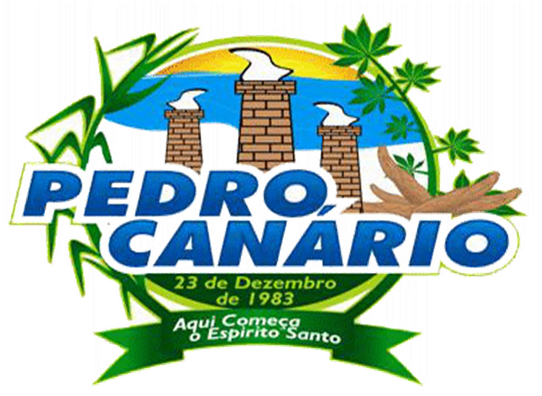
- Flag Coat of arms
- Etymology: Named after a boarding house and store owned by Pedro Canário Ribeiro
- Location of Pedro Canário in Espírito Santo

- Location within Brazil Location within South America
- Coordinates: 18°18′0″S 39°57′0″W
- Country: Brazil
- Region: Southeast
- State: Espírito Santo
- Founded: 23 December 1983

Government
  - Mayor: Kleilson Martins Rezende (PSB) (2025-2028)
  - Vice Mayor: Denis Pereira Amancio (Republicanos) (2025-2028)

Area
  - Total: 433.453 km^{2} (167.357 sq mi)
- Elevation: 115 m (377 ft)

Population (2022)
  - Total: 21,522
  - Density: 49.65/km^{2} (128.6/sq mi)
- Demonym: Canariense (Brazilian Portuguese)
- Time zone: UTC-03:00 (Brasília Time)
- Postal code: 29970-000, 29978-000
- HDI (2010): 0.654 – medium
- Website: pedrocanario.es.gov.br

Pedro Canário is a municipality located in the Brazilian state of Espírito Santo. Its population was 26,381 (2020) and its area is 434 km^{2}.

== See also ==
- List of municipalities in Espírito Santo
