= Mucurici =

- Municipality
- The Municipality of Mucurici
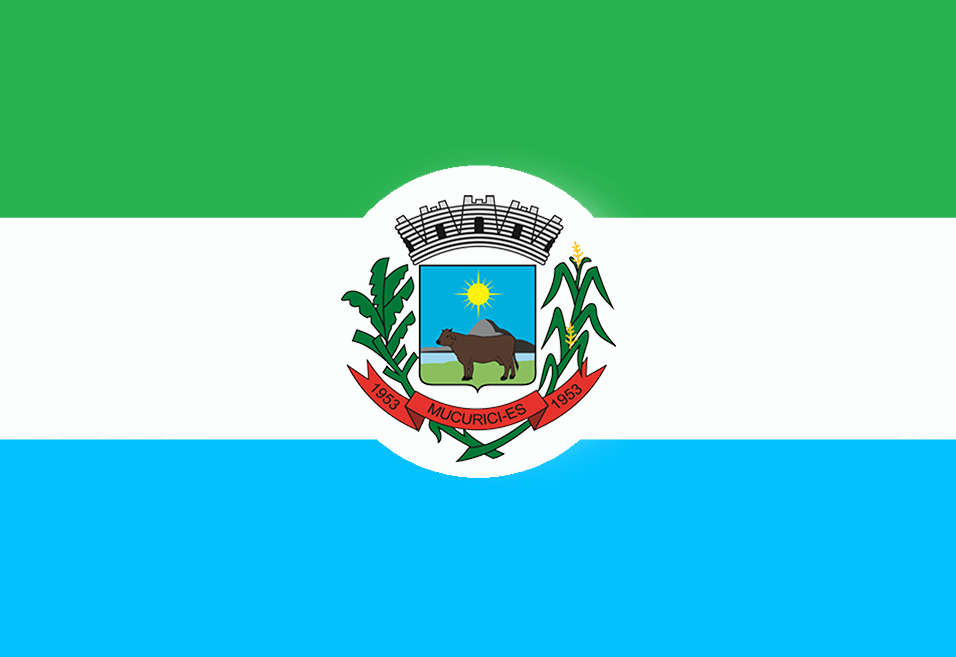
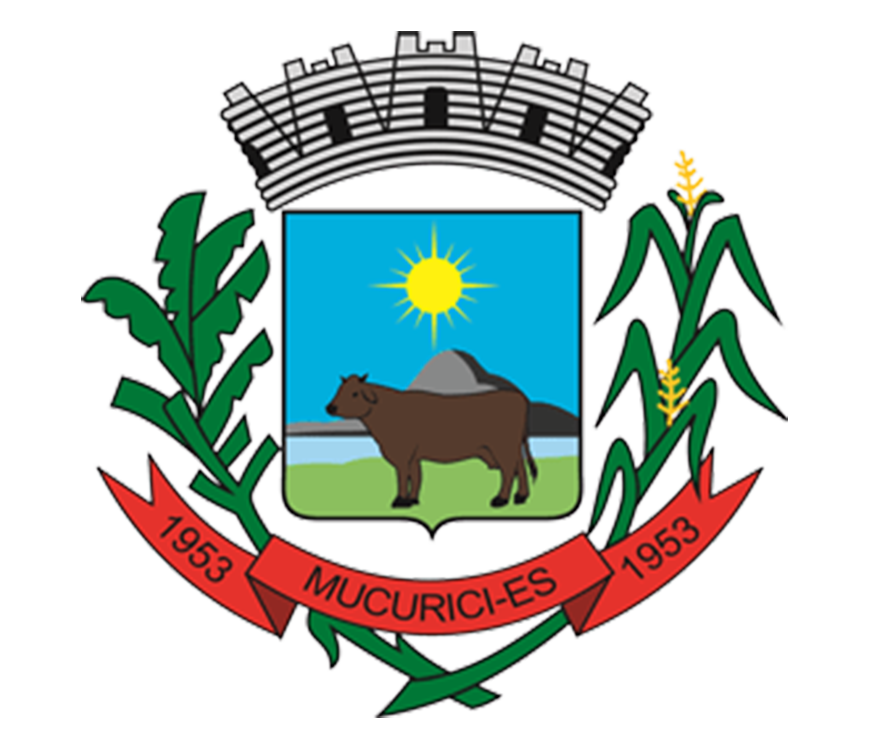
- Flag Coat of arms
- Motto: "Ação e desenvolvimento" (Action and development)
- Location in the State of Espírito Santo
- Coordinates: 18°05′34″S 40°30′57″W
- Country: Brazil
- Region: Southeast
- State: Espírito Santo
- Founded: December 11, 1953

Government
  - Mayor: Atanael Passos Wagmacker (PMDB)

Area
  - Total: 537.711 km^{2} (207.611 sq mi)

Population (2020)
  - Total: 5,496
  - Density: 11.6/km^{2} (30/sq mi)
- Time zone: UTC−3 (BRT)
- HDI (2000): 0.679 – medium

Mucurici is the northernmost municipality in the Brazilian state of Espírito Santo. Its population was 5,496 (2020) and its area is 537.711 km^{2} (207.611 sq mi).
