= Governador Lindenberg =

Municipality of Espírito Santo, Brazil

- Municipality of Espírito Santo, Brazil
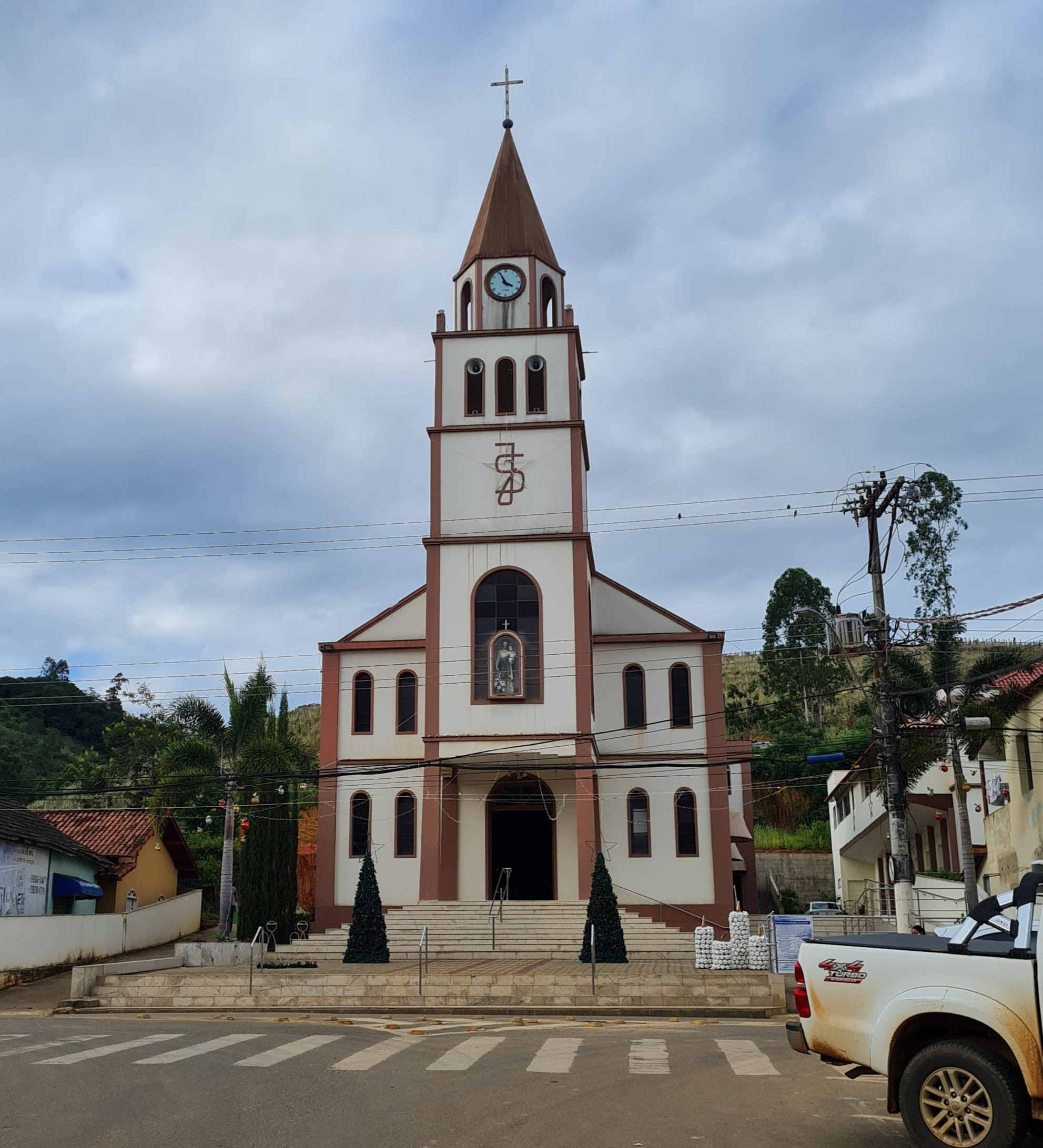
- Church of Saint Joseph in Governador Lindenberg

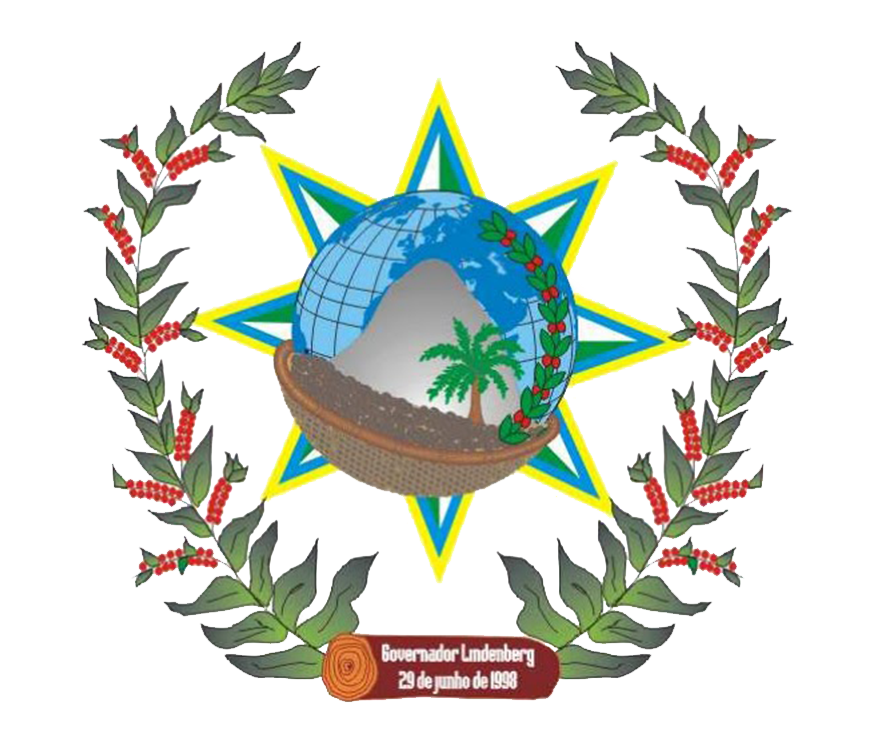
- Flag Coat of arms
- Etymology: Named after Carlos Lindenberg, former governor of Espírito Santo
- Location of Governador Lindenberg in Espírito Santo

- Location within Brazil Location within South America
- Coordinates: 19°15′7″S 40°27′39″W
- Country: Brazil
- Region: Southeast
- State: Espírito Santo
- Founded: 11 May 1998

Government
  - Mayor: Leonardo Prando Finco (PP) (2025-2028)
  - Vice Mayor: Tadeu de Sousa (PODE) (2025-2028)

Area
  - Total: 360.016 km^{2} (139.003 sq mi)
- Elevation: 150 m (490 ft)

Population (2022)
  - Total: 11,009
  - Density: 30.58/km^{2} (79.2/sq mi)
- Demonym: Lindenberguense (Brazilian Portuguese)
- Time zone: UTC-03:00 (Brasília Time)
- Postal code: 29720-000, 29723-000, 29724-000
- HDI (2010): 0.694 – medium
- Website: governadorlindenberg.es.gov.br

Governador Lindenberg is the name of a Brazilian municipality in the southeastern state of Espírito Santo. Its population was 12,880 (2020) and its area is 360 km^{2} (140 sq mi).

As of 2001, an official flag was adopted, and the coat of arms designed by Andreia Freitas dos Santos won a school competition to choose the city's coat of arms, in which the prize was a television.

Located in the north of the state, roughly 200km from the capital of Vitória, this municipality gained independence from Colatina on 29 July 1997. Its colonization was made primarily through the access of the Doce River, by Italian immigrants, who settled there during the 19th century.

== Gallery ==
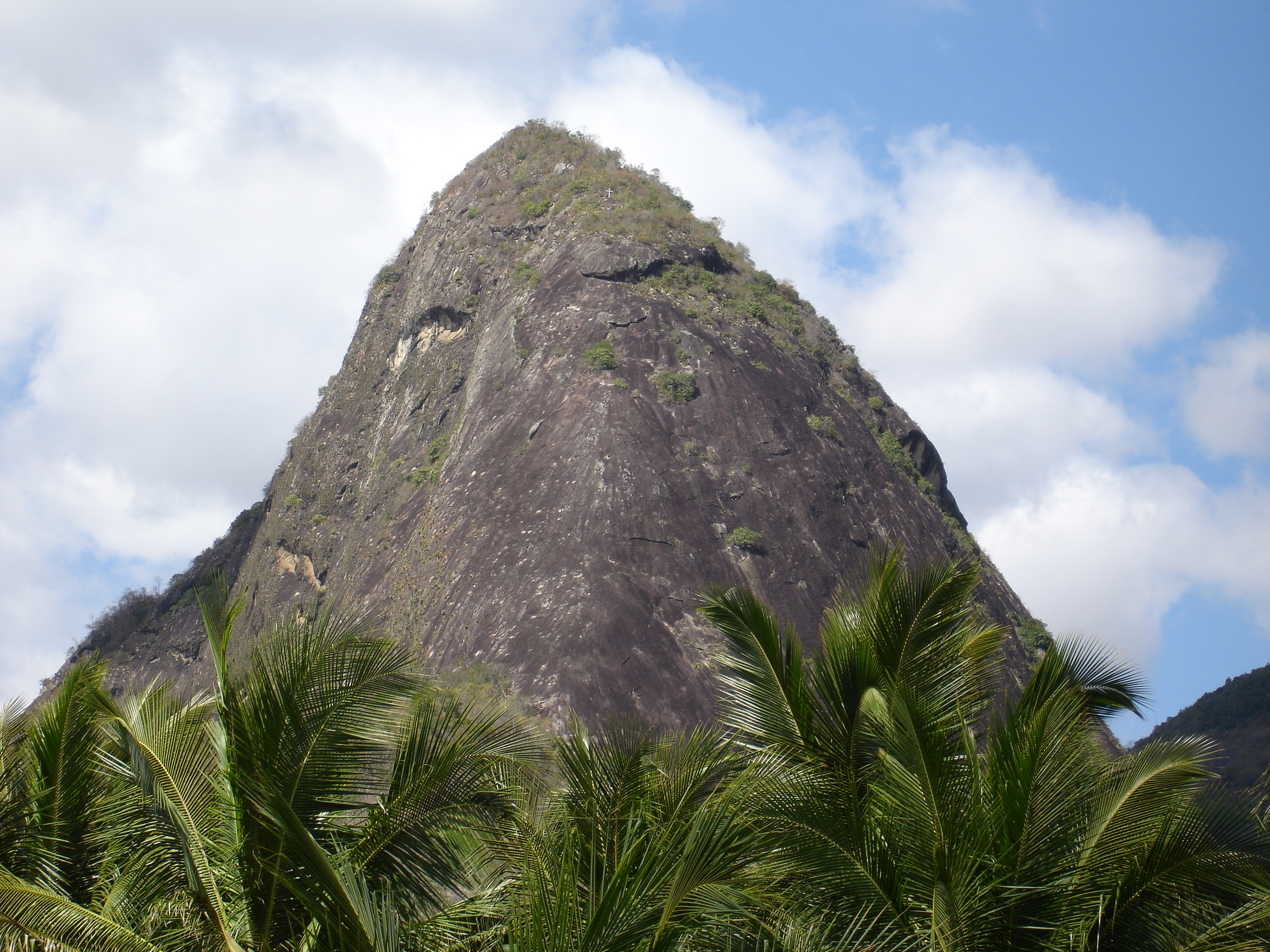
Rock of Santa Rosa

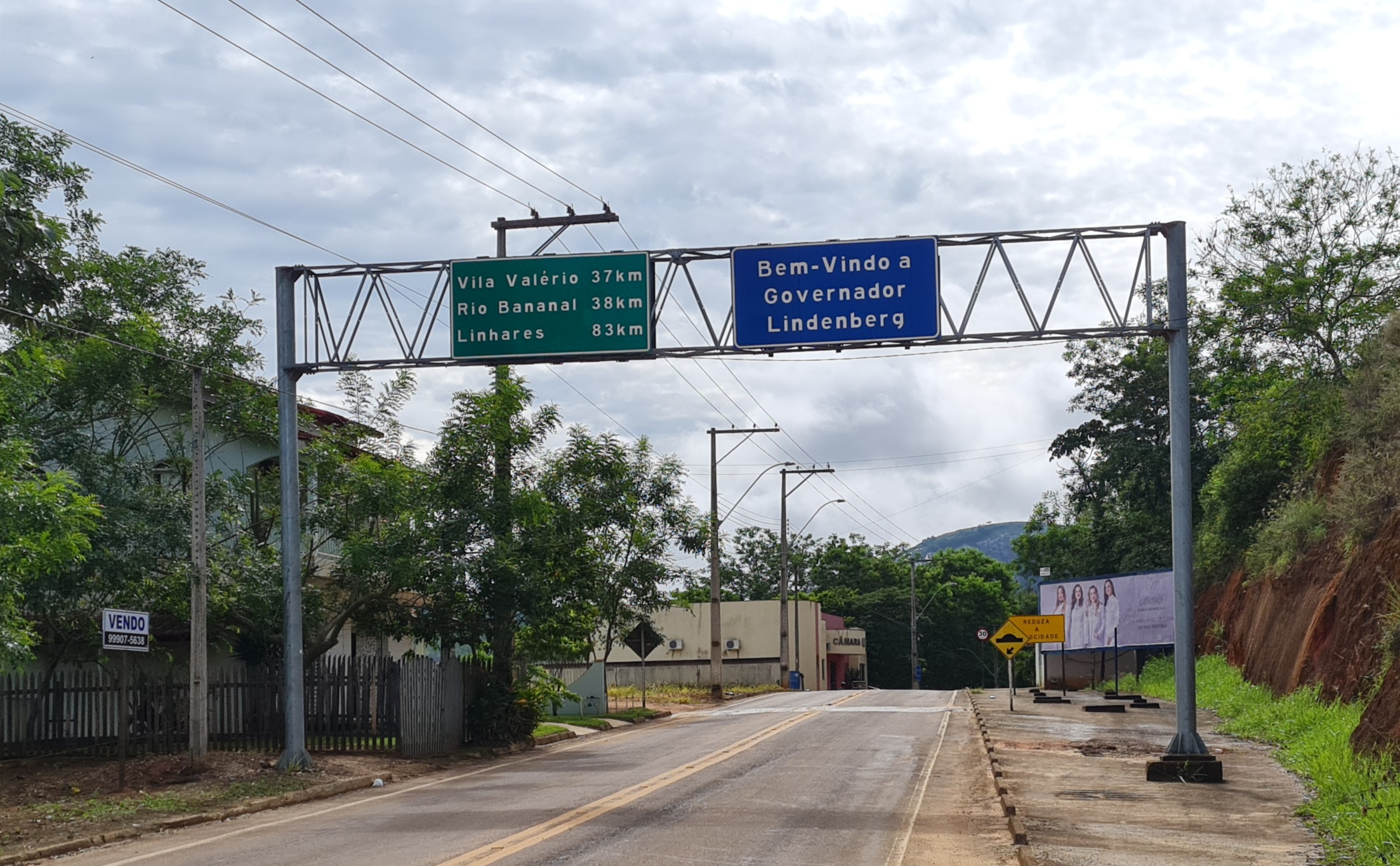
Entrance to Governador Lindenberg on highway ES-245

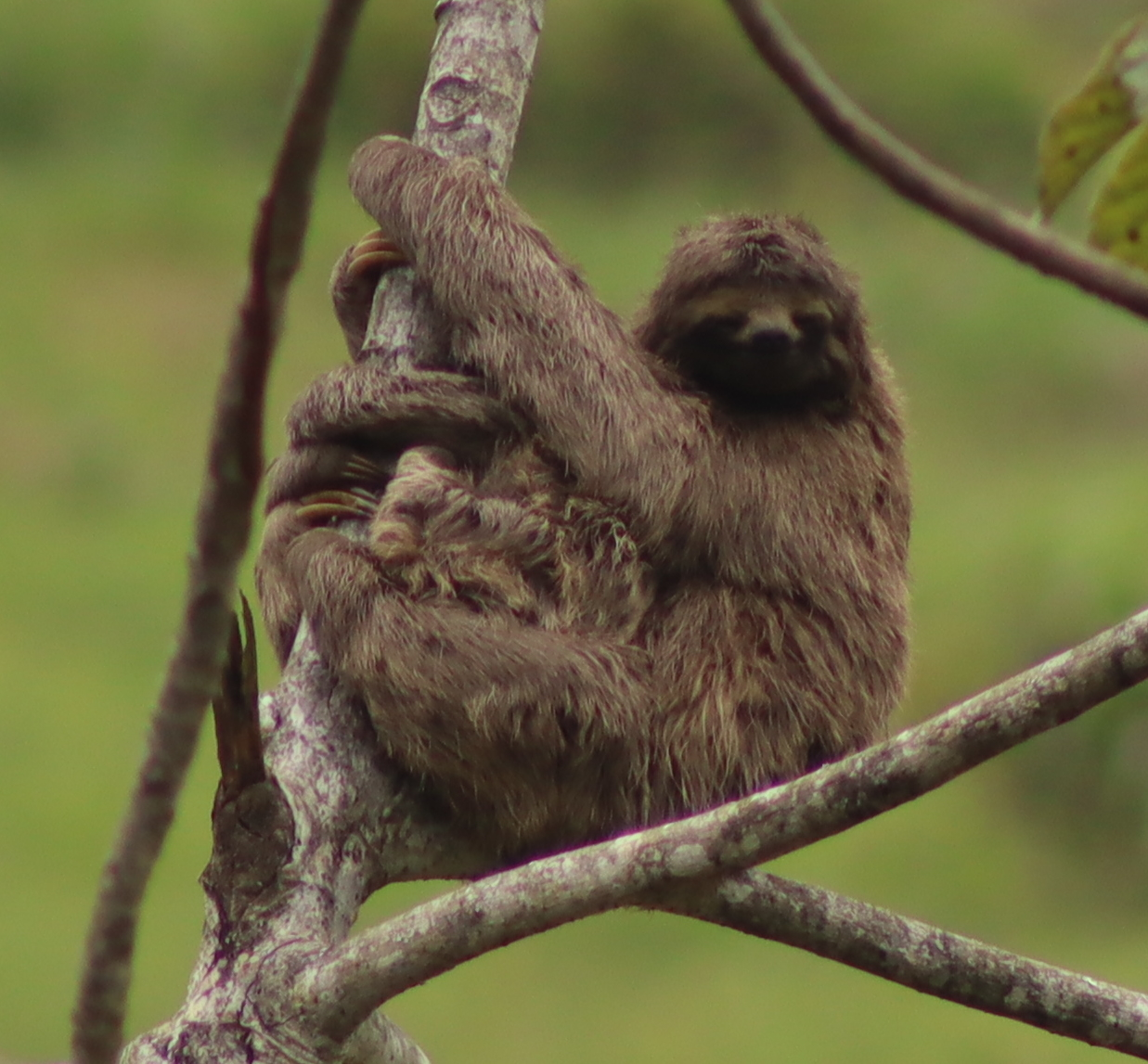
Brown-throated sloth in Governador Lindenberg

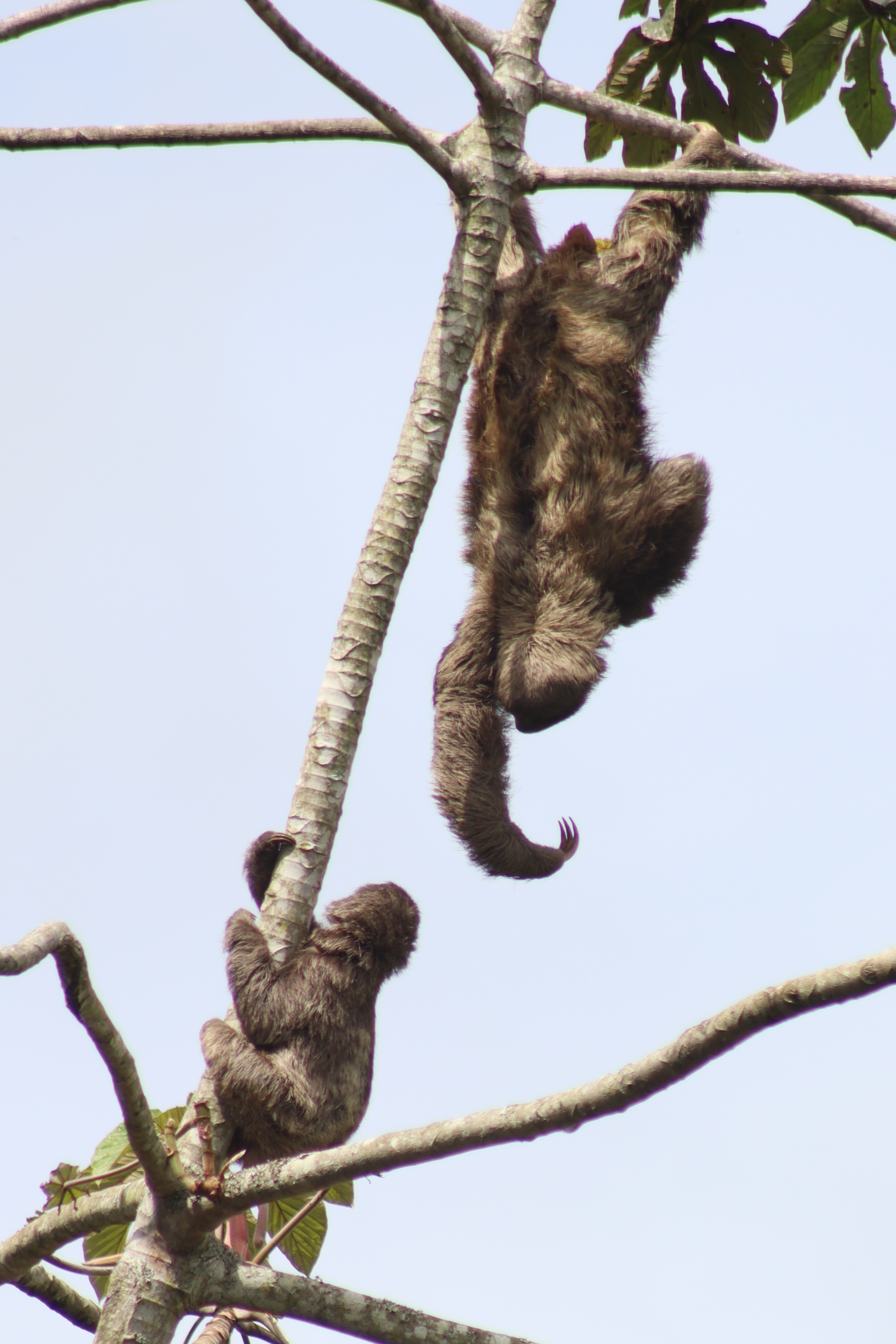
Brown-throated sloth in Governador Lindenberg

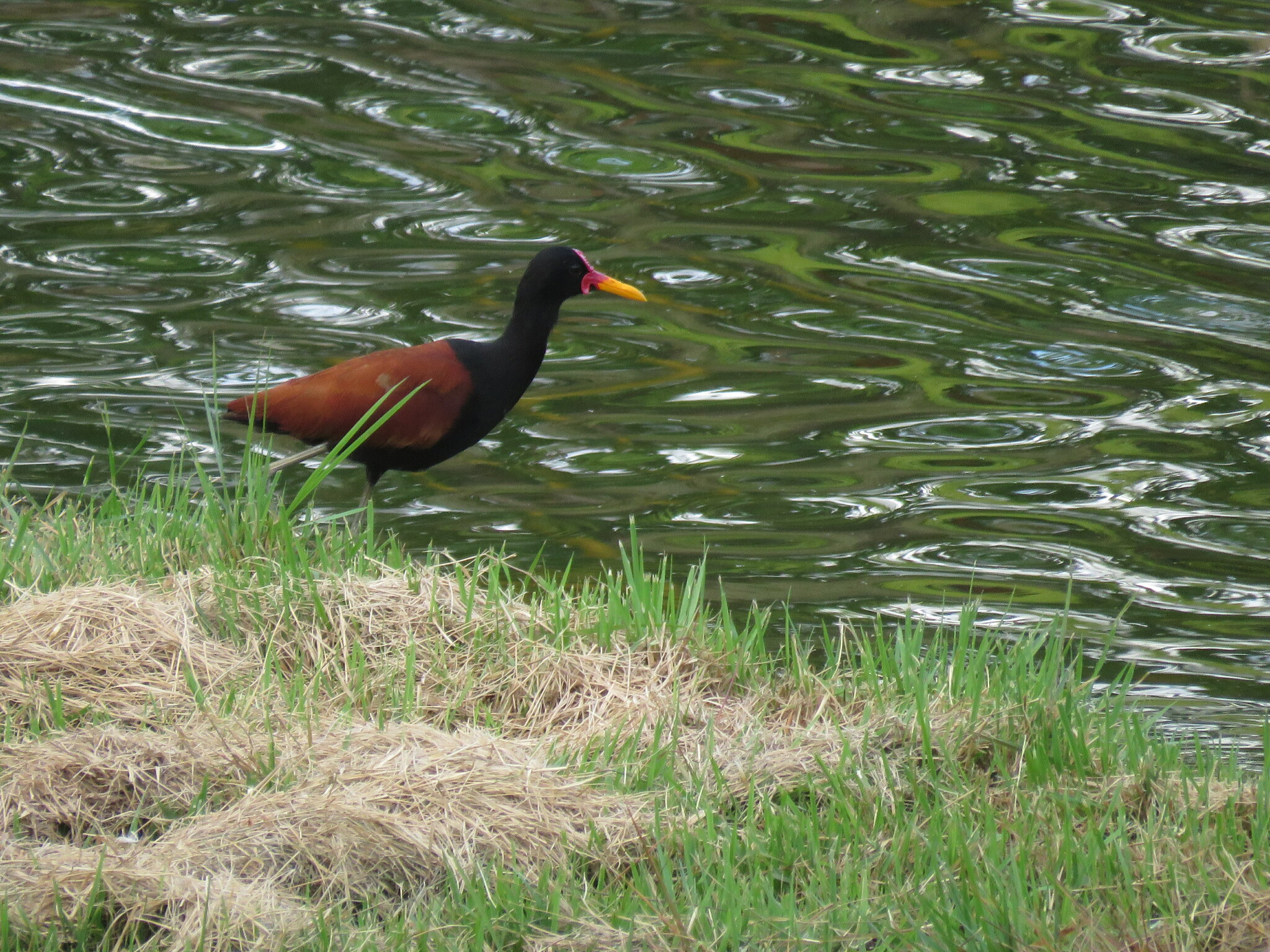
Wattled jacana in Governador Lindenberg

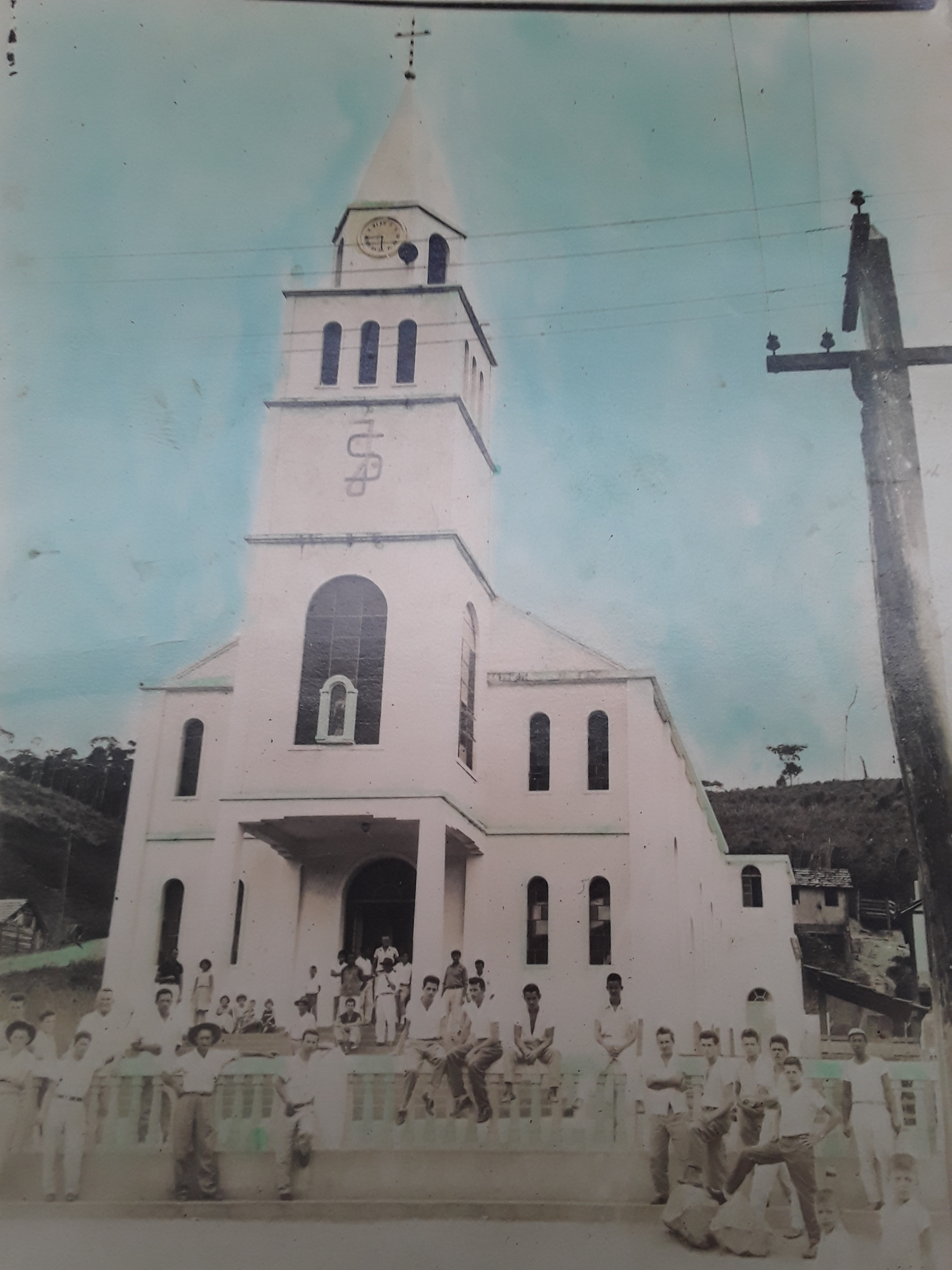
Church of Saint Joseph in the 1950s or the 1960s

== See also ==
- List of municipalities in Espírito Santo
