= Marilândia =

Municipality of Espírito Santo, Brazil

- Municipality of Espírito Santo, Brazil
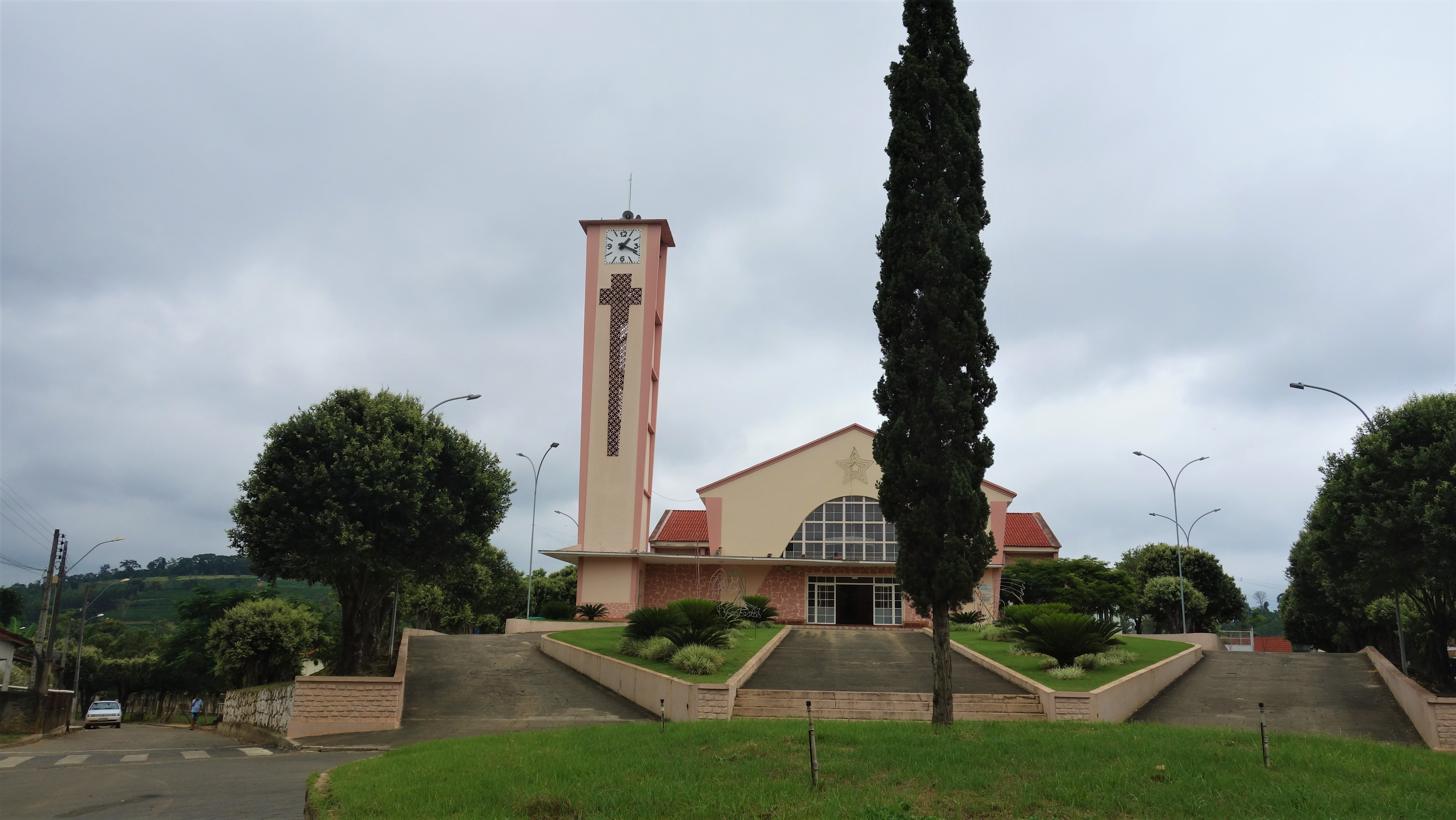
- Parish of Our Lady Help of Christians church in Marilândia

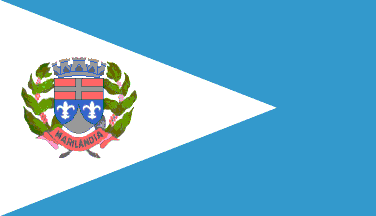
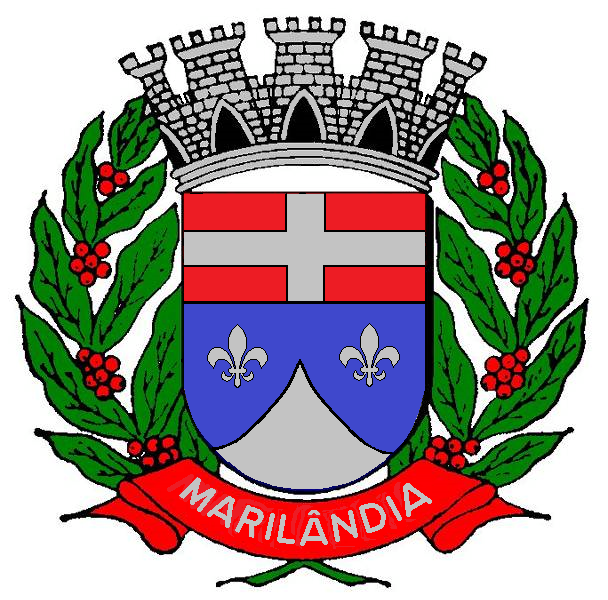
- Flag Coat of arms
- Etymology: Means in Brazilian Portuguese "Land of Maria", named after the Virgin Mary
- Location of Marilândia in Espírito Santo

- Location within Brazil Location within South America
- Coordinates: 19°24′46″S 40°32′31″W
- Country: Brazil
- Region: Southeast
- State: Espírito Santo
- Founded: 14 May 1980

Government
  - Mayor: Augusto Astori Ferreira (PSB) (2025-2028)
  - Vice Mayor: Warley Arrivabeni (PP) (2025-2028)

Area
  - Total: 327.642 km^{2} (126.503 sq mi)
- Elevation: 88 m (289 ft)

Population (2022)
  - Total: 12,387
  - Density: 37.81/km^{2} (97.9/sq mi)
- Demonym: Marilandense (Brazilian Portuguese)
- Time zone: UTC-03:00 (Brasília Time)
- Postal code: 29725-000, 29728-000
- HDI (2010): 0.696 – medium
- Website: marilandia.es.gov.br

Marilândia is a municipality located in the Brazilian state of Espírito Santo. Its population was 12,963 (2020) and its area is 328 km^{2}.

== Geography ==
=== Climate ===
Climate data for Marilândia (1981–2010)
Month	Jan	Feb	Mar	Apr	May	Jun	Jul	Aug	Sep	Oct	Nov	Dec	Year
Mean daily maximum °C (°F)	33.3 (91.9)	33.9 (93.0)	33.1 (91.6)	31.3 (88.3)	29.3 (84.7)	28.0 (82.4)	27.8 (82.0)	28.6 (83.5)	29.4 (84.9)	30.8 (87.4)	31.1 (88.0)	32.1 (89.8)	30.7 (87.3)
Daily mean °C (°F)	26.9 (80.4)	27.0 (80.6)	26.5 (79.7)	25.0 (77.0)	22.7 (72.9)	21.1 (70.0)	20.9 (69.6)	21.6 (70.9)	22.9 (73.2)	24.4 (75.9)	25.1 (77.2)	26.2 (79.2)	24.2 (75.6)
Mean daily minimum °C (°F)	22.1 (71.8)	22.0 (71.6)	21.9 (71.4)	20.5 (68.9)	18.1 (64.6)	16.3 (61.3)	16.0 (60.8)	16.3 (61.3)	18.0 (64.4)	19.8 (67.6)	20.8 (69.4)	21.7 (71.1)	19.5 (67.1)
Average precipitation mm (inches)	164.1 (6.46)	102.9 (4.05)	154.7 (6.09)	76.4 (3.01)	37.9 (1.49)	28.4 (1.12)	29.7 (1.17)	22.6 (0.89)	36.0 (1.42)	96.7 (3.81)	178.8 (7.04)	201.2 (7.92)	1,129.4 (44.46)
Average precipitation days (≥ 1.0 mm)	11	9	10	8	5	4	5	4	5	8	11	12	92
Average relative humidity (%)	72.4	71.8	74.8	77.5	78.0	78.4	78.5	73.3	71.5	71.2	74.7	74.4	74.7
Source: Instituto Nacional de Meteorologia

== See also ==
- List of municipalities in Espírito Santo
