= Ecoporanga, Espírito Santo =

Ecoporanga
- Municipality
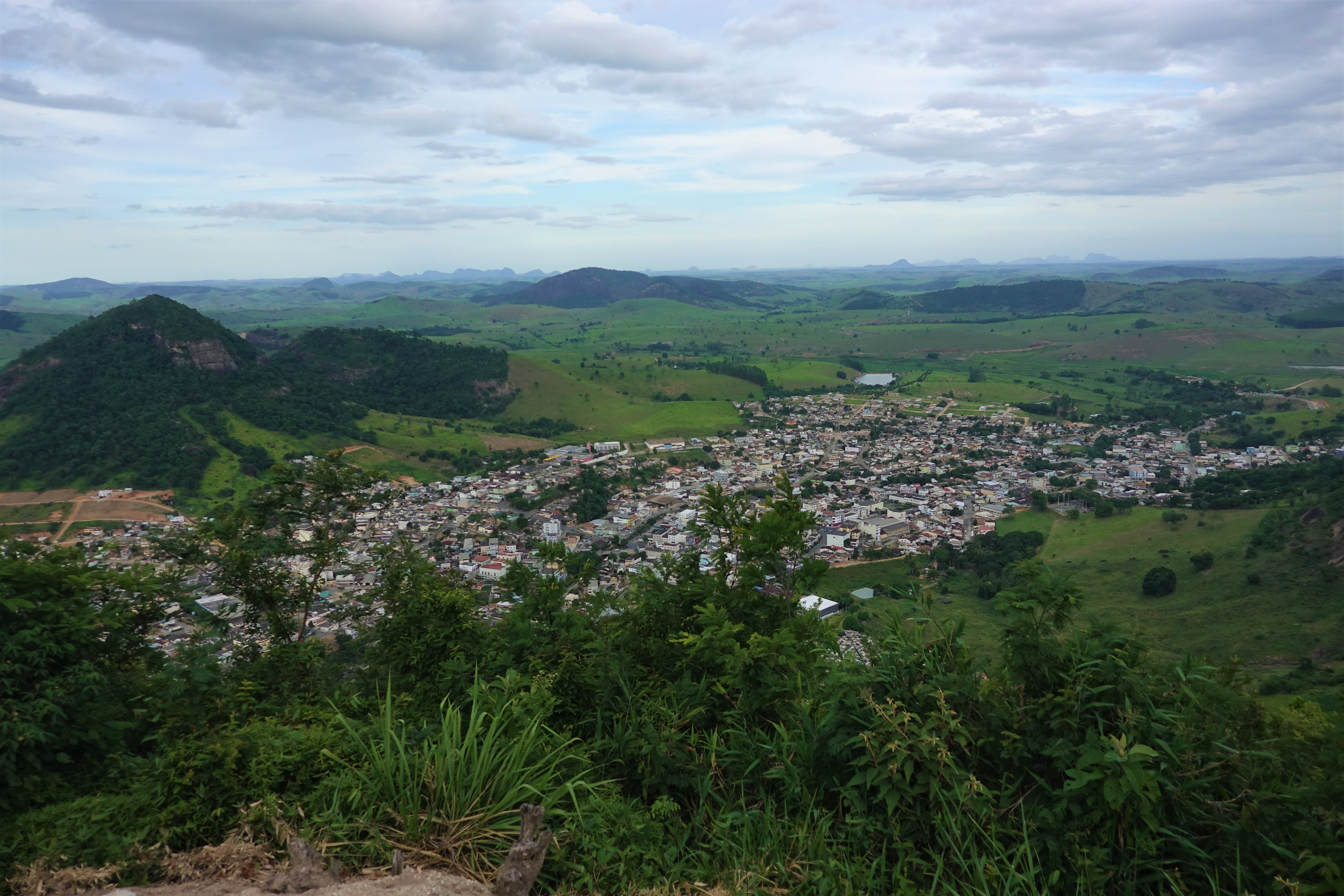

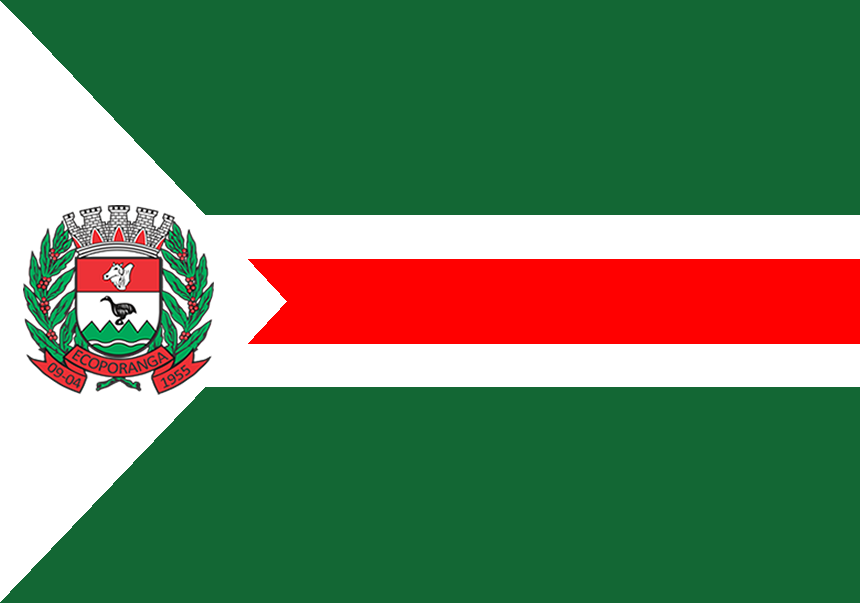
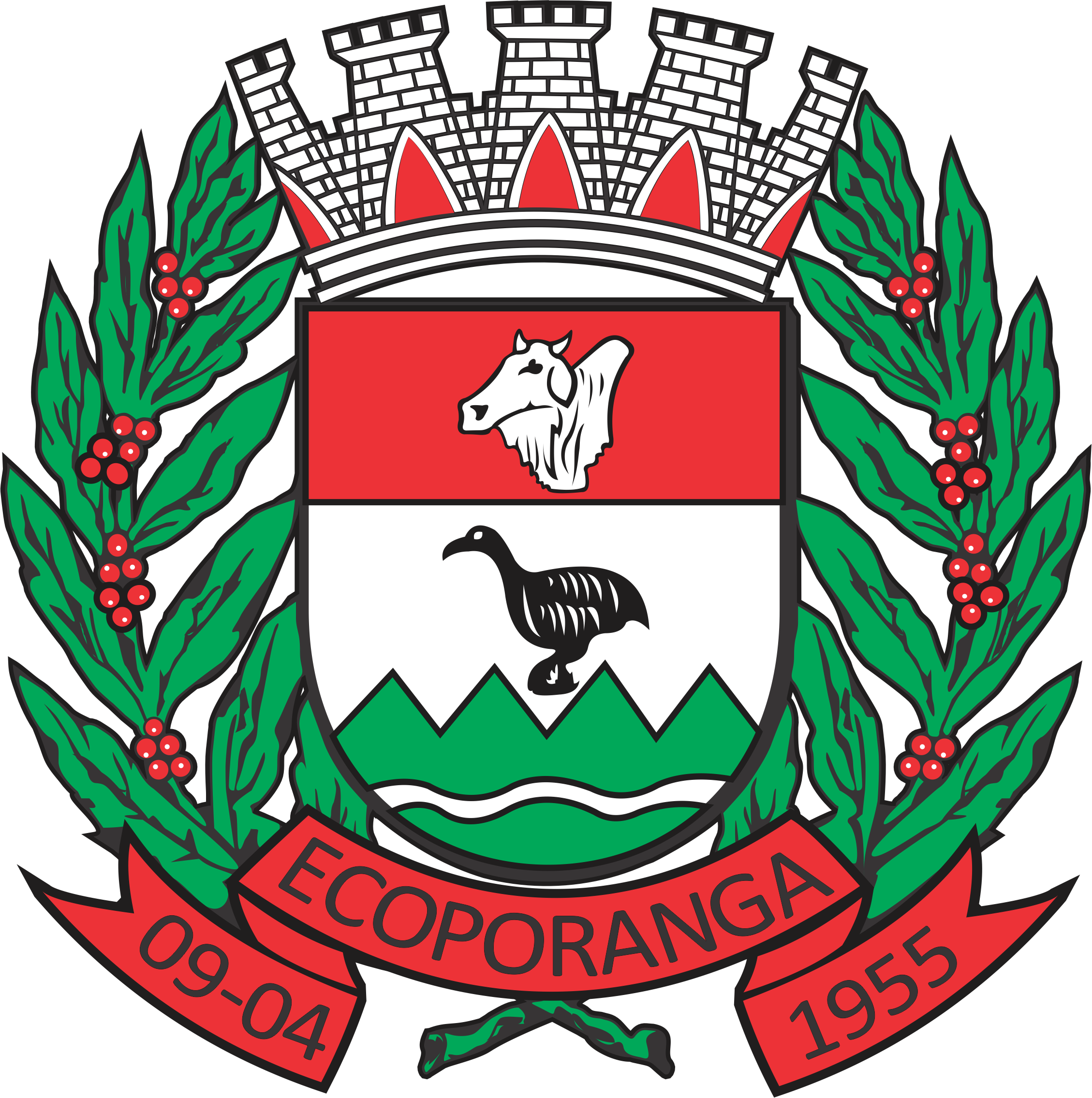
- Flag Coat of arms

- Location in the Espírito Santo

- Location in Brazil
- Coordinates: 18°22′22″S 40°49′51″W
- Country: Brazil
- Region: Southeast
- State: Espírito Santo
- Founded: April 9, 1955

Area
  - Total: 2,283.227 km^{2} (881.559 sq mi)

Population (2020)
  - Total: 22,835
- Time zone: UTC−3 (BRT)
- Website: www.ecoporanga.es.gov.br

Ecoporanga is a municipality located in the Brazilian state of Espírito Santo. Its population was 22,835 (2020) and its area is 2,285 km^{2} (882 sq mi). It is located in north Espírito Santo near Bahia and Minas Gerais.

== Geography ==
=== Climate ===
Climate data for Ecoporanga (1981–2010)
Month	Jan	Feb	Mar	Apr	May	Jun	Jul	Aug	Sep	Oct	Nov	Dec	Year
Mean daily maximum °C (°F)	32.7 (90.9)	33.3 (91.9)	32.3 (90.1)	30.9 (87.6)	29.2 (84.6)	27.9 (82.2)	27.5 (81.5)	28.0 (82.4)	28.8 (83.8)	30.1 (86.2)	30.1 (86.2)	31.1 (88.0)	30.2 (86.4)
Mean daily minimum °C (°F)	21.1 (70.0)	21.4 (70.5)	21.0 (69.8)	20.3 (68.5)	18.4 (65.1)	17.1 (62.8)	16.7 (62.1)	16.9 (62.4)	18.1 (64.6)	19.5 (67.1)	20.3 (68.5)	20.8 (69.4)	19.3 (66.7)
Average precipitation mm (inches)	107.0 (4.21)	80.0 (3.15)	111.0 (4.37)	66.0 (2.60)	32.0 (1.26)	21.0 (0.83)	21.0 (0.83)	20.0 (0.79)	26.0 (1.02)	74.0 (2.91)	156.0 (6.14)	182.0 (7.17)	896 (35.28)
Source 1: Instituto Nacional de Meteorologia
Source 2: Climatempo (precipitation)
