= Ponto Belo =

- Municipality of Espírito Santo, Brazil
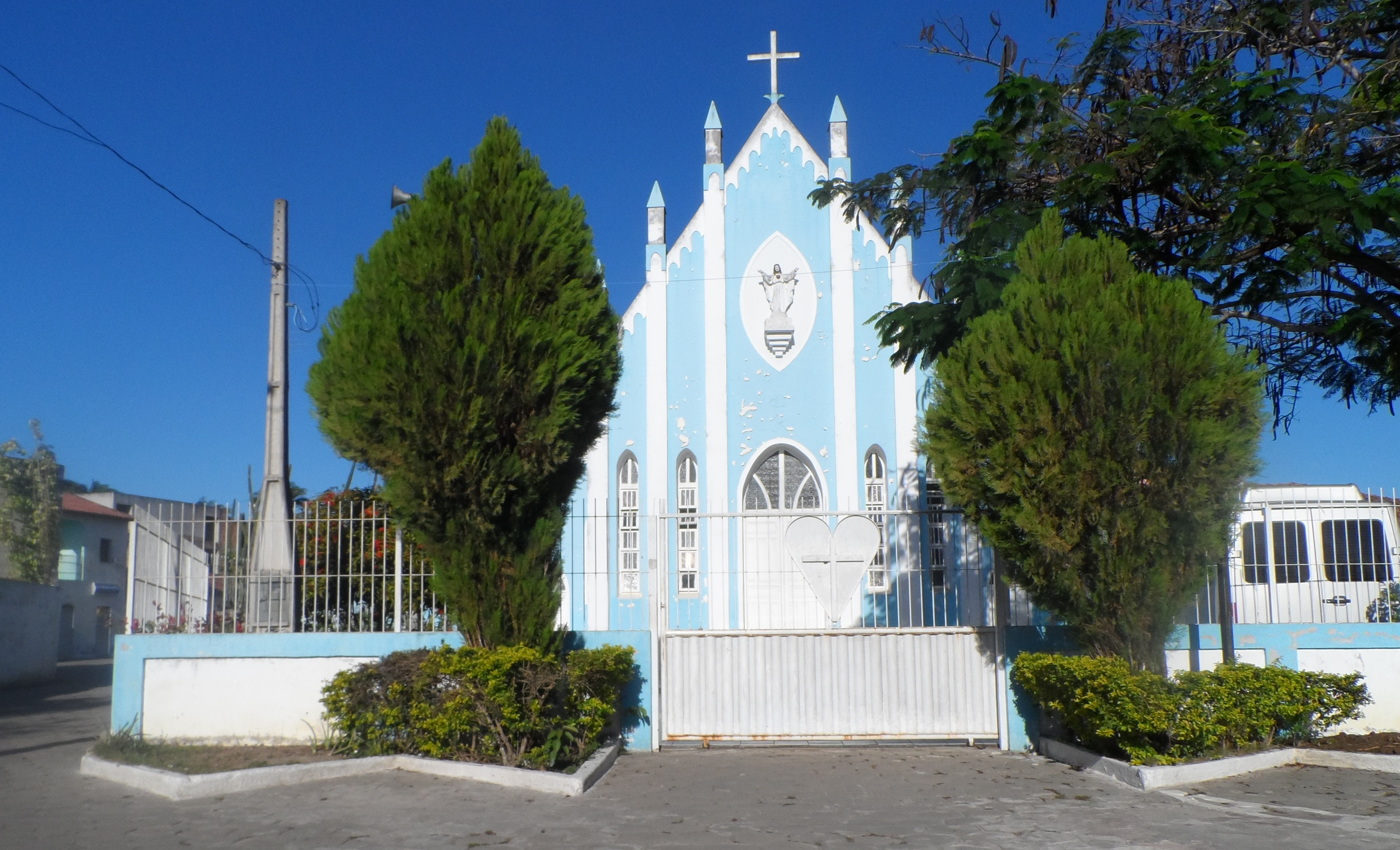
- Parish of the Sacred Heart of Jesus Church

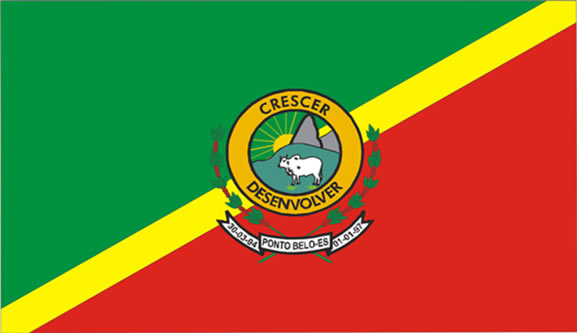
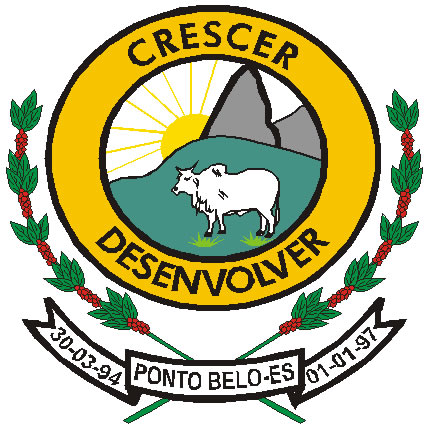
- Flag Coat of arms
- Motto: Brazilian Portuguese: Crescer e Desenvolver; English: To grow and develop
- Location of Ponto Belo in Espírito Santo

- Location within Brazil Location within South America
- Coordinates: 18°7′26″S 40°32′27″W
- Country: Brazil
- Region: Southeast
- State: Espírito Santo
- Founded: 30 March 1994

Government
  - Mayor: Marcos Coutinho Sant Aguida do Nascimento (MDB) (2025-2028)
  - Vice Mayor: Felipe Fonseca Oliveira (PSB) (2025-2028)

Area
  - Total: 360.110 km^{2} (139.039 sq mi)
- Elevation: 265 m (869 ft)

Population (2022)
  - Total: 6,497
  - Density: 18.04/km^{2} (46.7/sq mi)
- Demonym: Pontobelense (Brazilian Portuguese)
- Time zone: UTC-03:00 (Brasília Time)
- Postal code: 29885-000, 29889-000
- HDI (2010): 0.669 – medium
- Website: pontobelo.es.gov.br

Ponto Belo is a municipality located in the Brazilian state of Espírito Santo. Its population was 6,497 (2022) and its area is 360 km^{2}.

== See also ==
- List of municipalities in Espírito Santo
