= Ibitirama =

- Municipality
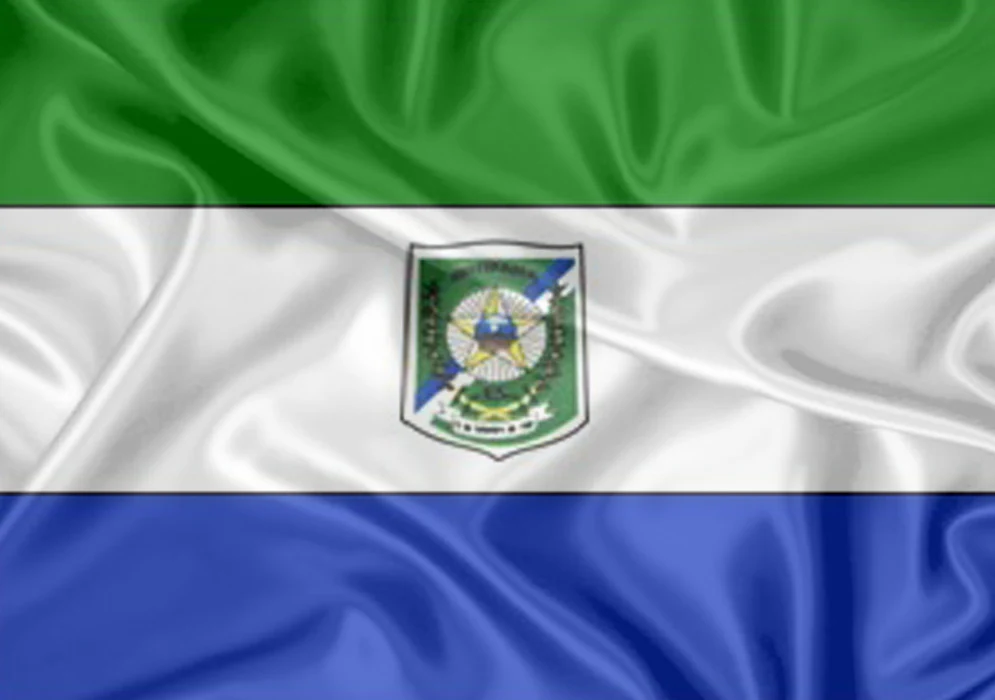
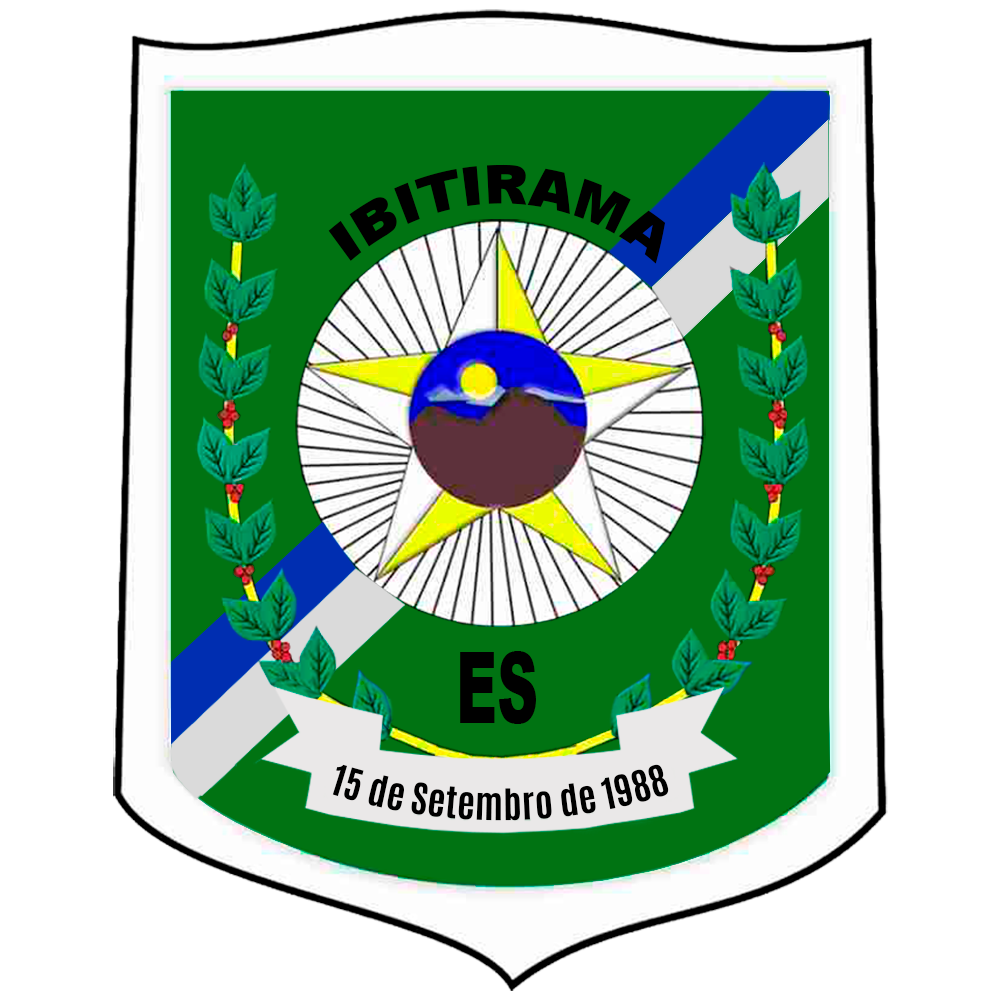
- Flag Coat of arms

- Location in Espírito Santo state

- Location in Brazil
- Coordinates: 20°32′27″S 41°40′1″W
- Country: Brazil
- Region: Southeast
- State: Espírito Santo
- Established: 15 September 1988

Area
  - Total: 330 km^{2} (130 sq mi)

Population (2020)
  - Total: 8,859
  - Density: 27/km^{2} (70/sq mi)
- Time zone: UTC−3 (BRT)

Ibitirama is a municipality located in the Brazilian state of Espírito Santo. Its population was 8,859 (2020) and its area is 330 km^{2}.
