= Divino de São Lourenço =

- Municipality
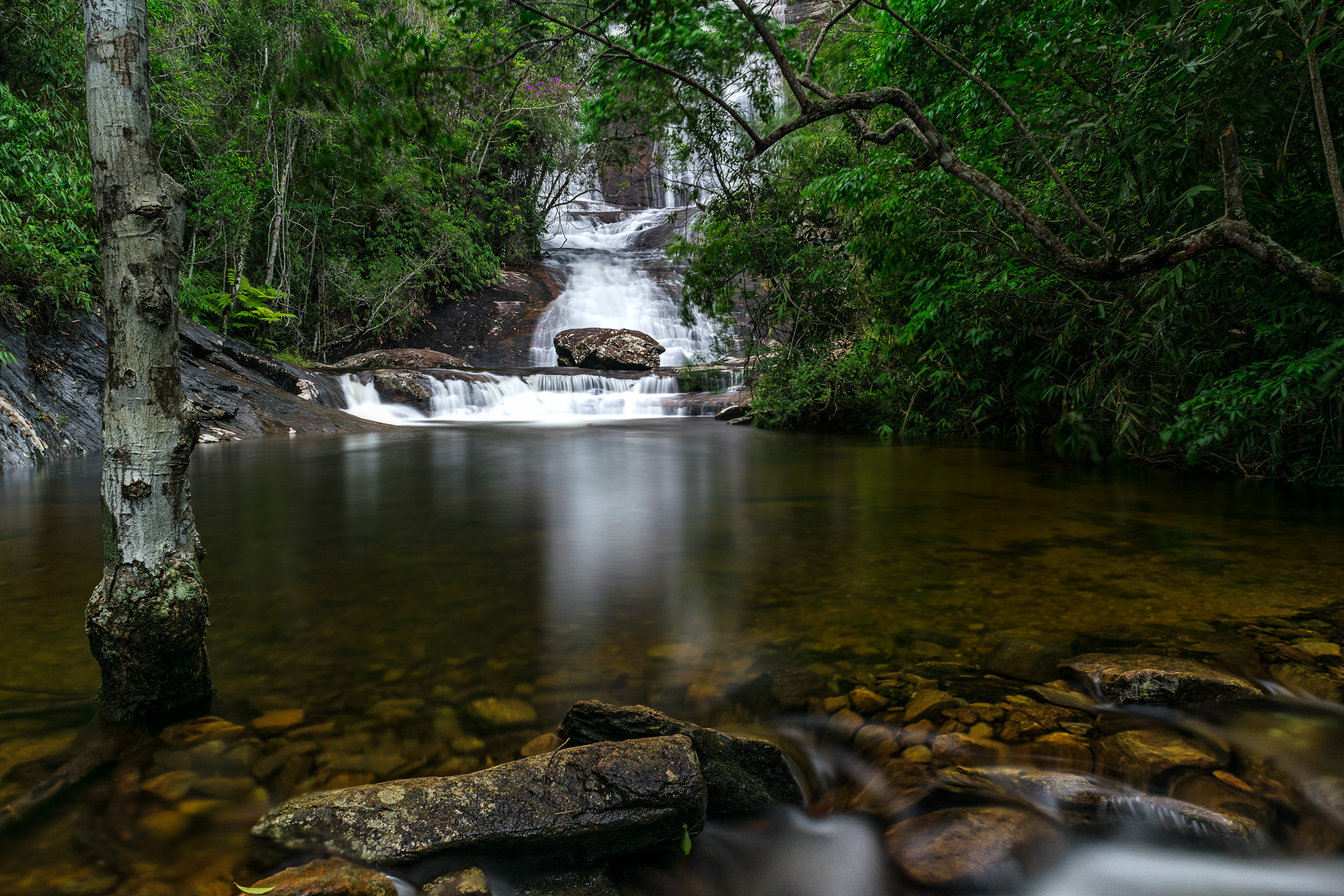

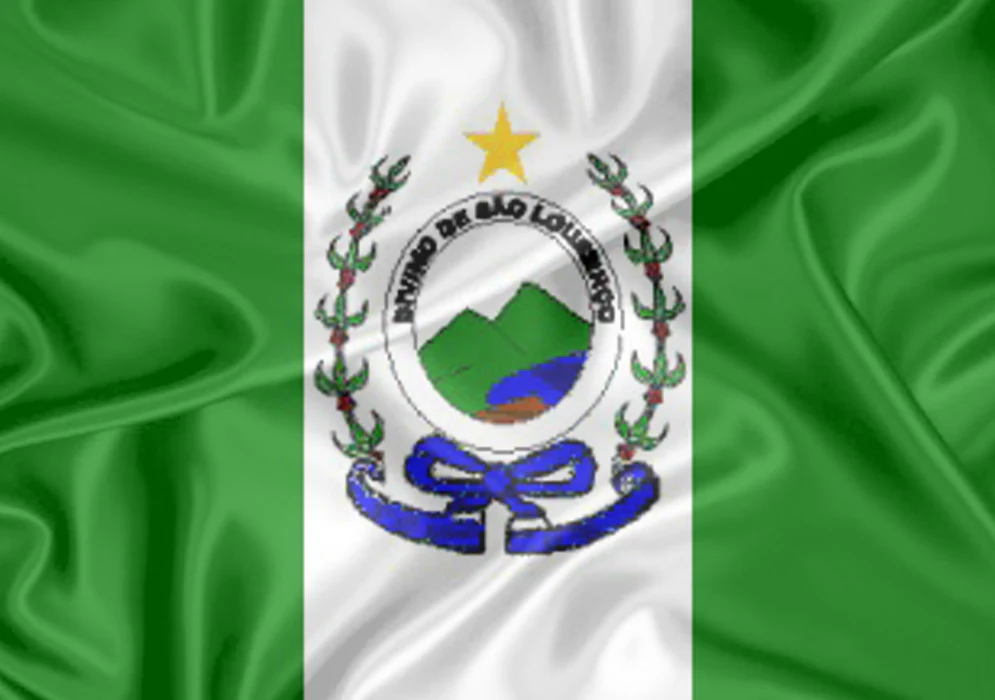
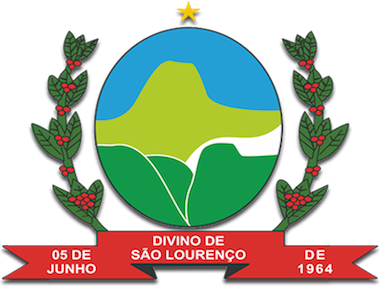
- Flag Coat of arms

- Location in Espírito Santo state

- Location in Brazil
- Coordinates: 20°37′12″S 41°41′9″W
- Country: Brazil
- Region: Southeast
- State: Espírito Santo
- Established: 30 December 1963

Area
  - Total: 174 km^{2} (67 sq mi)

Population (2015)
  - Total: 4,649
  - Density: 26.7/km^{2} (69.2/sq mi)
- Time zone: UTC−3 (BRT)

Divino de São Lourenço is a municipality located in the Brazilian state of Espírito Santo. Its population was 4,649 (2015) and its area is 174 km^{2}.
