= Jerônimo Monteiro =

Coordinates: 20°47′20″S 41°23′42″W

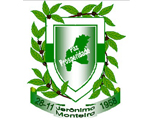
- Flag Coat of arms

- Established: 28 November 1958

Area
  - Total: 162.164 km^{2} (62.612 sq mi)

Population (2020)
  - Total: 12,265
  - Density: 75.633/km^{2} (195.89/sq mi)

Jerônimo Monteiro is a municipality located in the Brazilian state of Espírito Santo. Its population was 12,265 (2020) and its area is 162 km^{2}.

== See also ==
- List of municipalities in Espírito Santo
