= Irupi =

- Municipality
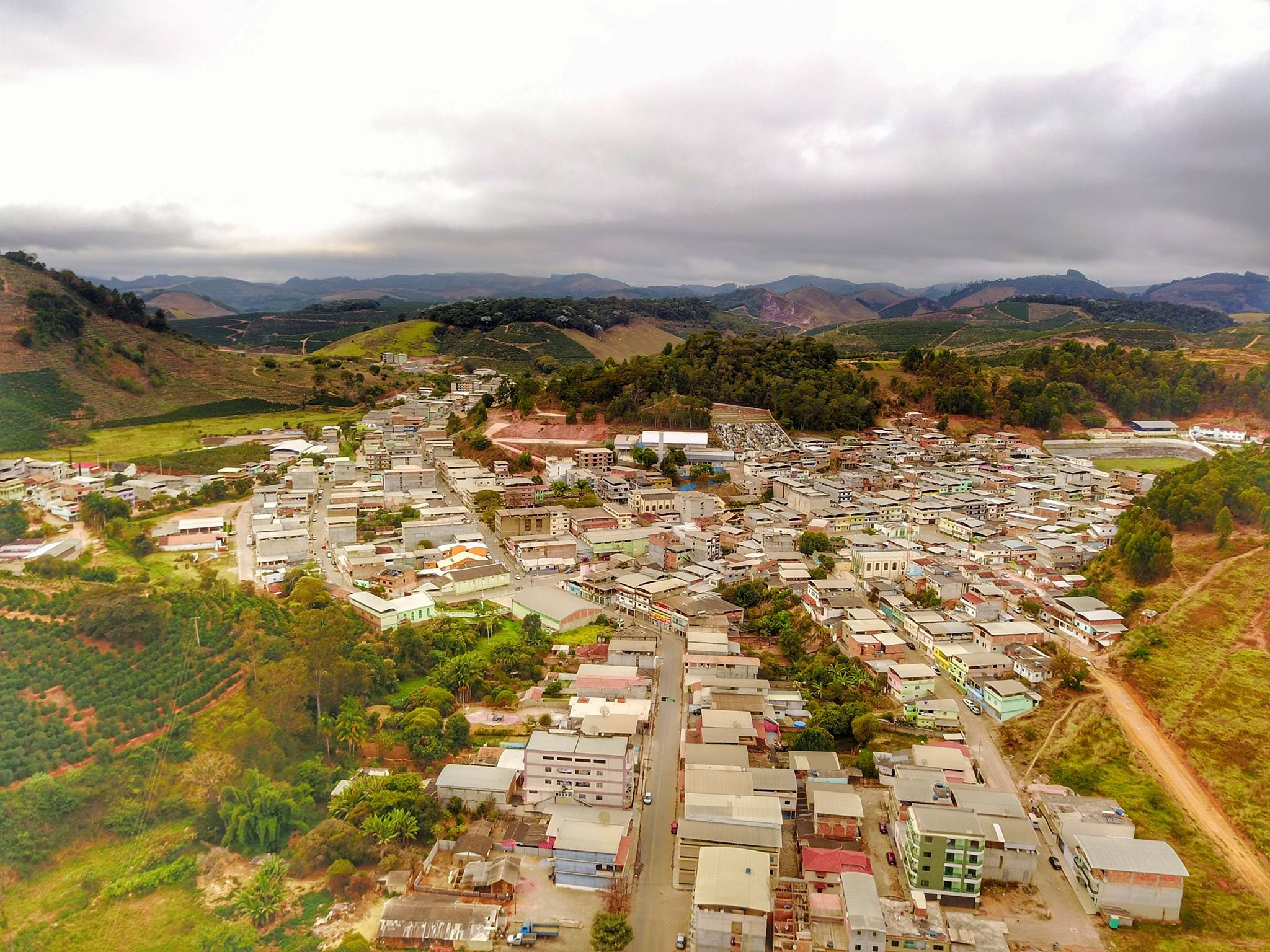
- View of Irupi

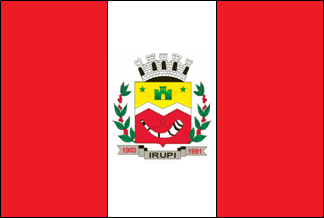
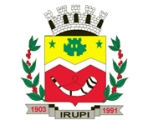
- Flag Coat of arms

- Location in Espírito Santo state

- Location in Brazil
- Coordinates: 20°20′42″S 41°38′27″W
- Country: Brazil
- Region: Southeast
- State: Espírito Santo

Area
  - Total: 185 km^{2} (71 sq mi)

Population (2020)
  - Total: 13,526
  - Density: 73.1/km^{2} (189/sq mi)
- Time zone: UTC-03:00 (BRT)
  - Summer (DST): UTC-02:00 (BRST)

Irupi is a municipality located in the Brazilian state of Espírito Santo. Its population was 13,526 (2020) and its area is 185 km^{2} (71 sq mi).
