= Brejetuba =

- Municipality
- Flag Coat of arms

- Location in Brazil
- Coordinates: 20°8′45″S 41°17′24″W
- Country: Brazil
- Region: Southeast
- State: Espírito Santo

Area
  - Total: 354 km^{2} (137 sq mi)

Population (2020)
  - Total: 12,427
  - Density: 35.1/km^{2} (90.9/sq mi)
- Time zone: UTC−3 (BRT)

Brejetuba is a municipality located in the Brazilian state of Espírito Santo. Its population was 12,427 (2020) and its area is 354 km^{2}.
