= Piúma =

- Municipality
- The Municipality of Piúma
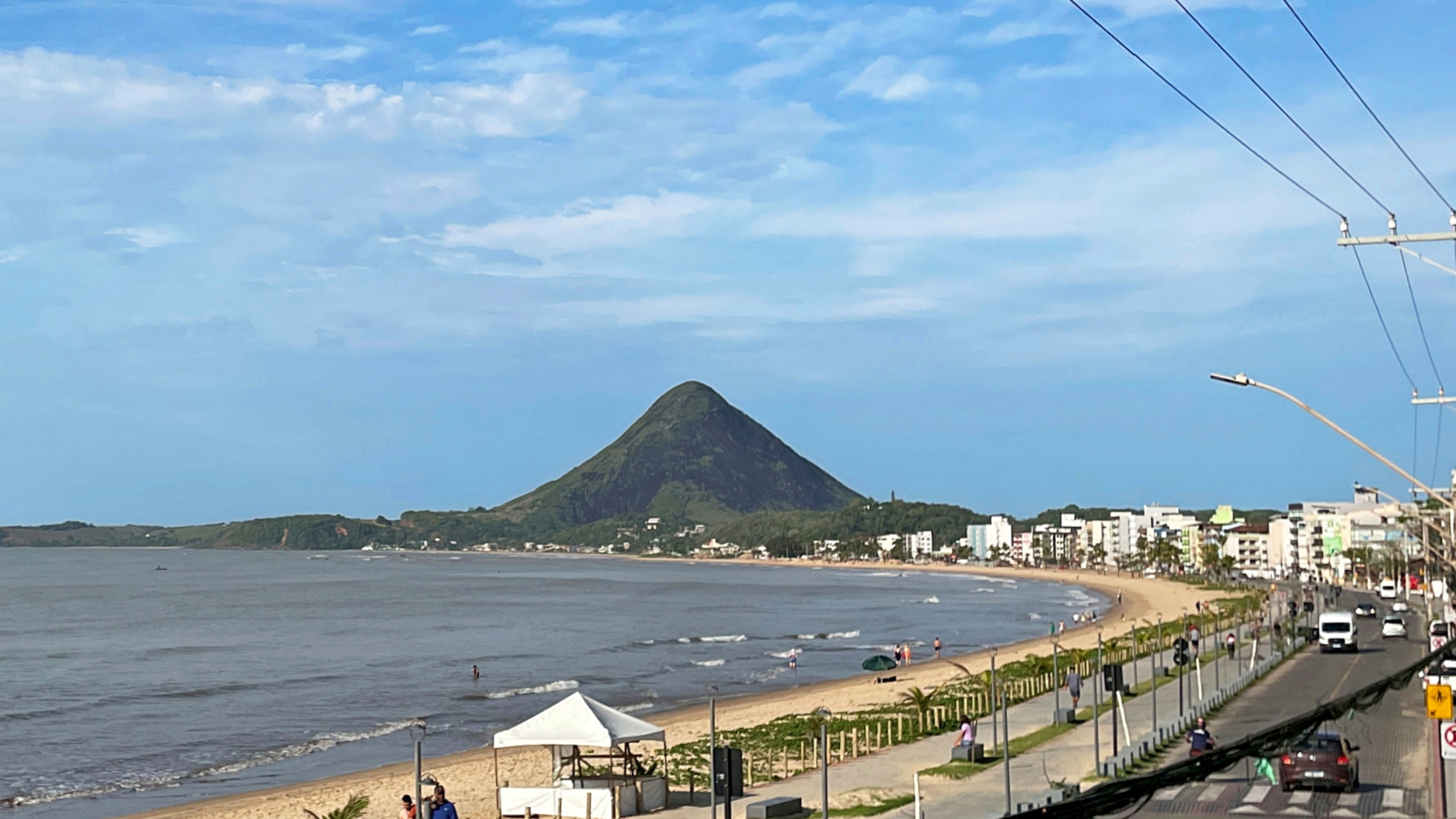
- Partial view of the coast of Piúma with the Aghá mount in the background

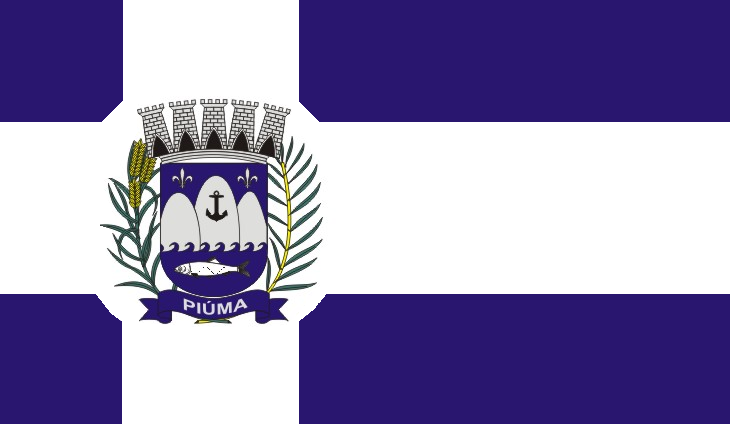
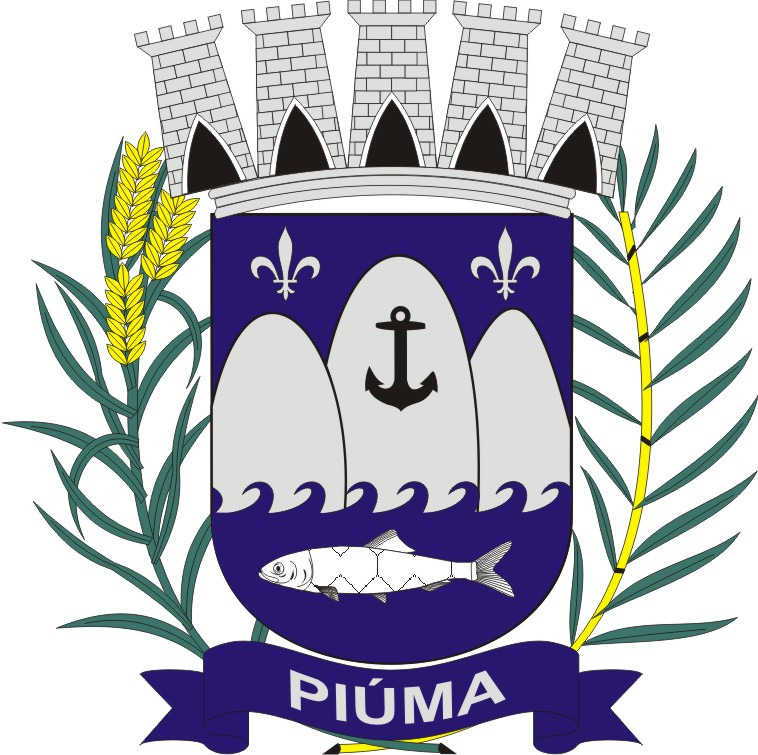
- Flag Coat of arms
- Nickname: "Cidade das Conchas" (City of Shells)
- Location of Piúma in the State of Espírito Santo
- Coordinates: 20°50′21″S 40°43′36″W
- Country: Brazil
- Region: Southeast
- State: Espírito Santo
- Founded: December 24, 1963

Government
  - Mayor: José Ricardo Pereira da Costa (PR)

Area
  - Total: 73.504 km^{2} (28.380 sq mi)

Population (2020)
  - Total: 22,053
  - Density: 300.02/km^{2} (777.06/sq mi)
- Time zone: UTC−3 (BRT)
- HDI (2000): 0.776 – medium
- Website: www.piuma.es.gov.br

Piúma is a municipality located in the Brazilian state of Espírito Santo. Its population was 22,053 (2020) and its area is 74 km^{2} (29 sq mi), which makes it the smallest municipality of Espírito Santo. Much of the local population make a living from fishing, handicrafts and the cultivation of shellfish, activities benefited from the natural wealth located along the coast. The city is also famous for receiving thousands of tourists during the week of Carnival.
