= São Roque do Canaã =

- Municipality of Espírito Santo, Brazil
- Flag Coat of arms
- Etymology: Means in Brazilian Portuguese "Saint Roch of Canaã", named after the patron saint and the Canaã Valley
- Location of São Roque do Canaã in Espírito Santo

- Location within Brazil Location within South America
- Coordinates: 19°44′20″S 40°39′25″W
- Country: Brazil
- Region: Southeast
- State: Espírito Santo
- Founded: 25 June 1995

Government
  - Mayor: Marcos Geraldo Guerra (PSDB) (2025-2028)
  - Vice Mayor: Gabriel Força Silvestre (Republicanos) (2025-2028)

Area
  - Total: 341.944 km^{2} (132.025 sq mi)
- Elevation: 120 m (390 ft)

Population (2022)
  - Total: 10,886
  - Density: 31.84/km^{2} (82.5/sq mi)
- Demonym: São-roquense (Brazilian Portuguese)
- Time zone: UTC-03:00 (Brasília Time)
- Postal code: 29665-000, 29667-000, 29669-000
- HDI (2010): 0.700 – high
- Website: saoroquedocanaa.es.gov.br

São Roque do Canaã is a municipality located in the Brazilian state of Espírito Santo. Its population was 12,510 (2020) and its area is 342 km^{2} (132 sq mi). The capital of the municipality is located at an altitude of 120 meters above sea level.

== See also ==
- List of municipalities in Espírito Santo
