= Alto Rio Novo =

- Municipality
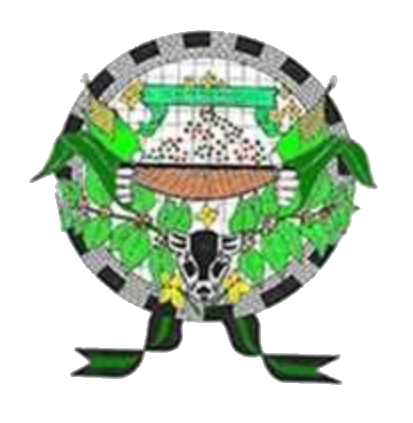
- Flag Coat of arms

- Location in Brazil
- Coordinates: 19°3′21″S 41°1′1″W
- Country: Brazil
- Region: Southeast
- State: Espírito Santo

Area
  - Total: 228 km^{2} (88 sq mi)

Population (2020)
  - Total: 7,874
  - Density: 34.5/km^{2} (89.4/sq mi)
- Time zone: UTC−3 (BRT)

Alto Rio Novo is a Brazilian municipality in the state of Espírito Santo. Its population was 7,874 (2020) and its area is 228 km^{2} (88 sq mi).
