= Santa Teresa, Espírito Santo =

Santa Teresa
- Municipality
- Municipality of Santa Teresa
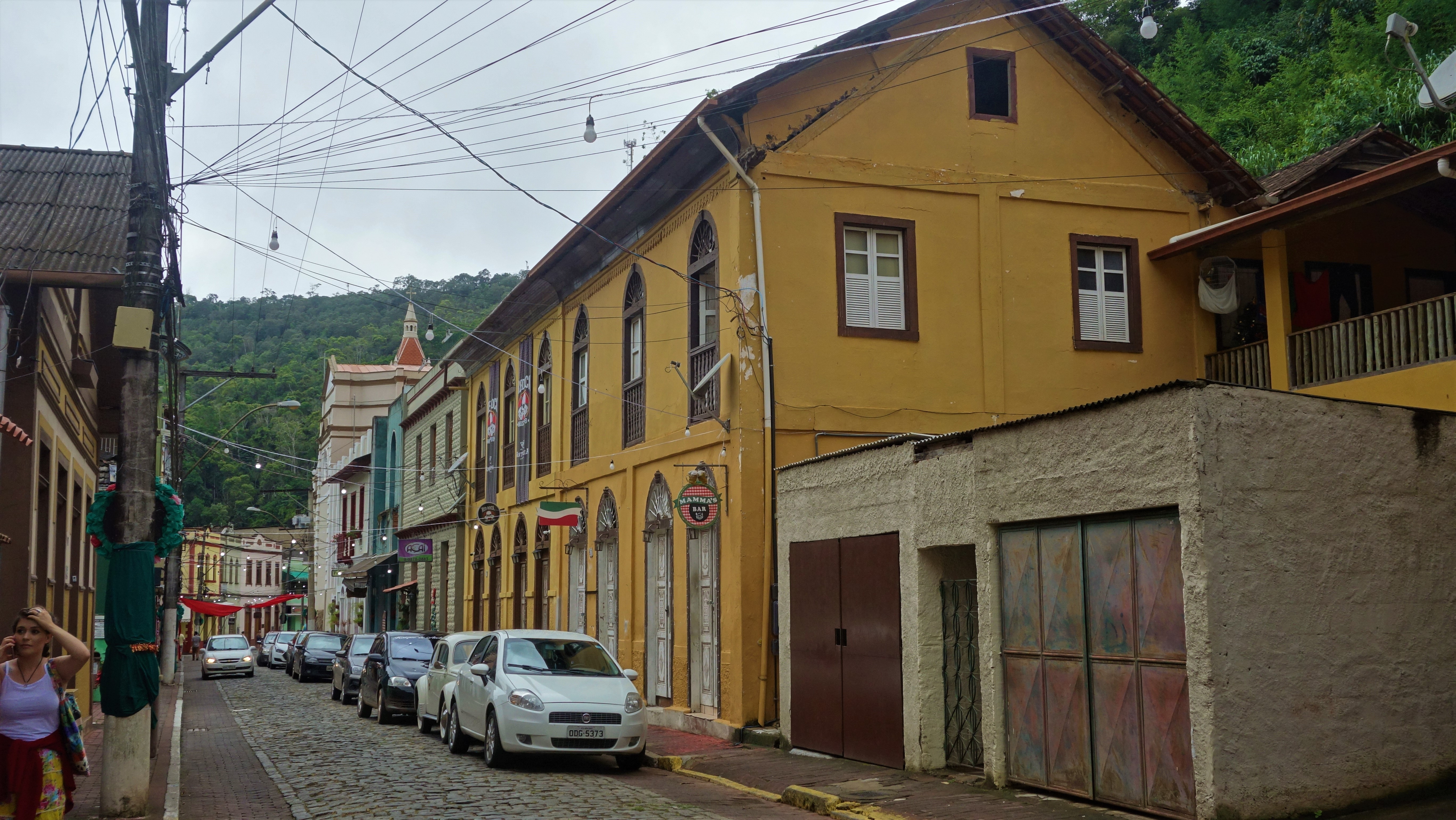

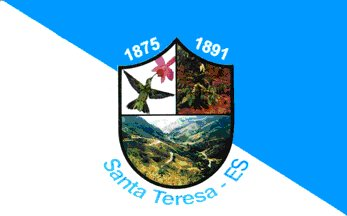
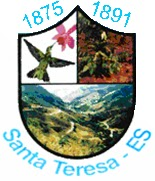
- Flag Coat of arms

- Location within Brazil
- Coordinates: 19.936°S 40.600°W
- Country: Brazil
- State: Espírito Santo
- Region: Southeast

Government
  - Mayor: Kleber Medici (PSDB)

Area
  - Total: 683.032 km^{2} (263.720 sq mi)

Population (2020)
  - Total: 23,724
  - Density: 34.733/km^{2} (89.959/sq mi)
- Time zone: UTC−3 (BRT)
- HDI (2010): 0.714 – high

Santa Teresa is a municipality located in the Brazilian state of Espírito Santo. Its population was 23,724 (2020) and its area is 695 km^{2}.

The municipality contains the 3,562 hectares (8,800 acres) Augusto Ruschi Biological Reserve, a fully protected area.

== Notable people ==
Augusto Ruschi was a Brazilian agronomist, ecologist, and naturalist. Ruschi was interested in the study of plants and animals since childhood, allowing him to know in depth several branches of biology, becoming a respected specialist in hummingbirds and orchids in Brazil.

Anderson Varejão of the NBA's Cleveland Cavaliers is originally from Santa Teresa.

== Geography ==
=== Climate ===
Climate data for Santa Teresa (1981–2010)
Month	Jan	Feb	Mar	Apr	May	Jun	Jul	Aug	Sep	Oct	Nov	Dec	Year
Mean daily maximum °C (°F)	28.0 (82.4)	28.8 (83.8)	28.0 (82.4)	26.3 (79.3)	24.7 (76.5)	23.8 (74.8)	22.9 (73.2)	23.4 (74.1)	24.1 (75.4)	25.2 (77.4)	25.8 (78.4)	27.1 (80.8)	25.7 (78.3)
Daily mean °C (°F)	22.3 (72.1)	22.5 (72.5)	22.2 (72.0)	20.6 (69.1)	18.8 (65.8)	17.3 (63.1)	16.8 (62.2)	17.0 (62.6)	18.4 (65.1)	19.8 (67.6)	20.9 (69.6)	21.9 (71.4)	19.9 (67.8)
Mean daily minimum °C (°F)	18.4 (65.1)	17.9 (64.2)	18.0 (64.4)	16.7 (62.1)	14.4 (57.9)	12.5 (54.5)	12.4 (54.3)	12.6 (54.7)	14.5 (58.1)	16.2 (61.2)	17.5 (63.5)	18.4 (65.1)	15.8 (60.4)
Average precipitation mm (inches)	227.8 (8.97)	95.5 (3.76)	172.6 (6.80)	93.0 (3.66)	42.8 (1.69)	37.3 (1.47)	42.5 (1.67)	42.7 (1.68)	69.0 (2.72)	114.3 (4.50)	222.7 (8.77)	226.6 (8.92)	1,386.8 (54.60)
Average precipitation days (≥ 1.0 mm)	14	10	12	9	7	5	6	6	8	11	14	16	118
Average relative humidity (%)	82.6	80.8	82.3	83.3	83.7	84.0	84.0	81.6	81.5	81.7	82.8	83.1	82.6
Mean monthly sunshine hours	175.8	193.9	179.6	166.2	165.6	159.8	157.9	171.6	132.5	131.5	128.8	143.8	1,907
Source: Instituto Nacional de Meteorologia
