= São Domingos do Norte =

- Municipality of Espírito Santo, Brazil
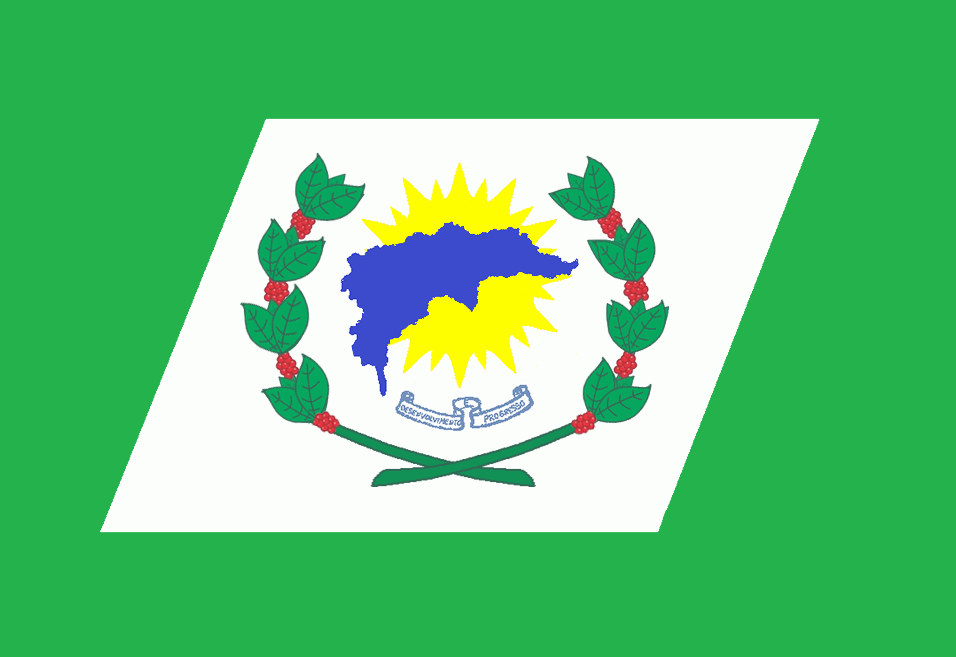
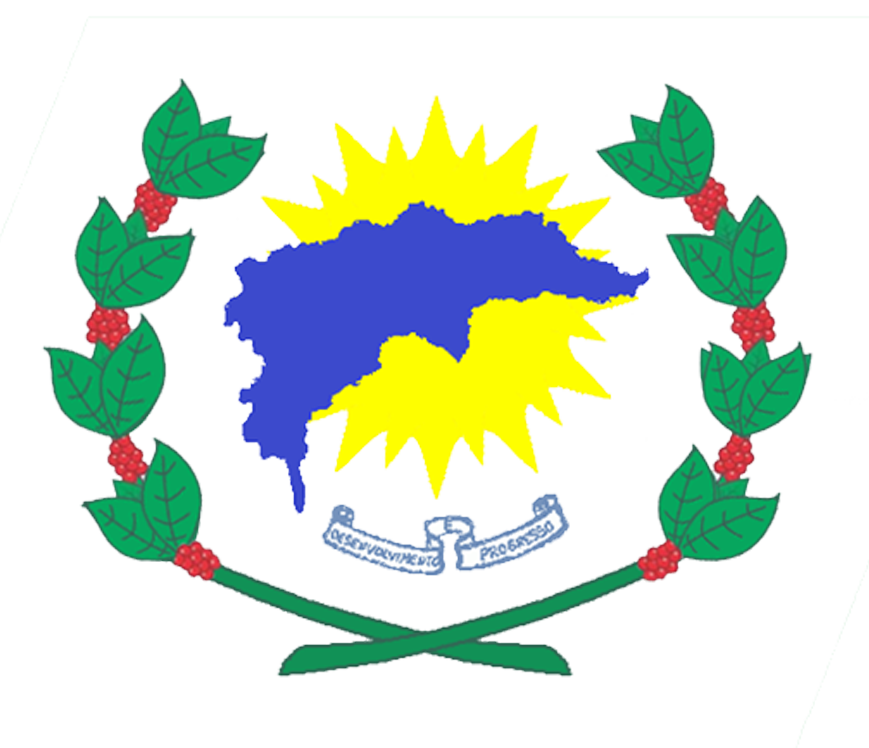
- Flag Coat of arms
- Etymology: Means in Brazilian Portuguese "Saint Dominic of the North", named after the patron saint and the municipality's location in the north of the state
- Location of São Domingos do Norte in Espírito Santo

- Location within Brazil Location within South America
- Coordinates: 19°8′40″S 40°37′22″W
- Country: Brazil
- Region: Southeast
- State: Espírito Santo
- Founded: 30 March 1990

Government
  - Mayor: Ana Izabel Malacarne de Oliveira (MDB) (2025-2028)
  - Vice Mayor: Ademar Storch Filho (Solidariedade) (2025-2028)

Area
  - Total: 298.580 km^{2} (115.282 sq mi)
- Elevation: 180 m (590 ft)

Population (2022)
  - Total: 8,589
  - Density: 28.77/km^{2} (74.5/sq mi)
- Demonym: Dominguense (Brazilian Portuguese)
- Time zone: UTC-03:00 (Brasília Time)
- Postal code: 29745-000, 29748-000
- HDI (2010): 0.682 – medium
- Website: saodomingosdonorte.es.gov.br

São Domingos do Norte is a municipality located in the Brazilian state of Espírito Santo. Its population was 8,687 (2020) and its area is 299 km^{2} (115 sq mi).

== See also ==
- List of municipalities in Espírito Santo
