= Mantenópolis =

Municipality of Espírito Santo, Brazil

- Municipality of Espírito Santo, Brazil
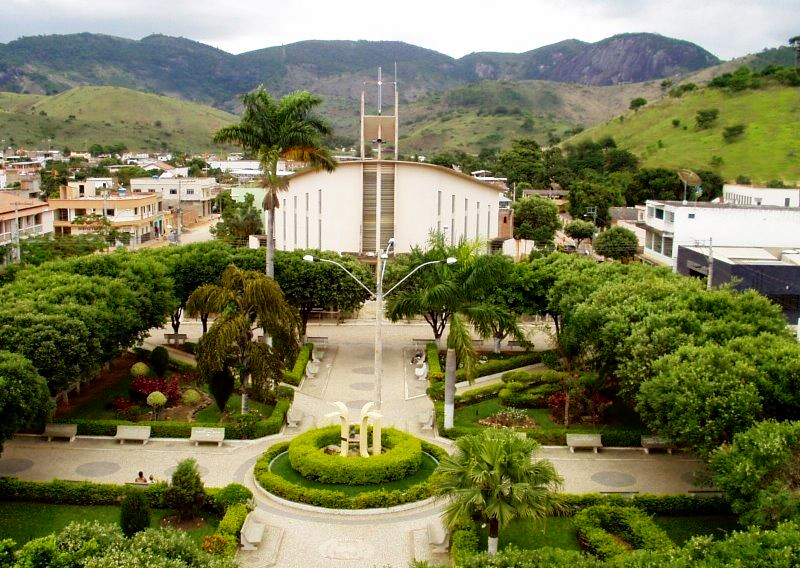
- Dom Luiz Plaza in Mantenópolis

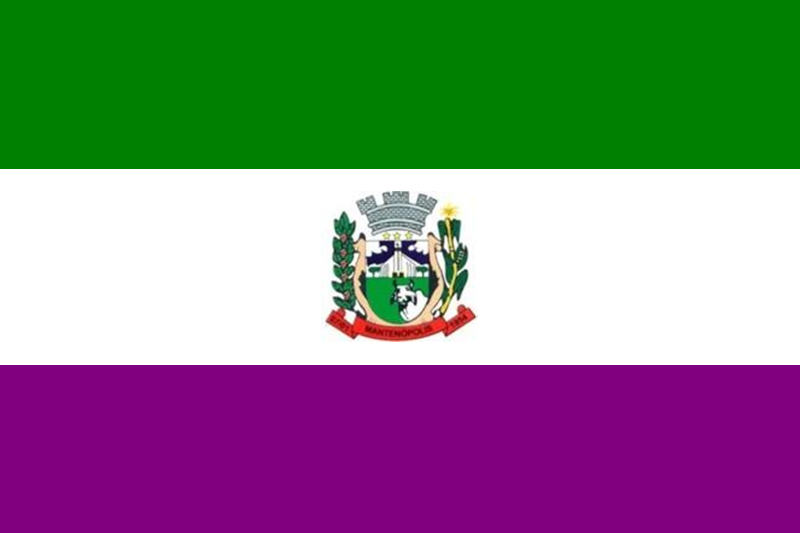
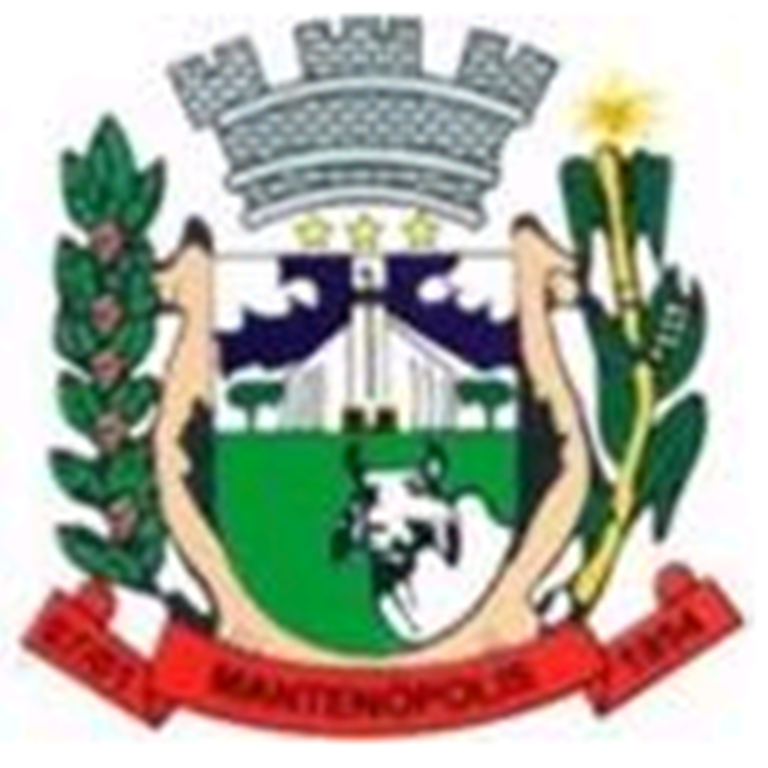
- Flag Coat of arms

- Location of Mantenópolis in Espírito Santo

- Location within Brazil Location within South America
- Coordinates: 18°51′46″S 41°7′22″W
- Country: Brazil
- Region: Southeast
- State: Espírito Santo
- Founded: 7 January 1954

Government
  - Mayor: Lucio Marques de Morais (PSDB) (2025-2028)
  - Vice Mayor: Geraldo Magelo Xavier (PP) (2025-2028)

Area
  - Total: 321.418 km^{2} (124.100 sq mi)
- Elevation: 415 m (1,362 ft)

Population (2022)
  - Total: 12,770
  - Density: 39.73/km^{2} (102.9/sq mi)
- Demonym: Mantenopolitano (Brazilian Portuguese)
- Time zone: UTC-03:00 (Brasília Time)
- Postal code: 29770-000, 29772-000, 29776-000, 29778-000
- HDI (2010): 0.657 – medium
- Website: mantenopolis.es.gov.br

Mantenópolis is a municipality located in the Brazilian state of Espírito Santo. Its population was 15,503 (2020) and its area is 321 km^{2} (124 sq mi). It is a small town located in a valley with green mountains rising above it. It has a central square with municipal offices- e.g., police, public works, and school within a short walking distance of each other. There are many farms with livestock and crops in the neighboring countryside. An extraordinarily large number of people from Mantenopolis who migrate to the United States reside on the Island of Martha's Vineyard in the state of Massachusetts.

== See also ==
- List of municipalities in Espírito Santo
