= São Gabriel da Palha =

Coordinates: 19°01′01″S 40°32′09″W

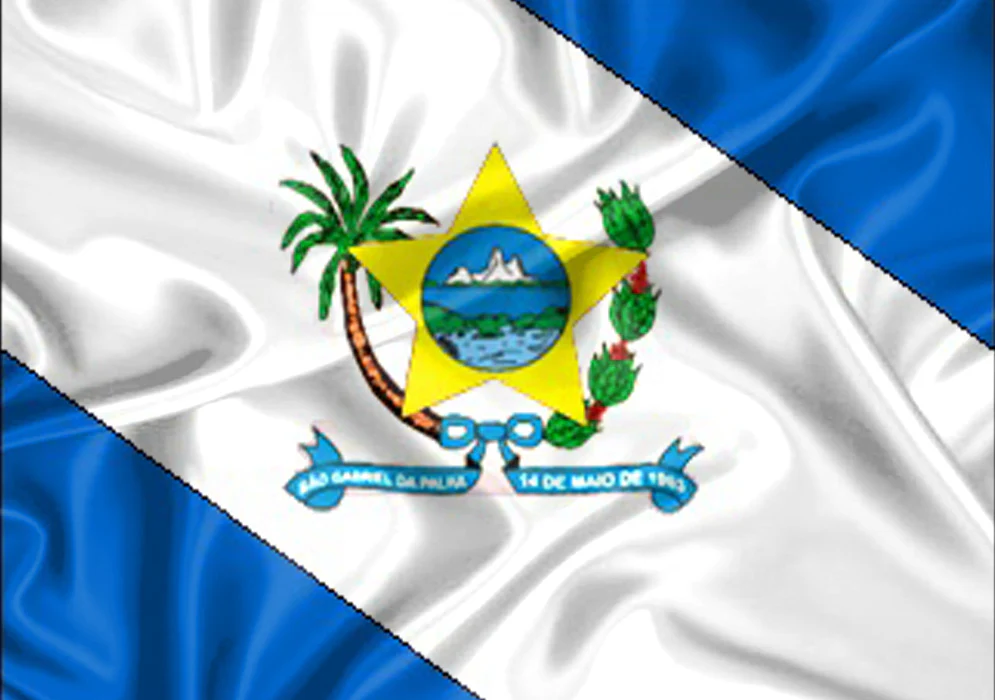
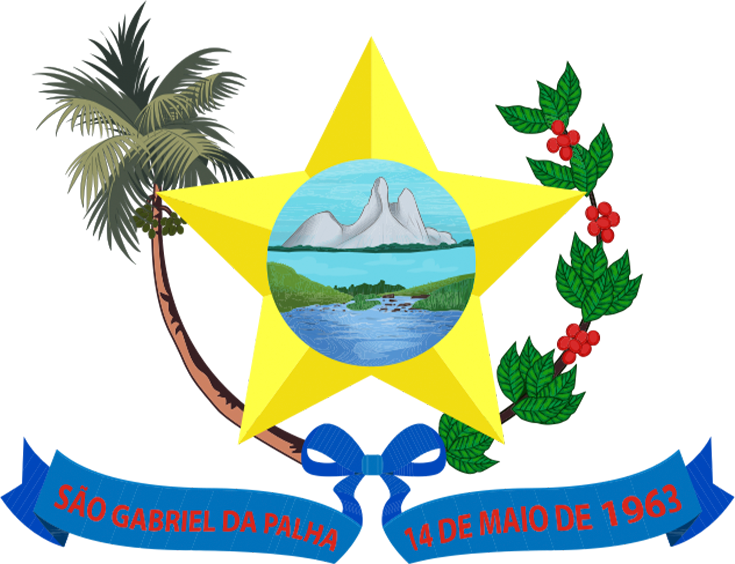
- Flag Coat of arms

- Established: 14 May 1963; 62 years ago

Area
  - Total: 432.814 km^{2} (167.110 sq mi)

Population (2020)
  - Total: 38,522
  - Density: 89.004/km^{2} (230.52/sq mi)

São Gabriel da Palha is a municipality located in the Brazilian state of Espírito Santo. Its population was 38,522 (2020) and its area is 433 km^{2} (167 sq mi).

== See also ==
- List of municipalities in Espírito Santo
