= Barra de São Francisco =

- Municipality
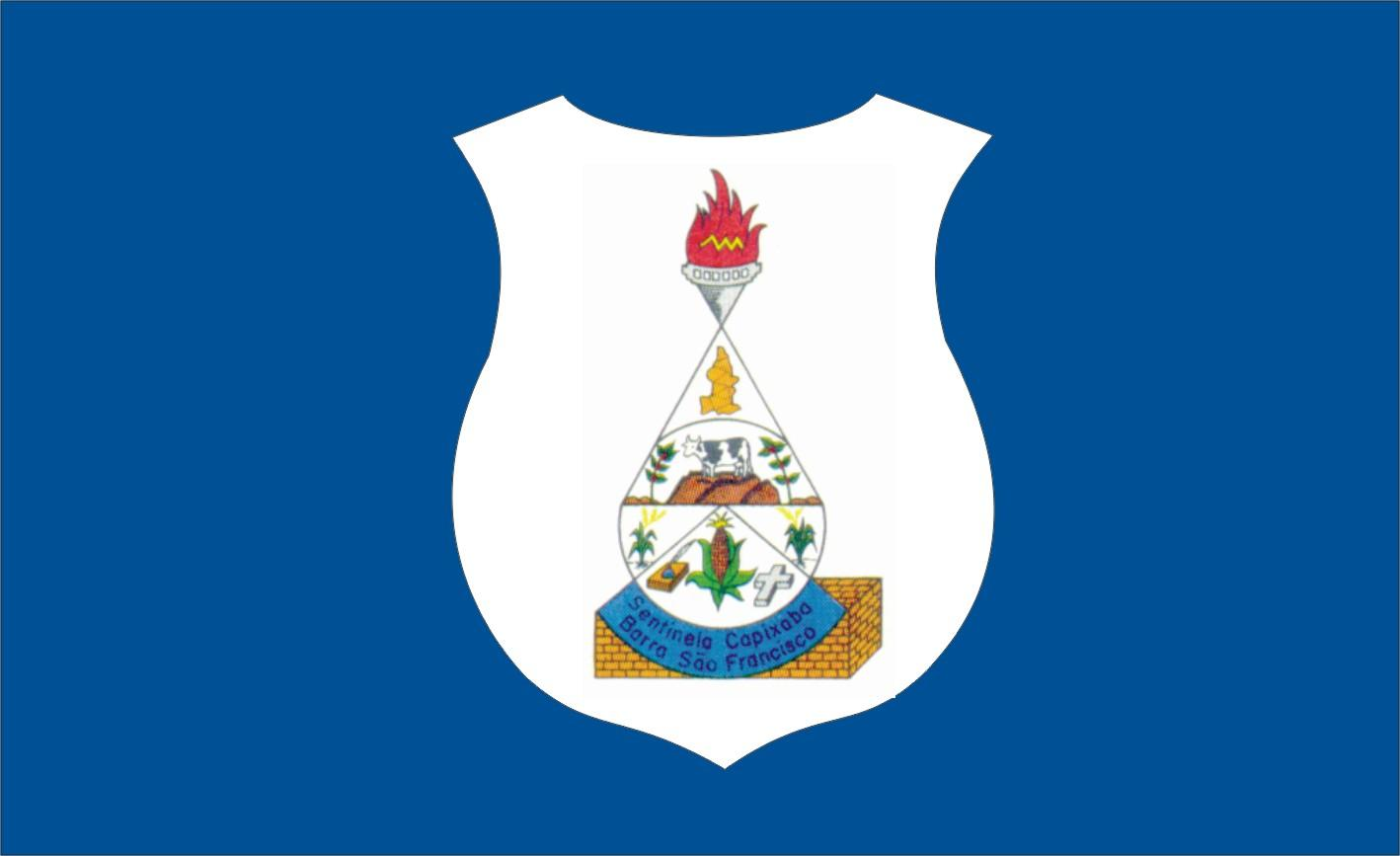
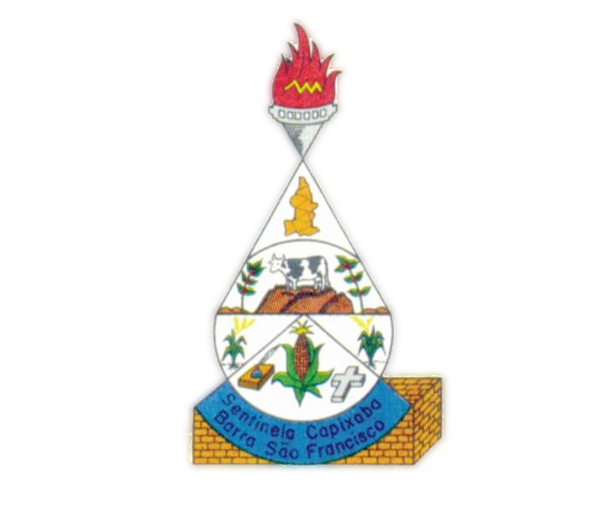
- Flag Coat of arms

- Location in Brazil
- Coordinates: 18°45′18″S 40°53′27″W
- Country: Brazil
- Region: Southeast
- State: Espírito Santo
- Founded: September 8, 1551

Area
  - Total: 933.747 km^{2} (360.522 sq mi)

Population (2020)
  - Total: 44,979
- Time zone: UTC−3 (BRT)
- Website: Vitória, Espírito Santo

Barra de São Francisco is a municipality located in the Brazilian state of Espírito Santo. Its population was 44,979 (2020) and its area is 945 km^{2} (365 sq mi).
