= Caetés forest =

Forest in Brazil

Coordinates: 20°30′43″S 41°01′59″W

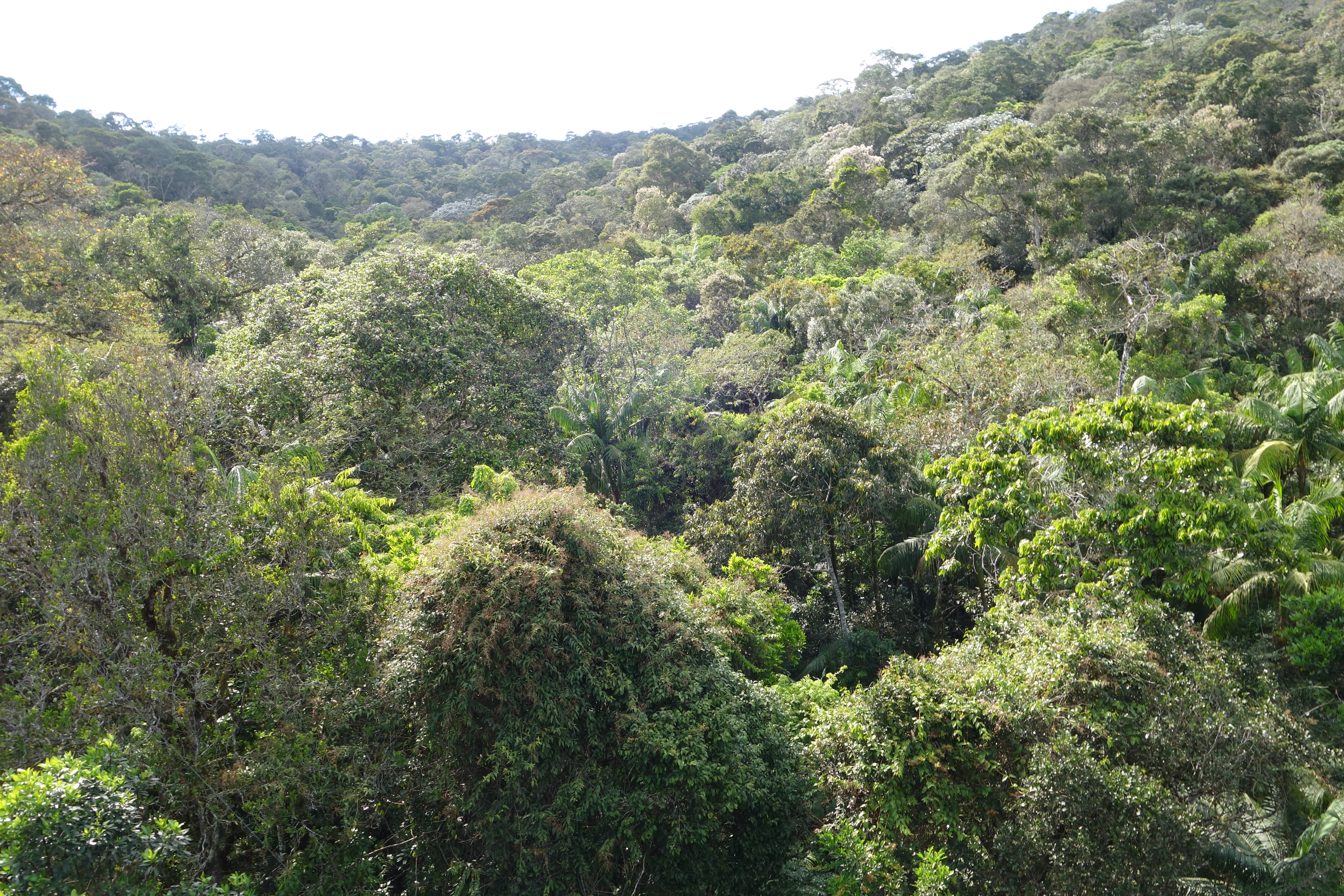
View from the forest tower in the Reserva Kaetés

The Caetés forest (Portuguese Mata de Caetés or Mata dos Caetés) is an area in the Brazilian state of Espírito Santo that preserves larger stretches of old-growth in the Atlantic rainforest. The area lies within the municipalities of Castelo, Vargem Alta, Domingos Martins, Venda Nova do Imigrante, and Alfredo Chaves. The Caetés forest is known for its population of the cherry-throated tanager, a critically endangered bird confirmed in the area in 2003, and of other critically endangered species. The forest is threatened by deforestation. A proposal to establish a public nature reserve to protect the entire forest was abandoned by the local government in 2015 due to local opposition. Instead, two smaller, private nature reserves have since been established that protect parts of the forest, the Águia Branca Private Reserve and the Reserva Kaetés.

== Geography ==
Caetés forest in Espírito Santo, Brazil

The Caetés forest is a mountainous area of approximately 30 km² and lies within the municipalities of Castelo, Vargem Alta, Domingos Martins, Venda Nova do Imigrante, and Alfredo Chaves, in Espírito Santo, Brazil. The forest lies in-between the Forno Grande State Park and the Pedra Azul State Park. It still preserves larger connected stretches of old-growth rainforest, which is significant given the large-scale deforestation elsewhere in Espírito Santo. The area has been partially deforested, with plantations of exotic trees interspersed within original forest, and is cut by several roads, including a highway. It is partially protected by two private nature reserves, the Águia Branca Private Reserve, which is 16.88 km^{2} (6.52 sq mi) in area, and the Reserva Kaetés, which is 6.67 km^{2} (2.58 sq mi) in area. The remaining areas are part of fazendas belonging to private landowners. The entire Caetés forest was included in the Pedra Azul–Forno Grande ecological corridor, a priority area for conservation recognised by the state. It is also part of an Important Bird Area (IBA-07) recognized by BirdLife International.

== Conservation ==
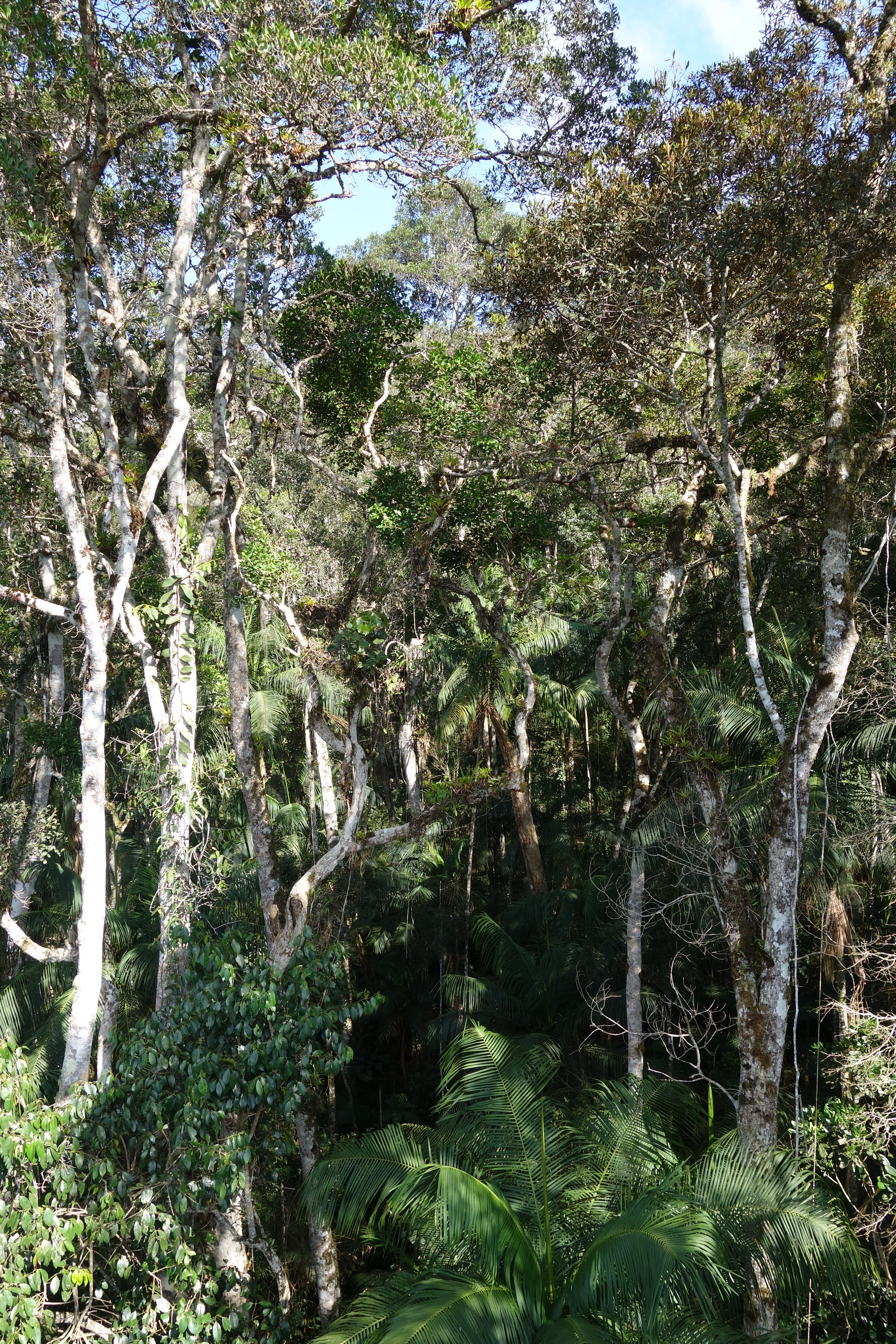
Rainforest in the Reserva Kaetés

In 2005, the cherry-throated tanager, a critically endangered bird that had just been rediscovered in 1998, was confirmed in the area, sparkling conservation efforts. From 2011, the nonprofit organization SAVE Brasil pushed for a large public nature reserve in the Mata de Caetés. The state government approved the project in 2015 but later abandoned it due to local opposition. Instead of a public reserve, a smaller private nature reserve, the Águia Branca Private Reserve, was established in 2017 to protect parts of the area in which the tanagers occur. In 2021, the Marcos Daniel Institute, supported by several nonprofits, created a second private reserve, the Reserva Kaetés.

=== Águia Branca Private Reserve ===
91% of the Águia Branca Private Reserve is covered by old-growth rainforest, and protects critically endangered species such as the cherry-throated tananger.

=== Reserva Kaetés ===
The Reserva Kaetés lies 1,223 m (4,012 ft) above sea level with average temperatures between 11 and 30 °C (52 and 86 °F), and minimum temperatures close to 0 °C (32 °F). It was established to protect the cherry-throated tanager, but also protects other species such as the critically endangered catfish Trichogenes claviger, which only occurs in the Caetés forest; the vulnerable maned sloth; and the endangered plant Philodendron spiritus-sancti.
