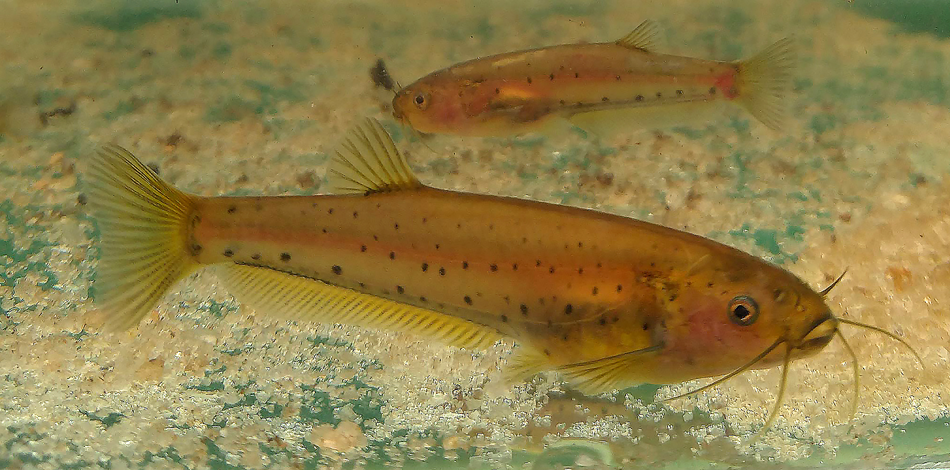
- Adult individuals

Conservation status
- Critically Endangered (IUCN 3.1)

Scientific classification
- Kingdom: Animalia
- Phylum: Chordata
- Class: Actinopterygii
- Order: Siluriformes
- Family: Trichomycteridae
- Subfamily: Trichogeninae
- Genus: Trichogenes
- Species: T. claviger

Binomial name
- Trichogenes claviger de Pinna, Helmer, Britski & Nunes, 2010
- Map of Brazil showing the only occurrence

= Trichogenes claviger =

Species of fish

Trichogenes claviger, also known as the Caetés catfish (Portuguese: bagre-de-caetés), is a critically endangered species of ray-finned fish belonging to the family Trichomycteridae, the pencil catfishes. This species is endemic to streams in the Atlantic Forest of Brazil. It was discovered early in 2010 and scientifically described later that year. One of three species within the genus Trichogenes, it is restricted to an area of 16 km^{2} (6.2 sq mi) in the Caetés forest, a mountainous area in the Brazilian state of Espírito Santo. When discovered, the rainforest in which it occurs was unprotected and threatened by deforestation. A private nature reserve has since been established, allowing visitors to see the fish in its habitat.

A small fish, T. claviger is up to 51 mm (2.0 in) in length. A series of black dots runs along the side of the body, distinguishing it from related species. Males have a bony protrusion from the gill area (the opercular process) that is elongated and club-like, a feature that inspired the name of the species (claviger – 'club-bearing'). The opercular process in T. claviger is the only known secondary sex characteristic in pencil catfishes, and might have evolved for sexual signaling; it is also used by the fish to climb up net walls when caught. The mouth is terminal (faces forwards rather than being upturned or downturned); this feature is also found in the species' closest relative, T. beagle, but absent in all other members of their family. This fish is known to gulp air from the water surface; when carrying air, the body tilts downward. The species lives in small, shaded, and slow-moving streams in the rainforest, and mostly feeds on insects that have fallen on the water surface. It is the only fish in its habitat.

== Taxonomy ==
Trichogenes claviger was discovered in the summer of 2010 by biologists during an assessment for environmental licensing purposes in a remnant rainforest in Castelo, Espírito Santo. The biologists collected 18 specimens which became part of the collections of the Mello Leitão Museum of Biology in Santa Teresa, and the Museum of Zoology of the University of São Paulo in São Paulo. The holotype (the specimen on which the species is based; collection number MBML 3289) is an adult male. The species description was published later in 2010 by the Brazilian ichthyologist Mário C. C. de Pinna and colleagues.

The generic name Trichogenes is composed of the Greek words thrix meaning 'hair' (referring to its family, the Trichomycteridae) and genes meaning 'birth' (referring to the genus Helogenes due to the superficial resemblance to it). The specific name claviger is Latin for 'club-bearing' and refers to the distinctive club-shaped protrusion of the operculum (a series of bones that cover the gills) that is seen in males. A common name for the species is the Caetés catfish (Portuguese: bagre-de-caetés).

T. claviger is one of three known species within the genus Trichogenes, and the second to be discovered and described. The first species, T. longipinnis, was described in 1983 from a local population in a remnant rainforest between Rio de Janeiro and São Paulo. Before T. claviger was discovered, T. longipinnis was considered to be unique – a distinct fish not closely related to any other neotropical freshwater fish. In 2020, a third species, T. beagle, was described from three specimens found in a freezer in the Federal University of Viçosa; these specimens lack any documentation, and the place of occurrence of the species is unknown. This new species is probably the closest relative of T. claviger, but the two species probably did not separate recently given their numerous morphological differences. Within its family, the Trichomycteridae (pencil catfishes), the genus Trichogenes is considered to be basal (early diverging) because of its many plesiomorphic (ancestral) features. The genus is most closely related to the Copionodontinae, which are endemic to the Chapada Diamantina plateau in northeastern Brazil.

== Description ==
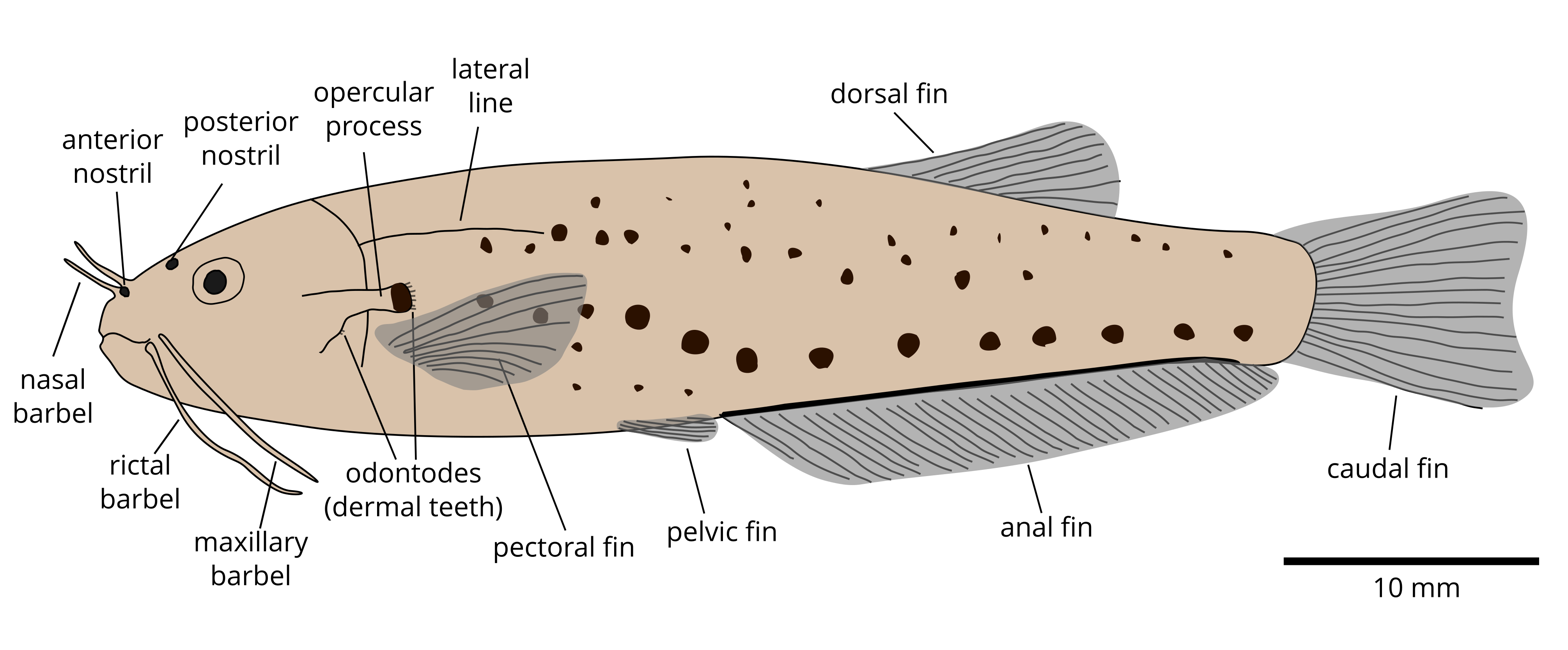
Schematic diagram showing its anatomical landmarks

T. claviger is a small fish; 18 collected specimens were between 16 and 51 mm (0.63 and 2.01 in) in standard length (measured from the snout to the end of the vertebral column). The body is deeper than it is wide, being deepest at the abdomen and tapering towards the tail. This results in convex upper and lower margins when viewed from the side, which differ from the more parallel upper and lower margins of T. longipinnis. The pectoral fin is relatively large and consists of 9 or 10 fin rays. The pelvic fin has 5 or 6 rays. The dorsal fin is comparatively small and situated closer to the caudal fin than to the snout. The anal fin is extensive with 32 to 35 unbranched rays – an extensive anal fin is also seen in T. longipinnis and T. beagle and distinguishes these species from other species in their family. The lower margin of the anal fin can be straight or convex. The upper half of the caudal fin has 9 or 10 rays, and the lower half has 6 or 7 rays.

The top of the head and the fins are yellowish and the underside of the body is whitish. The body behind the head sports dark spots on its sides that are round to oval and of various sizes. The largest of the spots are arranged in a continuous line that starts at the gills and runs obliquely down to near the origin of the anal fin, and then continues parallel to the anal fin to the base of the caudal fin. The spots are more numerous in T. longipinnis; they are small and do not form a line in T. beagle. There is also a distinct dark line just above, and parallel to, the anal fin; this line is also found in T. beagle but absent in T. longipinnis.

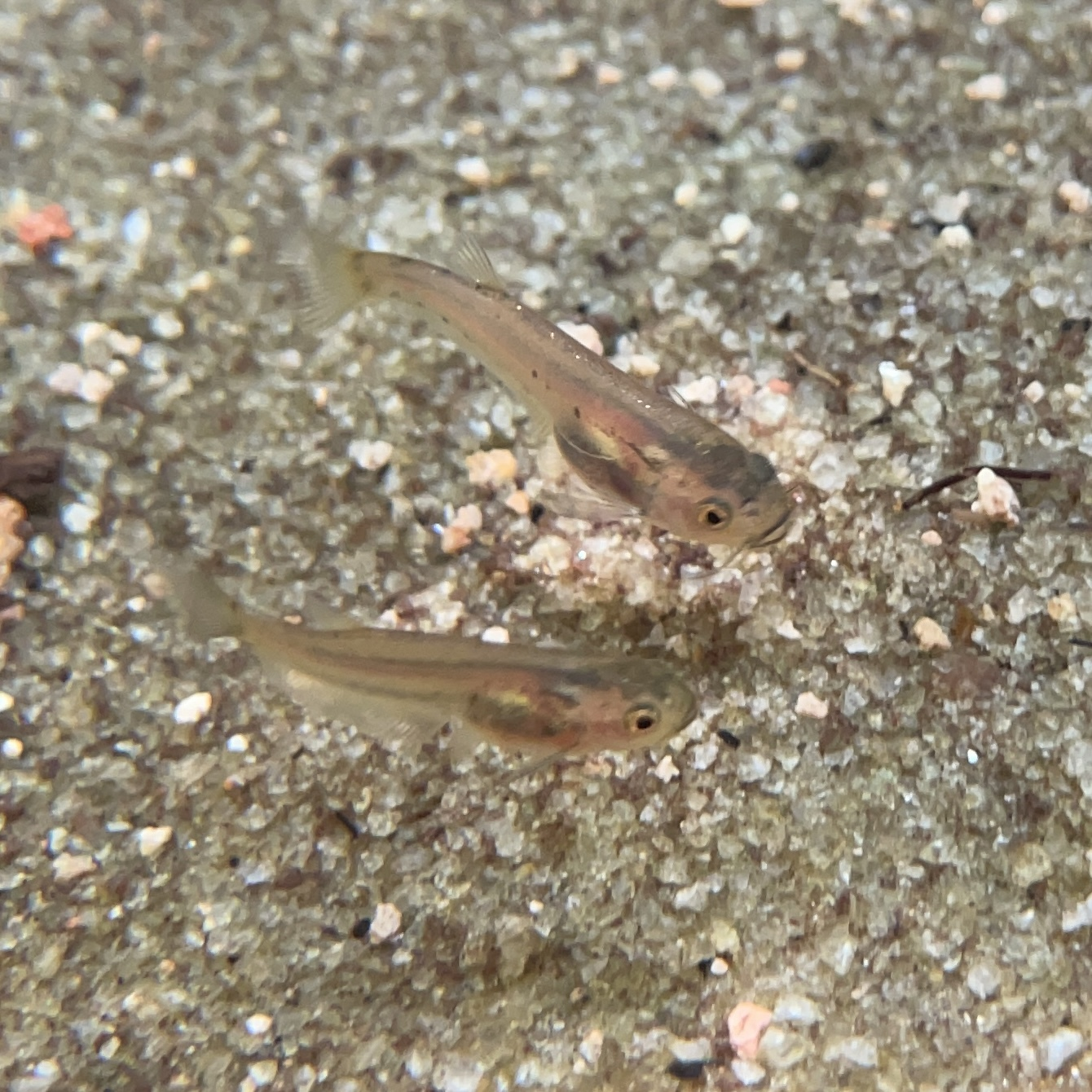
Individuals above the sandy bed of the stream

The head is approximately three-quarters as deep as long. In side view, the eyes are located slightly closer to the front end of the head than to the rear end, and in top view are closer to the outer margin of the head than to the body midline. There are three pairs of barbels (whisker-like sensory organs near the mouth) – the down-facing maxillary and rictal barbels and the upward-facing nasal barbels. The maxillary and rictal barbels both originate at the rear end of the lips, and the former reaches up to the base of the pectoral fin. The nasal barbels reach the front margin of the eye when drawn to it. Unlike the other members of its genus, T. claviger lacks the barbular bone, a bone located in front of the eye that is only found in trichomycterids. The mouth is terminal (facing forwards rather than being upturned or downturned), a trait also found in T. beagle but absent in all other members of their family. On each side of the skull, there are 19 to 23 teeth in the dentary of the lower jaw and 20 to 22 teeth in the premaxilla of the upper jaw. The teeth are bilobed and arranged in two rows; the teeth of the inner row are smaller.

The operculum possesses two patches of odontodes (dermal teeth). The largest patch is located at the end of a pronounced opercular process (protrusion). In males, this process is very elongated and club-like, unlike in any other trichomycterid, and inspired the name of the species. The lateral line is short, consisting of a succession of four or five tubules (channels) that reaches from the back of the head up to the level of the rear margin of the pectoral fin. The spine invariably consists of 35 vertebrae; T. longipinnis has 38 or 39 and the three known specimens of T. beagle have 36. The neural spines (upper ends) of the foremost four vertebrae are bifurcated, and a claw-like process is present in front of each. Both features are unique for T. claviger and T. beagle and are possibly adaptations for feeding in the middle of the water column or at the water surface, as they increase the attachment surface for the dorsal musculature.

== Distribution and habitat ==
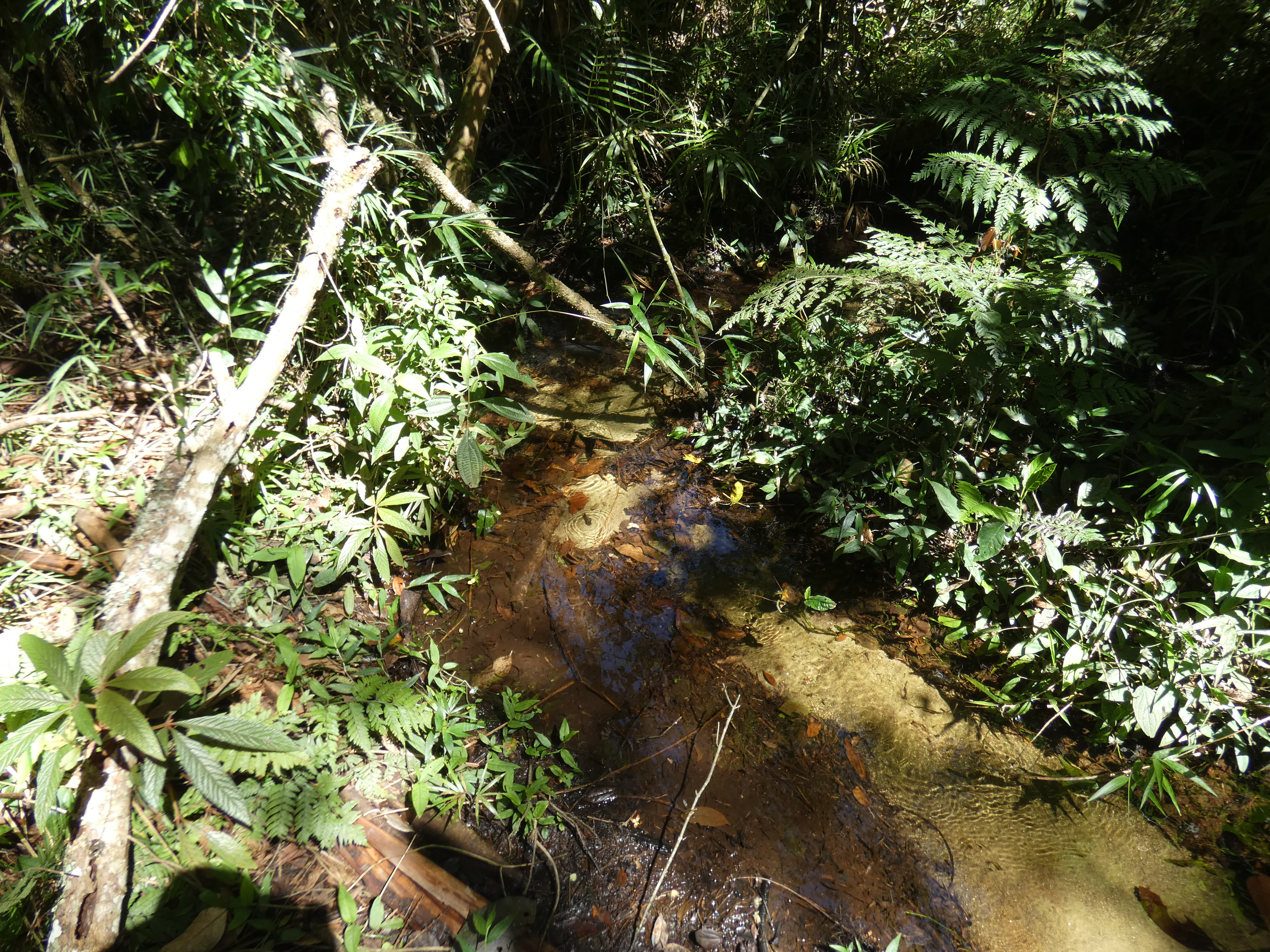
The type locality of Trichogenes claviger. The fish can be seen at the bottom of the photograph.

T. claviger is a local endemic of the Atlantic Forest, the second largest rainforest of the Americas, and one of the most biodiverse regions in the world. Originally, this forest covered 1.6 million hectares (4 million acres), mostly in Brazil but extending south into parts of Paraguay and Argentina. The species is only known from the Caetés forest, a remnant of the Atlantic Forest in the Brazilian state of Espírito Santo. Here, the fish lives in small streams that are part of the catchment area of the Itapemirim River, which is isolated from other catchment areas. The type locality (the locality where the specimen was collected on which the species is based on) is a small shaded stream named Picada Comprida at an altitude of around 1,150 m (3,770 ft). It is located within primary, mountainous rainforest interspersed with plantations of exotic trees. The occurrence of the species in the immediate surroundings of the site appeared to be patchy. A second locality at a different stream was discovered in 2019, 4 km (2.5 mi) away from the type locality, and a third locality was discovered by a local farmer in 2023. Together, these localities cover an area of over 16 km^{2} (6.2 sq mi).

At the type locality, the stream containing the fish was about 30 cm (12 in) deep, slow flowing and had brown but clear water. The stream bed was sandy but partly covered with dead leaves and other organic material. The second locality, which was discovered in 2019, was examined during dry season when the water level was low. Here, the fish were only found within two deeper pools 100 m (330 ft) apart from each other; the stream was flowing slowly and within secondary forest. The habitat is markedly different from that of T. longipinnis, which favours steep mountain streams with strong currents.

== Ecology and biology ==
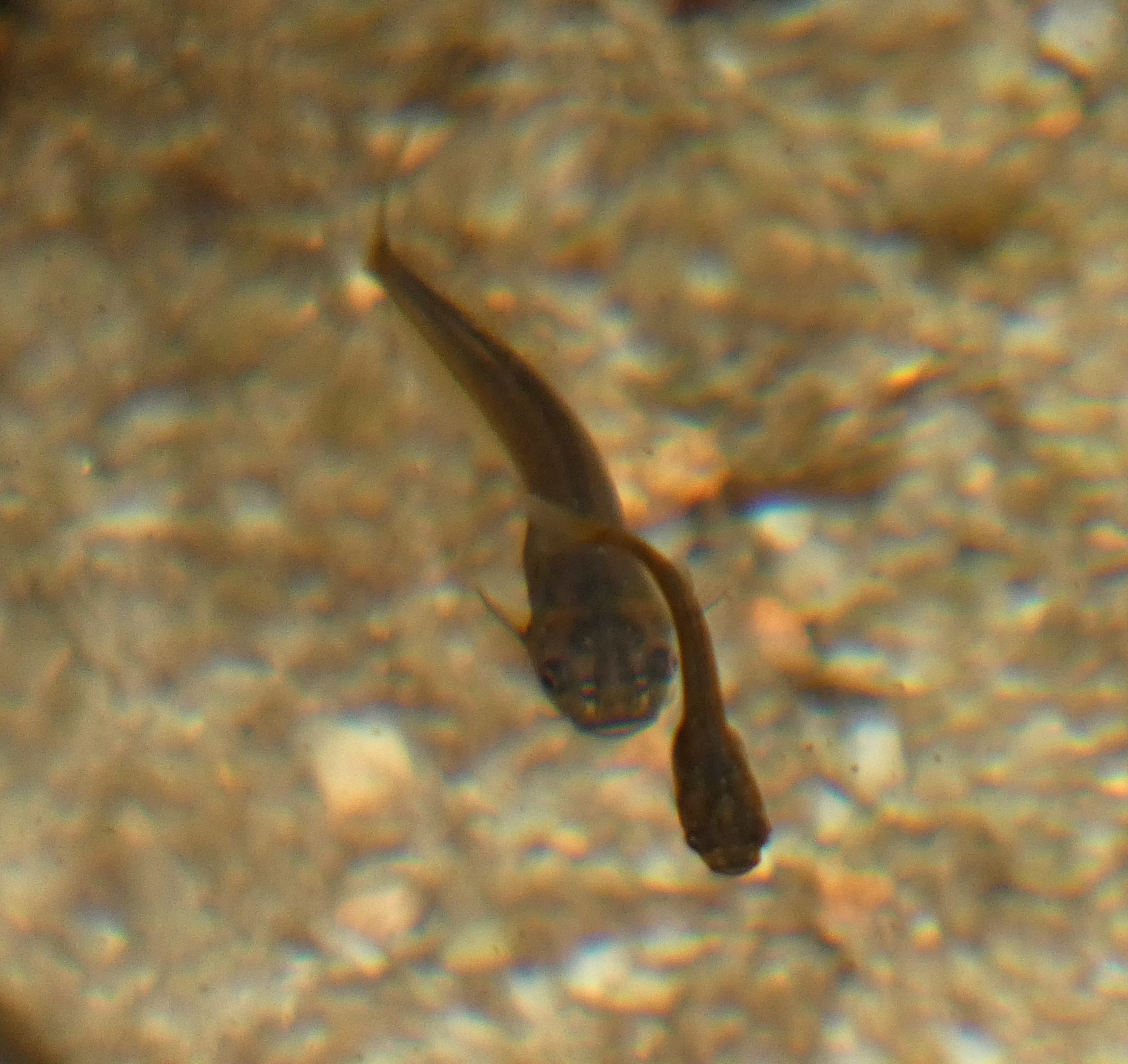
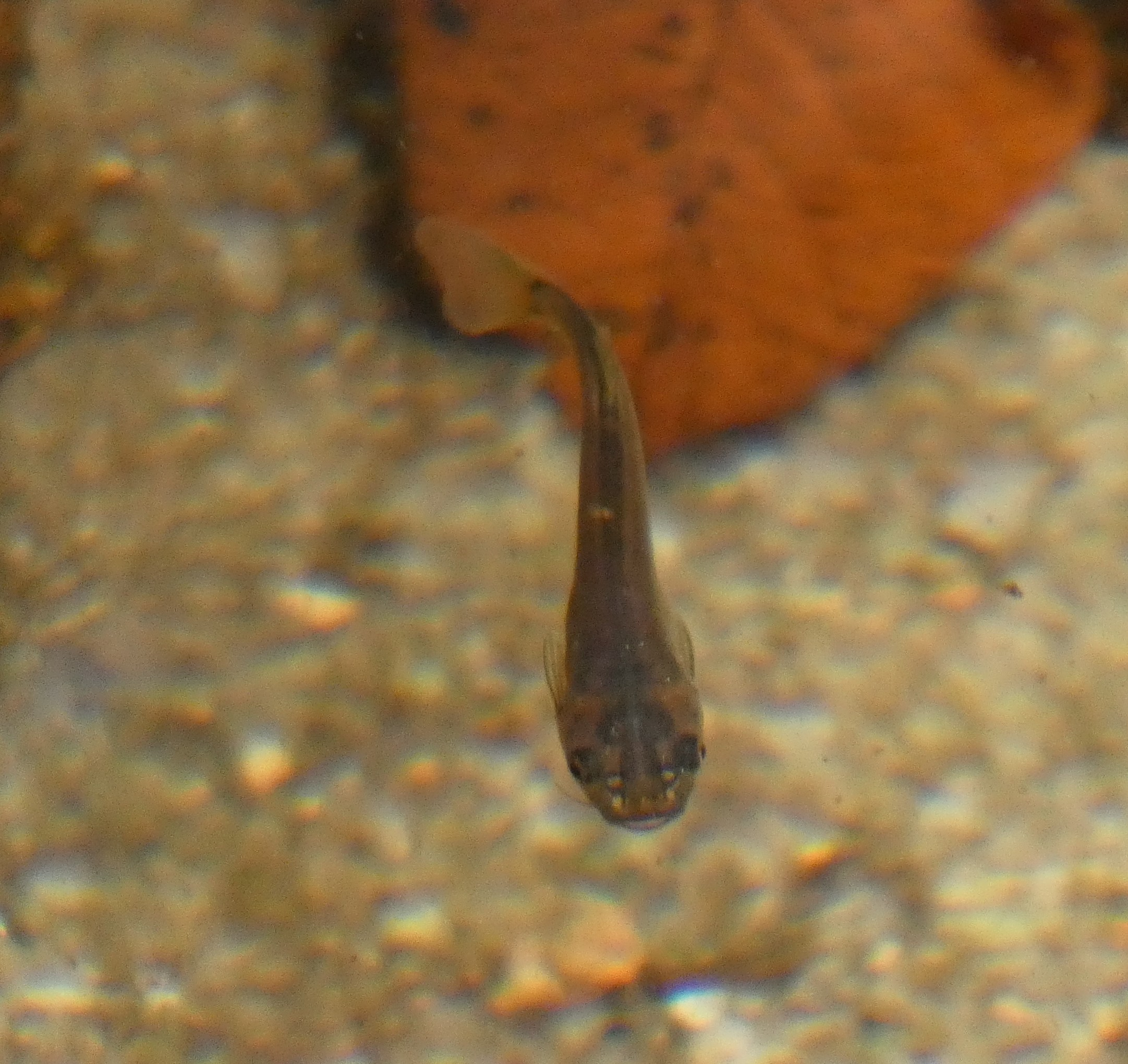
Adult and juvenile (left) and adult (right)

The fish tend to dwell in the middle of the water column. The species does not solely rely on its gills for breathing but will also gulp air from the water surface and release air bubbles afterwards; such accessory air breathing is common in trichomycterids and loricarioids. Individuals carrying air will swim with their bodies tilted downward. As with T. longipinnis, the species is probably diurnal (active during the day). It is the only species of fish that occurs in its habitat, and it is unknown what prevents other species from entering these habitats. It mostly feeds on terrestrial arthropods that have fallen onto the water surface. An analysis of gut contents revealed that terrestrial insects such as hymenopterans and beetles are taken. Among the aquatic prey, black fly larvae, which attach themselves near the water margin and close to the water surface, are more commonly consumed than chironomid larvae.

Juveniles differ from adults in having larger eyes, a much shorter snout, a narrower head with a strongly sloping upper surface, and a prognathous mouth (i.e., the lower jaw is larger than the upper jaw). Such marked differences probably indicate differences in ecology between juveniles and adults. In T. longipinnis, juveniles and adults are more similar.

The conspicuous opercular process is short in females but elongated in males, and therefore sexually dimorphic – the only known secondary sex characteristic in the Trichomycteridae. In their species description, de Pinna and colleagues suggested that the function of this process is sexual signalling, as the process is movable and bears a black spot on its end. Visual perception appears to be important in Trichogenes species, and the related T. longipinnis has been demonstrated to rely solely on sight to detect prey. Several other neotropical freshwater fishes also have a movable black-tipped structure somewhere along the body; this feature therefore evolved independently several times. When caught in a net, the fish may use their opercular processes to climb up the net walls.

== Status, threats, and conservation ==
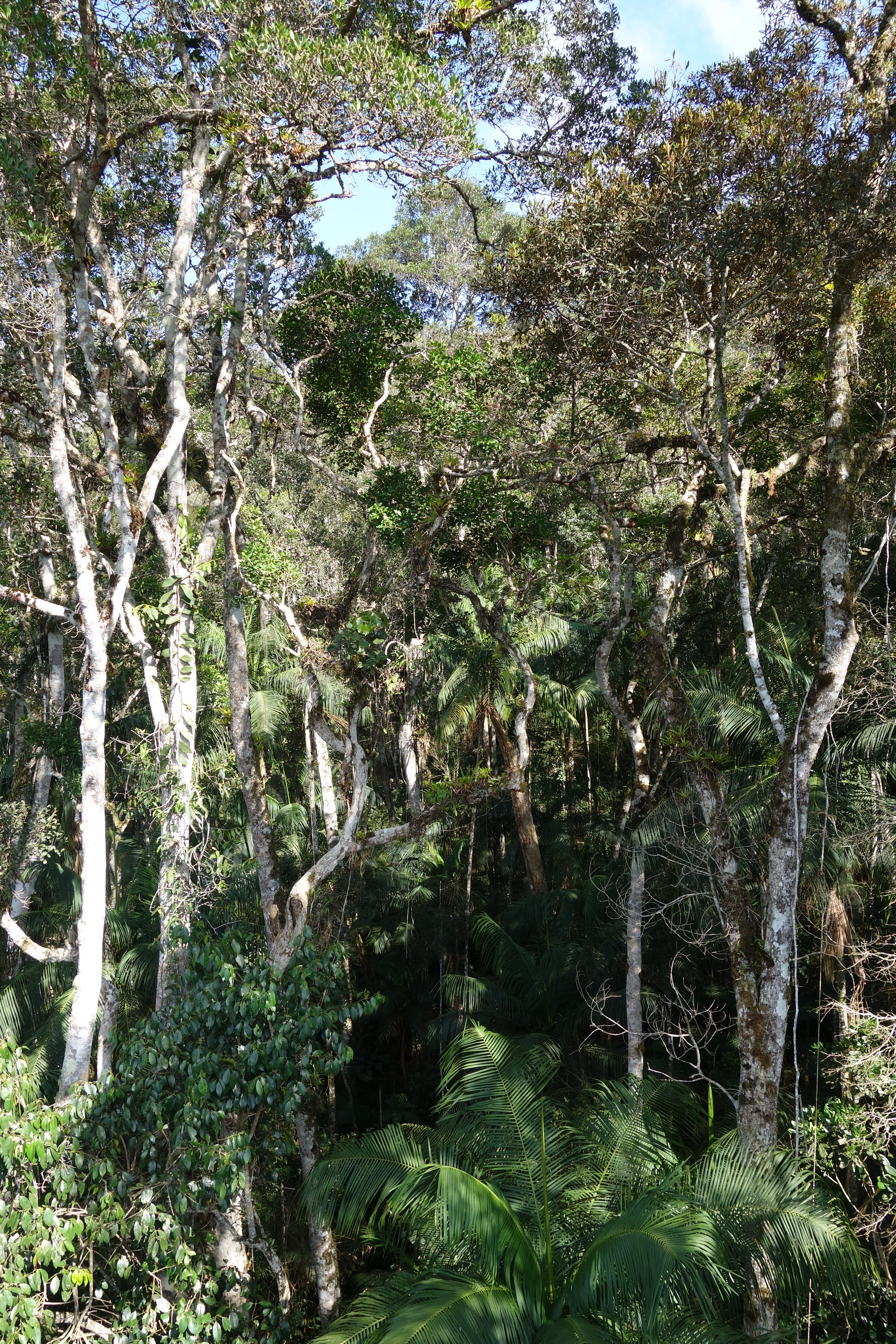
Rainforest in the Reserva Kaetés at the type locality of T. claviger

T. claviger has been classified as critically endangered by the International Union for Conservation of Nature (IUCN) since 2018. Since 2014, it is also listed as critically endangered in the Livro Vermelho, the Regional Red List of Brazil. It is one of about 20 threatened freshwater fish species in Espírito Santo. The main threats are its extremely small range and habitat loss due to deforestation, as this species depends on forests.

The species was discovered in 2010 on land of the Forno Grande farm, which was owned by a larger corporation. Much of this land was still forested and is part of the Caetés forest, a larger complex of remnant rainforest. In this forest complex, a population of a critically endangered species of bird, the cherry-throated tanager, had been discovered by a birdwatching party in 2003; this population is one of only two known. From 2011, the nonprofit organization SAVE Brasil pushed for a large public nature reserve in the Caetés forest. The state government approved the project in 2015 but later abandoned it due to local opposition. Instead of a public reserve, a smaller private nature reserve, the Águia Branca Private Reserve, was established in 2017 to protect 16.88 km^{2} (6.52 sq mi) of the Caetés forest, which, however, did not include the type locality of T. claviger. The farm owners frequently denied access to the land, and in 2019, de Pinna and colleagues were forced to search for another locality outside of the farm to carry out further research. Such a site was detected on the land of another farm 3 km (1.9 mi) away from the type locality. In 2021, the Marcos Daniel Institute, supported by several nonprofits, acquired 6.67 km^{2} (2.58 sq mi) of the Forno Grande farm to create a second private reserve, the Reserva Kaetés, including the type locality of T. claviger. The type locality is now accessible to visitors, and the fish are easy to see. The entire Caetés forest is part of the Pedra Azul–Forno Grande ecological corridor, a priority area for conservation recognized by the state.

The Reserva Kaetés is managed by the saíra-apunhalada project of the Marcos Daniel Institute (saíra-apunhalada is the Portuguese name of the cherry-throated tanager). A 2020 survey revealed negative attitudes towards the remaining forests and mistrust towards law enforcement agencies in the local populace; most locals did not know about the cherry-throated tanager, and some believed that it was introduced to the area to enforce conservation of forests. An action plan for the protection of the tanager, published in 2021, proposed to use the tanager as a flagship species to educate and involve local communities, among other conservation actions. As a result, locals became aware of the existence of the fish, and new localities of the species have been found within the reserve. In 2023, a farmer discovered the species at a new location outside the reserve, 5 km (3.1 mi) from the type locality, that contained hundreds of individuals and increased the known range of the species.
