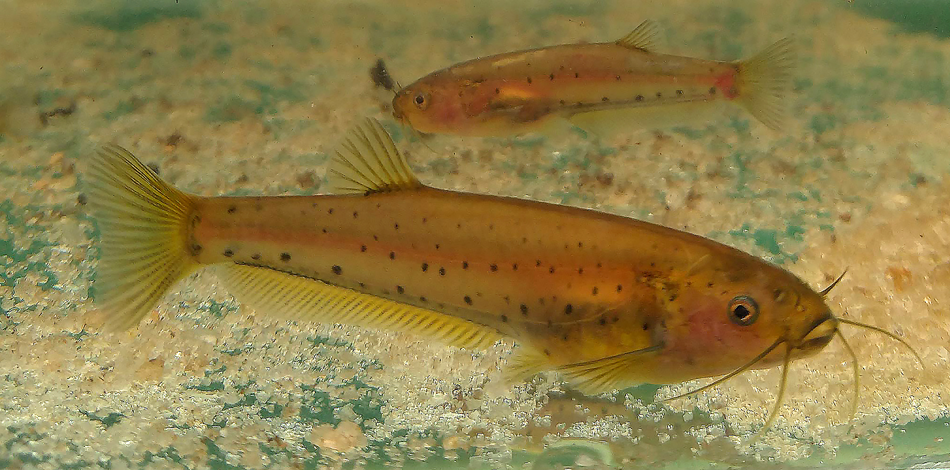
- Trichogenes claviger

Scientific classification
- Kingdom: Animalia
- Phylum: Chordata
- Class: Actinopterygii
- Order: Siluriformes
- Family: Trichomycteridae
- Subfamily: Trichogeninae; Isbrücker, 1986
- Genus: Trichogenes; Britski & Ortega, 1983

Type species
- Trichogenes longipinnis Britski & Ortega, 1983

= Trichogenes =

Genus of fishes

Trichogenes is a genus of freshwater ray-finned fish belonging to the family Trichomycteridae, the pencil and parasitic catfishes. It is currently the only genus in the monogeneric subfamily Trichogeninae. These catfishes are found in South America.

A third species, T. beagle, was described in 2020 from archival material of unknown origin. The occurrence of the new species in the wild is unknown.

== Etymology ==
The name Trichogenes is composed of the words "Tricho", referring to its family, the Trichomycteridae, and "genes", referring to the genus Helogenes due to its superficial resemblance to the latter.

== Distribution ==
Trichogenes species are endemic to southeastern Brazil.

== Species ==
Trichogenes contains the following valid species:

- Trichogenes beagle de Pinna, V. Reis & Britski, 2020
- Trichogenes claviger de Pinna, Helmer, Britski & Nunes, 2010
- Trichogenes longipinnis Britski & Ortega, 1983
