= Alfredo Chaves =

- Municipality
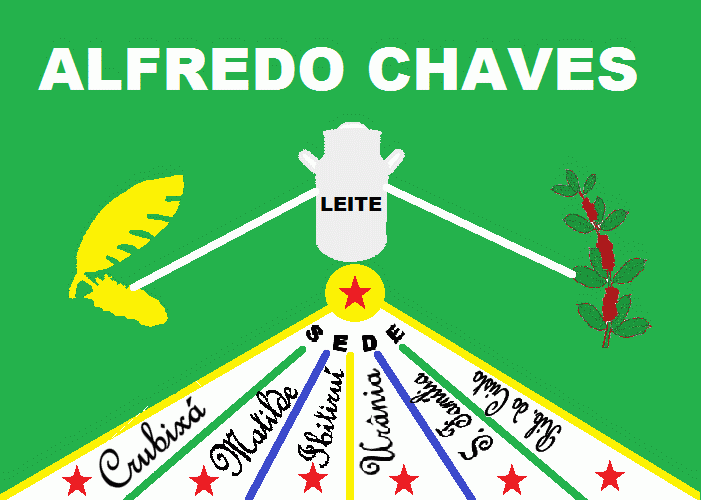
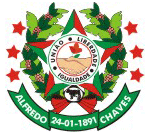
- Flag Coat of arms

- Location in Brazil
- Coordinates: 20°38′6″S 40°45′0″W
- Country: Brazil
- Region: Southeast
- State: Espírito Santo

Area
  - Total: 616 km^{2} (238 sq mi)

Population (2020)
  - Total: 14,636
  - Density: 23.8/km^{2} (61.5/sq mi)
- Time zone: UTC−3 (BRT)

Alfredo Chaves is a municipality in the state of Espírito Santo, Brazil. It is 60 km southwest of the state capital, Vitória. Its population was 14,636 (2020) and its area is 615.79 km^{2} (237.76 sq mi).

== Geography ==
Located in the southeast of the state, it borders (east) Anchieta and Guarapari, (north) Marechal Floriano and Domingos Martins, (west) Vargem Alta, (south) Iconha and Rio Novo do Sul.

The municipality is mountainous, though not very high in general. Its highest peak is Trancenco Peak at 1,050 m above sea level. The town of Alfredo Chaves lies at 10 m above sea level.

== Economy ==
The economy is mainly based on livestock, including cows (for milk) and chickens. In agriculture, coffee and banana plantations play an important role.

== Climate ==
Climate data for Alfredo Chaves (1981–2010)
Month	Jan	Feb	Mar	Apr	May	Jun	Jul	Aug	Sep	Oct	Nov	Dec	Year
Mean daily maximum °C (°F)	32.8 (91.0)	33.7 (92.7)	32.3 (90.1)	30.5 (86.9)	28.7 (83.7)	27.6 (81.7)	27.2 (81.0)	27.8 (82.0)	28.1 (82.6)	29.3 (84.7)	30.4 (86.7)	31.6 (88.9)	30.0 (86.0)
Mean daily minimum °C (°F)	21.8 (71.2)	21.9 (71.4)	21.7 (71.1)	20.5 (68.9)	18.8 (65.8)	17.5 (63.5)	17.2 (63.0)	17.4 (63.3)	18.3 (64.9)	19.9 (67.8)	20.6 (69.1)	21.5 (70.7)	19.8 (67.6)
Source: Instituto Nacional de Meteorologia
