= Marechal Floriano =

- Municipality
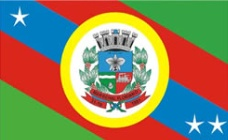
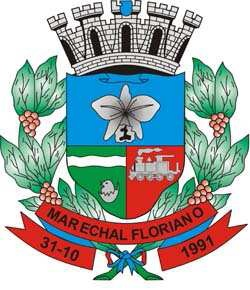
- Flag Coat of arms

- Location in Espírito Santo state

- Location in Brazil
- Coordinates: 20°24′46″S 40°40′58″W
- Country: Brazil
- Region: Southeast
- State: Espírito Santo

Area
  - Total: 285 km^{2} (110 sq mi)

Population (2020)
  - Total: 16,920
  - Density: 59.4/km^{2} (154/sq mi)
- Time zone: UTC−3 (BRT)

Marechal Floriano is the capital of a municipality of the same name in the state of Espírito Santo, Brazil. Once part of the municipality of Domingos Martins, the town of Marechal Floriano separated on October 31, 1991, becoming the capital of its own municipality. Marechal Floriano is just over 60 km from Vitória, the capital of the state, and situated in the southeastern Brazilian Highlands. The surrounding municipalities are to the north, Domingos Martins, and to the south, Guarapari and Alfredo Chaves. The capital stands at 544 meters above sea level. Local average temperatures vary between 6 and 30 degrees Celsius.

Its population was 16,920 (2020), and its area is 285 km^{2}.

Known locally and promoted as the "Town of Orchids", it cultivates and sells many such plants. It was given its name in honor of Field Marshal (in Portuguese: "Marechal") Floriano Peixoto, the first vice-president of the Brazilian Republic.
