= Trichogenes beagle =

Scientific classification
- Kingdom: Animalia
- Phylum: Chordata
- Class: Actinopterygii
- Order: Siluriformes
- Family: Trichomycteridae
- Genus: Trichogenes
- Species: T. beagle

Binomial name
- Trichogenes beagle de Pinna, V. Reis & Britski, 2020

Species of fish

Trichogenes beagle is a species of freshwater ray-finned fish belonging to the family Trichomycteridae, the pencil and parasitic catfishes. This catfish is thought to be endemic to southeastern Brazil.

== Taxonomy ==
Trichogenes beagle was first formally described in 2020 by the Brazilian ichthyologists Mário Cesar Cardoso de Pinna, Vinícius José Carvalho Reis and Heraldo A. Britski. The species was described from a type series of 3 specimens which were preserved, frozen, in the Laboratory of Molecular Systematics – Beagle at the Department of Animal Biology at the Federal University of Viçosa, which were found without any data about the locations or dates they were collected from. When researchers searched for this species, they discovered another new species in its genus, T. claviger. This species was classified in the genus Trichogenes, a basal genus of Loricaroid catfishes, which is the only genus in the subfamily Trichogeninae which is classified within the family Trichomycteridae.

== Etymology ==
Trichogenes beagle is classified within the genus Trichogenes, this name combines tricho-, from the family Trichomycteridae, with genes, from the genus Helogenes, referring to resemblance of that taxon to this one. The specific name, beagle, is the nickname of the Laboratory of Molecular Systematics, Department of Animal Biology, Universidade Federal de Viçosa where the type series was discovered in a freezer. The laboratory's nickname refers to H.M.S. Beagle, the vessel on which Charles Darwin voyaged around the world between 1831 and 1836.

== Description ==
Trichogenes beagle is told apart from the other species in the genus Trichogenes by having triscuspid teeth in the jaws, the odontodes on the gill cover are distributed along a wide area on its margin, the skin is pale with a few sparsely distributed spots on the back and sides, although there are no large spots at the anal fin base and there are no dark coloured marks alon the base of the dorsal fin.

== Distribution ==
Trichogenes beagle is thought to be endemic to southeastern Brazil but its exact range remains unknown.
