= Conceição do Castelo =

- Municipality
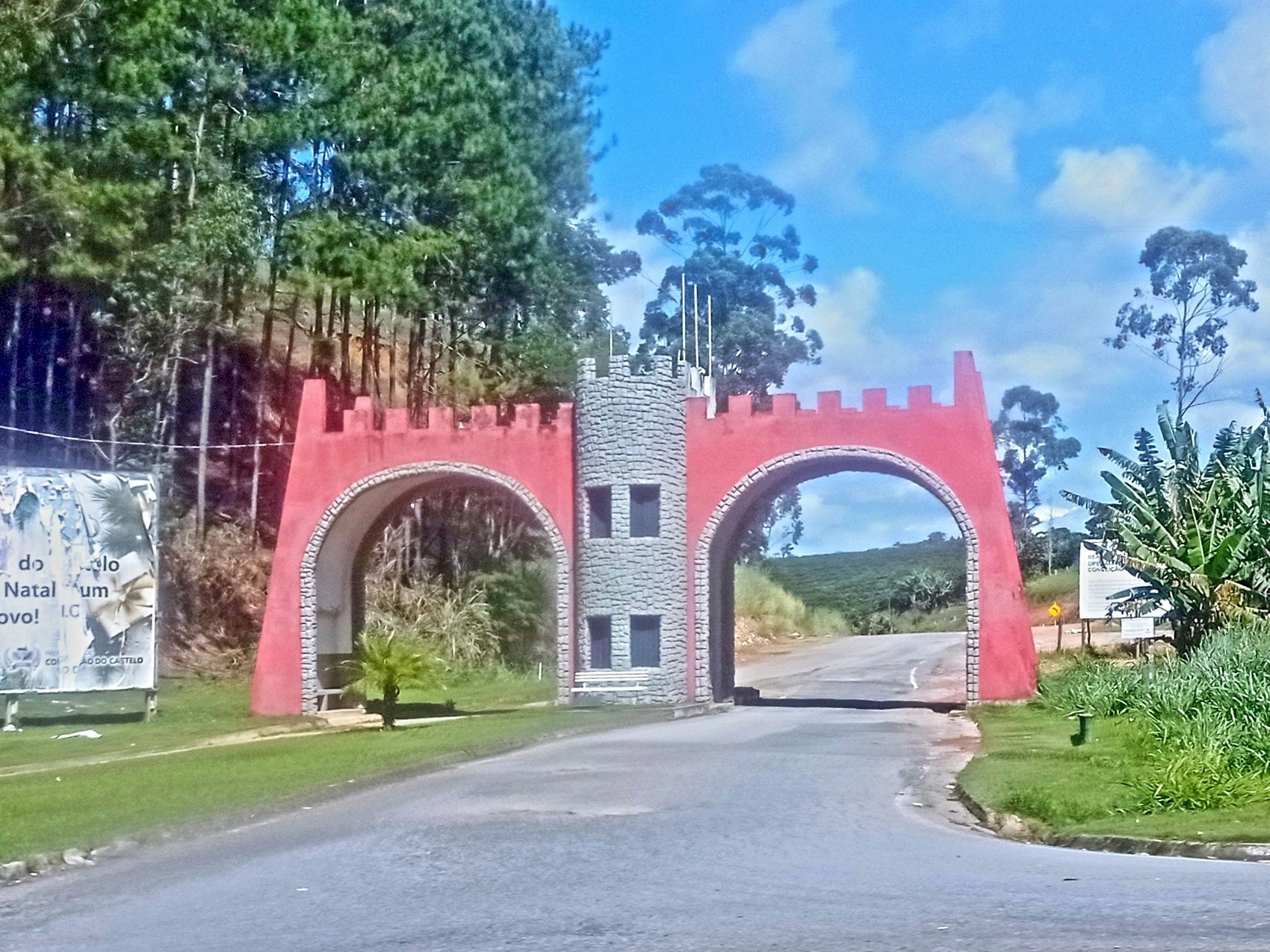

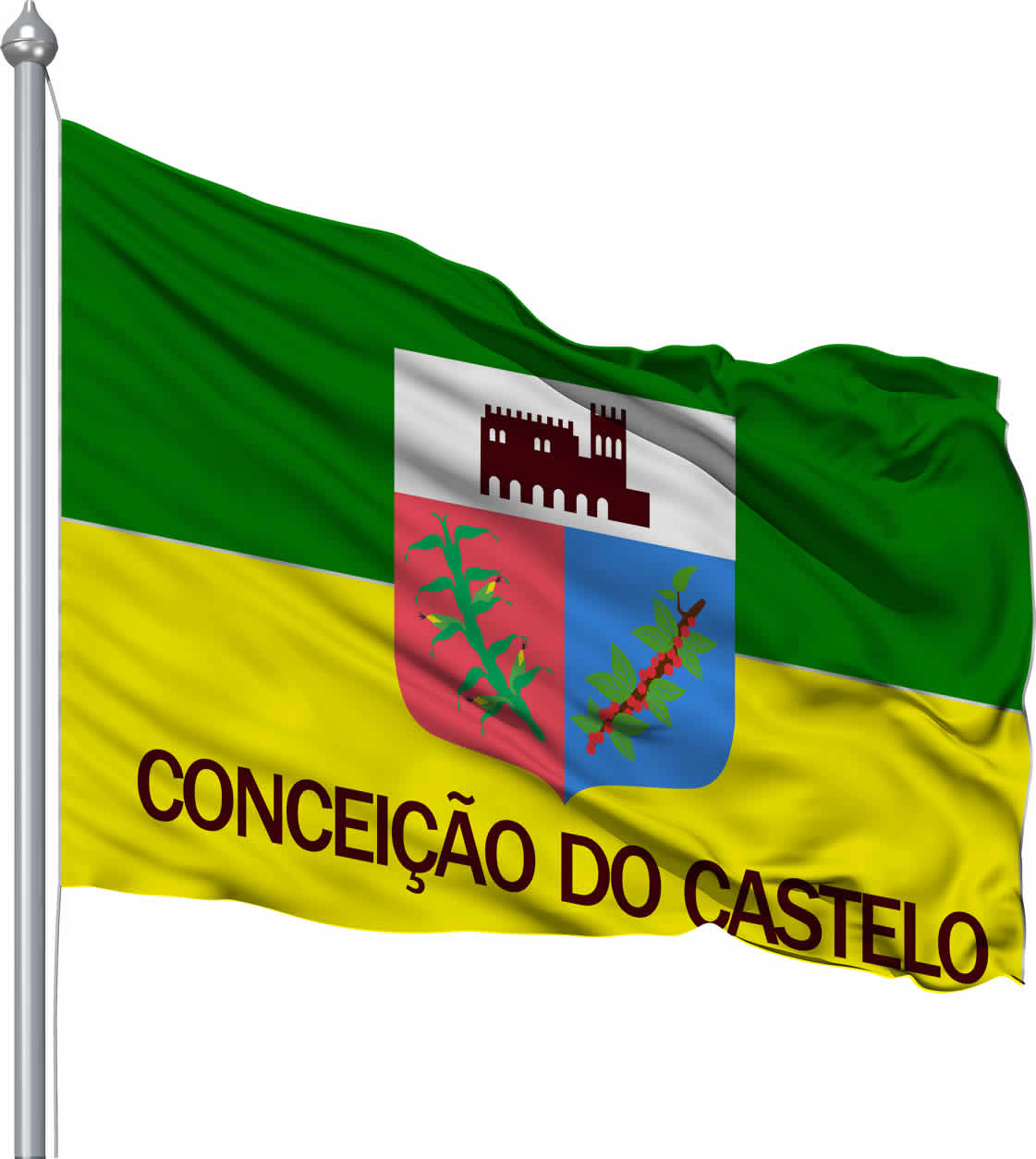
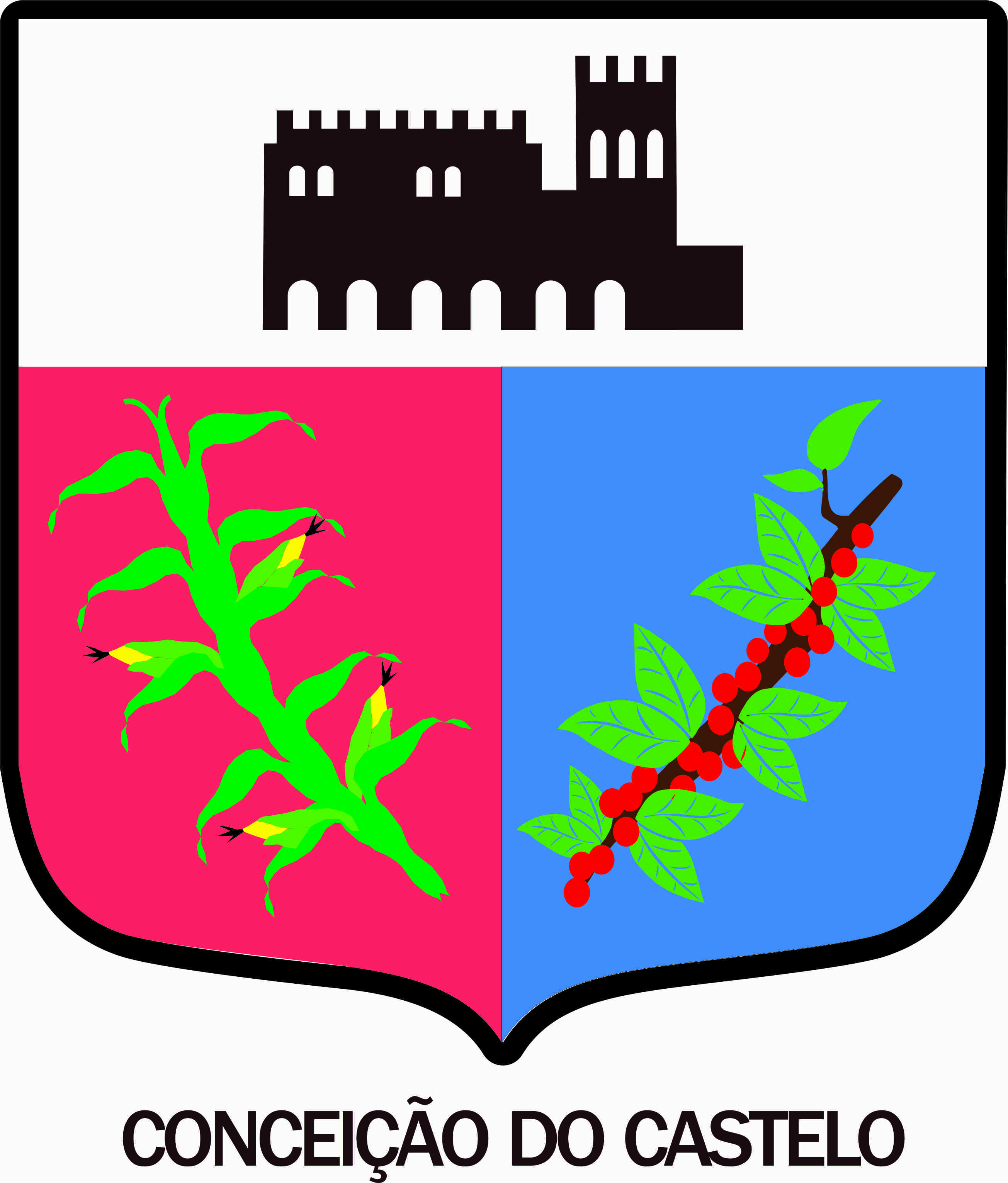
- Flag Coat of arms

- Location in Espírito Santo state

- Location in Brazil
- Coordinates: 20°22′4″S 41°14′38″W
- Country: Brazil
- Region: Southeast
- State: Espírito Santo

Area
  - Total: 369 km^{2} (142 sq mi)

Population (2020)
  - Total: 12,806
  - Density: 34.7/km^{2} (89.9/sq mi)
- Time zone: UTC−3 (BRT)

Conceição do Castelo is a municipality in central Espírito Santo, Brazil. Its population was 12,806 (2020) and its area is 369 km^{2}.

== History ==
The municipality was created when it separated from Castelo on 7 May 1964.

== Geography ==
Conceição do Castelo is about 120 km from the state capital Vitória. It stands in the mountainous region of the state, roughly southwest of the capital.

=== Roads ===
Main access to the commune is the interstate BR-262 (Vitoria - Belo Horizonte) that crosses it's territory.

== Economy ==
The economy is largely based on agriculture. Some important products are coffee, beans, maize, tomatoes and pigs, as well as cattle.
