= Trichogenes longipinnis =

Conservation status
- Near Threatened (IUCN 3.1)

Scientific classification
- Kingdom: Animalia
- Phylum: Chordata
- Class: Actinopterygii
- Order: Siluriformes
- Family: Trichomycteridae
- Subfamily: Trichogeninae
- Genus: Trichogenes
- Species: T. longipinnis

Binomial name
- Trichogenes longipinnis Britski & Ortega, 1983

Species of fish

Trichogenes longipinnis, the long-finned cambeva, species of freshwater ray-finned fish belonging to the family Trichomycteridae, the pencil and parasitic catfishes. T. longipinnis is endemic to coastal streams in the Atlantic forest between Rio de Janeiro and São Paulo States in southeastern Brazil.

== Description ==
The spotted colour pattern differs consistently between stream populations, indicating genetic differentiation. This fish grows to about 14 cm (5.5 in) standard length (SL) in males and 10.6 cm (4.2 in) SL in females.

== Ecology ==
This catfish dwells in pools beneath small waterfalls in steep hill streams flowing over rocky and sandy substrates. The density of these fish varies from three to 25 individuals/m^{2}. At densities of 18 to 25 individuals/m^{2}, these fish aggregate in loose groups of up to 30 individuals. However, the largest ones tend to be solitary and territorial.

Unlike most trichomycterids which are bottom-dwelling and nocturnal, T. longipinnis is nektonic and active both during daytime and at night, with juvenile and small adults being more active at daytime than large adults.

This catfish uses visual, tactile, and chemosensory orientation to feed on bottom-dwelling aquatic and terrestrial insects in the water column or on the surface. Their diet includes immature aquatic insects, crustaceans, adult terrestrial winged insects, whole or fragmented, and carrion. These fish forage mostly by scanning the bottom, the barbels touching the substrate, but visually oriented drift feeding is also used by smaller fish. While foraging, it may bury into sand or plant debris and sift through with its gill openings and mouth.

This species reproduces at the onset of rainy season.

T. longipinnis is restricted to steep hill stream stretches, and is absent in streams on gently sloping terrain dominated by Astyanax characids. The catfish possibly developed, or retained, its characid-like role (diurnal, nektonic, and insectivorous) in separately with this more widespread tetra.

== Conservation ==
Due to restricted distribution, specialized habitat, and differentiated populations, the Vulnerable (VU B1+2bc) status in the IUCN Red List is proposed. However, this species was actually assessed as Near Threatened on 7 November 2018.
