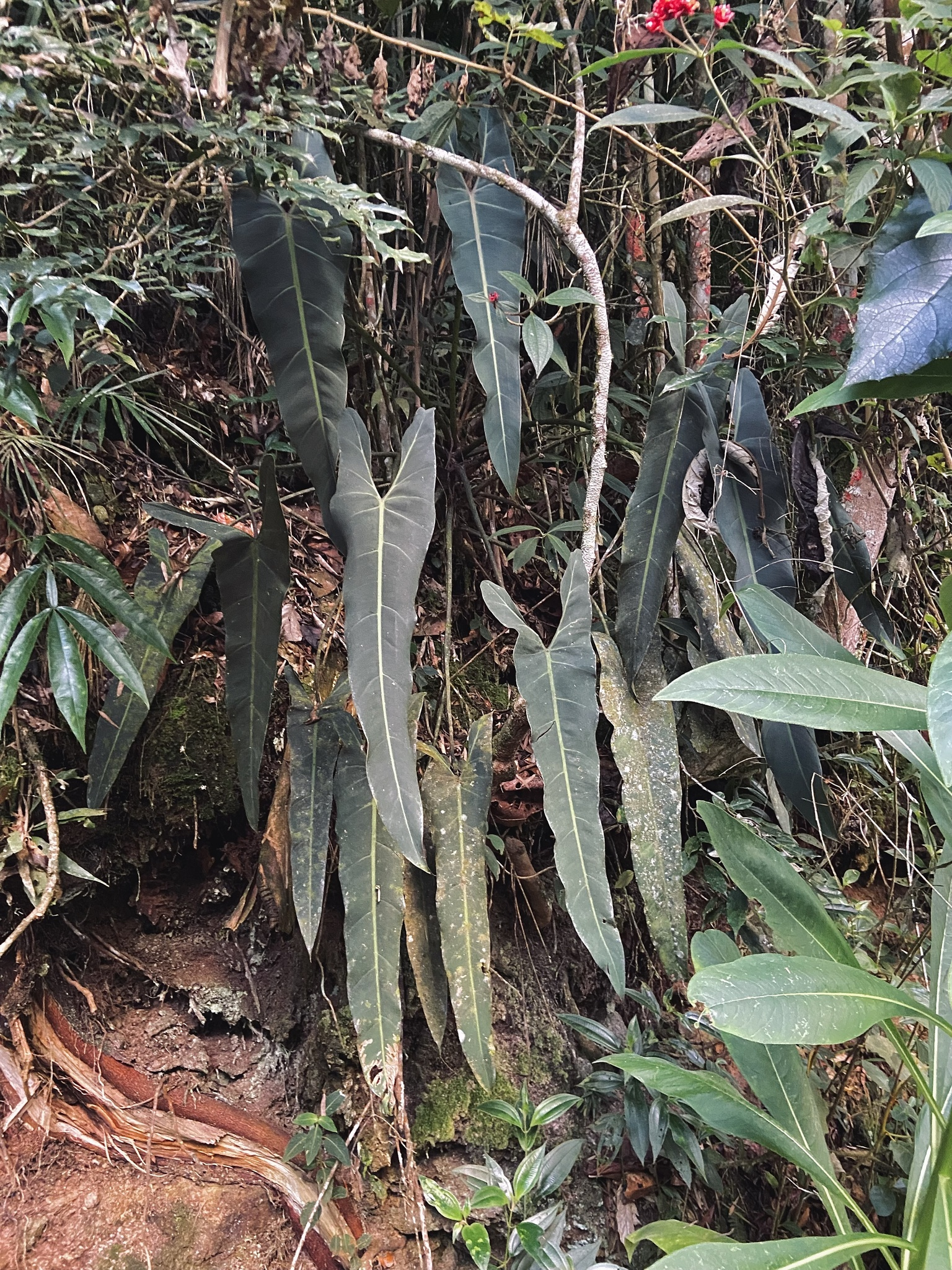

Scientific classification
- Kingdom: Plantae
- Clade: Embryophytes
- Clade: Tracheophytes
- Clade: Spermatophytes
- Clade: Angiosperms
- Clade: Monocots
- Order: Alismatales
- Family: Araceae
- Genus: Philodendron
- Species: P. spiritus-sancti

Binomial name
- Philodendron spiritus-sancti G.S.Bunting

= Philodendron spiritus-sancti =

Species of plant

Philodendron spiritus-sancti is a species of plant in the genus Philodendron native to the Brazilian state of Espírito Santo, which is the origin of its scientific name. A member of the section Macrobelium, it has cordate foliage that can grow up to 57–63 centimetres (22–25 in) long. The width of the leaf blades is variable, and appears in three different forms known in cultivation.

Extremely rare, it was first scientifically described in 1987 from just one locality on private farmland near the town of Domingos Martins, and is severely threatened by habitat destruction. It is thought that more plants are held by private collectors than in the wild.

In 2024, a population of P. spiritus-sancti was discovered 128 kilometres (80 mi) from the previously known range, consisting of 50 well-developed individuals and many seedlings. The most impressive groups of individual plants are rupicolous, growing on a rocky wall. They dominate the wall and grow directly on the rocks, with associated rupicolous species such as Philodendron edmundoi, Griffinia concinna, Begonia species, and bromeliads. The population has plants with both narrow and broad leaves growing together in a morphological gradient, resembling the species in the central mountainous region. Philodendron spiritus-sancti was previously considered a hemiepiphyte of the high forest canopy.

== See also ==
- List of Philodendron species
