= Vargem Alta =

Coordinates: 20°40′15″S 41°00′25″W

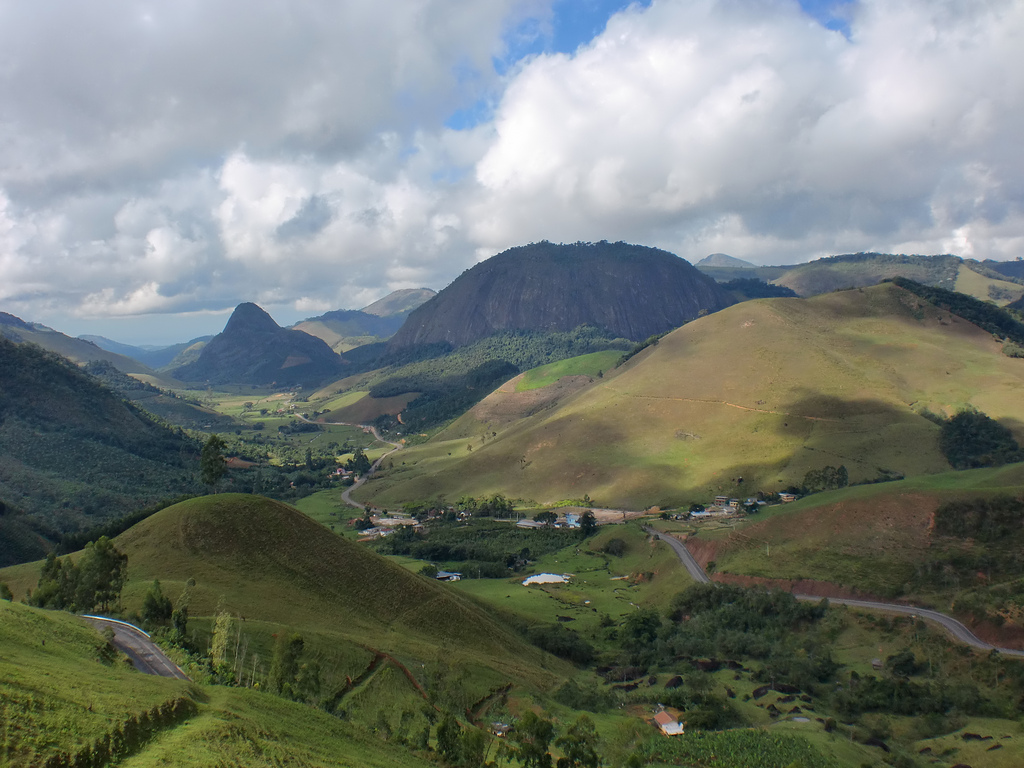

- Flag Coat of arms

- Founded: 20 March 1988

Area
  - Total: 414.737 km^{2} (160.131 sq mi)

Population (2020)
  - Total: 21,591
  - Density: 52.059/km^{2} (134.83/sq mi)

Vargem Alta is a municipality located in the Brazilian state of Espírito Santo. Its population was 21,591 (2020) and its area is 415 km^{2} (160 sq mi).

The municipality contains part of the protected area of the Frade e a Freira Natural Monument.

== See also ==
- List of municipalities in Espírito Santo
