= Inácio Henrique Gouveia =

Brazilian military leader

President (governor) of Espirito Santo (interventor)
- In office 8 December 1891 – 3 May 1892
- Preceded by: Alfeu Adolfo Monjardim de Andrade e Almeida
- Succeeded by: José de Melo Carvalho Muniz Freire

Personal details
- Born: Inácio Henrique da Costa Gouveia; 3 May 1839 Paraíba, Kingdom of Brazil
- Died: 5 June 1908 (aged 69) Paraíba, Empire of Brazil

Inácio Henrique da Costa Gouveia (3 May 1839 – 5 June 1908) was a Brazilian military leader.

He participated in a governing junta (also including Graciano dos Santos Neves and Galdino Teixeira de Barros Loreto, in control of the state of Espírito Santo from 8 December 1891, to 3 May 1892. In 1897, he took part in the assault on the rebellious community of Canudos, which was completely destroyed by the Brazilian army.
