= José Marcelino Pessoa de Vasconcellos =

Brazilian politician

President (governor) of Espírito Santo (elected by the people)
- In office January 6, 1898 – May 23, 1900
- Preceded by: Constante Gomes Sodré
- Succeeded by: José de Melo Carvalho Muniz Freire

José Marcelino Pessoa de Vasconcellos was a Brazilian politician. He became the 11th president (governor) of the state of Espírito Santo in 1898 when he was elected to finish the 1896–1900 term, due to the resignation of the titular, Graciano dos Santos Neves, in 1897.

Although Graciano dos Santos Neves was replaced by his vice-governor, Constante Gomes Sodré, the Brazilian Constitution of 1890 demanded a new election in case a chief of govern resigned, was impeached or died before the middle of the term, so Pessoa de Vasconcellos was elected to finish that term.
