= Jerônimo de Sousa Monteiro =

Brazilian politician (1870–1933)

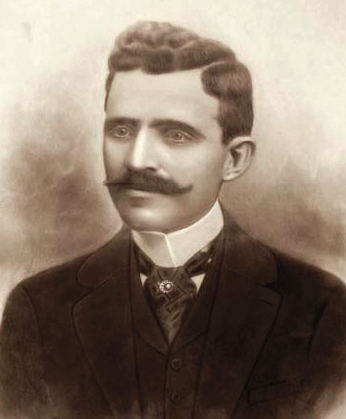

President of Espírito Santo
- In office 23 May 1908 – 23 May 1912
- Preceded by: Henrique da Silva Coutinho
- Succeeded by: Marcondes Alves de Sousa

Member of the Chamber of Deputies
- In office 1897–1899
- In office 1915–1918

Senator for Espírito Santo
- In office 1918–1927

Personal details
- Born: 4 June 1870 Cachoeiro de Itapemirim, Empire of Brazil
- Died: 23 October 1933 (aged 63)

Jerônimo de Sousa Monteiro (4 June 1870 – 23 October 1933) was a Brazilian politician. He was a representative (in the local Espírito do Santo's Chamber of Representative and in the Brazilian Federal Chamber of Representatives), a Senator, and the 13th president (governor) of the state of Espírito Santo, a position he held from 23 May 1908 to 23 May 1912.

== Life ==
Monteiro was born in Cachoeiro do Itapemirim, Espírito Santo. He is considered the author of the flag of the state of Espírito Santo, which is formed of three horizontal bands—a cyan band on the top, a white band in the middle and a pink band on the bottom—and has the motto "Trabalha e Confia" (lit. 'Work and Trust') written on the white band. "Work and trust" is a shortened version of a quote from the Spanish Jesuit father José de Anchieta, "Work as if everything depended on you, and trust as if everything depended on God".

Monteiro helped on improve the capital city, Vitória, adding better services of potable water, sewage and electric power; he also reformed the port of Vitória and the public hospital of the Holly House of the Mercy. He attempted to install an industrial zone in the regions of the state south to Cachoeiro do Itapemirim, but the industrialists choise Vitória.

Monteiro was the leader of a strong political group in South Espírito Santo, mostly landowners opposed to the more heterogeneous socially political group from the central region of Espírito Santo. By the time his brother Bernardino de Sousa Monteiro was in his late term, Monteiro tried to impede Nestor Gomez, legally elected governor of Espírito Santo in 1924, to be inaugurated officially.
