= Florentino Ávidos =

Brazilian politician (1870–1956)

President of Espírito Santo
- In office May 23, 1920 – May 23, 1924
- Preceded by: Nestor Gomez
- Succeeded by: Aristeu Borges de Aguiar

Florentino Ávidos (November 18, 1870 – February 28, 1956) was a Brazilian politician. He was the 17th president (governor) of the Brazilian state of Espírito Santo, and, later, a senator of that state on Brazilian Senate.

== Career ==
He was an engineer by trade and was elected for governor of Espírito Santo in 1924. He governed the state from May 23, 1924 to June 30, 1928. he built roads and bridges in order to improve the communications in the state, being the most important the "Five Bridges Complex" connecting the Isle of Vitória to the continent and to the Isle of the Prince as well. These bridges were named "Florentino Ávidos", in his homage, after his death in 1956.
