= Max Freitas Mauro =

Brazilian politician (1937–2024)

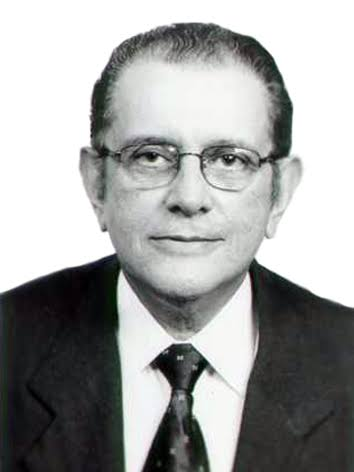
- Mauro in 1986

Governor of Espírito Santo
- In office 16 March 1987 – 15 March 1991
- Preceded by: José Moraes
- Succeeded by: Albuíno Cunha de Azeredo

Member of the Chamber of Deputies of Brazil for Espírito Santo
- In office 1 February 1999 – 1 February 2003
- In office 15 March 1979 – 15 March 1987

Personal details
- Born: 11 March 1937 Vila Velha, Espírito Santo, Brazil
- Died: 14 November 2024 (aged 87) Vitória, Espírito Santo, Brazil
- Party: PMDB (1980–1989); PDT (1989–1994); PMN (1994–1996); PTB (1996–2003)
- Education: Federal University of Bahia
- Occupation: Doctor

Max Freitas Mauro (11 March 1937 – 14 November 2024) was a Brazilian doctor and politician. A member of multiple political parties, he served in the Chamber of Deputies from 1979 to 1987 and again from 1999 to 2003 and was Governor of Espírito Santo from 1987 to 1991.

Mauro died in Vitória on 14 November 2024, at the age of 87.
