= Argeu Hortêncio Monjardim =

Brazilian politician

Argeu Hortênsio Monjardim

President (governor) of Espírito Santo (appointed)
- In office May 23, 1904 – June 16, 1904
- Preceded by: José de Melo Carvalho Muniz Freire
- Succeeded by: Henrique da Silva Coutinho

Argeu Hortênsio Monjardim was a Brazilian politician. He was elected vice-president (vice-governor) of the state of Espírito Santo in 1904, and he governed the state for three weeks until the new-elected governor, Henrique da Silva Coutinho, could be inaugurated.
