= Aristeu Borges de Aguiar =

President (governor) of Espirito Santo (elected by the people)
- In office June 30, 1928 – October 16, 1930
- Preceded by: Florentino Ávidos
- Succeeded by: José Armando Ribeiro de Paula

Aristeu Borges de Aguiar (Vitória ES, May 23, 1892 - Rio de Janeiro RJ September 1, 1951) was a Brazilian lawyer, teacher and politician.

== Early career ==
He graduated in Laws in Rio de Janeiro in 1915 and worked in Vitória as a public law attorney. In 1919, he began working as a teacher of World's History and Brazilian History at the school Gymnasium of Espirito Santo.

== Political career ==
In 1924, by invitation of the governor Florentino Ávidos, he occupied the functions of state's secretary for Education, for a brief time. In 1928, he was elected the 18th president (governor) of the state of Espírito Santo. It was in the time of his term as governor that the Wall Street's crisis took place, which especially affected Espirito Santo's economy, mostly dependent on the monoculture of the coffee back in that days.

Aristeu de Aguiar supported Júlio Prestes as candidate for the presidency of Brazil in the elections of March 1930. In spite those elections were actually won by Júlio Prestes, the loser candidate, Getúlio Vargas, alleging electoral fraud, launched a national rebellion in order to take the office as President of Brazil by force. Since Aristeu de Aguiar was a supporter of Júlio Prestes, he abandoned the govern of Espirito Santo due to the invasion of the state by the troops of the colonel Otávio Campos do Amaral, supporter of Vargas' rebellion. Aguiar escaped to Portugal on board of the Italian cargo ship Atlanta. As his legal successor, the vice-governor Joaquim Teixeira de Mesquita, ran away as well, the President of Brazil, Washington Luís, appointed the legalist colonel José Armando Ribeiro de Paula as a provisional governor for the state.
