= Marcondes Alves de Sousa =

Brazilian politician

President (governor) of Espírito Santo (elected by the people)
- In office May 23, 1912 – May 23, 1916
- Preceded by: Jerônimo de Sousa Monteiro
- Succeeded by: Bernardino de Sousa Monteiro

Personal details
- Born: 12 September 1868 Itaúna, Empire of Brazil
- Died: 29 April 1938 (aged 69) Belo Horizonte, Brazil

Marcondes Alves de Sousa (12 September 1868 – 29 April 1938) was a Brazilian politician. He was the 14th president (governor) of the state of Espírito Santo.
