= Nestor Gomes =

Brazilian politician (1875–1941)

President of Espírito Santo
- In office 23 May 1920 – 23 May 1924
- Preceded by: Bernardino de Sousa Monteiro
- Succeeded by: Florentino Ávidos

Personal details
- Born: 8 September 1875 Conceição de Macabu, Empire of Brazil
- Died: 9 March 1941 (aged 65) Belo Horizonte, Minas Gerais, Brazil

Nestor Gomes (8 September 1875 – 9 March 1941) was a Brazilian politician. He was state representative in Espírito Santo's Chamber of Representatives, president (governor) of Espírito Santo, and Senator of Espírito Santo in the Brazilian Senate.

Gomes was born in Conceição de Macabu, Rio de Janeiro. Although he was elected by the people for governor of Espírito Santo in early 1920, Jerônimo Monteiro, who was the governor Bernardino de Sousa Monteiro's brother and leader of the political party in charge in Espírito Santo, tried to impede Nestor Gomes from being inaugurated officially. Nestor Gomes had to march ahead of a group of more than 100 private gunmen across Vitoria, the capital city of Espírito Santo, to expel his predecessor and take the office by force.
