= José de Melo Carvalho Muniz Freire =

Brazilian politician

Muniz Freire
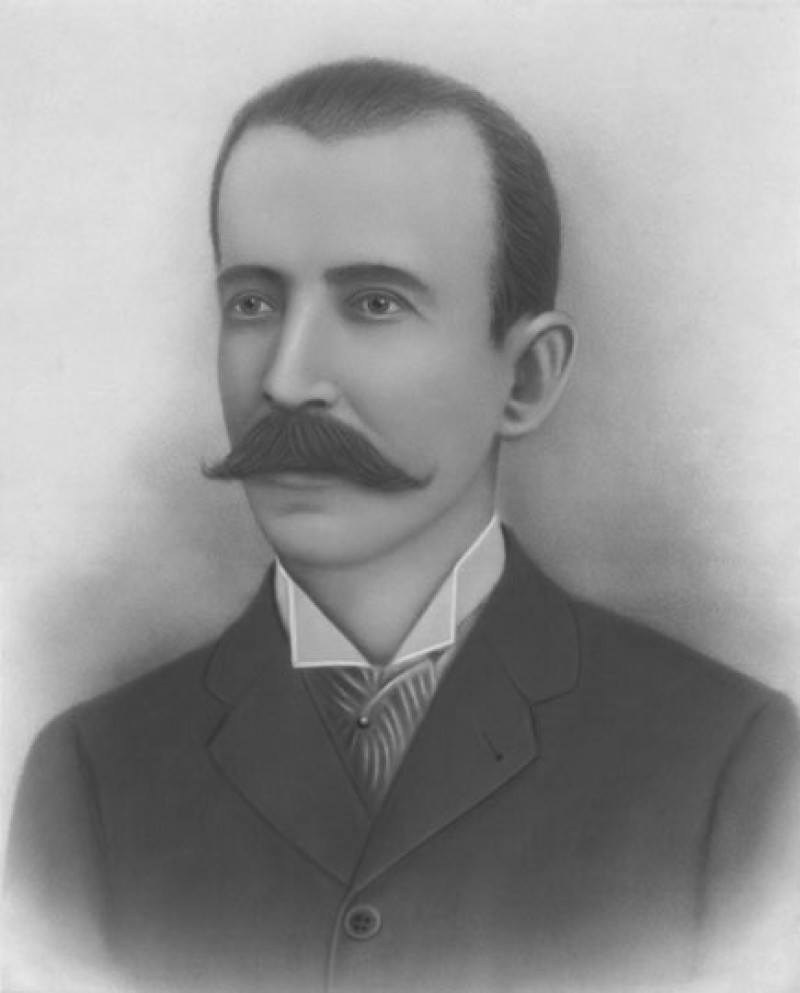

President of Espírito Santo
- In office 3 May 1892 – 23 May 1896
- Preceded by: Governing junta formed by Inácio Henrique de Gouveia, Graciano dos Santos Neves and Galdino Teixeira de Barros Loreto.
- Succeeded by: Graciano dos Santos Neves
- In office 23 May 1900 – 23 May 1904
- Preceded by: José Marcelino Pessoa de Vasconcellos
- Succeeded by: Argeu Hortênsio Monjardim

José Melo de Carvalho Muniz Freire (13 July 1861 – 3 April 1918) was a Brazilian politician. He was the 10th president (governor) of the state of Espirito Santo, from 1892 to 1896, and again from 1900 to 1904.

Freire was born in Vitória. He developed the railroads of the state, building the line from Vila Velha to Viana (which was later expanded to Cachoeiro de Itapemirin, from where it joined to the railroad to Rio de Janeiro), and greatly promoted European immigration to the State. Espírito Santo got 15,586 immigrants from Germany, Italy and the Balkans in the time of his term as governor. He was also a Senator for Espírito Santo in the Brazilian Senate (from 1904 to 1905 and from 1905 to 1914), and was the first Brazilian politician to defend the adoption of the secret vote (in Brazil, by that time, the vote was open; voter had to declare his vote for the electoral agent to take note of it). The secret vote was only to be adopted in Brazil after 1930. The creation of the Electoral Court System and the first Election Code of Brazil goes back to 1932.
