= José Armando Ribeiro de Paula =

Brazilian military officer

President (governor) of Espírito Santo (appointed)
- In office October 16, 1930 – November 19, 1930
- Preceded by: Aristeu Borges de Aguiar
- Succeeded by: João Manuel de Carvalho Afonso Correia Lírio and João Punaro Bley (governing junta)

José Armando Ribeiro de Paula was a Brazilian colonel of the Brazilian Army.

== Biography ==
When the rebellious forces which supported Getúlio Vargas in his attempt to take the government of Brazil by force in 1930 invaded the legalist state of Espírito Santo, the President of Brazil, Washington Luís appointed José Armando Ribeiro de Paula as the commander of the 3rd Command of the Hunters of the Brazilian Army at Espírito Santo, whose task was to give support to the legal governor, Aristeu Borges de Aguiar. However, Aguiar abandoned the office and escaped on an Italian cargo ship, and his legal successor, the vice-governor Joaquim Teixeira de Mesquita, disappeared as well, so President Washington Luís appointed José Armando Ribeiro de Paula as governor of Espírito Santo.

Jose Armando Ribeiro de Paula took charge of the office on October 16, 1930, but was soon defeated by the rebel forces under the command of the renegade Colonel Otávio Campos do Amaral, who invaded the capital city, Vitória few days later. Ribeiro de Paula was deposed and replaced by a governing junta (composed of João Manuel de Carvalho, Afonso Correia Lírio and João Punaro Bley).
