= Albuíno Cunha de Azeredo =

Brazilian civil engineer and politician

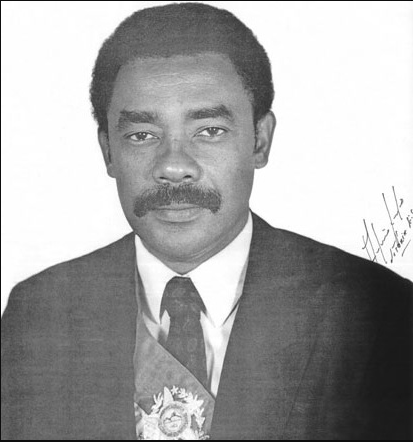

Governor of Espírito Santo
- In office March 15, 1991 – January 1, 1995
- Preceded by: Max Freitas Mauro
- Succeeded by: Vitor Buaiz

Personal details
- Born: January 21, 1945 Vila Velha, Espírito Santo, Brazil
- Died: October 16, 2018 (aged 73) Vila Velha, Espírito Santo, Brazil
- Party: Democratic Labour Party (PDT)

Albuíno Cunha de Azeredo (January 21, 1945 – September 16, 2018) was a Brazilian civil engineer and politician. He served as the Governor of Espírito Santo from 1991 until 1995 as a member of the Democratic Labour Party (PDT).

== Early life and career ==
Albuíno Cunha de Azeredo was born on January 21, 1945, in Vila Velha to parents, Albuíno Ferreira de Azeredo and Normília Cunha de Azeredo. Before studying engineering, he worked as a street vendor and grocer during his early life. He also played club soccer for Atlético de Vitória. Azeredo received his engineering degree from the Federal University of Espírito Santo. He then moved to Rio de Janeiro, where he studied business administration and computer science at the Pontifical Catholic University of Rio de Janeiro from 1968 to 1969.

He was hired by the Vale S.A. company (Companhia Vale do Rio Doce) at the invitation of company president Eliezer Batista. While at Vale S.A., Cunha held the positions of permanent engineer, head of civil engineering, signaling coordinator of the Vitória a Minas railroad, and head of the company's Intervale S.A. subsidiary.

Azeredo founded his own engineering firm, called Engenharia e Estudos Ferroviários, in 1977. The company eventually expanded to five Brazilian states, as well as an office in London.

== Political career ==
Azeredo was originally joined the Brazilian Democratic Movement (MDB), which opposed the military dictatorship, in 1970. However, once other parties were granted limited recognition in 1979, Cunha switched to the new Brazilian Democratic Movement Party (PMDB).

He worked as the secretary of planning for the municipality of Cariacica during the 1980s, until Espírito Santo Governor Max Freitas Mauro appointed him to his cabinet as state Secretary of Planning and Transport in 1988. During his tenure as Secretary of Planning, Azeredo established the Sistema Transcol in 1989, which reorganized the public transportation system in the Vitória metropolitan area.

In early 1990, Azeredo joined the Democratic Labour Party (PDT) at the invitation of Waldir Pires, a then federal deputy who had recently served as Governor of Bahia. Azeredo soon announced his candidacy for Governor of Espírito Santo in the 1990 state gubernatorial election. Azeredo defeated his opponent, José Inácio Ferreira of the now defunct Social Labour Party (PST) by 44% to 36% in the gubernatorial first round, and 51% to 25% in the second round. During his tenure as governor, Azeredo oversaw the visits of Pope John Paul II and South African President Nelson Mandela to Espírito Santo.

In October 1998, Azeredo once again ran for Governor of Espírito Santo as the head of a state coalition formed by the Democratic Labour Party (PDT), the Popular Socialist Party (PPS), and several smaller parties. However, Azeredo was defeated by his former 1990 opponent, José Inácio Ferreira of the Brazilian Social Democracy Party (PSDB) in the first round.

Azeredo was hospitalized at the Hospital Vila Velha on September 12, 2018, while visiting from his home in Rio de Janeiro. He was diagnosed with pneumonia and admitted to the ICU. However, five days later, Azeredo succumbed to complications of pneumonia and cardiac arrest at the hospital at approximately 7:50 am on September 16, 2018, at the age of 73. He was laid in state at the Legislative Assembly of Espírito Santo in Vitória before burial in the Parque da Paz cemetery at Ponta da Frut in his native Vila Velha.
