= João Punaro Bley =

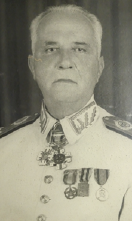

President (governor) of Espirito Santo (member of a governing junta)
- In office November 19, 1930 – November 22, 1930
- Preceded by: José Armando Ribeiro de Paula
- Succeeded by: himself

President (governor) of Espirito Santo (Federal Interventor)
- In office November 22, 1930 – 1935
- Preceded by: himself
- Succeeded by: himself

Governor of Espirito Santo (elected by the State's Chamber of Representatives)
- In office 1935–1937
- Preceded by: himself
- Succeeded by: himself

Governor of Espirito Santo (Federal Interventor)
- In office 1937 – January 21, 1943
- Preceded by: himself
- Succeeded by: Jones dos Santos Neves

Personal details
- Born: 14 November 1900
- Died: 20 April 1983 (aged 82)

João Punaro Bley (born 14 November 1900 in Montes Claros MG – 20 April 1983) was a Brazilian military and public administrator.

He graduated from the Minas Gerais Military School as a Brazilian Army lieutenant in 1921. Although he was sympathetic to the rebellion of young officers called Movimento Tenentista ('Lieutenants' Movement') of 1922, he did not take part. In 1930 he joined the national rebellion against the Constitutional Brazilian government that began when the candidate who lost the 1930 election for president, Getúlio Vargas, alleged fraud and decided to take power by force. João Punaro Bley joined the lines of the rebel Colonel Otávio Campos do Amaral and took part on the capture of Vitória (capital city of the state of Espírito Santo). As Octávio Campos do Amaral marched towards Rio de Janeiro, João Punaro Bley occupied the office of that state as part of a governing junta also formed by João Manuel de Carvalho and Afonso Correia Lírio.

This governing Junta lasted for a few days, whereupon on November 22, 1930, João Punaro Bley was appointed Federal Interventor in Espirito Santo for an undetermined time by the newly installed de facto president of Brazil, Getúlio Vargas.

In 1934, following the re-constitutionalization of Brazil, João Punaro Bley was elected legal governor for the 1935–1939 term (he was also the first chief of the executive power of Espirito Santo to take the title of governor instead of president). However, he was given Federal powers once again in 1937 and remained in office until 1943.

When Bley took office, the state of Espirito Santo was in a poor economic situation, as the Wall Street crash in 1929 directly affected the monoculture of coffee, the main export. In order to lower coffee prices in the consumer markets, and to force the farmers to diversify the state's agriculture, Bley sent troops to invade the farms and to uproot and burn as much coffee plants as possible. Against all odds, the bad economic situation of the state was quickly overcome and all the debts of the state were paid.

João Punaro Bley wanted to eliminate the political influence of the big landowner farmers (like the family Monteiro) over the state. First, he encouraged the internal peasant migration towards the underpopulated regions in the north of the state, which depleted the coffee plantations of workers; then Bley boosted the industrialization of the state and the development of urban business activities. Both decisions demanded a large investment to improve the state's infrastructure (power, drinking water, sewage, roads and railroads to link the south and the north of the state, as well to connect the state to the rest of the country). Also, against the vindictive landowner's mobs of gunmen ("jagunços" as they were known), Bley invested in creating a regular professional state police and built the state's headquarters of Maruipe and new, and more secure, state jails.

Bley created the first university of Espirito Santo, which initially offered courses in Odontology, Law and Pharmacy.

It was also on Bley's time in office that the mining company Vale do Rio Doce (still owned by the Brazilian government) started construction of a railway linking the iron mining fields in Minas Gerais to the port of Vitória, from where the iron was distributed to other states or exported overseas.

João Punaro Bley resigned from office on 21 January 1943. His powers were transferred to his substitute, Jones dos Santos Neves. João Punaro Bley worked as commerce director at the Vale do Rio Doce until 1947, then he resumed his military career, from which he retired in 1962.
