= Alfeu =

Alfeu is a given name. Notable people with the name include:

- Alfeu Adolfo Monjardim de Andrade e Almeida (1836–1924), Brazilian governor
- Alfeu (footballer) (born 1936), Brazilian footballer
