= Graciano dos Santos Neves =

Brazilian physician and politician

President (governor) of Espírito Santo (interventor)
- In office December 8, 1891 – May 3, 1892
- Preceded by: Alfeu Adolfo Monjardim de Andrade e Almeida
- Succeeded by: José de Melo Carvalho Muniz Freire

President (governor) of Espírito Santo (elected by the people)
- In office May 23, 1896 – September 23, 1897
- Preceded by: José de Melo Carvalho Muniz Freire
- Succeeded by: Constante Gomes Sodré

Graciano dos Santos Neves (June 12, 1868 – 1922) was a Brazilian physician and politician.

Santos Neves was born in São Mateus, Espírito Santo. He graduated as physician in Rio de Janeiro in 1889 and was one of the most affluent Brazilian physicians of his time.

In December 1891, the government of the state of Espírito Santo suffered an intervention by the Partido Republicano Construtor (Builder's Republican Party), due to the resignation of the legal governor Alfeu Adolfo Monjardim de Andrade e Almeida, who abandoned the office in protest against the coup d'état of November 23, 1891 that led the Marshall Manuel Deodoro da Fonseca to resign the presidency of Brazil in favour of his vice-president Marshall Floriano Peixoto, who had aspirations to become a de facto ruler. Inácio Henrique de Gouveia, Graciano dos Santos Neves and Galdino Teixeira de Barros Loreto were appointed by the Builder's Republican Party to take the charge as provisional administrators of the state until the election, by the people, of a new president (governor). This one was José de Melo Carvalho Muniz Freire, elected governor in early 1892.

Four years later, on May 23, 1896, Graciano dos Santos Neves returned to the office of governor of Espírito Santo, this time as an elected governor. However, he resigned the office on September 23, 1897, due to his disappointment with politics.

He wrote a book called A Doutrina do Engrossamento (The Doctrine on Getting Tougher) which was an essay on the flattering among politicians with self-promotion purposes, and on how much it is emotionally disappointing, based on his experience as interventor and governor of Espírito Santo.

Later in his life, Graciano dos Santos Neves became the director of the Botanic Garden of Rio de Janeiro.
