= List of governors of Espírito Santo =

Governor of the State of Espírito Santo
- Governador do Estado do Espírito Santo

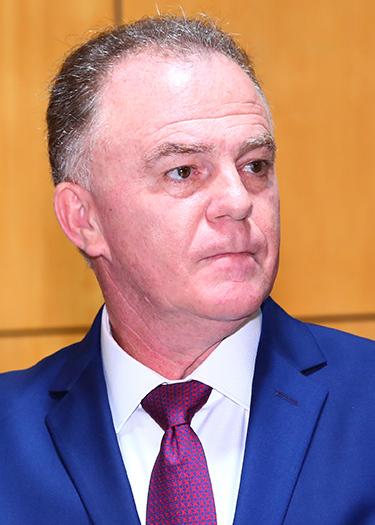
- Incumbent; Renato Casagrande since 1 January 2019
- Style: Mr. Governor or even simply Governor (informal); Most Excellent Mr. Governor (formal); His Excellency (alternative formal, diplomatic)
- Status: Head of state; Head of government
- Residence: Casa do Governador (official)
- Term length: Four years, renewable once
- Constituting instrument: 1989 State Constitution
- Precursor: President of the Province of Espírito Santo (until 1891); President of the State of Espírito Santo (until 1946)
- Inaugural holder: Afonso Cláudio
- Formation: 15 June 1891; 135 years ago
- Deputy: Vice Governor
- Salary: Net R$ 30,971.84 (US$ 5998)
- Website: www.es.gov.br

The governor of Espírito Santo is the chief executive of the Brazilian state of Espírito Santo. Below is a list of governors of the Brazilian state of Espírito Santo, since the creation of this administrative function, along with the proclamation of the Republic in Brazil, until the present day.

The governors of the Brazilian states were called presidents from 1889 to 1934. Then it was decided they should take the title of governors instead, which is the title they use today.

Prior to the proclamation of the Brazilian Republic in 1889, Brazil had no states at all; the country was subdivided into provinces, which administrators were appointed by the emperor in agreement with the provinces' chambers of representatives.

This list was taken and copied directly from the Governors of Espírito Santo's page on Portuguese Wikipedia, and some complementary information added here was taken from the Portuguese version of Britannica Encyclopedia edited in São Paulo, Brazil, 2000. All credit must go to those users from pt.wikipedia.org who created and edited this list, and to Britannica Encyclopedia

== Governors in the republican period (1889–present) ==
Presidents of the State of Espírito Santo from November 22, 1889 to July 16, 1934
| Order | Name | Term begins | Term ends | Comments and observations |
|---|---|---|---|---|
| 1st | Afonso Cláudio de Freitas Rosa | November 22, 1889 | January 7, 1890 | Appointed |
| 2nd | José Horácio Costa | January 7, 1890 | September 9, 1890 | Afonso Cláudio de Freitas Rosa's legal substitute (appointed) |
| 3rd | Constante Gomes Sodré | September 9, 1890 | November 20, 1890 | Appointed |
| 4th | Henrique da Silva Coutinho | November 20, 1890 | March 11, 1891 | Appointed |
| 5th | Antonio Gomez Aguirre | March 11, 1891 | June 7, 1891 | Appointed |
| 6th | Alfeu Adolfo Monjardim de Andrade e Almeida | June 7, 1891 | December 8, 1891 | Elected, resigned |
| 7th, 8th and 9th | Inácio Henrique de Gouveia, Graciano dos Santos Neves and Galdino Teixeira de Barros Loreto | December 8, 1891 | May 3, 1892 | Intervention on the govern of the State; governing junta |
| 10th | José de Melo Carvalho Muniz Freire | May 3, 1892 | May 23, 1896 | Elected |
| - | Graciano dos Santos Neves | May 23, 1896 | September 23, 1897 | Elected |
| - | Constante Gomes Sodré | September 23, 1897 | January 6, 1898 | Elected as Graciano dos Santos Neves' Vice-President |
| 11th | José Marcelino Pessoa de Vasconcellos | January 6, 1898 | May 23, 1900 | Elected to finish the 1896-1900 term |
| - | José de Melo Carvalho Muniz Freire | May 23, 1900 | May 23, 1904 | Elected |
| 12th | Argeu Hortênsio Monjardim | May 23, 1904 | June 16, 1904 | Elected as Henrique da Silva Coutinho's Vice-President |
| - | Henrique da Silva Coutinho | June 16, 1904 | May 23, 1908 | Elected |
| 13th | Jerônimo de Sousa Monteiro | May 23, 1908 | May 23, 1912 | Elected |
| 14th | Marcondes Alves de Sousa | May 23, 1912 | May 23, 1916 | Elected |
| 15th | Bernardino de Sousa Monteiro | May 23, 1916 | May 23, 1920 | Elected |
| 16th | Nestor Gomez | May 23, 1920 | May 23, 1924 | Elected |
| 17th | Florentino Ávidos | May 23, 1924 | June 30, 1928 | Elected |
| 18th | Aristeu Borges de Aguiar | June 30, 1928 | October 16, 1930 | Elected |
| 19th | José Armando Ribeiro de Paula | October 16, 1930 | November 19, 1930 | Appointed, in lack of Constitutional successors for Aristeu Borges de Aguiar |
| 20th, 21st and 22nd | João Manuel de Carvalho, Afonso Correia Lírio and João Punaro Bley | November 19, 1930 | November 22, 1930 | Federal Intervention on the State; governing junta |
| - | João Punaro Bley | November 22, 1930 | January 21, 1943 | Federal Interventor; elected as Constitutional Governor for the 1935-1939 term; given powers of Federal Interventor again in November 1937 |

Governors of the State of Espírito Santo since July 16, 1934
| Order | Name | Term begins | Term ends | Comments and observations |
|---|---|---|---|---|
| - | João Punaro Bley | November 22, 1930 | January 21, 1943 | Federal Interventor; elected as Constitutional Governor for the 1935-1939 term; given powers of Federal Interventor again in November 1937 |
| 23rd | Jones dos Santos Neves | January 21, 1943 | October 27, 1945 | Federal Interventor |
| 24th | José Rodrigues Sette | October 27, 1945 | November 6, 1945 | Federal Interventor |
| 25th | Octávio de Carvalho Lemgruber | November 6, 1945 | February 27, 1946 | Federal Interventor |
| 26th | Aristides Alexandre Campos | February 27, 1946 | June 8, 1946 | Federal Interventor |
| 27th | Ubaldo Ramalhete Maia | June 8, 1946 | October 14, 1946 | Federal Interventor |
| 28th | Moacir Ubirajara da Silva | October 14, 1946 | March 29, 1947 | Federal Interventor |
| 29th | Carlos Fernando Monteiro Lindenberg | March 29, 1947 | January 31, 1951 | Elected |
| - | Jones dos Santos Neves | January 31, 1951 | January 31, 1952 | Elected |
| 30th | Francisco Alves Ataíde | January 31, 1952 | January 31, 1955 | Elected as Jones dos Santos Neves' Vice-Governor |
| 31st | Francisco Lacerda de Aguiar | January 31, 1955 | January 31, 1959 | Elected |
| - | Carlos Fernando Monteiro Lindenberg | January 31, 1959 | October 10, 1959 | Elected |
| 32nd | Raul Giuberti | October 10, 1959 | July 6, 1962 | Elected as Carlos Fernando Monteiro Lidenberg's Vice-Governor |
| 33rd | Hélsio Pinheiro Cordeiro | July 6, 1962 | August 5, 1962 | President of the Chamber of the State's Representatives (second legal successor) |
| 34th | Asdrúbal Martins Soares | August 5, 1962 | January 31, 1963 | Appointed by the Chamber of the State's Representatives to finish the 1959-1963 term. |
| - | Francisco Lacerda de Aguiar | January 31, 1963 | April 5, 1966 | Elected |
| 35th | Rubens Rangel | April 5, 1966 | January 31, 1967 | Elected as Francisco Lacerda de Aguiar's Vice-Governor |
| 36th | Cristiano Dias Lopes Filho | January 31, 1967 | March 15, 1971 | Appointed by the Chamber of the State's Representatives |
| 37th | Artur Carlos Gerhardt Santos | March 15, 1971 | March 15, 1975 | Appointed by the Chamber of the State's Representatives |
| 38th | Élcio Álvares | March 15, 1975 | March 15, 1979 | Appointed by the Chamber of the State's Representatives |
| 39th | Eurico Vieira Resende | March 15, 1979 | March 15, 1983 | Appointed by the Chamber of the State's Representatives |
| 40th | Gerson Camata | March 15, 1983 | May 14, 1986 | Elected |
| 41st | José Moraes | May 14, 1986 | March 15, 1987 | Elected as Gerson Camata's Vice-Governor |
| 42nd | Max Freitas Mauro | March 15, 1987 | March 15, 1991 | Elected |
| 43rd | Albuíno Cunha de Azeredo | March 15, 1991 | January 1, 1995 | Elected |
| 44th | Vitor Buaiz | January 1, 1995 | January 1, 1999 | Elected |
| 45th | José Ignácio Ferreira | January 1, 1999 | January 1, 2003 | Elected |
| 46th | Paulo Hartung | January 1, 2003 | January 1, 2011 | Elected (for the term 2003-2007); re-elected (for the term (2007–2011) |
| 47th | Renato Casagrande | January 1, 2011 | January 1, 2015 | Elected |
| 48th | Paulo Hartung | January 1, 2015 | January 1, 2019 | Elected |
| 49th | Renato Casagrande | January 1, 2019 | present | Elected |
