= Henrique da Silva Coutinho =

Brazilian politician

President (governor) of Espirito Santo (appointed)
- In office November 20, 1890 – June 7, 1891
- Preceded by: Constante Gomes Sodré
- Succeeded by: Antonio Gomez Aguirre

President (governor) of Espirito Santo (elected by the people)
- In office June 16, 1904 – May 23, 1908
- Preceded by: Argeu Hortênsio Monjardim
- Succeeded by: Jerônimo de Sousa Monteiro

Henrique da Silva Coutinho was the fourth president (governor) of the Brazilian state of Espírito Santo. He was appointed for the function by the President of Brazil, Marshall Manuel Deodoro da Fonseca, and governed the state from November 20, 1890 to March 11, 1891.

He had a second term as governor of Espirito Santo, from June 16, 1904 to May 23, 1908, now elected by the people.
