= Afonso Cláudio (politician) =

Brazilian politician (1859–1934)

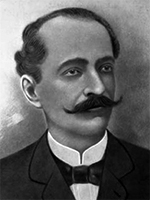

President of Espírito Santo
- In office November 22, 1889 – January 7, 1890
- Preceded by: José Caetano Rodrigues Horta
- Succeeded by: José Horácio Costa

Personal details
- Born: Afonso Cláudio de Freitas Rosa; August 2, 1859 Santa Leopoldina, Espírito Santo, Brazil
- Died: July 16, 1934 (aged 74) Rio de Janeiro, Brazil
- Occupation: Law enforcer, lawyer, judge, writer, teacher

Afonso Cláudio de Freitas Rosa (2 August 1859 – 16 June 1934), best known as Afonso Cláudio was a Brazilian politician and professor who served as governor of Espírito Santo from 22 November 1889 to 7 January 1890.

== Biography ==
He was born to landowner parents in the rural zone of central Espírito Santo. He studied at the Faculty of Law of Recife, graduating in 1883. Back to Espírito Santo, he radicated at its capital, Vitória, where he worked as a public law enforcer.

In his youth, he joined the movement for the abolition of the slavery in Brazil and became a republican activist. Afonso Cláudio was also a supporter of the European immigration to Espírito Santo.

Following the Republican coup d'état that put an end to the Empire of Brazil, Afonso Cláudio was appointed president of Espírito Santo by the new-installed government. He occupied the office for a brief time though, being appointed later for the state's Court of Justice, which he presided as well.

Afonso Cláudio was also a professor at the Faculty of Law of the Fluminense Federal University, a poet and writer, being his most important books History of Espirito-Santensis Literature, Rhimes and Songs of Espírito Santo and The Insurrection of Queimado, an essay on the slave rebellion that took place on Espírito Santo in 1849.

He was a founding member of the Academia Espírito-santense de Letras.
