= Bernardino de Sousa Monteiro =

Brazilian politician (1865–1930)

President (governor) of Espírito Santo (elected by the people)
- In office May 23, 1916 – May 23, 1920
- Preceded by: Marcondes Alves de Sousa
- Succeeded by: Nestor Gomez

Bernardino de Sousa Monteiro (October 6, 1865 in Cachoeiro de Itapemirim ES – May 12, 1930) was a Brazilian politician. He was representative on Espírito Santo's State Chamber and on the Brazilian Federal Chamber, Senator of the State of Espírito Santo and, also, the 15th president (governor) of the state of Espírito Santo, from May 23, 1916, to May 23, 1920. He was elected by the people.
