= Constante Gomes Sodré =

Brazilian politician

President of Espírito Santo
- In office September 9, 1890 – November 20, 1890
- Preceded by: José Horácio Costa
- Succeeded by: Henrique da Silva Coutinho

President (governor) of Espirito Santo (elected by the people)
- In office September 23, 1897 – January 6, 1898
- Preceded by: Graciano dos Santos Neves
- Succeeded by: José Marcelino Pessoa de Vasconcellos

Personal details
- Born: 22 December 1850
- Died: 29 September 1921 (aged 70)

Constante Gomes Sodré (22 December 1850 – 29 September 1921) was the third president (governor) of the Brazilian state of Espírito Santo. He was appointed by the President of Brazil, Marshall Manuel Deodoro da Fonseca, and governed the state from September 9, 1890 to November 20, 1890.

He was elected vice-president (vice-governor) of the state in 1896. On September 23, 1897, governor Graciano dos Santos Neves resigned, making Sodré governor again until January 6, 1898, when a new elected governor, José Marcelino Pessoa de Vasconcellos, came into office to finish the 1896–1900 term.
