= José Horácio Costa =

Brazilian politician

President of Espírito Santo
- In office January 7, 1890 – September 9, 1890
- Preceded by: Afonso Cláudio de Freitas Rosa
- Succeeded by: Constante Gomes Sodré

José Horácio Costa was the second president (governor) of the Brazilian state of Espírito Santo. He was the legal substitute of the former governor, Afonso Cláudio de Freitas Rosa. Both were appointed by the President of Brazil, Marshall Manuel Deodoro da Fonseca, as governor and vice-governor.
