= Antônio Gomes Aguirre =

Brazilian politician

President of Espírito Santo
- In office 11 March 1891 – 7 June 1891
- Preceded by: Henrique da Silva Coutinho
- Succeeded by: Alfeu Adolfo Monjardim de Andrade e Almeida

Antônio Gomes Aguirre was the fifth president (governor) of the Brazilian state of Espírito Santo. He was appointed for the function by the President of Brazil, Marshall Manuel Deodoro da Fonseca, and governed the state from 11 March to 7 June 1891.
