= Alfeu Adolfo Monjardim de Andrade e Almeida =

Brazilian politician (1836–1924)

President (governor) of Espirito Santo (appointed)
- In office June 7, 1891 – December 8, 1891
- Preceded by: Antonio Gomez Aguirre
- Succeeded by: a governing junta formed by Inácio Henrique de Gouveia, Graciano dos Santos Neves and Galdino Teixeira de Barros Loreto.

Alfeu Adolfo Monjardim de Andrade e Almeida, Baron of Monjardim (April 20/28, 1836 in Vitória, Espírito Santo – June 6/7, 1924 in Chácara de Capixaba, Vitória, Espírito Santo) was the sixth president (governor) of the Brazilian state of Espírito Santo, and the first to be elected by the people of the state.

== Political career ==
The Baron of Monjardim governed Espirito Santo from June 7, 1891, to December 8, 1891, when he resigned the office due to the coup d'état that led Marshall Manuel Deodoro da Fonseca to renounce the presidency of Brazil. Monjardin also knew the newly inaugurated president, the former vice-president Marshall Floriano Peixoto would not be following the 1890s Constitution of Brazil's article that demanded a new election if the President resigned, was impeached or died before the middle of the term, which was the case and to which he didn't agree as well.

Monjardim still wanted to transfer the office to his vice-governor, Antonio Gomez Aguirre, but the government of the State was promptly taken over by an intervention that impeded Aguirre to even be inaugurated and set up a governing junta formed by Inácio Henrique de Gouveia, Graciano dos Santos Neves, and Galdino Teixeira de Barros Loreto.

== Family ==
Monjardim's parents were Colonel of the National Guard José Francisco de Andrade e Almeida Monjardim (Brazil, February 9, 1797 – Vitória, Espírito Santo, January 24, 1884) (son of Inácio João Monjardim, born at Encarnação, Lisbon, December 27, 1742, of Italian ancestry, and wife Ana Luísa Porto) and wife Ana Francisca Maria da Penha Benedita Homem de Azevedo (daughter of Francisco Pinto Homem de Azevedo and wife Francisca de Sampaio Pereira Porto). He worked as inspector of custom house in Rio de Janeiro, from what he retired in 1881.

== Honours ==
He was a Knight of the Order of Christ (an old Portuguese Knight Order). Prior to becoming the first elected governor of Espirito Santo, he already had been the administrator of the imperial province of Espirito Santo on four occasions, as well as representative (Deputado), first in the province's chamber and later in the imperial chamber. The title was granted him on August 24/September 29, 1889, by Pedro II of Brazil.

== Marriage and children ==
He married Laurinda Luísa Pinto Pereira and had several children, including José Francisco Monjardim, who was a deputy in the Brazilian federal parliament from 1900 to 1905. He had a large number of descendants, being the Brazilian singer Maysa Matarazzo one of them.

== See also ==
- List of governors of Espírito Santo
