= Conceição de Macabu =

- Municipality
- Município de Conceição de Macabu
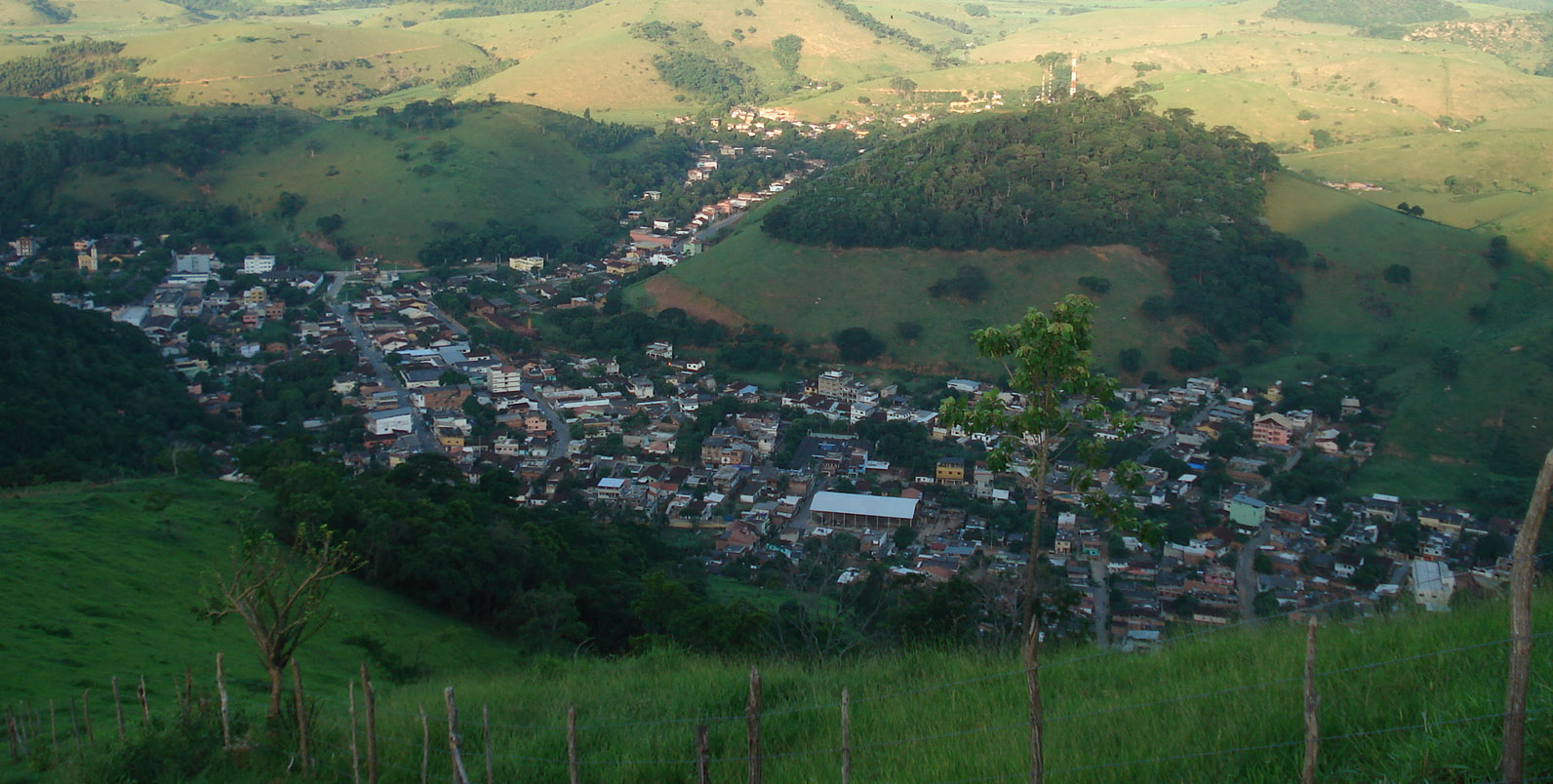

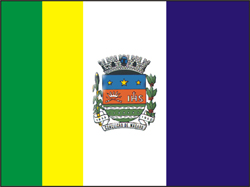
- Flag Coat of arms

- Location of Conceição de Macabu in the state of Rio de Janeiro

- Location of Conceição de Macabu in Brazil
- Coordinates: 22°05′06″S 41°52′04″W
- Country: Brazil
- Region: Southeast
- State: Rio de Janeiro

Government
  - Prefeito: Claudio Eduardo Barbosa Linhares (PMDB)

Area
  - Total: 348.328 km^{2} (134.490 sq mi)
- Elevation: 39 m (128 ft)

Population (2020)
  - Total: 23,398
- Time zone: UTC-3 (UTC-3)

Conceição de Macabu (Portuguese pronunciation: [kũsejˈsɐ̃w dʒi mɐkɐˈbu]) is a municipality located in the Brazilian state of Rio de Janeiro. Its population was 23,398 (2020) and its area is 348 km^{2}.
