= Galdino Teixeira de Barros Loreto =

Brazilian politician

President (governor) of Espirito Santo (interventor)
- In office December 8, 1891 – May 3, 1892
- Preceded by: Alfeu Adolfo Monjardim de Andrade e Almeida
- Succeeded by: José de Melo Carvalho Muniz Freire

Galdino Teixeira de Barros Loreto was a Brazilian politician. He was interventor on the government of the state of Espírito Santo from December 8, 1891, to May 3, 1892 as part of a governing junta composed also of Inácio Henrique de Gouveia and Graciano dos Santos Neves.
