= Espírito Santo =

State of Brazil

- State
- Flag Coat of arms
- Motto: Trabalha e Confia (Portuguese) "Work and trust"
- Anthem: Hino do Espírito Santo
- Location in Brazil
- Coordinates: 20.25°S 40.28°W
- Country: Brazil
- Region: Southeast
- Capital: Vitória
- Largest city: Serra

Government
  - Type: Unitary state
  - Governor: Ricardo Ferraço (MDB)
  - Vice Governor: Vacant
  - Senators: Fabiano Contarato (PT); Magno Malta (PL); Marcos do Val (Avante)
  - Legislature: Legislative Assembly of Espírito Santo

Area
  - Total: 46,077.5 km^{2} (17,790.6 sq mi)
  - Rank: 23rd

Population (2022)
  - Total: 3,833,712
  - Estimate (2024): 4,102,129
  - Rank: 15th
  - Density: 83.2014/km^{2} (215.491/sq mi)
  - Rank: 7th
- Demonym: Capixaba

GDP (2024)
  - Total: R$233.642 billion (US$43.356 billion)

HDI
  - Year: 2024
  - Category: 0.804 – very high (10th)
- Time zone: UTC−03:00 (BRT)
- Postal Code: 29000-000 to 29990-000
- ISO 3166 code: BR-ES
- Website: www.es.gov.br

Espírito Santo (Portuguese: [(i)sˈpiɾitu ˈsɐ̃tu]; lit. 'Holy Spirit') is a state in southeastern Brazil. Its capital is Vitória, and its largest city is Serra. With an extensive coastline, the state hosts some of the country's main ports, and its beaches are significant tourist attractions.

The state is divided into 78 municipalities. The capital, Vitória, is located on an island, which borders the municipalities of Vila Velha, Cariacica, and Serra. These municipalities, plus the outer cities of Fundão and Guarapari, constitute the state's main metro area. In the northern extremes of Espírito Santo is Itaúnas, in the municipality of Conceição da Barra, which is a tourist location known for its sand dunes and forró tradition.

The Captaincy of Espírito Santo was carved out of the Captaincy of Bahia in the 18th century, during the colonial rule of Brazil, and named after a 16th-century captaincy covering roughly the same area of coast. Following the elevation of Brazil to a constituent kingdom of the United Kingdom of Portugal, Brazil and the Algarves in 1815, prompted by the transfer of the Portuguese Court to Brazil, Espírito Santo was elevated to a province. After the independence of Brazil in 1822, it became a province of the newly established Empire of Brazil, and after Brazil became a republic in 1889, it was granted statehood. In the early 20th century, its current state symbols were adopted.

== Etymology ==
Espírito Santo's namesake is the Christian Holy Ghost (also known as the Holy Spirit).

== Demonym ==
Debate exists as to the origin of the term capixaba, the unofficial demonym for those born in Espírito Santo. "Capixaba" is Tupi for "corn hair", reportedly because the blond hair of the European settlers reminded the Amerindian natives of the golden color of corn. A more mainstream explanation is that the name is a metaphor for a corn-grower; Vitória Island is known to have been full of corn plantations in the early centuries of Portuguese rule in Brazil. A third etymology is from the name of a local tribe, borrowed by the Portuguese during the colonial period.

Originally, capixaba referred only to people from Vitória, but in common parlance, it eventually came to refer to those born anywhere in the state. The official state demonym, however, is "espírito-santense".

== History ==
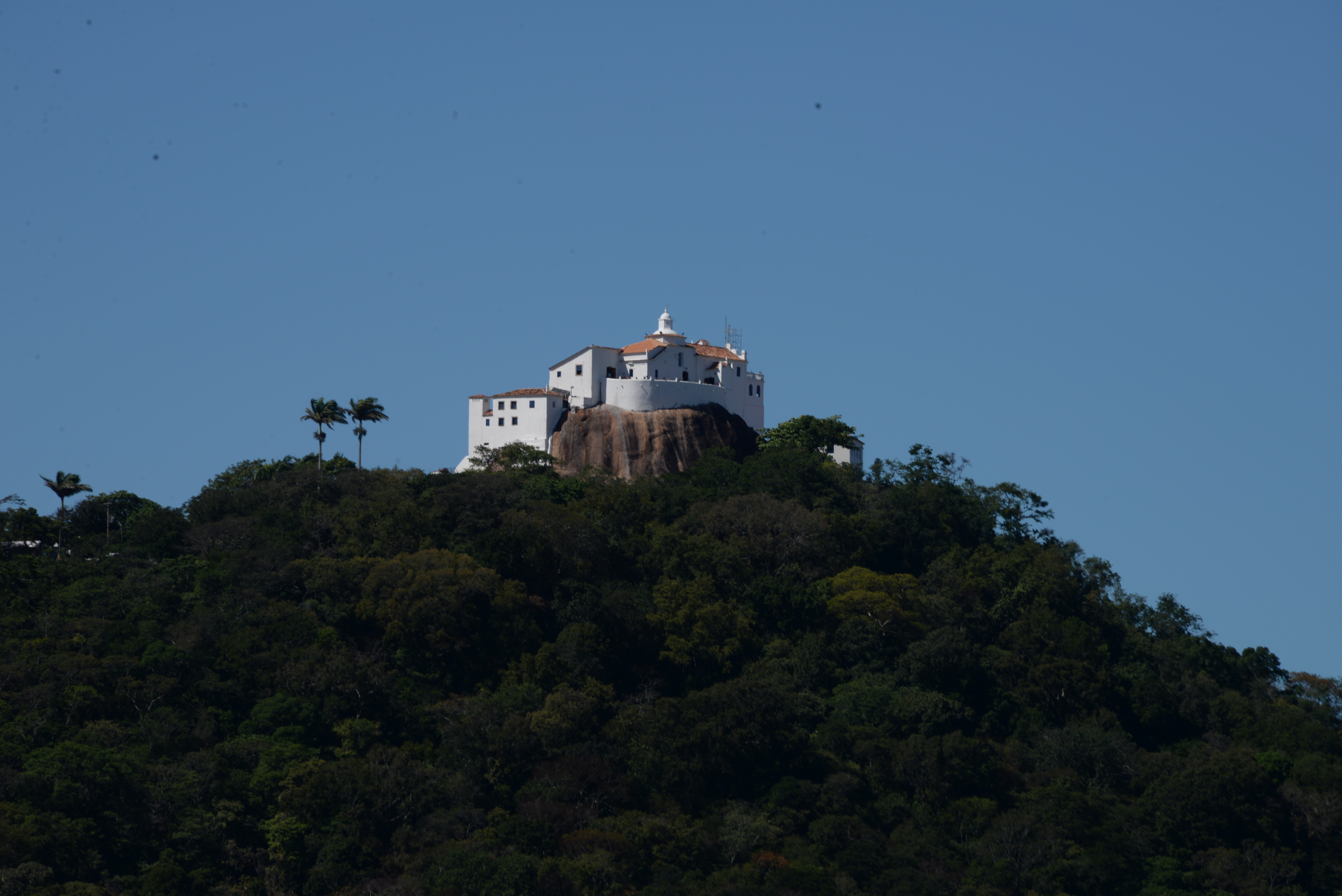
The Penha Convent, founded in 1558

Espírito Santo was first inhabited by Amerindians, whose different tribes were usually semi-nomadic, but precolonial Brazil has no recorded history. The area was colonized by the Portuguese starting in the 16th century, and received African slaves, and later, European immigrants of various origins.

=== Colonial era and Empire of Brazil ===
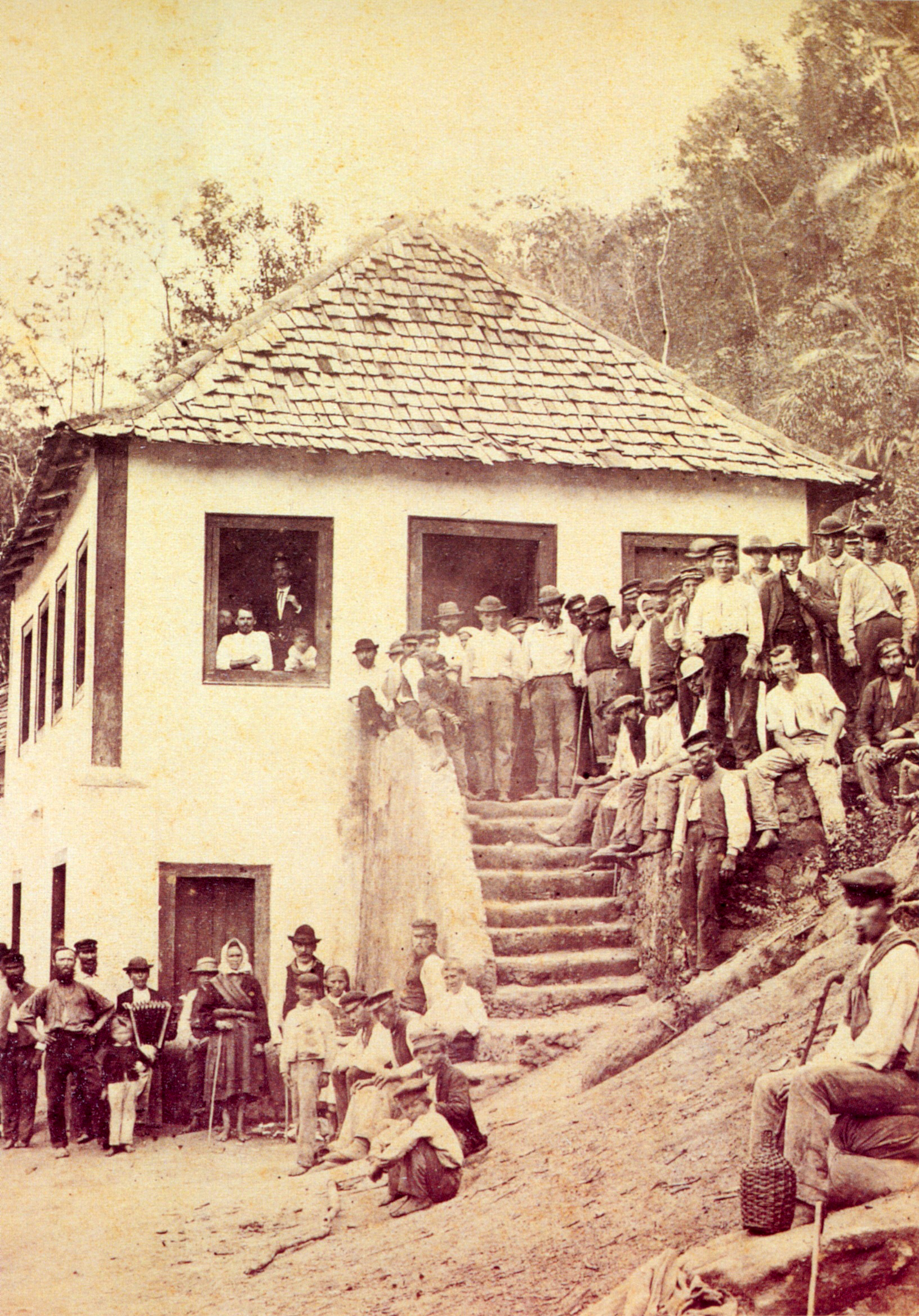
German and Luxembourgish immigrants in Espírito Santo in 1875

The Captaincy of Espírito Santo, a hereditary fief, was granted to Vasco Coutinho by Manuel I of Portugal around three decades after the Portuguese first landed in Brazil in 1500. He arrived at the captaincy to serve his term on 23 May 1535, bringing a retinue of 60 soldiers, colonists, slaves, and servants. They settled on Vitória Island and around the Bay of Vitória.

The capital was at first established in Vila Velha, but due to frequent raids by Amerindians, it was moved to the current capital of Vitória, founded on 8 September 1551, on an island near Vila Velha, which was later named Vitória Island.

In 1556, after the arrival of European missionaries, the cities Serra, Nova Almeida, and Santa Cruz were founded.

The captaincy remained under the influence of Coutinho's family for 140 years. It was elevated to province status in 1821, following the 1815 elevation of Brazil to a constituent kingdom of the United Kingdom of Portugal, Brazil, and the Algarves, prompted by the 1808 transfer of the Portuguese court to Brazil. The Portuguese court were fleeing the Napoleonic Invasion of Portugal (1807).

After the Independence of Brazil in 1822, Espírito Santo's provincial status was kept, and it was headed by an appointed provincial president. Emperor Pedro II, who was on good terms with the provincial president, visited the Espírito Santo in 1860, during one of his tours of Brazil.

=== Modern history ===
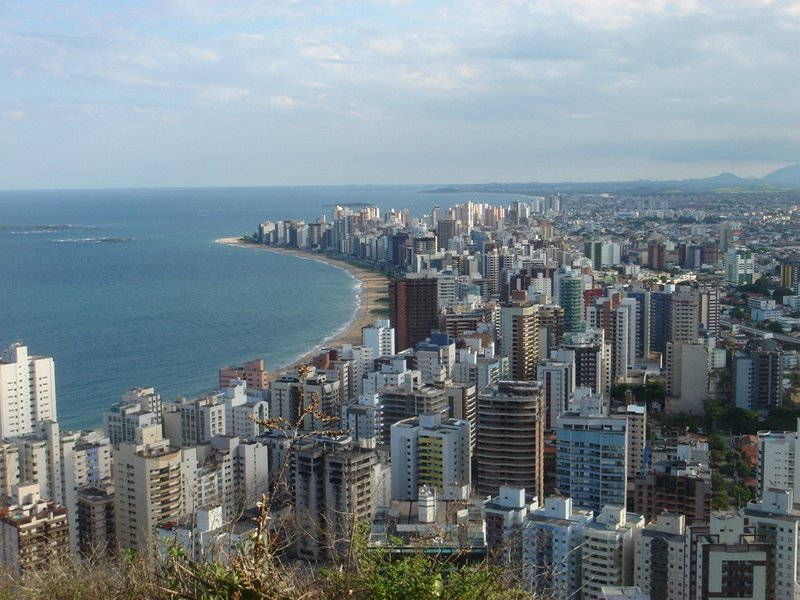
Vila Velha, the most populous municipality in the state

In 1889, with the advent of the First Brazilian Republic, Espírito Santo was made one of the states of Brazil. Afonso Cláudio de Freitas Rosa was appointed the first governor of the state by the provisional government. He was followed by four other appointed governors (José Horácio Costa, Constante Gomes Sodré, Henrique da Silva Coutinho, and Antônio Gomez Aguirre) until the first elected governor of Espírito Santo, Alfeu Adolfo Monjardim de Andrade e Almeida, was inaugurated on 7 June 1891.

During the Vargas Era, state governors were indirectly elected by Congress. A short period of democracy existed during the Second Brazilian Republic; Carlos Monteiro Lindenberg was elected governor. However, after the 1964 coup d'état, governors were once again chosen by the national assembly. After Cristiano Dias Lopes, Arthur Carlos Gerhard Santos, Élcio Álvares, and Eurico Rezende were chosen in this fashion, the military government slowly redemocratized, culminating in the adoption of Brazil's current 1988 Constitution. Democratic elections were held for the filling of every term, up to the incumbent, Renato Casagrande.

== Economy ==
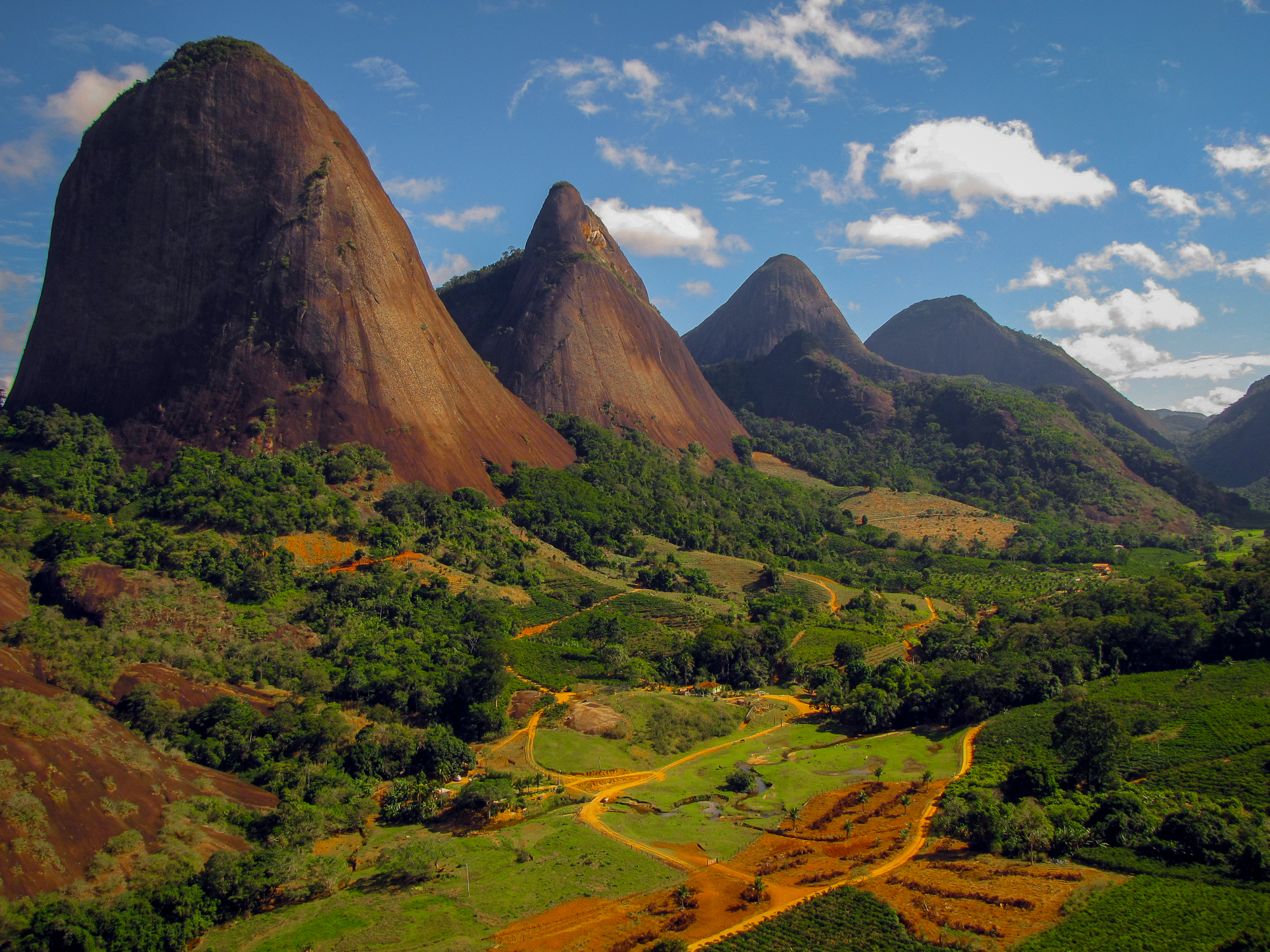
Pontões Capixabas Natural Monument

During the first three centuries of Portuguese colonialism, the main cash crop was sugarcane, until coffee, in high demand in Europe, overtook it in the mid-19th century. During the colonial era, periods of gold rush occurred, when agriculture was neglected, leading to food shortages, but not as much gold was found in Espírito Santo, as in the neighbouring states of São Paulo and Minas Gerais. Another reason for the subdued expansion was the colonial administration's prohibition of the laying roads leading into Minas Gerais, as gold could be smuggled through the state.

== Geography ==
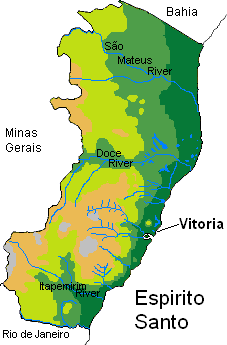
Geography of Espírito Santo

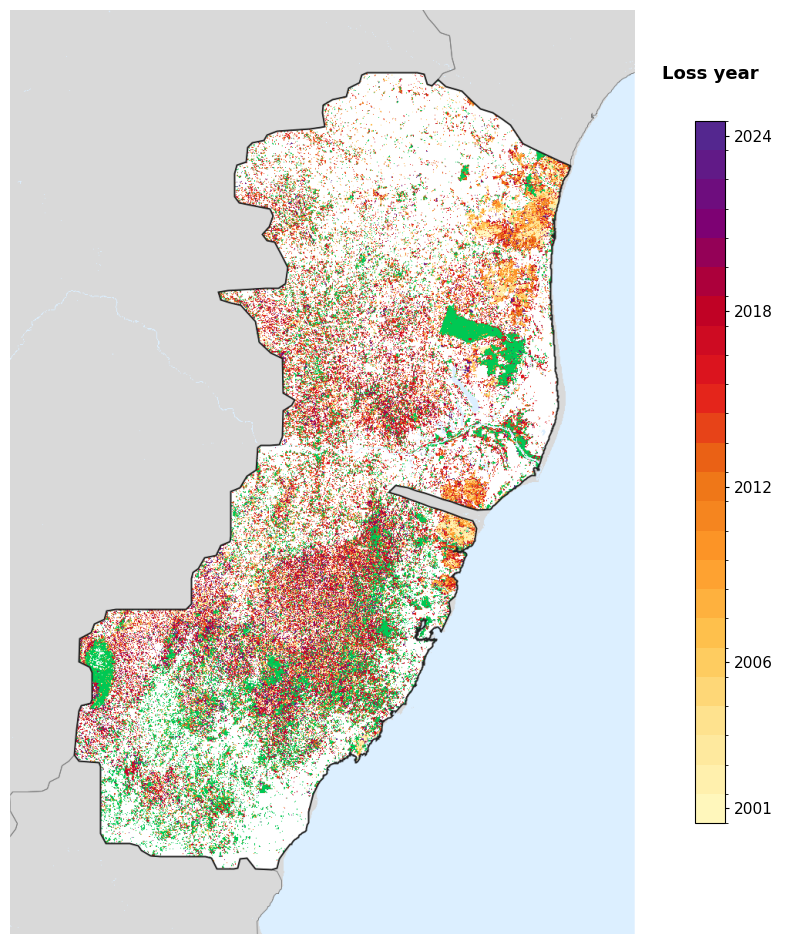
Tree-cover loss year in Espírito Santo, 2001-2024, from the Global Forest Change dataset.

With 46,180 square kilometers (17,830 sq mi), it is about the size of Estonia, or half the size of Portugal, and has a variety of habitats including coastal plains, lakes, mountainous forests, mangroves and many others.

The volcanic islands of Trindade and Martim Vaz, 715 kilometers (444 mi) east of Vitória in the southern Atlantic Ocean, are part of Espírito Santo.

=== Location ===
Climate of Espírito Santo

This Brazilian state is in the east of the southeastern subdivision of Brazil, which also contains the states of São Paulo, Minas Gerais and Rio de Janeiro. It is bordered by the Atlantic Ocean (E), the state of Bahia (N), the state of Minas Gerais (N and W), and the state of Rio de Janeiro (S). Espírito Santo's main cities (outside the Greater Vitória region) are Cachoeiro de Itapemirim, Colatina, Linhares, São Mateus and Aracruz.

=== Rivers ===
The main river serving the state is the Doce (English: Sweet River). Other important river basins include the Santa Maria River basin, the northern branch of the inlets flowing into the sea near Vitória, and the Jucu River Basin, which flows into the sea at roughly the same place, but corresponds to the southern branch.

=== Climate ===
Espírito Santo's climate is tropical along the coast, with dry winters and rainy summers. North of Doce River is generally drier and also hot. In the mountainous regions in the south and southwest of the state, the tropical climate is strongly influenced by altitude, and the average temperatures are lower.

=== Lakes ===
One of the most important lake districts in Brazil lies on the banks of the Doce River. The area contains some 26 large lakes, the biggest of which is called Juparanã Lagoon.

=== Topography ===
The state can be divided into two areas: the low lying coastline and the highland area known as Serra (where one can find the 2,890-meter-tall (9,480 ft) Pico da Bandeira), which is part of the larger Serra do Caparaó range.

== Demographics ==
Historical population
Year	Pop.	±%
1872	82,137	—
1890	135,997	+65.6%
1900	209,783	+54.3%
1920	457,328	+118.0%
1940	790,149	+72.8%
1950	957,238	+21.1%
1960	1,418,348	+48.2%
1970	1,617,857	+14.1%
1980	2,063,679	+27.6%
1991	2,598,505	+25.9%
2000	3,097,498	+19.2%
2010	3,514,952	+13.5%
2022	3,833,712	+9.1%

Ethnicities of Espírito Santo in 2022.
1. Pardo (mixed-race) (49.8%)
2. White (38.6%)
3. Black (11.2%)
4. Indigenous (0.30%)
5. Asian (0.10%)

According to the 2022 census, 3,833,712 people were residing in the state. The census revealed: 1,908,803 Brown (multiracial) (49.8%), 1,479,275 White (38.6%), 429,680 Black (11.2%), 11,617 Indigenous (0.3%) and 4,268 Asian (0.1%).

The population density was 72.7 inhabitants per square kilometer (188/sq mi). Urbanization: 82.2% (2006); Population growth: 2% (1991–2000); Houses: 1,056,000 (2006).

=== Largest cities ===
Largest cities or towns in Espírito Santo (2011 census by the Brazilian Institute of Geography and Statistics)
Rank		Pop.	Rank		Pop.
1	Vila Velha	419,853	11	Viana	65,887
2	Serra	416,028	12	Nova Venécia	46,262
3	Cariacica	354,615	13	Barra de São Francisco	40,883
4	Vitória	353,626	14	Castelo	34900
5	Cachoeiro de Itapemirim	191,041	15	Marataízes	34,591
6	Linhares	141,254	16	Santa Maria de Jetibá	34,178
7	Colatina	112,431	17	São Gabriel da Palha	32,264
8	São Mateus	110,453	18	Domingos Martins	31,946
9	Guarapari	106,582	19	Itapemirim	31,208
10	Aracruz	83,152	20	Afonso Cláudio	31,003

=== Education ===
==== Educational institutions ====
- Universidade Federal do Espírito Santo (UFES) (Federal University of Espírito Santo)
- Instituto Federal do Espírito Santo (IFES)
- Faculdade Multivix (Multivix)
- Faculdades Integradas Espírito-santenses (FAESA) (Faculdades Integradas Espírito-santenses)
- Universidade Vila Velha (UVV) (Vila Velha University)
- Centro Universitário do Espírito Santo (Unesc-ES)

=== Culture ===
The precolonial Amerindians groups in Espírito Santo were the Tupiniquim, Temininó, Aymoré, Puri, and Botocudo. They have largely been absorbed into the Portuguese-Brazilian civilization, and few live in reservations or tribes.

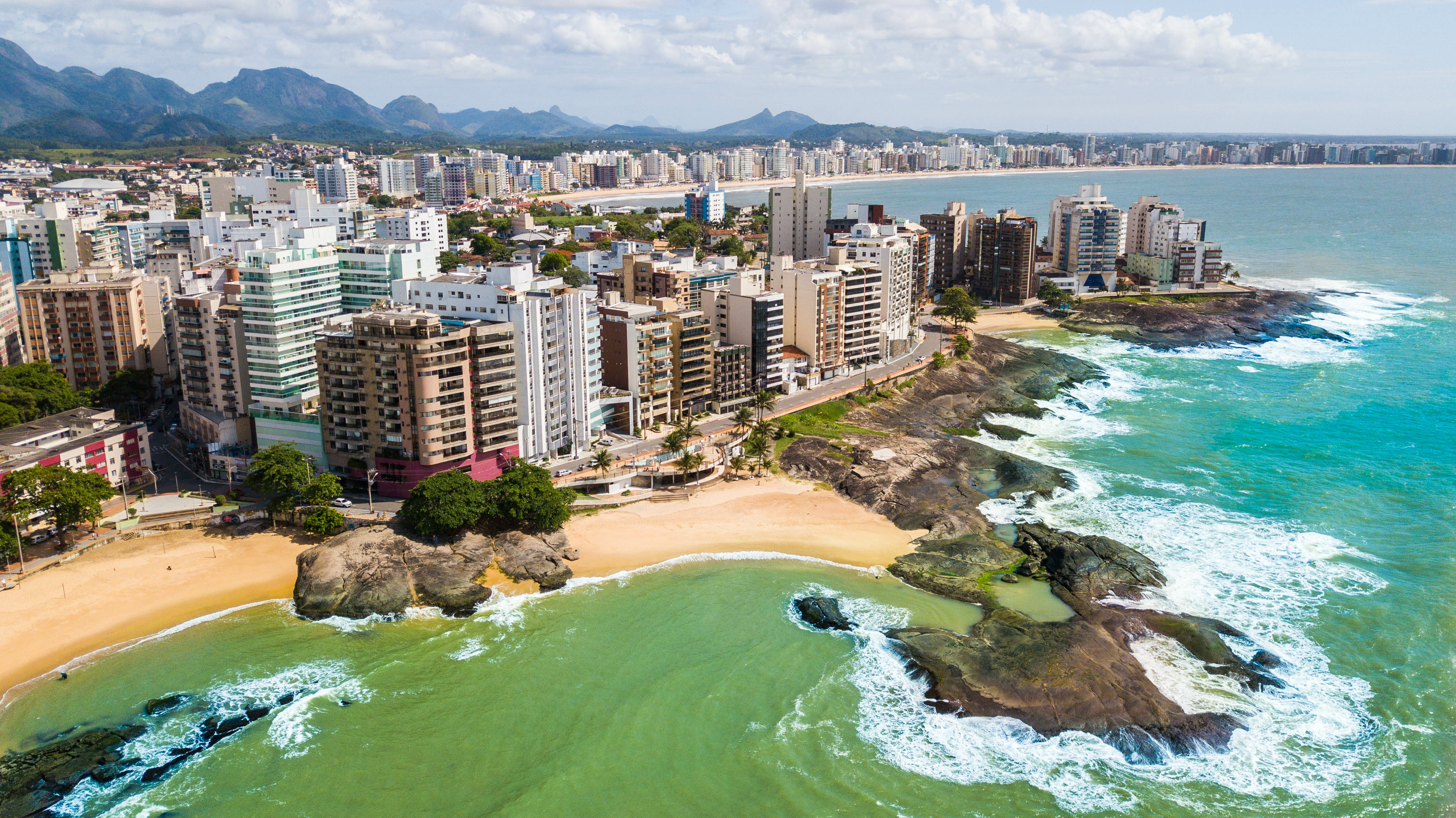
Guarapari during summer

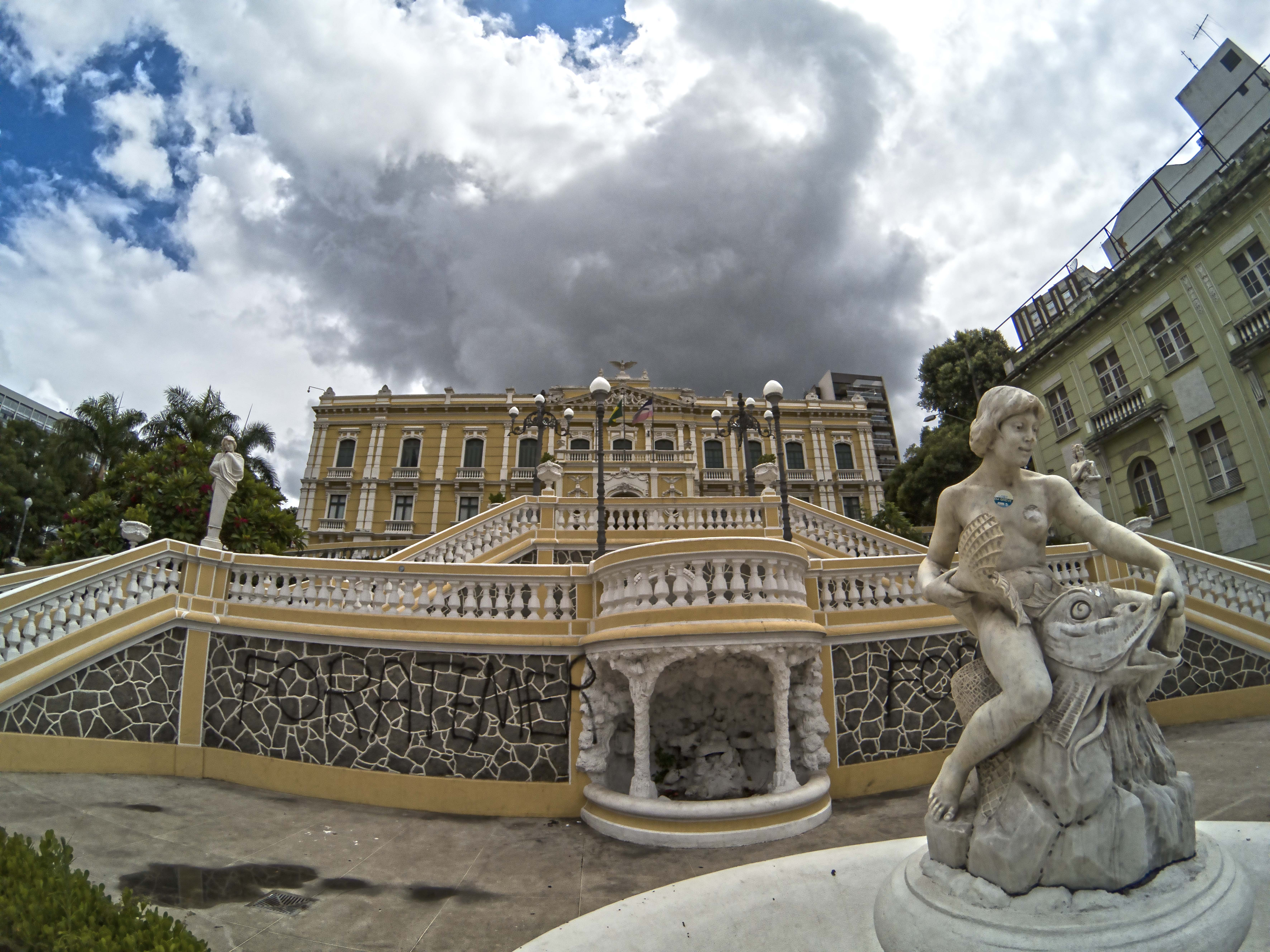
Anchieta Palace

Especially in the 16th century, several towns in Espírito Santo were founded with primarily Amerindian populations converted to Catholicism, such as Serra and Santa Cruz. Amerindian food has left its legacy in capixaba culture; the fish-based Moqueca capixaba is the state dish, among other local typical seafood dishes.

One large ethnic group in the state is known as Turcos. Technically from the region that is now Syria and Lebanon, they came to the state fleeing World War I. As at the time, they were Ottoman Empire citizens, they were commonly called "Turcos" (Turks). Large communities were established in the southern part of the state. Now, their descendants control a good share of the local commerce. The Arab-Brazilians of Espírito Santo are generally Maronite Christians.

About 60–75% of the population of Espírito Santo has Italian ancestry, making it the state with the highest percentage of Italian descendants in Brazil. They founded many towns in the area and have significant influence on capixaba society. A number of traditional Italian dance groups are still in the state, as are Italian culture festivals, such as the one held in Venda Nova do Imigrante. Italian food is also an important part of capixaba cuisine. Italian pasta and cheeses, such as mozzarella, are produced locally. Small-scale farming, which is turning increasingly towards agrotourism, is appealing to its Italian roots to exploit that market.

Germans were among the first colonists to cultivate land away from the coastal zone, and were a strong influence. The first German settlement, Santa Isabel, was founded in 1844, and still stands. Like today's capixaba Italian community, they still hold on to many aspects of their ancestors' homeland's culture, as represented in festivals such as the Sommerfest in Domingos Martins. Domingos Martins also hosts a Colonization Museum, where one can find old photos, artifacts, and documents pertaining to that settlement movement.

Espírito Santo is home to the biggest community of East Pomeranian speakers in the world. More than a century after arriving to Espírito Santo, East Pomeranian continues to be spoken and remains an important part of Espírito Santo's heritage for many people. To this day, they continue centuries-old customs within their communities.

Between 1858 and 1862, a group of Dutch settlers from Zeeuws-Vlaanderen migrated to the state. In the area of Santa Leopoldina, their dialect of Dutch, which they call Ollans but is in fact a variety of Zeeuws-Vlaams influenced by Pomeranian, is still spoken by about 20 speakers. It is therefore severely endangered.

The first African slaves in Espírito Santo arrived in Vitória in 1609, and years of slavery ensued. Espírito Santo, though, was still to play a significant part in the Brazilian abolitionist movement in the guise of its slave rebellion of 1848–1849, which required the intervention of imperial troops. Slavery began to lose its economic importance in Espírito Santo after that event.

Pinning down the exact numbers of immigrants of several ethnic groups from Europe is difficult. Many of these groups came to Espírito Santo under a common Austrian–Hungarian passport, or in the case of the Tyroleans, under an Italian passport. Tyrolean settlers were both of German and Italian language and concentrated in the region of Santa Leopoldina and Santa Teresa. Romanians (especially from Transylvania and Bukovina) and Roma usually arrived under Austrian passports. Large groups of Romani people settled in Espírito Santo's countryside in the late 19th century.

== Economy ==
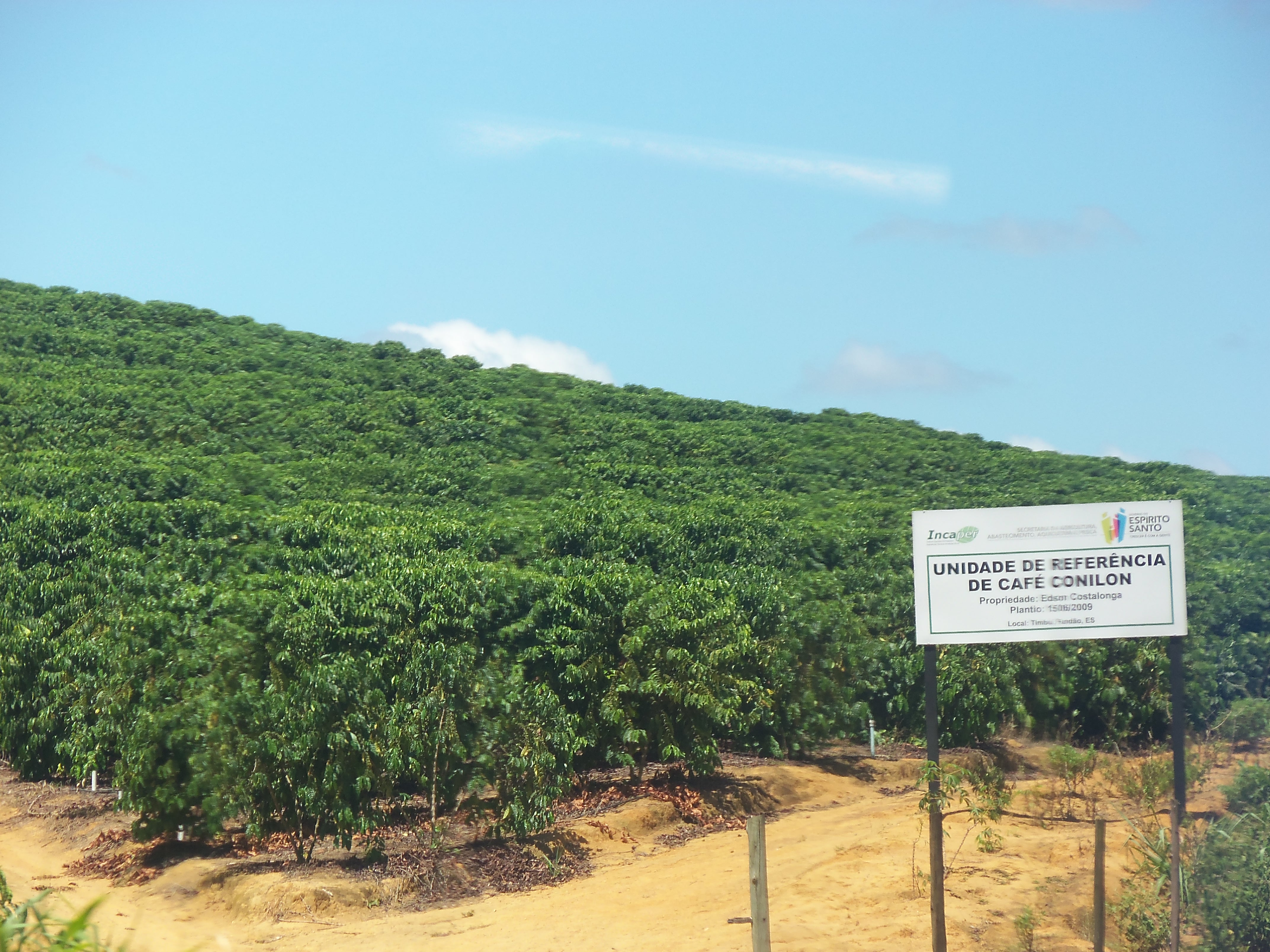
Coffea canephora in Timbuí

The service sector is the largest component of GDP at 50%, followed by the industrial sector at 44%. Agriculture represents 5% of GDP (2004). Espírito Santo's exports consisted mainly of manufacturing of iron and steel 35.8%, iron ore 25.2%, paper 17.6%, coffee 7.7%, and granite 6.5% (as of 2002).

Espírito Santo is Brazil's highest steel-producing state. The main crops grown are coffee, sugarcane, and fruits (mostly coconuts, bananas and papayas). The livestock industry is represented primarily by cattle raised for milk and beef. Industry consists mainly of canning, forestry, textiles, and iron and steel works. The latter two are concentrated around Cariacica and the Vale do Rio Doce ironworks.

Vitória is an important port for the exporting of iron and steel; the state is among the biggest steel-producing regions the world. In São Mateus, petroleum reserves have been found on the continental shelf, and are being commercially exploited.

In agricultural production, coffee, sugarcane, papaya, banana, and coconut stand out. It also produces cassava, oranges, and beans.

In 2020, Espírito Santo was the largest producer of Coffea canephora in Brazil, with a 66.3% share of the total (564.5 thousand tons, or 9.4 million 60 kg bags). In 2017, Minas accounted for 54.3% of the total national coffee production (first place), Espírito Santo accounted for 19.7% (second place) and São Paulo, 9.8% (third place).

Brazil is the world's biggest productor of sugarcane, with 672 million tons/year. In 2020, Espírito Santo harvested almost 3 million tons.

Espírito Santo was the seventh-largest national producer of bananas in 2018, with 408 thousand tons. Brazil was already the second-largest producer of the fruit in the world, currently in third place, losing only to India and Ecuador, and produced 6.7 million tons in the same year. Espírito Santo was the largest Brazilian producer of papaya in 2018, with 354 thousand tons. Brazil produced 1.06 million tons in the same year. The state was the fifth-largest producer of coconuts in Brazil in 2009, with 157 million fruits. In 2018, the state also produced cassava, in a small amount compared to Brazilian production: 115,000 tons, with the country producing 17 million tons. Espírito Santo had an orange production of around 18,000 tons in 2018, the country's 14th-largest producer state.

In the north of the state, beef cattle are raised and fattened, and the meat industry was developed; the meat is mainly shipped to Rio de Janeiro, in addition to supplying the region of Vitória. In the south, dairy farming is practiced, and milk is sold, through cooperatives, in the markets of Rio de Janeiro and Vitória. More recently developed are silviculture and fruit-growing, with use for canned fruit and cellulose production.

The total number of chickens in the state is about 9.2 million birds, and that of cattle exceeds 1.8 million head. Important reserves of granite are known and used, and extraction of natural gas and oil is increasing. Sands and marbles are also important products of Espírito Santo extractivism.

The state's subsoil is rich in minerals, including oil, with considerable reserves of limestone, marble, manganese, ilmenite, bauxite, zirconium, monazites, and rare earths, although not all are being explored. In mineral extraction, exploration of reserves of marbles, limestone, and dolomite is happening in the Cachoeiro de Itapemirim area.

Although relatively small, the industrial park in Espírito Santo is home to chemical, metallurgical, food, and paper and cellulose industries.

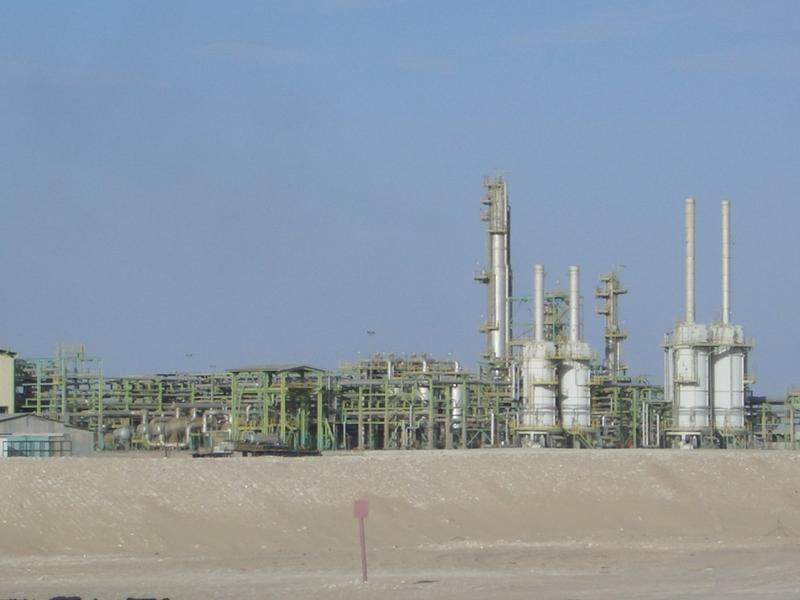
Oil production in Espírito Santo

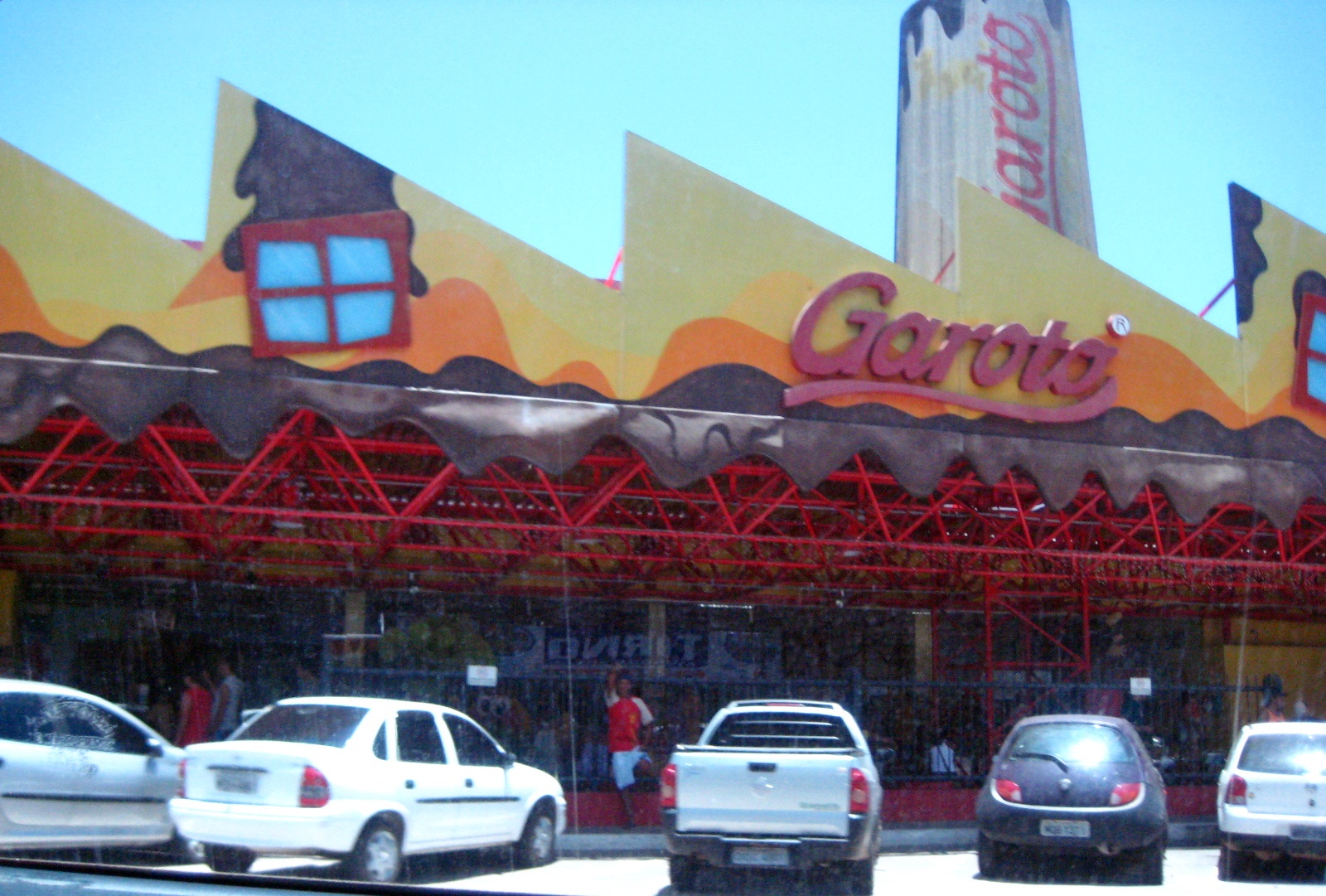
Chocolates Garoto factory in Vila Velha

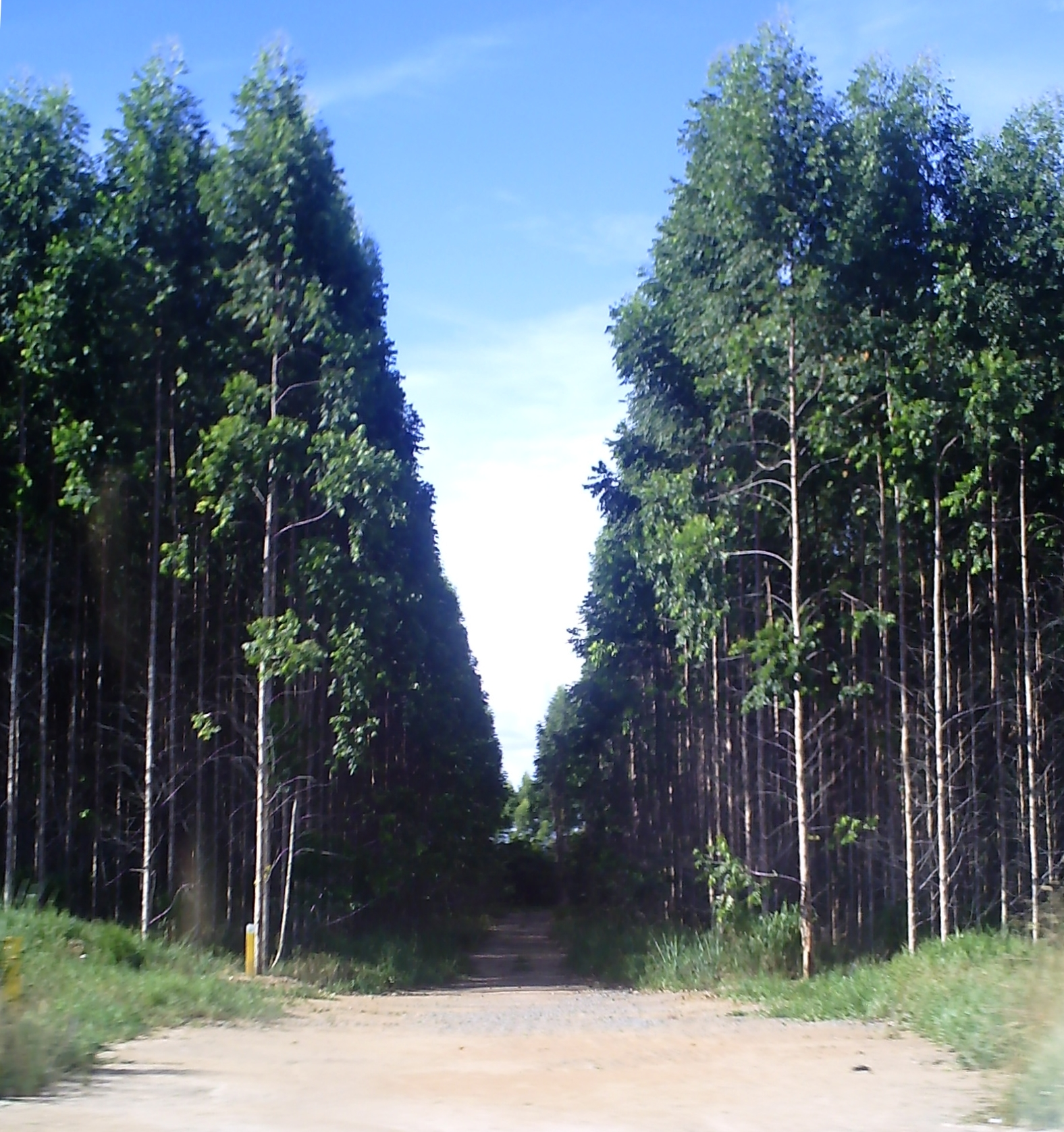
Eucalyptus from Aracruz Celulose in the city of Aracruz

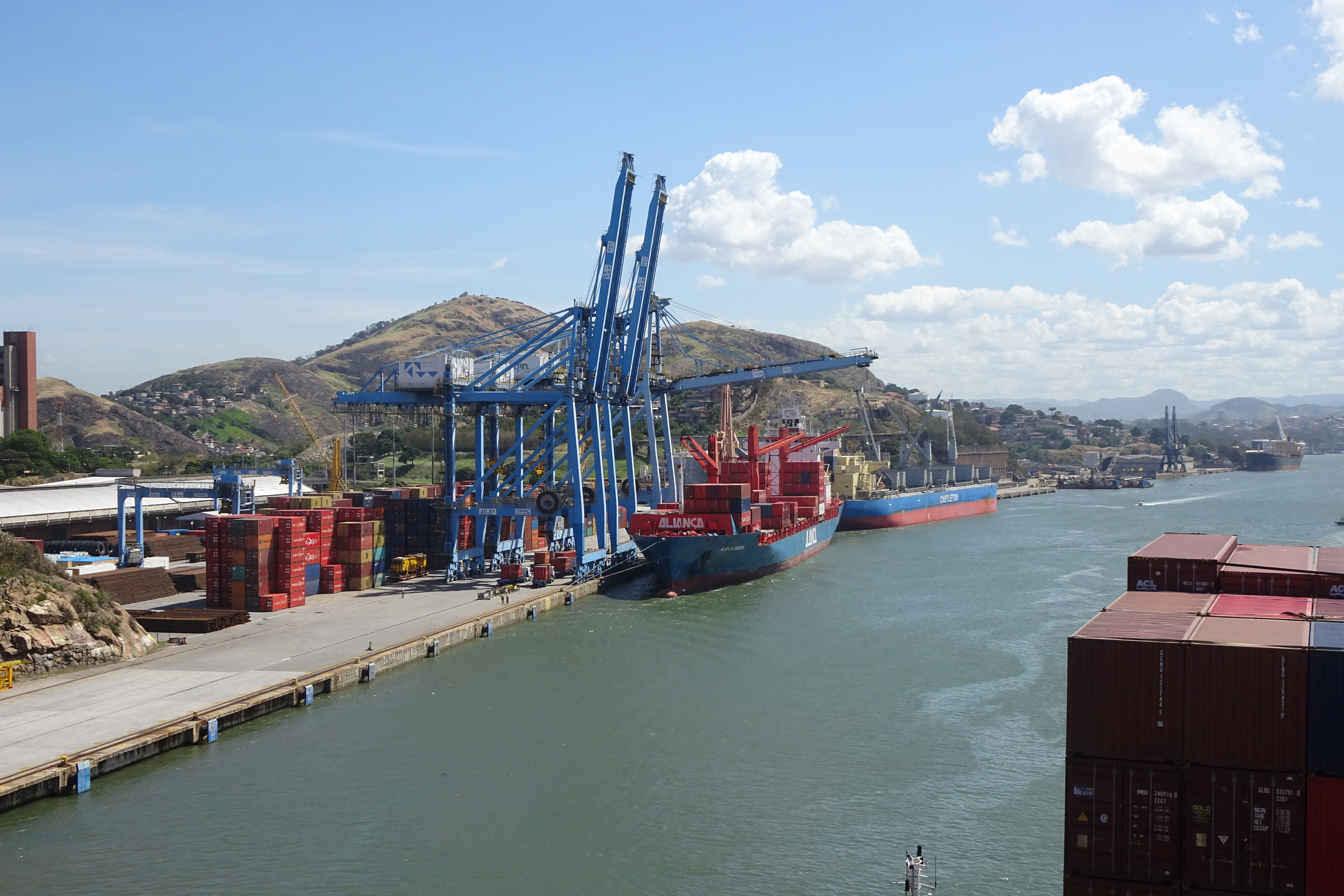
Port of Vitória

About industry, Espírito Santo in 2017 had an industrial GDP of R$21.3 billion, equivalent to 1.8% of the national industry. It employed 168,357 workers in the industry. The main industrial sectors are: extraction of oil and natural gas (23.0%), construction (20.5%), industrial services of public utility, such as electricity and water (12.3%), metallurgy (7.5%), and pulp and paper (6.6%). These sectors concentrate 69.9% of the state's industry.

In 2012, the export basket of Espírito Santo was based on iron ore (52.49%), crude oil (10.87%), chemical pulp made of soda or sulphate wood (10.01%), stone or construction (5.58%), and coffee (4.42%). Espírito Santo exports iron produced in Minas Gerais.

In the mineral extractive industry, in 2019, Rio de Janeiro was the largest producer of oil and natural gas in Brazil, with 71% of the total volume produced. São Paulo comes in second place, with an 11.5% share of total production. Espírito Santo was the third-largest producer state, with 9.4%. In recent years, Espírito Santo has stood out in the production of oil and natural gas. With several discoveries made, mainly by Petrobras, the state left the fifth position in the Brazilian ranking of reserves, in 2002, to become one of the largest oil province in the country, with total reserves of 2.5 billion barrels. About 140 thousand barrels a day are produced. Oil fields are located both on land and at sea, in shallow, deep, and ultra-deep waters, containing light and heavy oil and unassociated gas.

In the urban centers of the capital and Cachoeiro de Itapemirim, practically all the main units of the Espírito Santo transformation industry are concentrated. The steel industries are located in the capital Vitória: Companhia Ferro e Aço de Vitória, iron ore pelletizing plant of Companhia Vale do Rio Doce; lumber, textiles, crockery, instant coffee, chocolates and refrigerators. In the Itapemirim river valley, cement, sugar and alcohol, and canned fruit industries are developed.

The 10 largest industrial companies in Espírito Santo are: Companhia Vale do Rio Doce (mining), ArcelorMittal Tubarão (steel mill), Samarco Mineração (mining), Aracruz Celulose, Fertilizers Heringer, ArcelorMittal Sul Fluminense (steel mill), Escelsa (electricity distribution company), Garoto (the largest chocolate factory in Latin America and the most important industrial food company of the state) and Sol Coqueria. Espírito Santo is a major steel producer, due to two steel mills present in its territory: ArcelorMittal Tubarão (formerly Companhia Siderúrgica de Tubarão) in the capital Vitória, which in 2018 produced 7 million tons of crude steel of the 35.4 million produced in the country; and ArcelorMittal Sul Fluminense (formerly Votorantim Siderurgia), also in the capital, which produced 1 million tons of crude steel in the same year.

In the paper and cellulose sector, Brazilian pulp production was 19.691 million tons in 2019. The country exported US$7.48 billion in pulp this year, $3.25 billion only to China. Brazilian forest-based industry exports totaled $9.7 billion ($7.48 billion in cellulose, $2 billion in paper, and $265 million in wood panels). Paper production was 10.535 million tons in 2019. The country exported 2.163 million tons. In 2016, the paper and cellulose industry in the south of the country represented 33% of the national total. Espírito Santo stands out in this sector. In 2018, $920 million were traded in the sale of cellulose to the foreign market, the third-strongest Espírito Santo product in the export balance. In 2016, the top five states producing logs for paper and cellulose (mainly eucalyptus) were: Paraná (15.9 million m^{3}), São Paulo (14.7 million m^{3}), Bahia (13.6 million m^{3}), Mato Grosso do Sul (9.9 million m^{3}), and Minas Gerais (7.8 million m^{3}). Together, they correspond to 72.7% of the national production of 85.1 million m^{3}. Espírito Santo, 9th place, had a production of 4.1 million m^{3}. São Mateus, north of Espírito Santo, was the best-city in the Southeast, as the sixth-largest producer of roundwood for paper and cellulose in the country. The 10 largest producing municipalities had 22.9% of the country's production. They were the cities of Telêmaco Borba (PR), Três Lagoas (MS), Caravelas (BA), Mucuri (BA), Ortigueira (PR), São Mateus (ES), Dom Eliseu (PR), Nova Viçosa (BA), Water Clara (MS), and Ribas do Rio Pardo (MS).

The tertiary sector is underdeveloped throughout the state, but commercial activity acquires a certain importance with iron ore exports from Minas Gerais, through the Vitória a Minas Railway, and is shipped at the ports of Atalaia and Ponta do Tubarão. The connection of Cachoeiro de Itapemirim to the city of Rio de Janeiro, though, by paved highway, allowed the incorporation of the region into the Rio de Janeiro milk basin and facilitated the export of agricultural products, such as coffee, corn, manioc, rice, and vegetables.

The state's tourist activity is concentrated on the coast, where beaches, such as Itaúnas and Guarapari, are popular. The peak of Bandeira, the third-highest in the country, is another tourist destination. Lately, a new type of tourism has gained prominence: gastronomic, in which typical capixaba cuisine, heir to different cultures, is appreciated.

The road system is organized from the BR-101, which crosses Espírito Santo from north to south, bordering the coast. The state has 30,100 km of roads, but only 10% are paved.

=== Tourism ===
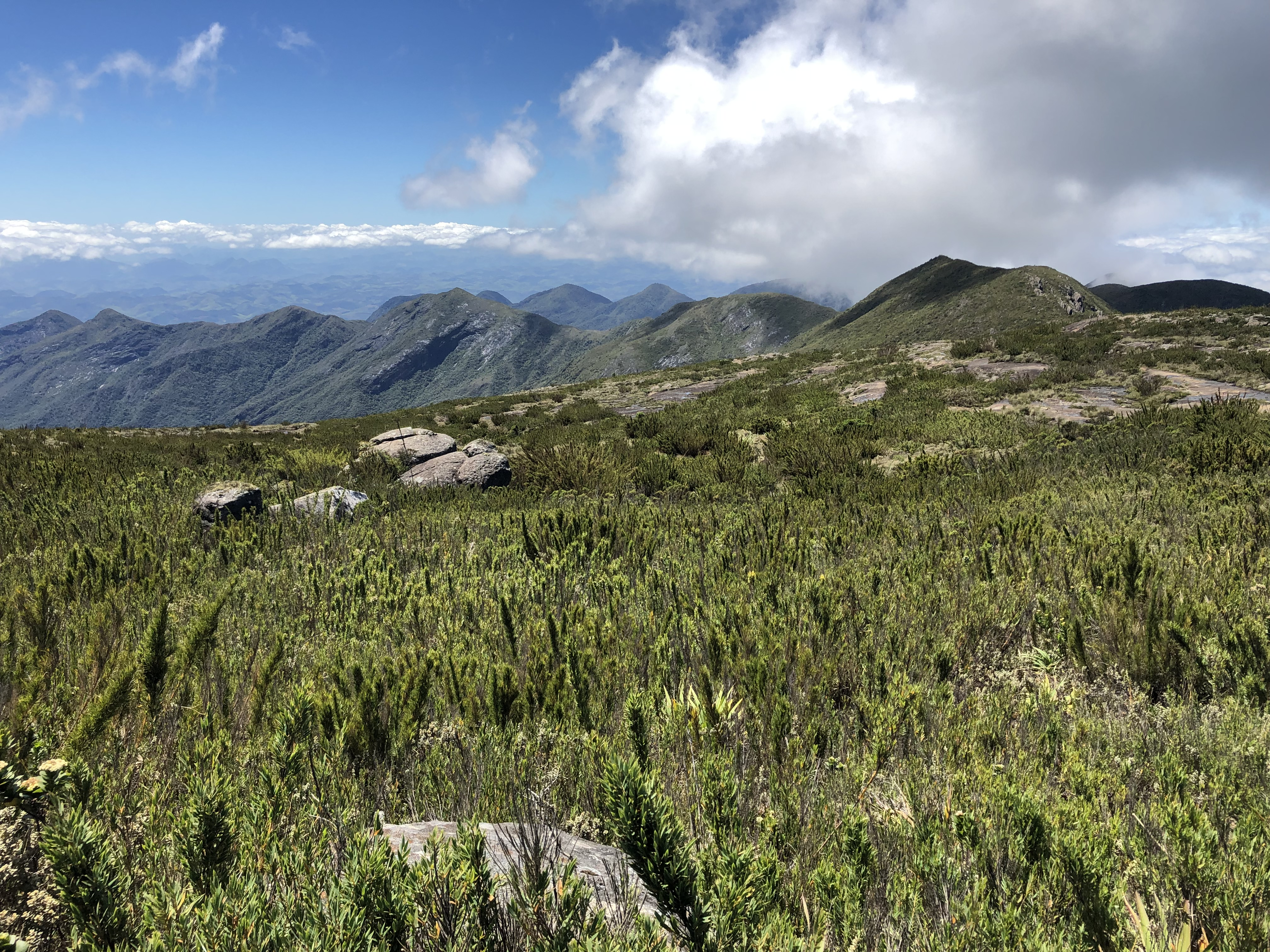
Caparaó National Park

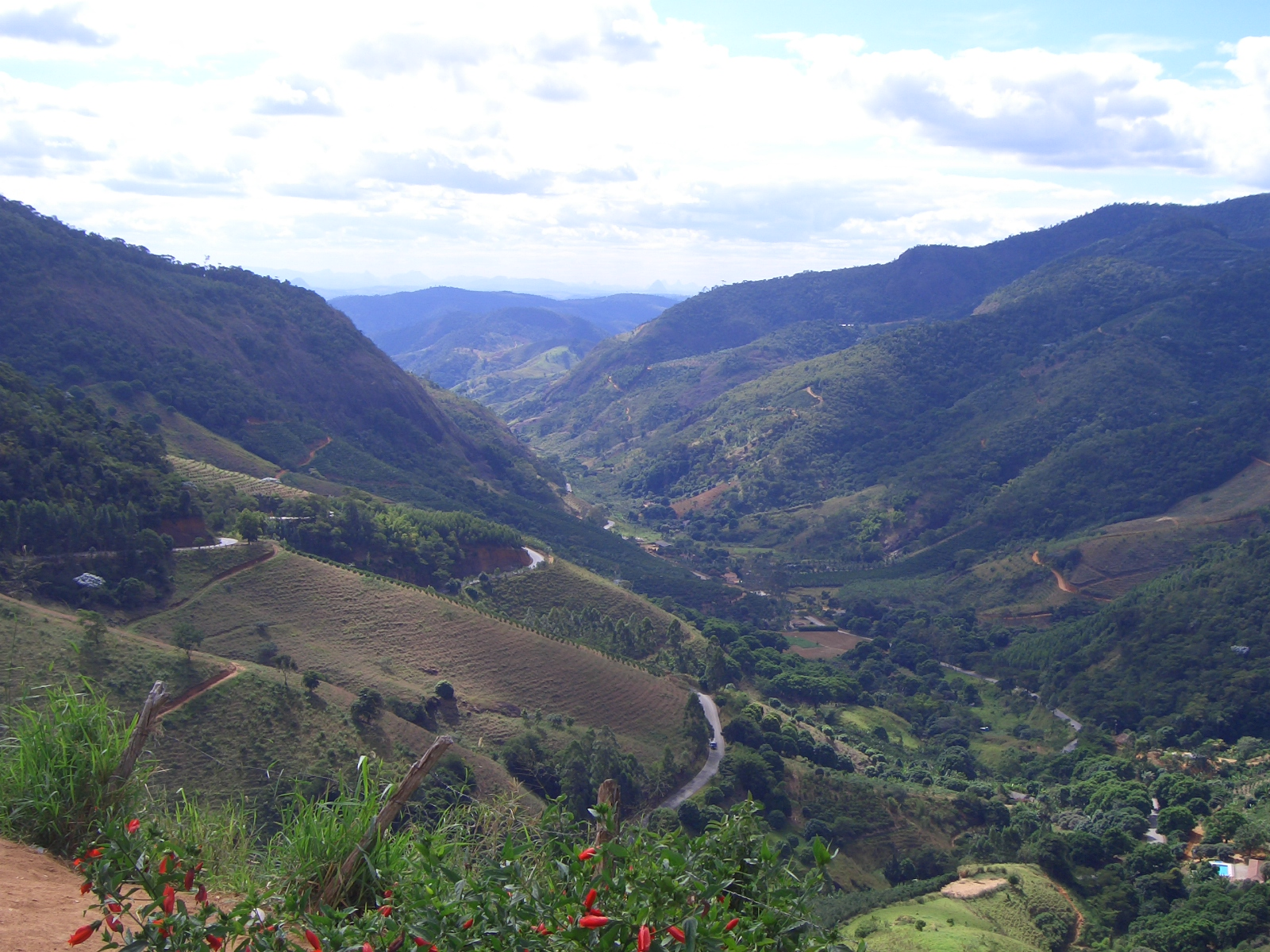
Canaã Valley, in Espírito Santo

Tourism plays an ever-increasing role in the state's economy and is a leading destination in Brazilian domestic tourism, although international tourism is present, though rarer. Tourist destinations include coastal areas such as Guarapari, Jacaraípe, and Manguinhos, and mountain retreats such as Domingos Martins. Guarapari is also a local tourist destination, known for its black sand beaches. Coastal cuisine is an attraction, with moqueca capixaba and other local seafood dishes among traditional offerings. Inland, there are many natural attractions, such as the national parks of Pedra Azul and Caparaó.

=== Transportation ===
==== Port ====
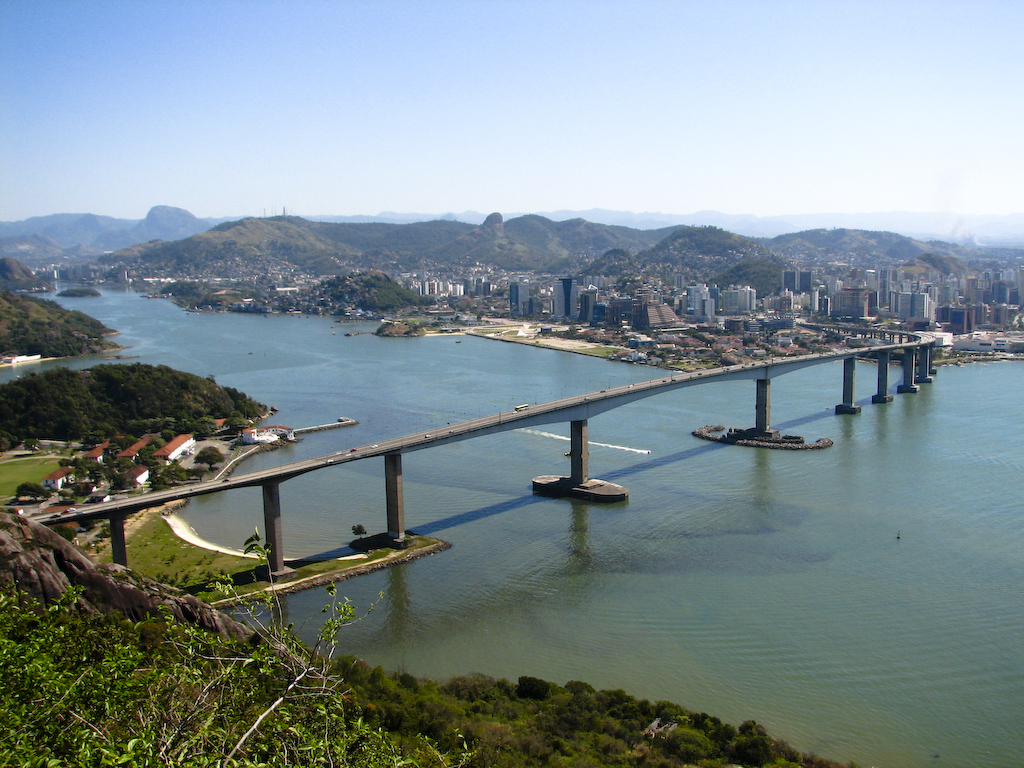
Entrance to the Port of Vitória, under the Third Bridge (the second-tallest bridge in Brazil), with Camburi Beach in the background

The port of Vitória is the most difficult to access among Brazilian ports. The bay on which it is located is extremely narrow with rocks, reefs and mountains, making it challenging for freighters and maritime cruisers to reach the docks. This narrow approach also results in ships passing closely to population centers. In Vitória, ships sail in close proximity to cars and pedestrians. The location of the port in the city center also results in scheduling complications with limitations resulting from traffic constraints. Currently, the main use of the port is for ship and oil-platform repairs as well as international shipping.

==== Airports ====
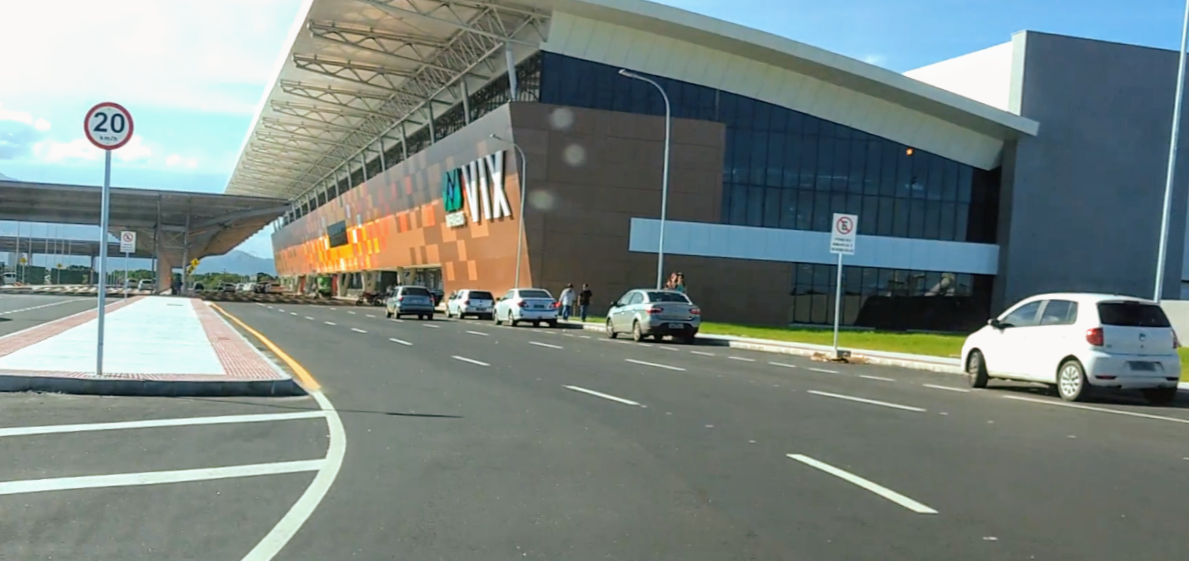
Vitória International Airport

Eurico de Aguiar Salles Airport, which serves Vitória, is located on just over 5,200 ha (13,000 acres). Since construction of its first section, finished in 1946, the airport has undergone several expansions and modernizations, but current demand has surpassed its capacity of 560,000 passengers a year. The passenger terminal has a constructed area of nearly 4,000 m^{2} (43,000 sq ft), a check-in concourse, 25 check-in counters and boarding and arrival lounges. The recent construction of new aircraft parking boxes on the aprons has increased the airport's operational efficiency.

In 2003, more than 1.2 million passengers used the airport, and in 2004 this rose to some 1.25 million. Vitória is one of the 32 airports in the Infraero network that has a cargo terminal. In May 1999, the first direct international freight connection to the United States began operating in Vitória, facilitating American imports to the state of Espírito Santo. As of 2018, there are five such flights per week. A new runway and terminal were due at the end of 2007, but several budget inconsistencies were found and construction was halted.

==== Highways serving Espírito Santo ====
- BR-101
- BR-259
- BR-262
- BR-482

== Statistics ==
- Vehicles: 1,811,993 (December 2016)
- Mobile phones: 4,417,825 (March 2015)
- Municipalities: 78 (2014)

== Flag ==
The flag of Espírito Santo is a horizontal triband of blue, white, and pink, with the state motto, Trabalha e Confia (English: "Work and trust [God]"), written across the middle band. This motto is a truncated version of the Jesuit motto "work as if everything depended on you, and trust as if everything depended on God", well spread by Spanish Catholic missionary José de Anchieta, and was chosen by Jerônimo Monteiro, who was governor of Espírito Santo from 1908 to 1912. The flag was designed in 1908, with colours inspired by those of Our Lady of Victory (Portuguese: Nossa Senhora da Vitória), the state's patron saint, wearing traditional Portuguese clothing. It is one of the few flags in the world to use pink.

== See also ==
- List of municipalities in Espírito Santo
- Federative units of Brazil
