= Brazilian German =

High and Low German dialects spoken in Brazil

- Native to: Brazil
- Language family: Indo-European: Germanic; West Germanic; Elbe Germanic and North Sea Germanic; High and Low German; Brazilian German
- Writing system: Latin script (German alphabet); German Braille

Official status
- Official language in: Brazil 17 municipalities: Antônio Carlos; Santa Maria do Herval; Domingos Martins; Itarana; Laranja da Terra; Pancas; Santa Maria de Jetibá; Vila Pavão; Itueta; Espigão d'Oeste; Pomerode; Canguçu; Ipumirim; Treze Tílias; Barão; Westfália; São João do Oeste

Language codes
- ISO 639-3: (partially included in pdt (Plautdietsch), hrx (Hunsrik), nds (Low German, more specifically East Pomeranian in Brazil))

Brazilian German is a set of languages, spoken by German Brazilians, High German and Low German, together form a significant minority language in Brazil. "Brazilian German" is strongly influenced by Portuguese and to a lesser extent by Italian dialects as well as indigenous languages. High German and Low Saxon/Low German dialects and other Germanic languages are particularly strong in Brazil's South and Southeast Regions.

German speakers from Germany, Switzerland and Austria make up the largest group of immigrants after Portuguese and Italian speakers. They tended to preserve their language longer than the speakers of Italian, which is closer to Portuguese. Consequently, German and Low Saxon/German was the second most common family language in Brazil at the 1940 census. However, even in areas that are still dominated by German speakers, most are bilingual. Today, (Low-) German is increasingly cultivated as a cultural heritage, and several municipalities have recently given co-official status with Portuguese to one Brazilian variant or another of it.

The language Hunsrik or Riograndenser Hunsrückisch is the most significant variant. It is particularly well represented in the two southernmost states, Rio Grande do Sul and Santa Catarina. But especially in Espírito Santo there are significant pockets whose dialect is based on East Low German (East Pomeranian), and some other dialects can be found locally due to 20th century immigration.

== Hunsrik ==
Hunsrik, a language derived from the Hunsrückisch dialect, is also referred to as Riograndenser Hunsrückisch (or Brazilian Hunsrückisch) after the country's southernmost state, Rio Grande do Sul. It is also strongly represented in Santa Catarina, where the local variant is referred to as Katharinensisch, and in Paraná. Together, these three states form Brazil's South Region. The area attracted significant immigration from German-speaking countries.

German immigration to Rio Grande do Sul started in 1824. The German workers and settlers came from many different regions, but especially from the poor regions Hunsrück and nearby Palatinate. The German dialects began to mix with each other, adopting elements of the languages spoken by other immigrants, to form varieties that differed from municipality to municipality, often from family to family, and which had no relation to the dialect lines in Germany. However, in most places the Hunsrück dialect proved dominant.

Initially, the immigrants had to organize their own school system, but this was to change. Due to lack of exposure – from 1938 till 1961, German was not even taught at higher schools – Standard German became restricted to formal contexts such as church, whereas all daily interactions happened either in dialect or in Portuguese, from which the required words for innovations were also taken.

Speakers of Hunsrik are typically bilingual with Portuguese, but are not necessarily familiar with Standard German. The elementary school of Santa Maria do Herval, a municipality in Rio Grande do Sul with a population of roughly 6,000, teaches Hunsrik and uses a new orthography for this which is closer to Portuguese than to Standard German conventions, this follows a research by SIL International and led by professor Ursula Wiesemann to standardize the language according to its actual use in the local communities and social networks. This method is also used for teaching on other local municipalities with native Hunsrik speakers. A concurrent standardization approach led by the professor Cléo Altenhofen criticizes this detachment, demanding a closer orthographic tie between Hunsrik and Standard German, and arguing that the efforts should try to revert the Portuguese influence over the language by keeping a very conservative orthography, in a way that it would be only a variation of the original Hunsrückisch dialect.

In July 2018, the mayor of Blumenau, Mario Hildebrandt, signed Decree no. 11,850/2018, which created the Bilingual Erich Klabunde Municipal School, offering teaching in Portuguese and German.

Co-official status

- Rio Grande do Sul
  - Barão
  - Harmonia
  - Horizontina
  - Ijuí
  - Santa Maria do Herval
- Santa Catarina
  - Antônio Carlos
  - Ipumirim

== East Pomeranian ==
East Pomeranian, a dialect of the Low German language, is spoken in many places in southeastern and southern Brazil:

- Projeto de Educação Escolar Pomerana, founded 2004 by teachers and five municipalities in Espírito Santo (Santa Maria de Jetibá, Laranja da Terra, Vila Pavão, Domingos Martins, Pancas). Education in (Brazilian?) East Pomeranian.
- Spoken in Rondônia since 1970.
- In Santa Leopoldina, first European settlement in Espírito Santo, the descendants of immigrants from Switzerland and Luxembourg now speak East Pomeranian.
- Santa Maria de Jetibá (previously part of Santa Leopoldina) is Brazil's center of Pommeranian culture with 90% (ethnic?) Pommeranians.

Municipalities where East Pomeranian dialects are co-official in Espírito Santo, Brazil

Co-official status

- Espírito Santo
  - Afonso Cláudio (in the district of Mata Fria)
  - Domingos Martins
  - Itarana
  - Laranja da Terra
  - Pancas
  - Santa Maria de Jetibá
  - Vila Pavão
- Santa Catarina
  - Pomerode
- Rio Grande do Sul
  - Canguçu
- Rondônia
  - Espigão d'Oeste
- Minas Gerais
  - Itueta

== Other German and Low Saxon/Low German dialects in Brazil ==
- Plautdietsch, spoken by Mennonites from the former Soviet Union (since the 1930s).
- Tyrol Austro-Bavarian dialect and Vorarlberg Alemannic in Treze Tílias (since 1933).
- Danube Swabian in Guarapuava (since 1951).
- Paraná-Wolga-Deutsch
- Vestfaliano

=== Plattdüütsch or Vestfaliano ===
Plattdüütsch, or Vestfaliano is a variation of the Westphalian language or Westfalisch, one of the major dialect groups of West Low German. This spoken dialect has legal and co-official status in the municipality of Westfália, according to the lei N° 1302 of 2016 This dialect variety was brought by immigrants coming from Westphalia establishing communities and language island in Rio Grande do Sul and Santa Catarina.

== See also ==
- List of territorial entities where German is an official language
- Geographical distribution of German speakers
- Languages of Brazil
- German Brazilians
