= Languages of South America =

Common spoken languages in South America

Official languages in South America

The languages of South America can be divided into three broad groups:

- the languages of the (in most cases, former) colonial powers, primarily Spanish and Portuguese;
- many indigenous languages, some of which are co-official alongside the colonial languages;
- and various pockets of other languages spoken by immigrant populations.

== Main languages ==
Spanish is the most spoken language in the Americas, but Portuguese is the most spoken language in the continent of South America, with Spanish as a close second in South America.

Other official languages with substantial number of speakers are:

- Aymara in Bolivia and Peru
- Guaraní in Bolivia and Paraguay
- Quechua in Bolivia, Ecuador, and Peru

Language	Speakers	Countries	Source
Portuguese	215,754,600	Brazil, Argentina, Paraguay, Uruguay, Venezuela	
Spanish	214,265,000	Argentina, Bolivia, Chile, Colombia, Ecuador, Paraguay, Peru, Uruguay, Venezuela, Brazil	
Quechua	7,735,620	Bolivia, Ecuador, Peru, Argentina, Chile, Colombia	
English	6,925,850	Falkland Islands, Guyana, Colombia (San Andres y Providencia)	
Guarani	6,162,790	Bolivia, Paraguay, Argentina, Brazil	
Hunsrik	3,000,000	Brazil, Argentina, Paraguay	
Aymara	1,677,100	Bolivia, Peru, Chile	
German	1,285,800	Argentina, Bolivia, Brazil, Chile, Paraguay, Peru, Uruguay	
Italian	1,259,900	Argentina, Brazil, Uruguay, Venezuela	
Dutch	575,000	Suriname	
Japanese	425,000	Brazil	
Wayuu	416,000	Colombia, Venezuela	
French	319,400	French Guiana, Brazil (Amapá)	
Sranan Tongo	307,600	Suriname, French Guiana	
Pomeranian	300,000	Brazil	
Mapudungun	258,410	Argentina, Chile	
Hindustani	164,000	Guyana, Suriname, French Guiana	
Surinamese-Javanese	60,000	Suriname, French Guiana	

== Indigenous languages ==
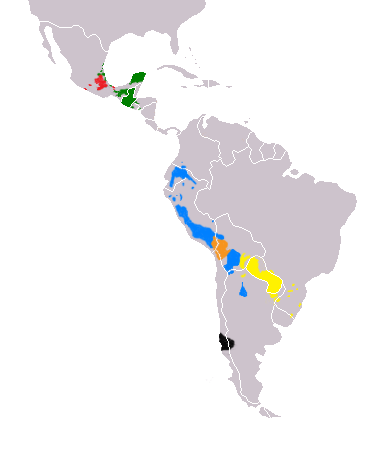
Main native languages in Latin America, legend: Quechua / Guarani / Aymara; Nahuatl / Mayan languages / Mapudungun

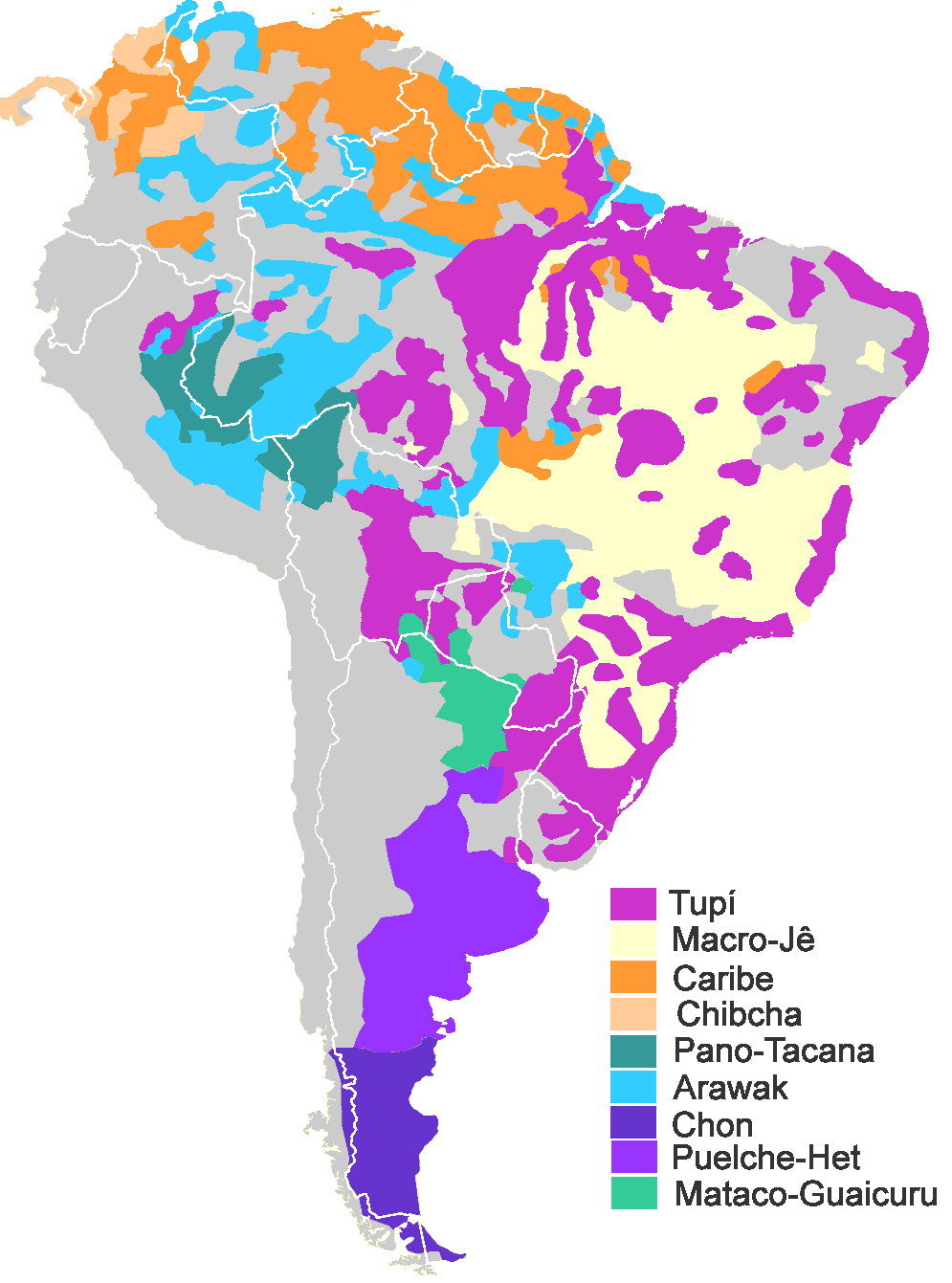
Main language families of South America (other than Aimaran, Mapudungun, and Quechuan, which expanded after the Spanish conquest).

Indigenous languages of South America include, among several others, the Quechua languages in Bolivia, Ecuador, and Peru and to a lesser extent in Argentina, Chile, and Colombia; Guaraní in Paraguay and to a much lesser extent in Argentina and Bolivia; Aymara in Bolivia and Peru and to a lesser extent in Chile; Wayuu in northern Colombia and northwest Venezuela; and Mapudungun in small pockets of southern Chile and Argentina.

In Bolivia, three languages—Quechua, Aymara, and Tupi Guarani—are co-official alongside Spanish. In Paraguay, Guarani shares joint official status with Spanish. In Colombia, the languages of the country's ethnic groups are constitutionally recognized as official languages in their territories; more than 60 such aboriginal languages exist today. Ecuador uses Spanish, Northern Quechua, and Shuar as official languages for intercultural relations. In Peru, Quechua and Aymara, as well as other indigenous languages, are co-official in the areas where they are predominant. There are many other languages once spoken in South America that are extinct today (such as the extinct languages of the Marañón River basin).

In Brazil, there are around 135 indigenous languages confirmed. The regions with the most speakers are North and Central-West Brazil, where there is a larger concentration of native people. Indigenous populations have been trying to keep their traditions of their homeland, with the help of Funai, the agency responsible for the protection of the native people.

Rapa Nui is a Polynesian language spoken on Easter Island, Chile.

Language	Speakers	Countries	Source
Quechua	7,735,620	Bolivia, Ecuador, Peru, Argentina, Chile, Colombia	
Guarani	6,162,790	Bolivia, Paraguay, Argentina, Brazil	
Aymara	1,677,100	Bolivia, Peru, Chile	
Wayuu	416,000	Colombia, Venezuela	
Mapudungun	258,410	Argentina, Chile	

=== Classification ===
- Macro-Chibchan
  - Chibchan
    - Chibcha-Duit, Tunebo, Arhuaco, Cuna-Cueva, Guaymi-Dorasque, Talamanca, Rama-Guatuso
    - Misumalpan, Paya, Xinca, Lenca
    - Shiriana
  - Paezan
    - Choco, Cuaiquer, Andaki, Paez-Coconuco, Colorado-Cayapa, Warrau, Mura-Matanawi, Jirajira, Yunca, Atacameno, Itonama
- Andean-Equatorial
  - Andean
    - Selkʼnam, Yahgan, Alacaluf, Tehuelche, Puelche, Araucanian
    - Quechua, Aymara
    - Zaparoan
      - Omurano, Cabela
    - Cahuapana
    - Leco, Sec, Culle, Xibito-Cholon, Catacao, Colan
    - Simacu
  - Jibaro-Kandoshi, Esmeralda, Cofan, Yaruro
  - Macro-Tucanoan
    - Tucano
      - Auixira
    - Catuquina, Ticuna, Muniche, Auaque, Caliana, Máku, Yuri, Canichana, Mobima
    - Puinave
  - Equatorial
    - Arawak
      - Chapacura-Uanhaman, Chamicuro, Apolista, Amuesha, Araua, Uru
    - Tupi
      - Ariqueme
    - Timote, Cariri, Zamuco, Guahibo-Pamigua, Saliban, Otomaco-Taparita, Mocoa, Tuyuneri, Yuruneri, Trumai, Cayuvava
- Ge-Pano-Carib
  - Macro-Gê
    - Ge, Caingang, Camacan, Machacali, Puri, Pataxo, Malali, Coropo, Botocudo, Chiquita, Guato, Fulnio, Oti
    - Bororo
    - Caraja
  - Macro-Panoan
    - Tacana-Pano, Moseten, Mataco, Lule, Vilela, Mascoy, Charrua, Guaycuru-Opaie

== Other non-indigenous languages ==
Municipalities in which Talian is co-official in Rio Grande do Sul, Brazil, highlighted in red: Bento Gonçalves, Caxias do Sul, Flores da Cunha, Nova Roma do Sul, and Serafina Corrêa.

Municipalities in which East Pomeranian dialect is co-official in Espírito Santo, Brazil: Domingos Martins, Itarana, Laranja da Terra, Pancas, Santa Maria de Jetibá, and Vila Pavão.

In Brazil, Italian and German dialects, specifically Talian, East Pomeranian, and Hunsrik, have co-official status alongside Portuguese in about a dozen cities and are mandatory subjects in schools in other municipalities. The states of Santa Catarina and Rio Grande do Sul have Talian officially approved as a heritage language in these states, and Espírito Santo has the East Pomeranian dialect, along with the German language as cultural heritage.

English is an official language in Guyana, and its creole form is the country's most widely spoken language. English is also the official language in the territories of the Falkland Islands (Spanish: Islas Malvinas) and South Georgia and the South Sandwich Islands.

French is the official language in French Guiana, an overseas region of France. Dutch is the official language in neighboring Suriname.

Italian is spoken by communities in Argentina, Uruguay, Venezuela, and Brazil.

German is used by some in Brazil, Paraguay, Chile, Ecuador, Uruguay, Venezuela, and Colombia.

Welsh is spoken and written in the historic towns of Trelew and Rawson in Argentine Patagonia.

There are also small clusters of Japanese speakers in Brazil, Peru, and Bolivia (including Okinawans from the island of Okinawa). Brazil currently holds the largest Japanese community outside Japan.

Caribbean Hindustani is spoken by the Indo-Guyanese and the Indo-Surinamese. In Suriname, the language is known as Sarnámi Hindustáni and is still widely spoken. However, in Guyana, where it is known as Guyanese Hindustani or Aili Gaili, the language is nearly extinct as a spoken language, with only words and phrases still remaining.

Surinamese-Javanese is spoken by the Javanese Surinamese who form about 14% of the Suriname's population.

Sranan Tongo, an English-based creole, serves as one of the lingua francas of Suriname, alongside Dutch.

Other non-indigenous languages spoken include Arabic, Chinese, Romani, Haitian Creole, Romanian, Greek, Polish, Ukrainian, and Russian.

== See also ==
- Languages in censuses
- Indigenous languages of South America
- List of unclassified languages of South America
- List of extinct languages of South America
- Extinct languages of the Marañón River basin
