= Afonso Cláudio, Espírito Santo =

Afonso Cláudio
- Municipality
- Municipality of Afonso Cláudio
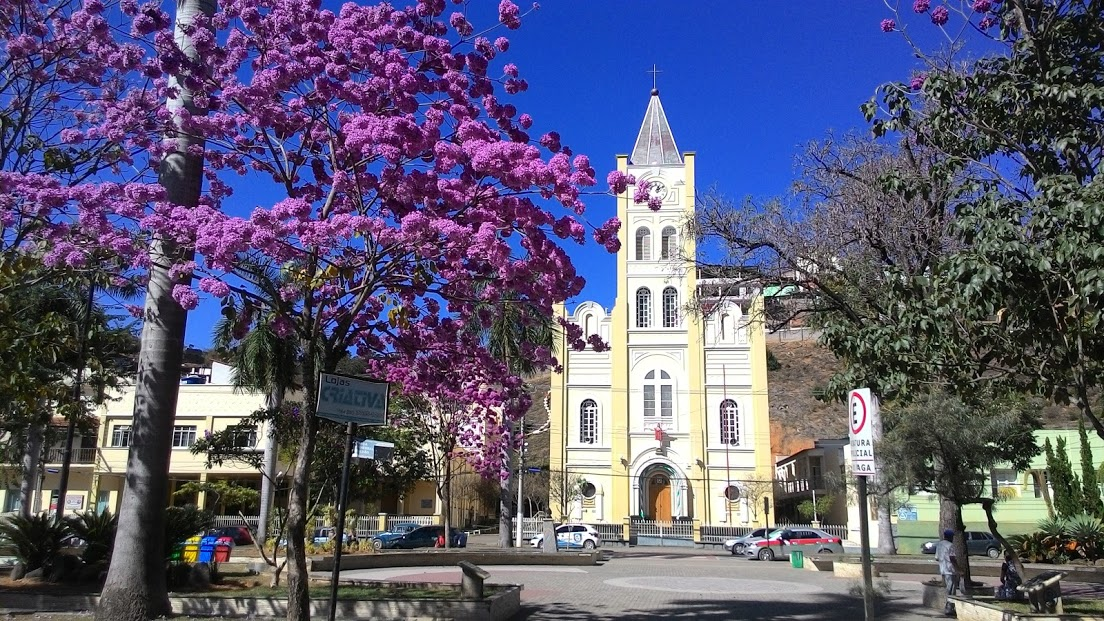

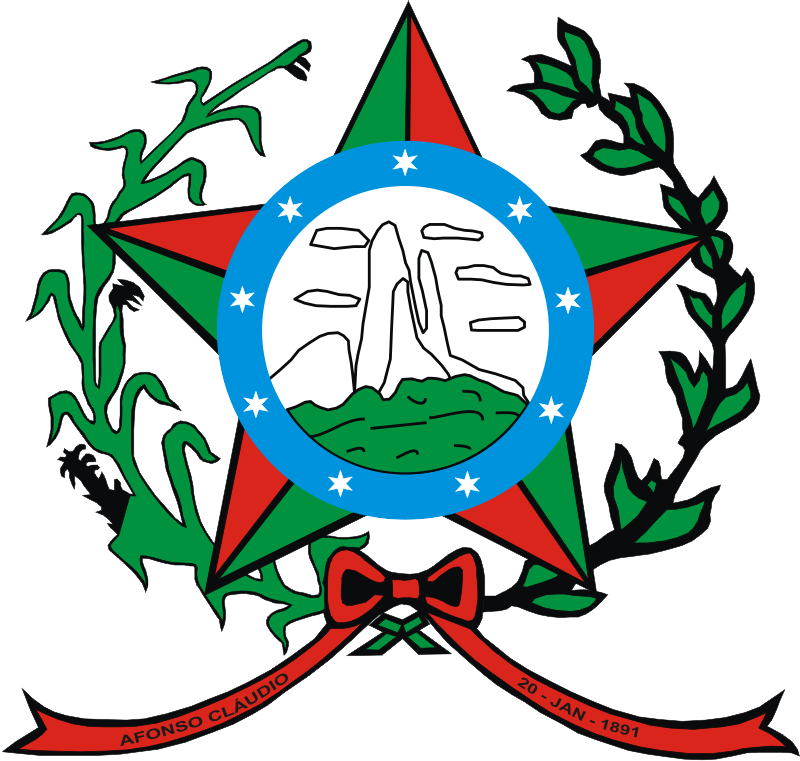
- Flag Coat of arms

- Location in Espírito Santo
- Coordinates: 20°4′26″S 41°7′26″W
- Country: Brazil
- Region: Southeast
- State: Espírito Santo
- Founded: 20 November 1890

Government
  - Mayor: Luciano Roncetti Pimenta (UNIÃO)

Area
  - Total: 941.188 km^{2} (363.395 sq mi)
- Elevation: 380 m (1,250 ft)

Population (2022)
  - Total: 30,684
  - Density: 32.601/km^{2} (84.437/sq mi)
- Demonym: afonso-claudense
- Time zone: UTC−3 (BRT)
- Postal Code: 29600-000 to 29614-999
- Area code: +55 27
- HDI (2010): 0.667 – medium
- Website: afonsoclaudio.es.gov.br/site

Afonso Cláudio is a municipality in east central Espírito Santo, Brazil, founded in 1963. The town, at a height of 610m above sea level, has a population of approximately 30,455 and an area of 361.7 km^{2}, and a population density of 32.53 inhabitants/km^{2}. Its borders include: (E) Domingos Martins, Santa Maria de Jetibá and Itarana (N) Laranja da Terra and the neighbouring state of Minas Gerais, (W) Brejetuba (S) Conceição do Castelo and Venda Nova do Imigrante.

== History ==
Afonso Cláudio first began to be populated in 1885, when Valentim Perozzini, an Italian immigrant, moved there. Now that place is called São Luis de Miranda. The mainly Italian immigration which took place in this area was indirect, in that people usually first came from the neighbouring localities of Alfredo Chaves, Castelo and Itaguaçu. The name of the municipality was given in honour of Afonso Cláudio de Freitas Rosa (born in Santa Leopoldina, Espírito Santo), the first governor of that state after the implantation of the Brazilian Republic on November 15, 1889.

== Geography ==
=== Climate ===
Afonso Cláudio

Climate chart (precipitation, max. and min. temperature)
J	F	M	A	M	J	J	A	S	O	N	D
173 30 19	94 31 19	123 31 19	81 29 17	57 27 15	26 27 13	33 26 13	34 27 14	61 27 15	121 28 17	186 29 18	204 29 19
- █ Average max. and min. temperatures in °C
- █ Precipitation totals in mm
Imperial conversion
J	F	M	A	M	J	J	A	S	O	N	D
6.8 86 66	3.7 87 66	4.8 87 66	3.2 84 63	2.2 81 59	1 80 55	1.3 78 55	1.3 80 56	2.4 81 59	4.8 82 63	7.3 83 65	8 84 65
- █ Average max. and min. temperatures in °F
- █ Precipitation totals in inches
