= East Pomeranian dialect =

Low German dialect

East Pomeranian
- Native to: Diaspora of German expellees in the Americas; formerly Province of Pomerania
- Native speakers: Native: ≅ 300.000
- Language family: Indo-European: Germanic; West Germanic; North Sea Germanic; Low German; East Low German; East Pomeranian
- Writing system: Latin (German alphabet)

Official status
- Official language in: Brazil (11 municipalities)
- Recognised minority language in: United States; Poland

Language codes
- ISO 639-2: nds for Low German
- ISO 639-3: nds for Low German
- Glottolog: east2293

East Pomeranian (Ostpommersch), Farther Pomeranian (Hinterpommersch) or just Pomeranian (Pomerisch) is an East Low German dialect moribund in Europe, which used to be spoken in the region of Farther Pomerania when it was part of the German Province of Pomerania, until World War II, and today is part of Poland. Currently, the language survives mainly in Brazil, where it is spoken by descendants of German immigrants of the 19th century and where it was given its own orthography by the linguist Ismael Tressmann. It has co-official status in 11 Brazilian municipalities and has been recognized as a historical and cultural heritage of the Brazilian state of Espírito Santo.

Nowadays, spoken East Pomeranian in Brazil has mostly been influenced by Portuguese language and Hunsrik, a German dialect derived from the Hunsrückisch native to Brazil. It excludes the dialect spoken in the United States, known as Wisconsin Pomeranian, which was influenced by the English language. East Pomeranian was also reported to have been spoken in Australia.

East Pomeranian brought to the United States was spoken in central Wisconsin, Upstate New York, and parts of Iowa. The number of speakers of Wisconsin Pomeranian has decreased significantly and the dialect is moribund, now primarily spoken between Lincoln and Marathon counties in Wisconsin. It estimated that there are less than 500 speakers, who are all over the age of 60.

== European Pomeranian ==
East Pomeranian is a Low Saxon language that originated from medieval German settlement in Pomerania. In Farther Pomerania, Low Saxon and Westphalian Germans settled along the coast while the highlands of Farther Pomerania were settled by Brandenburgians. West Frisians and Mennonites later settled in the region as well, speaking related languages. After World War II, virtually all of the East Pomeranian speaking Germans were expelled from Pomerania, making it extinct in its former range.

The five dialects of East Pomeranian in Europe were:

- Central Pomeranian, which was formerly spoken from between the Wipper and Stolpe Rivers to the eastern edge of the Northeastern dialect area. Out of the other dialects it covered the largest area with a subdialect of Central Pomeranian extending from Swinemünde to Treptow an der Rega, while another was spoken along the coast in Kolberg, Köslin, and Belgard an der Persante. Inland, the cities of Naugard, Regenwalde, Schivelbein, and Neustettin were within the Central dialect area. Brazilian Pomeranian predominantly exhibits features of Central Pomeranian.
- Southern Pomeranian, which was formerly spoken in the former districts of Saatzig and Dramburg.
- Southeastern Pomeranian, spoken around Bublitz and north of Neustettin.
- Northeastern Pomeranian, spoken around Schlawe, Stolp, Rummelsburg, Bütow, Leba and Lauenburg. Wisconsin Pomeranian was close to the Northeastern dialect with influence from the Central dialect.
- Belbucker, which consisted of dialects spoken around Belbuck Abbey, centered in the Greifenburg district. These dialects were related to the ones spoken around Dramburg.

The dialects have also been described as:

- West Prussian ( Westpreußisch), spoken in West Prussia.
- Eastern Further Pomeranian (Osthinterpommersch), spoken in eastern Farther Pomerania
- Western Further Pomeranian (Westhinterpommersch), spoken in western Farther Pomerania.
- Bublitzisch, spoken in Bublitz.
- Pomerelian (Pommerellisch), spoken in the Pomerelia region.

Further east, there was a Low Prussian-East Pomeranian transitional dialect (Übergangsmundart zum Ostpommerschen) that was not intelligible with Pomeranian. The transition zone ended approximately at Chojnice.

== Brazilian Pomeranian ==
Pomeranian language sample
Audio recording of a native Pomeranian speaker from Espírito Santo, Brazil, recorded in 1983.

Municipalities in which the East Pomeranian dialect has co-official status in Espírito Santo, Brazil.

Whereas Pomeranian has become moribund in Europe and the United States, it is still actively spoken and taught in Brazil. The Pomeranian School Education Program (PROEPO) was set up in 2008 by Ismael Tressmann and promotes the language throughout Espírito Santo and trains teachers on Pomeranian language instruction.

=== Espírito Santo ===
- Afonso Cláudio (in the district of Mata Fria)
- Domingos Martins
- Itarana
- Laranja da Terra
- Pancas
- Santa Maria de Jetibá
- Vila Pavão

=== Minas Gerais ===
- Itueta

=== Santa Catarina ===
- Pomerode

=== Rio Grande do Sul ===
- Canguçu
- São Lourenço do Sul (under approval)

=== Rondônia ===
- Espigão d'Oeste

== Grammar ==
Verbs

Conjugation patterns of Brazilian Pomeranian

verbs				breeka, to break"	häwa, "to have"	wila, "to want/ to become"	måka, "to make"	bruuka, "to need"	raupa, "to call/ to shout"	srijga "to scream"
Infinitive				breeka	häwa	wila	måka	bruuka	raupa	srijga
Participle	Past			brooka	hat	wud	måkt	bruukt	roopa	sreega
Indicative	Present	Singular	1st person	breek	häw	wil	måk	bruuk	raup	srijg
Indicative	Present	Singular	2nd person	breekst	häst	wist	mökst	bruukst	raupst	srigst
Indicative	Present	Singular	3rd person	breekt	hät	wil	mök	bruukt	raupt	srijgt
Indicative	Present	Plural		breeka	häwa	wila	måka	bruuka	raupa	srijga
Indicative	Past	Singular	1st person	braik	haar	wu	maik	brüükt	raip	sreig
Indicative	Past	Singular	2nd person	braikst	haast	wust	maikst	brüükst	raipst	sreigst
Indicative	Past	Singular	3rd Person	braik	haar	wu	maik	brüükt	raip	sreigt
Indicative	Past	Plural		braika	haara	wula	maika	brüüka	raipa	sreiga

== Phonology ==
=== Vowels ===
	Front				Central		Back	
	Unrounded		Rounded		Central		Back	
	short	long	short	long	short	long	short	long
Close	ɪ	iˑ	ʏ	yˑ			ʊ	uˑ
Mid					ə			
Open-mid	ɛ	ɛː ɛˑ	œ		(ɐ)		ɔ ɔˑ	
Open						aː	ɑ	

=== Diphthongs ===
	Ending point	
	Front	Back
Near-close	ui̯	
Mid	ei̯ oi̯ ø:i̯	ou̯
Open	ɑi̯	ɑu̯

=== Consonants ===
		Labial	Alveolar	Post- alveolar	Palatal	Velar/ Uvular	Glottal
Nasal		m	n			ŋ	
Plosive	Fortis	p	t			k	(ʔ)
Plosive	Lenis	b	d			ɡ	
Affricate	Fortis		(ts)	(tʃ)			
Affricate	Lenis			(dʒ)			
Fricative	Fortis	f	s	ʃ	(ç) (ʝ)	(x) (ɣ)	h (ɦ)
Fricative	Lenis	v	z	(ʒ)			
Approximant		(β)	l		(ʎ) j	(w)	
Rhotic			r				

== See also ==
- Brazilian German
