= Viana, Espírito Santo =

Viana
- Municipality
- Municipality of Viana
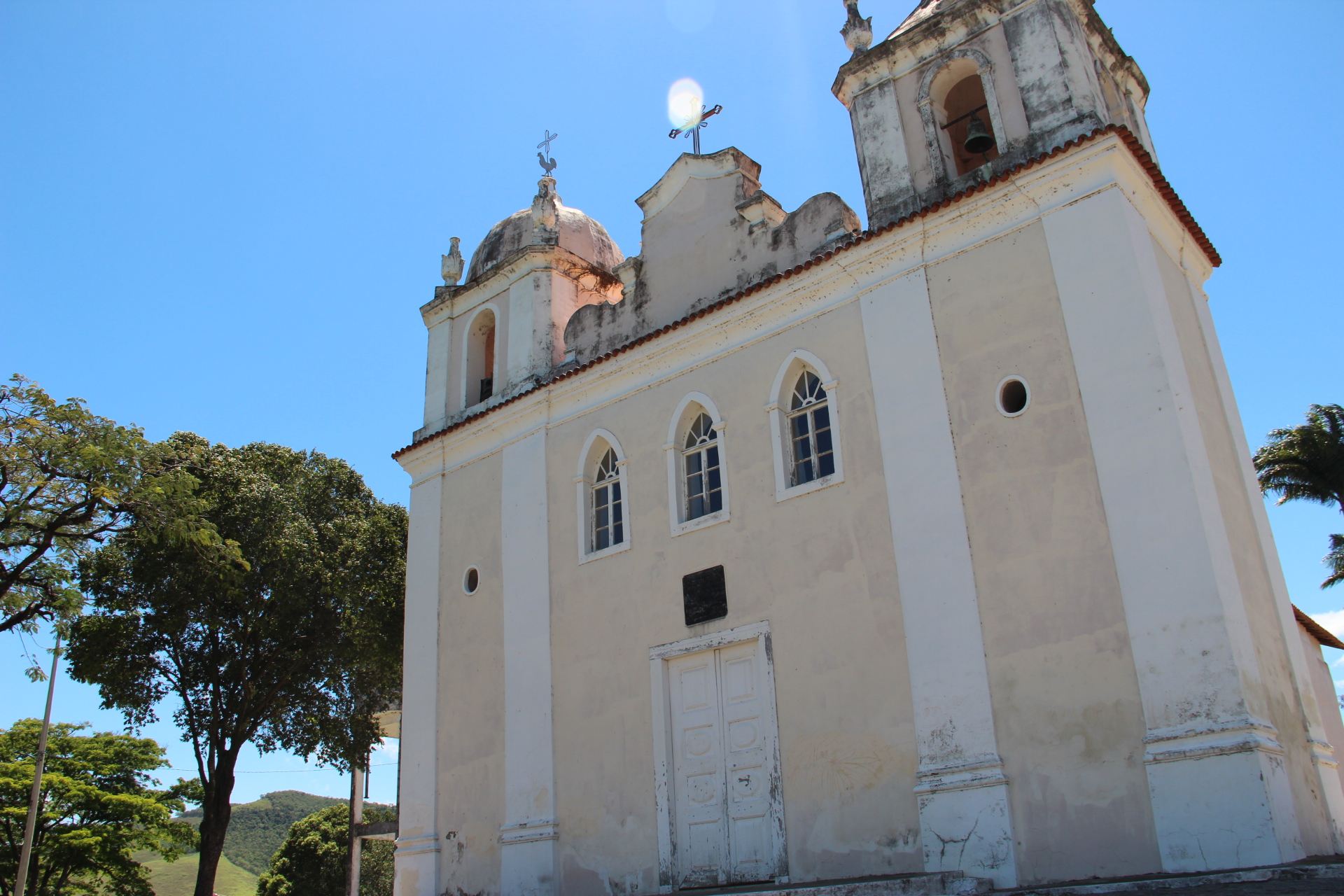

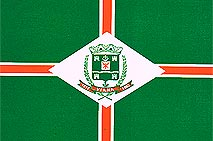
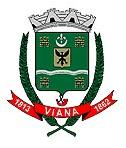
- Flag Coat of arms
- Nickname: Princesinha do Rio Solimões ( Princess of the Solimões River )
- Motto: Desenvolvimento para todos ( Development for all )
- Location in Espírito Santo

- Location in Brazil
- Coordinates: 20°23′24″S 40°21′45″W
- Country: Brazil
- Mesoregion: Central Espírito-Santense
- State: Espírito Santo
- Founded: July 23, 1862

Government
  - Mayor: Wanderson Bueno (PODE)

Area
  - Total: 311.608 km^{2} (120.313 sq mi)
- Elevation: 34 m (112 ft)

Population (2020)
  - Total: 79,500
  - Density: 255/km^{2} (661/sq mi)
- Time zone: UTC−3 (BRT)
- HDI (2010): 0.686 – medium
- Website: viana.es.gov.br

Viana is a municipality in the state of Espírito Santo, Brazil. It is located 18 km southwest of Vitória on the road to Minas Gerais. Its population was 79,500 (2020) and its area is 312 km^{2}. Though it is part of the Greater Vitória metropolitan area, it still maintains a much more laid-back feeling. Marked by its first church dedicated to Nossa Senhora da Conceição (built on March 22, 1817) atop a little mound in the middle of the town all those who pass it on their way to and from Minas Gerais appreciate its imposing landmark. The town also has a railway museum at the railway station inaugurated on 13 July 1895 by the English. The municipality borders Vitória (E), Cariacica (N), Domingos Martins (W) and Guarapari (S).

== History ==
In 1846, 39 families from North Rhine-Westphalia and Rhineland-Palatinate (then known as Rheinpreussen in German, or Prússia Renana in Portuguese) arrived at Vitória on 21 December to settle what is now Viana, as this was the first allotted land they received from the government. In 1857, though, most of them moved on to found Santa Isabel Colony on 27 January 1857.

In the 1890s, Viana was a prosperous colony of mainly Azorean immigrants. In 1891 Santa Isabel became a municipality independent from Viana in what used to be its mountainous region. In 1961, the city was made the seat of the Roman Catholic Diocese of Viana.
