= Isabel, Domingos Martins =

District of Domingos Martins

Coordinates: 20°22′55″S 40°37′19″W

Isabel is a district of the municipality of Domingos Martins, state of Espírito Santo, Brazil. Situated 3 km from the capital of that municipality, of same name.

== History ==
The area, first known as Santa Isabel Colony, was the first centre for colonization started under the auspices of Luiz Pereira do Couto Ferraz, then president of the province of Espírito Santo (now state). As part of this program the first 39 families from North Rhine-Westphalia and Rhineland-Palatinate (then known as Rheinpreussen in German or Prússia Renana in Portuguese, today those names are only historical), arrived to Vitória on the 21 of December 1846, first they settled in Viana but in 1857 most families followed on to found Santa Isabel Colony on 27 January 1857.

The first church built in Santa Isabel is from the 1850s. In 1859 more German families arrived to the area, and also the first Italian immigrants. The colony separated from Viana on 16 October 1917.
