= Domingos Martins =

- Municipality
- Municipality of Domingos Martins
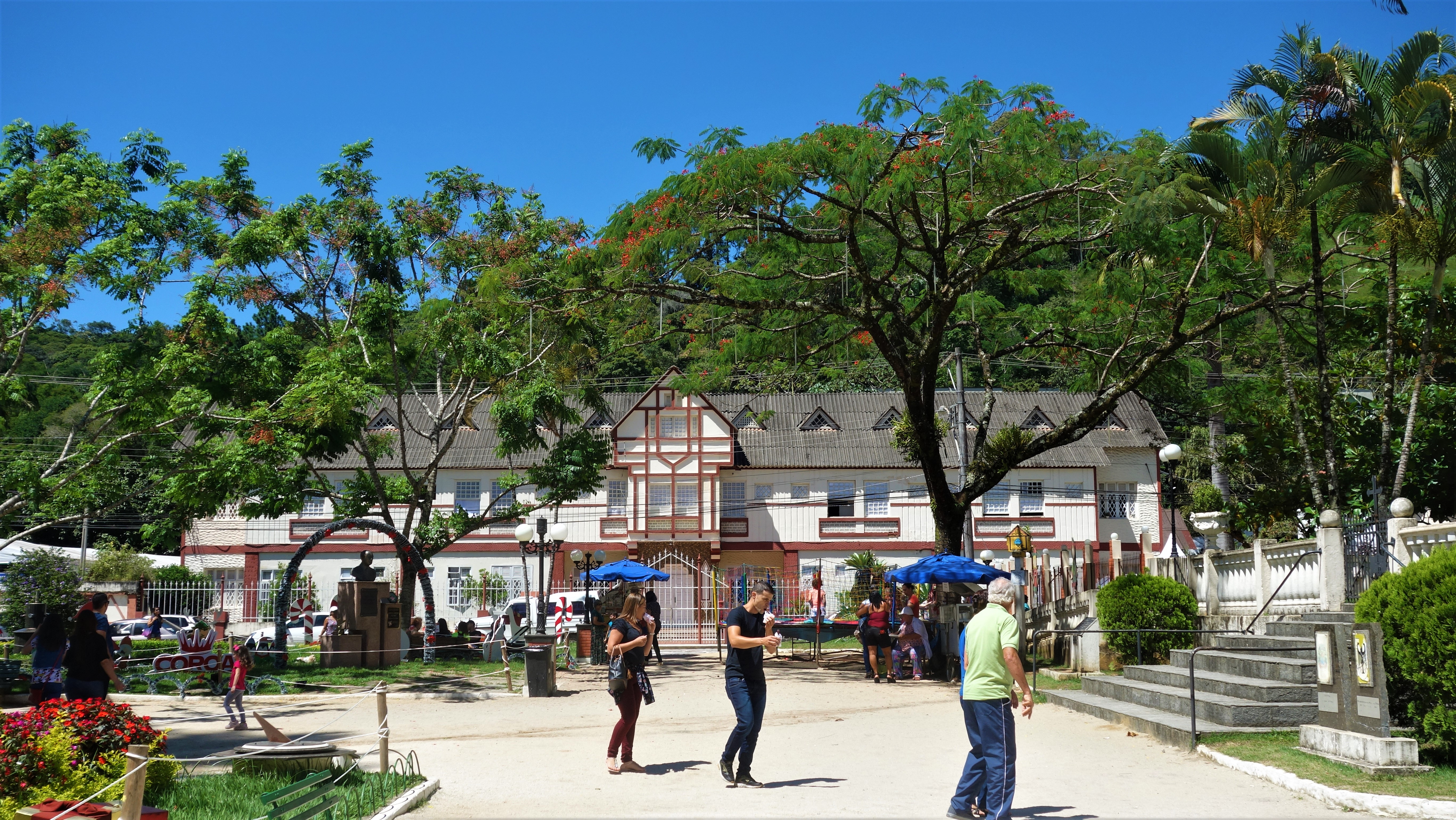
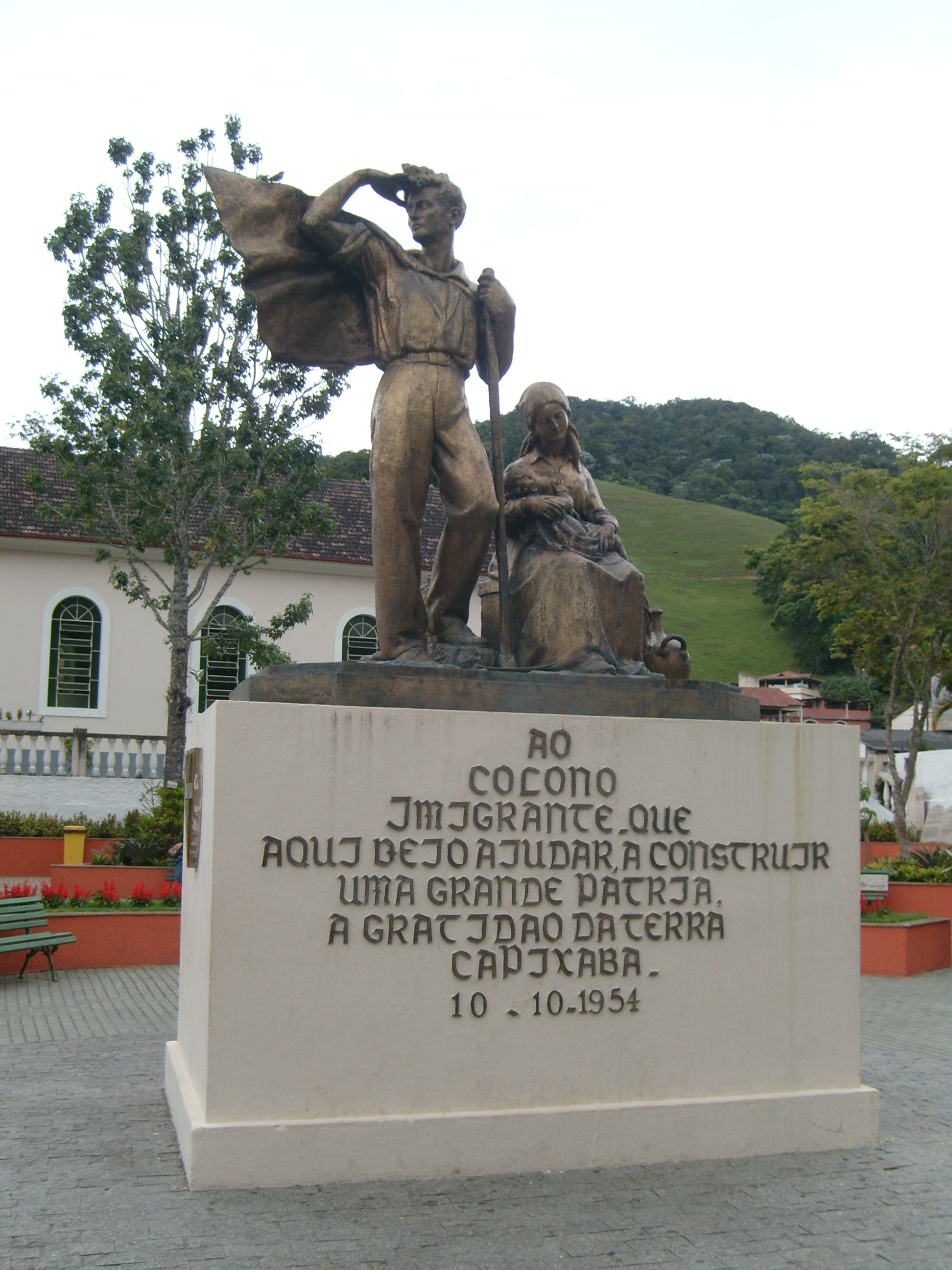
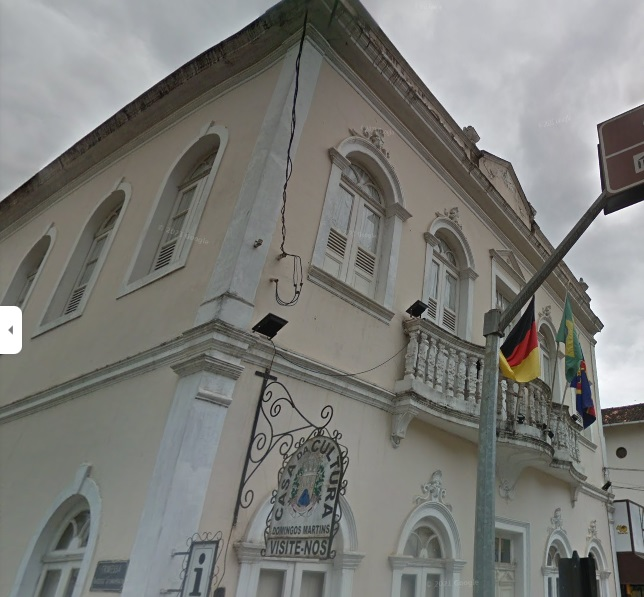
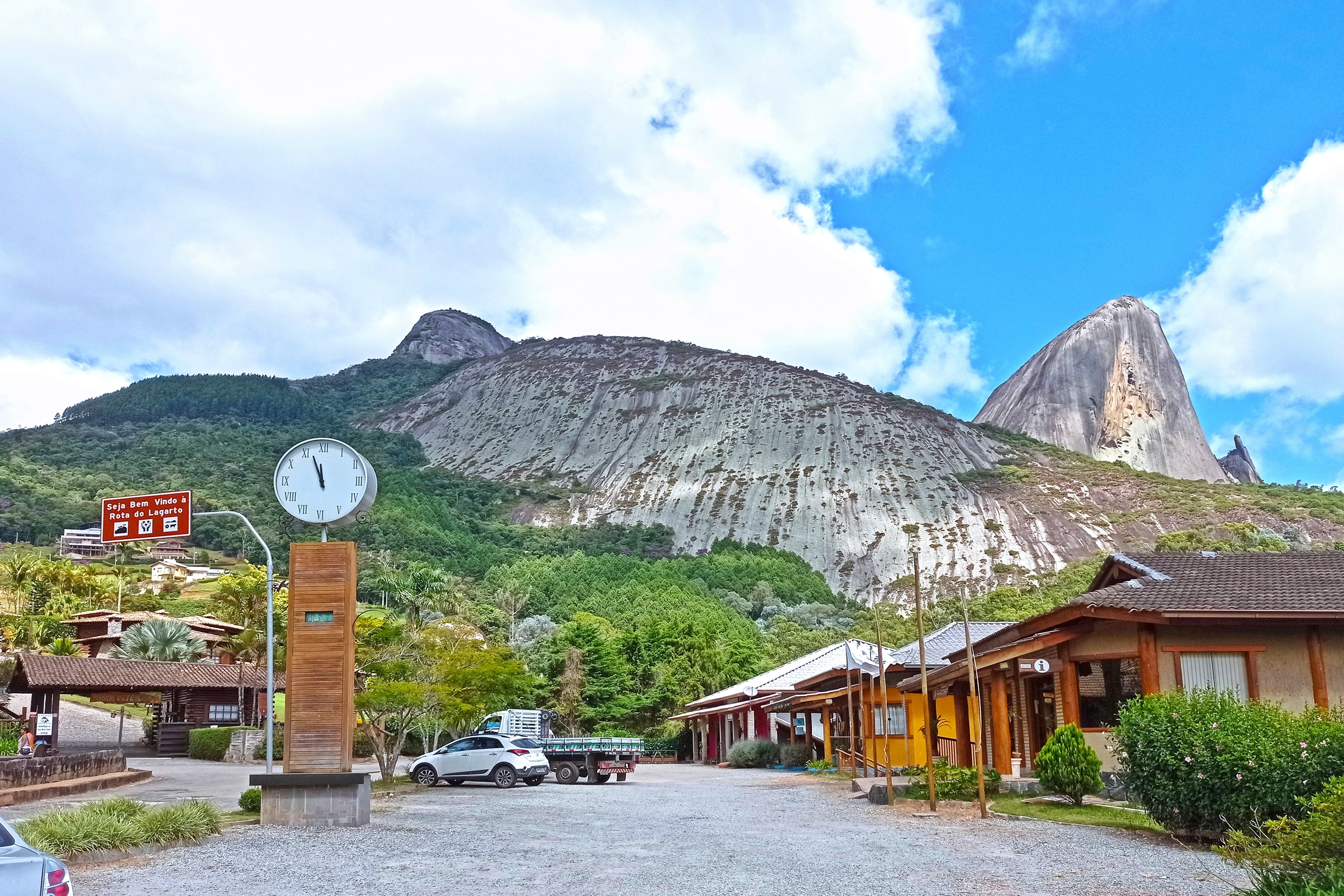
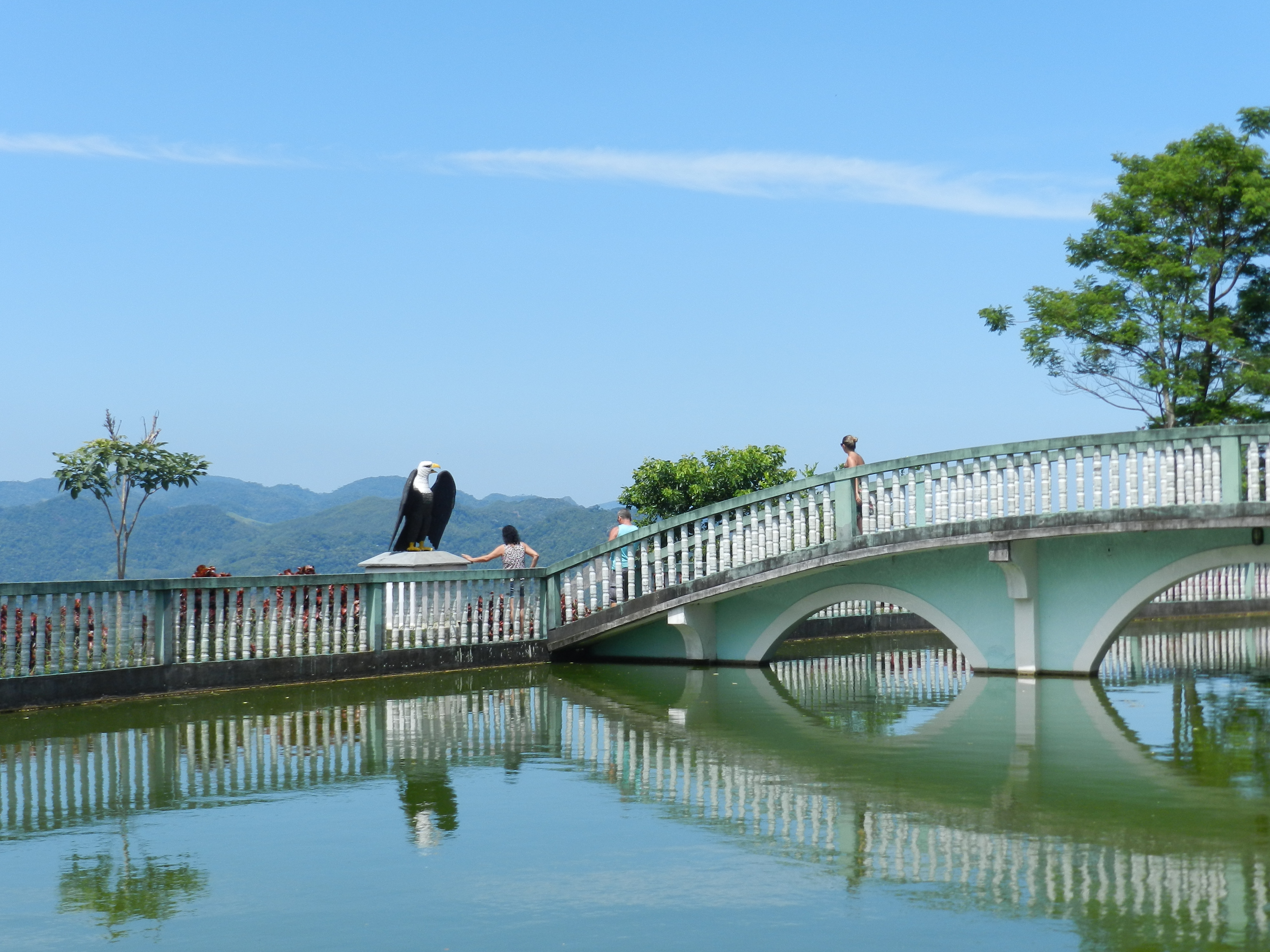
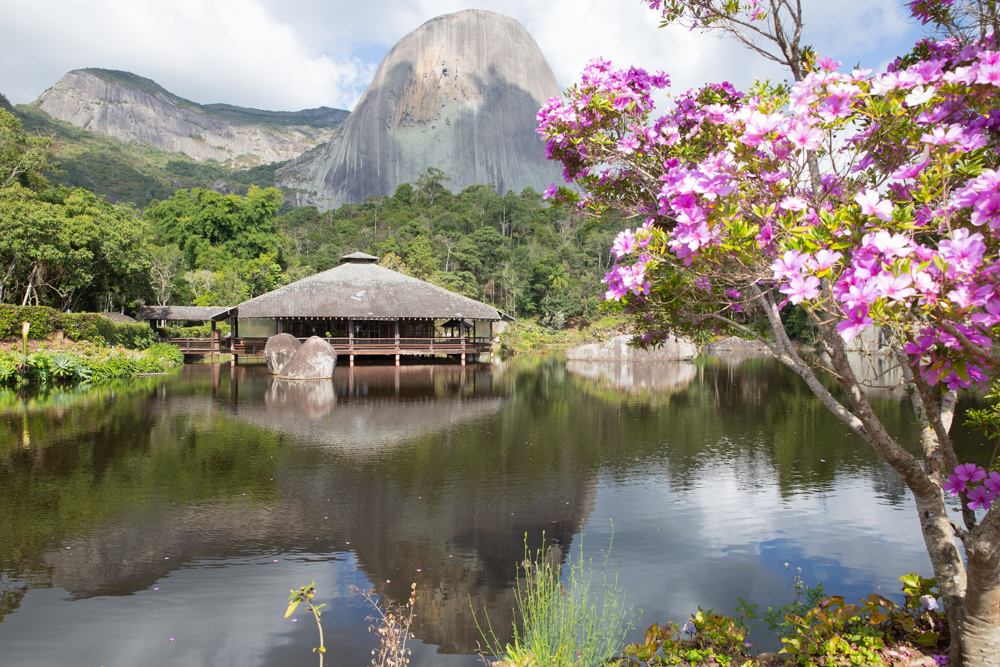
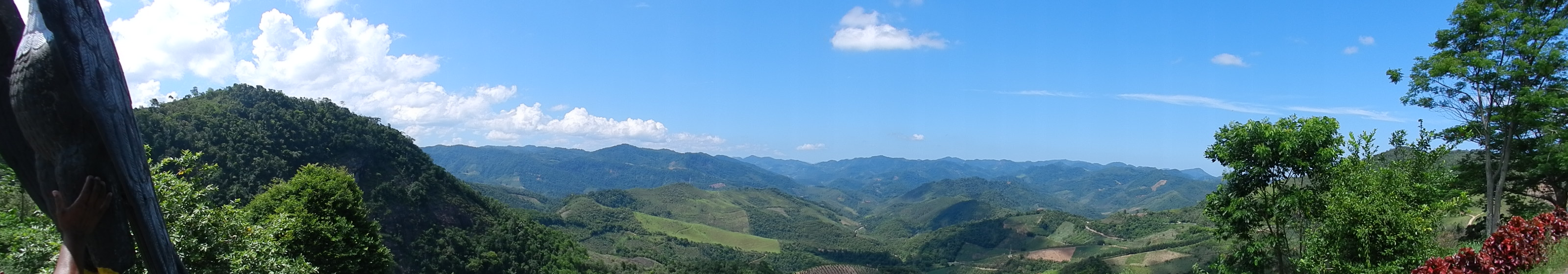

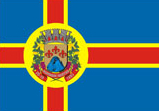
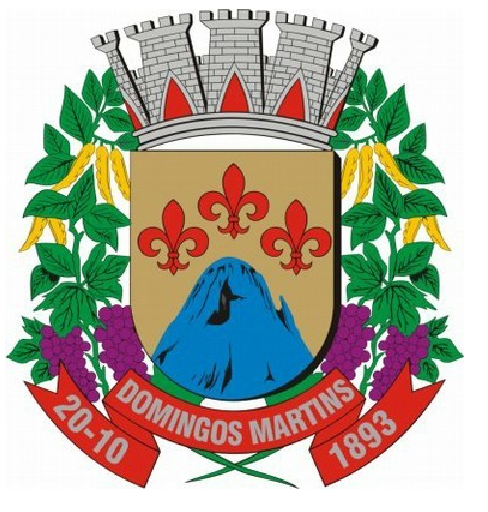
- Flag Coat of arms

- Location in Espírito Santo

- Location within Brazil
- Coordinates: 20°21′46″S 40°39′32″W
- Country: Brazil
- Region: Southeast
- State: Espírito Santo
- Founded: 20 October 1876

Government
  - Mayor: Wanzete Kruger (PSB)

Area
  - Total: 1,225.327 km^{2} (473.101 sq mi)
- Elevation: 542 m (1,778 ft)

Population (2020)
  - Total: 33,986
  - Density: 26.4/km^{2} (68/sq mi)
- Time zone: UTC−3 (BRT)
- HDI (2010): 0.669 – medium
- Website: domingosmartins.es.gov.br

Domingos Martins is the name of a municipality in the Brazilian state of Espírito Santo. According to the IBGE, the municipality had 33,986 inhabitants. It has a population density of 25.9 inhabitants/km^{2}.

== Geography ==
Domingos Martins is approximately 60 km west of the state capital, Vitória, and is 542 meters above sea level. Bordering municipalities include Castelo, Venda Nova do Imigrante and Afonso Claudio to the west, Santa Maria de Jetiba and Santa Leopoldina to the north, Cariacica and Viana to the east, and Guarapari, Marechal Floriano, Alfredo Chaves and Vargem Alta to the south. The municipality itself is again subdivided into 5 districts (distritos): Capital (Sede in Portuguese), Aracê, Santa Isabel, Parajú and Melgaço. The total area occupied by the municipality is 1,225.327 km^{2}.

It is in the mountainous region of the state and is marketed as the "Green City", since it is surrounded by subtropical rainforest, much of which has disappeared in the rest of the region. Within its borders lie mountains of up to 2000m, amongst which is the well-known Pedra Azul State Park consisting mainly of a quartzite rock jutting out of the surrounding landscape at 1,822m above sea level. It has a blue tinge to the stone due to the kind of lichens which grow on it, which gives the name to the formation and the park.

== History ==
This town was founded in 1893 and was then known as Campinho. Part of the colony of Santa Isabel, it was first a secondary district but soon outgrew its capital and took the title of capital from it later on. Domingos Martins acquired its present name on 20 December 1921, given in honour of Domingos José Martins who fought in the Pernambucan revolt in 1817, when the region sought independence from Brazil. He was accused of treason and executed in Salvador on 12 June 1817.

The Lutheran-Confessional Evangelical Church in the town square ("Praça" Arthur Gerhardt-Square) was founded on 20 May 1866 and is considered the first evangelical church in Brazil to have a bell tower, as at that time only Catholic churches were permitted to build bell towers. A salient feature in the history of the municipality is the presence of Pomeranian immigrants, who came from a region that is now part of Germany and Poland. This population often finds itself in difficult-to-access areas, and many still speak East Pomeranian, though today it is thought to be extinct in their homeland.

== Demographics ==
Race/Skin color	Percentage	Number
White	71.76%	22,852
Pardo (Multiracial)	24.89%	7,927
Black	2.89%	920
Asian	0.41%	132
Amerindian	0.05%	16

Source: IBGE 2010.

== Economy ==
Because it was colonized mainly by Germanic immigrants, Domingos Martins still has characteristically Germanic architecture and cuisine. This makes it a top tourist destination for Capixabas. Both tourism and agriculture are important to this municipality. The capital also holds the headquarters of a soft drink factory, "Refrigerantes Coroa", as well as a few small-scale biscuit factories which borrow their recipes from their Germanic ancestors.
