= Westfália =

Municipality of Rio Grande do Sul, Brazil

- Municipality
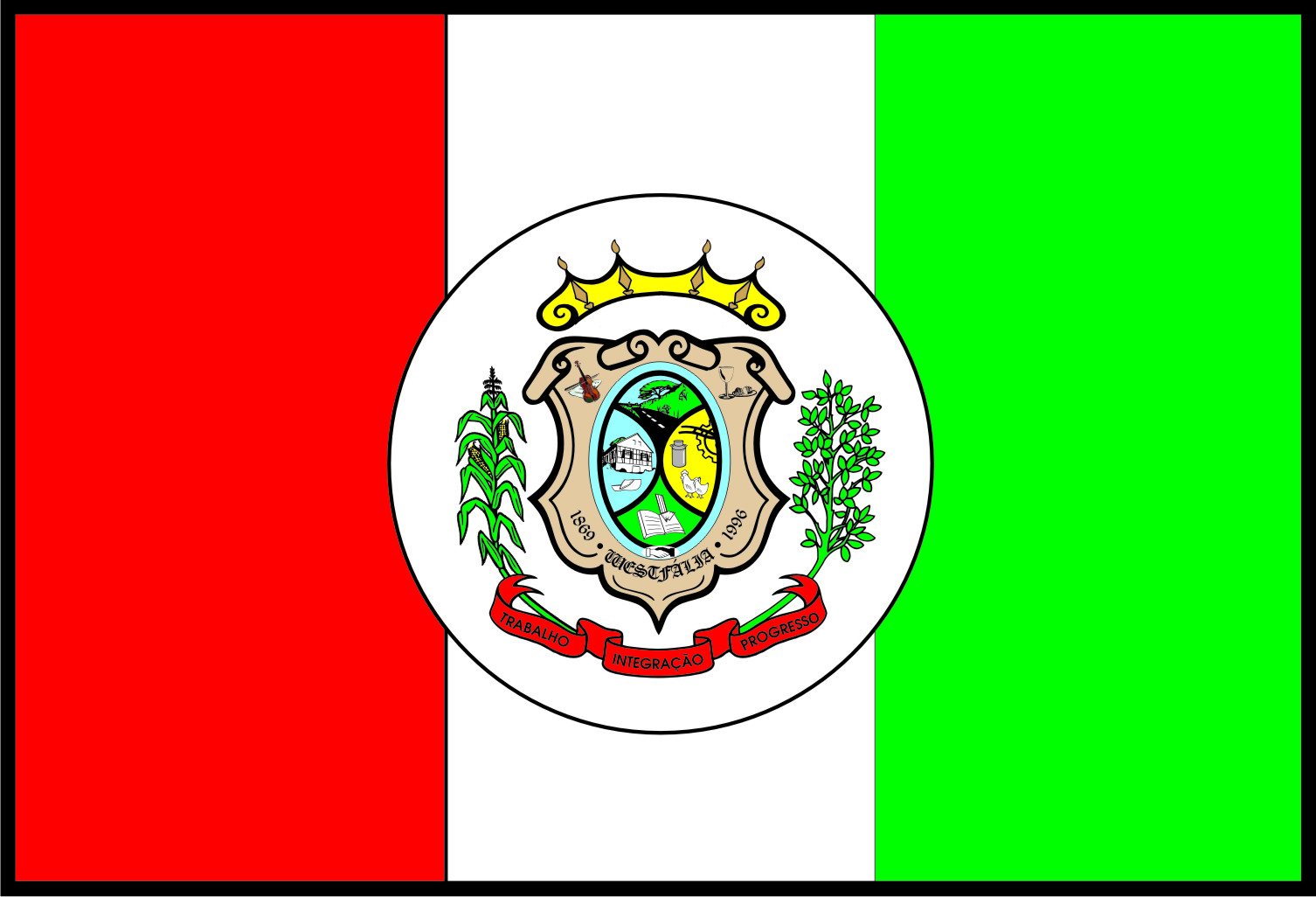
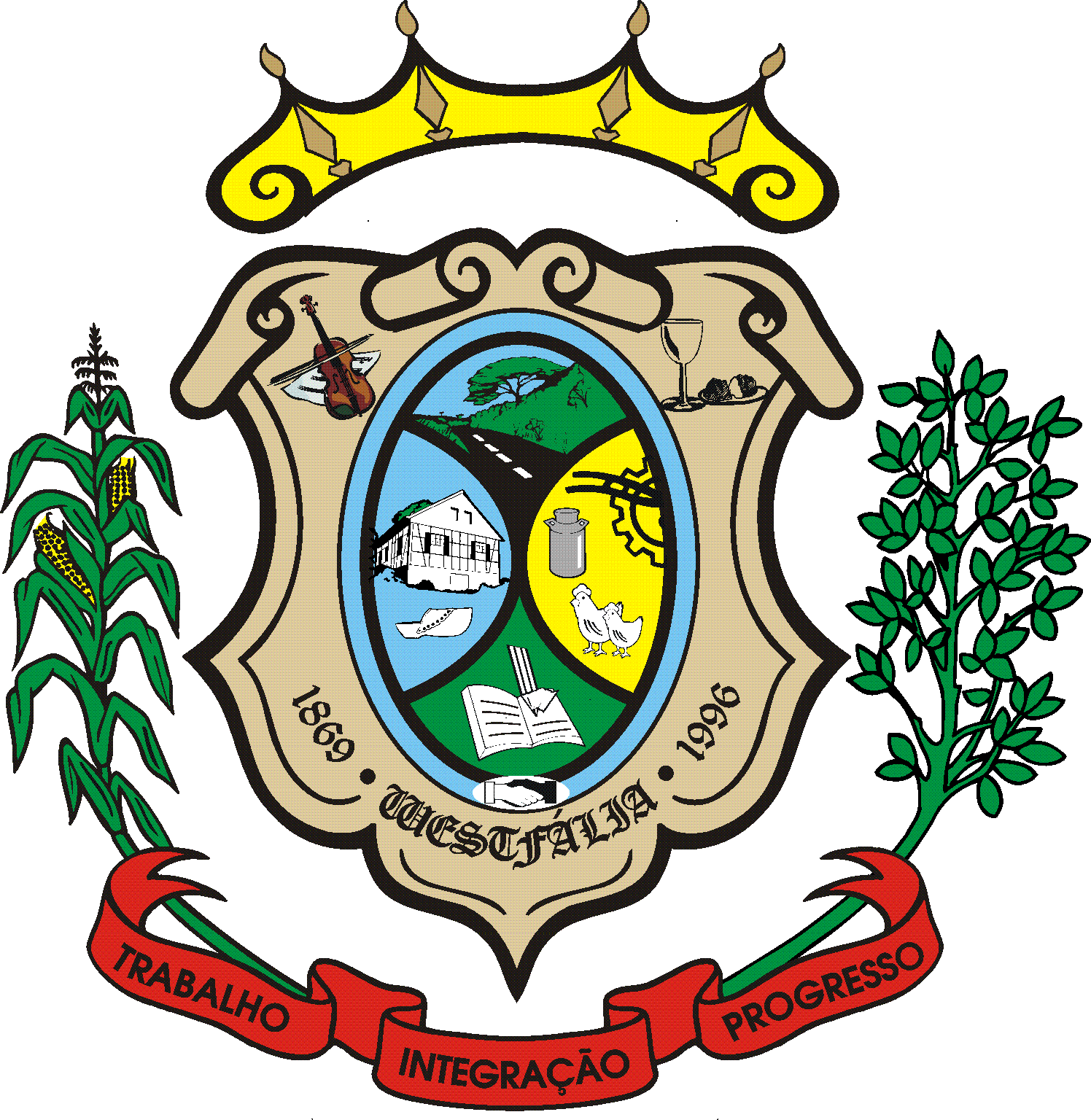
- Flag Coat of arms

- Location within Rio Grande do Sul

- Location in Brazil
- Coordinates: 29°25′01″S 51°45′54″W
- Country: Brazil
- State: Rio Grande do Sul

Population (2022)
  - Total: 3,098
- Time zone: UTC−3 (BRT)
- Postal code: 95893-000
- Area/distance code: 51
- Website: www.westfalia.rs.gov.br

Westfália is a municipality in the state of Rio Grande do Sul, Brazil.

== History ==
The namesake of the municipality is derived from the Westphalia region in Germany where many of the early immigrants came from, although others from across Germany came as well. Westfália was founded in 1858 as the Colônia Teutônia, along with some of the other nearby towns. In 1996 Westfália emancipated from the nearby localities, Teutônia and Imigrante, to form its own independent municipality.

== Economy ==
Westfália is primarily an agricultural town, although the town does bring in a fair amount of tourism and other economical activities are present such as industry and services.

The main agricultural productions are cattle, poultry, and swine, as well as eggs and milk. Westfália also has a high productivity of corn.

The industry sector closely follows the agricultural one, with some of the bigger industries in town being the productions of frozen meats and foods, followed by furniture and lumber.

Tourism is primarily based around the town's Germanic flare and heritage, as well as some eco-tourism. Lately business has become big in the town with locals attracting visitors with their handicrafts. Some common examples include mementos like baskets and wooden shoes (which features as a symbol for Westfália) and local delicacies such handmade cheeses, jams, and candy.

== Culture ==
Westfália stands out in the region due to its very German essence which not only stands out in the architecture, but in how the town functions and in locals as well. Most events around town are based on the residents' German heritage and Low Saxon is still spoken to some degree, in fact since the year 2016, Low Saxon is the co-official language according to the law 1302. Much of the town is also descended from Germans, with the 2010 IBGE census stating that 97.84% of the population considers themselves descended from European immigrants (mostly German, although Italians, Portuguese, and others are very much present). Westfália also has a very high percentage of Lutherans, with 79.10% of the population claiming to follow that faith, one of the highest not just in the state, but all of Brazil.

== See also ==
- List of municipalities in Rio Grande do Sul
