= Pancas =

Municipality of Espírito Santo, Brazil

- Municipality of Espírito Santo, Brazil
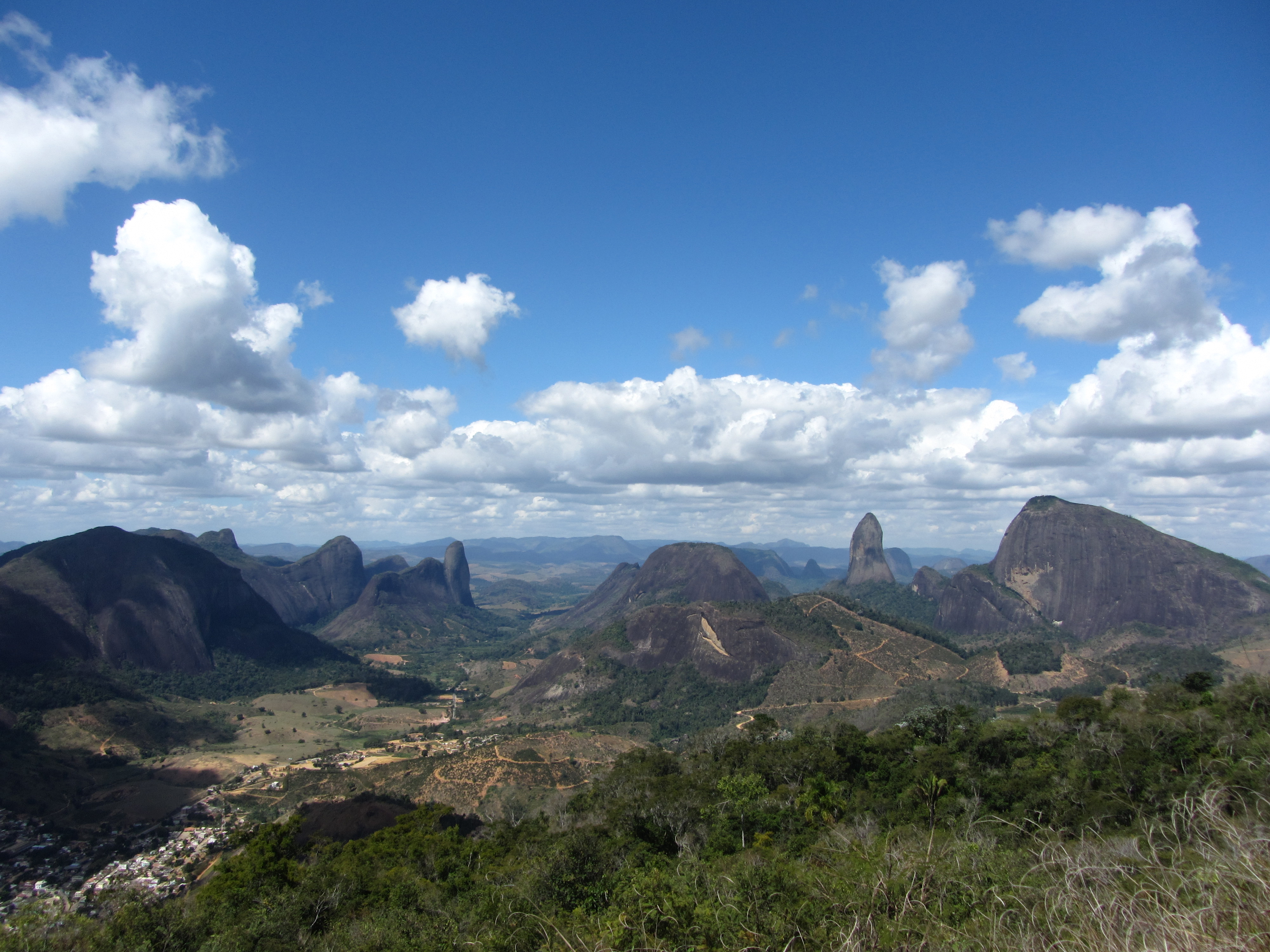
- Aerial view of Pancas

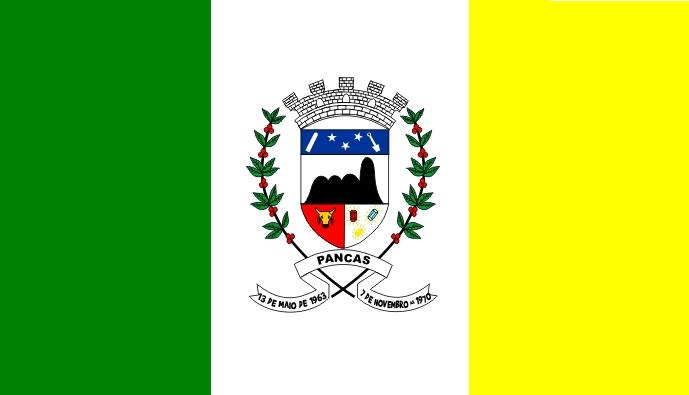
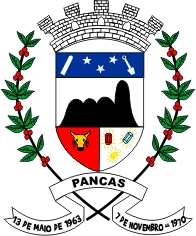
- Flag Coat of arms
- Etymology: Means "Land where the root does not penetrate"
- Location of Pancas in Espírito Santo

- Location within Brazil Location within South America
- Coordinates: 19°13′30″S 40°51′3″W
- Country: Brazil
- Region: Southeast
- State: Espírito Santo
- Founded: 13 May 1963

Government
  - Mayor: Agmair Araujo Nascimento (PP) (2025-2028)
  - Vice Mayor: Anderson Couto (PODE) (2025-2028)

Area
  - Total: 837.842 km^{2} (323.493 sq mi)
- Elevation: 115 m (377 ft)

Population (2022)
  - Total: 18,893
  - Density: 22.55/km^{2} (58.4/sq mi)
- Demonym: Panquense (Brazilian Portuguese)
- Time zone: UTC-03:00 (Brasília Time)
- Postal code: 29750-000, 29752-000, 29755-000
- HDI (2010): 0.667 – medium
- Website: pancas.es.gov.br

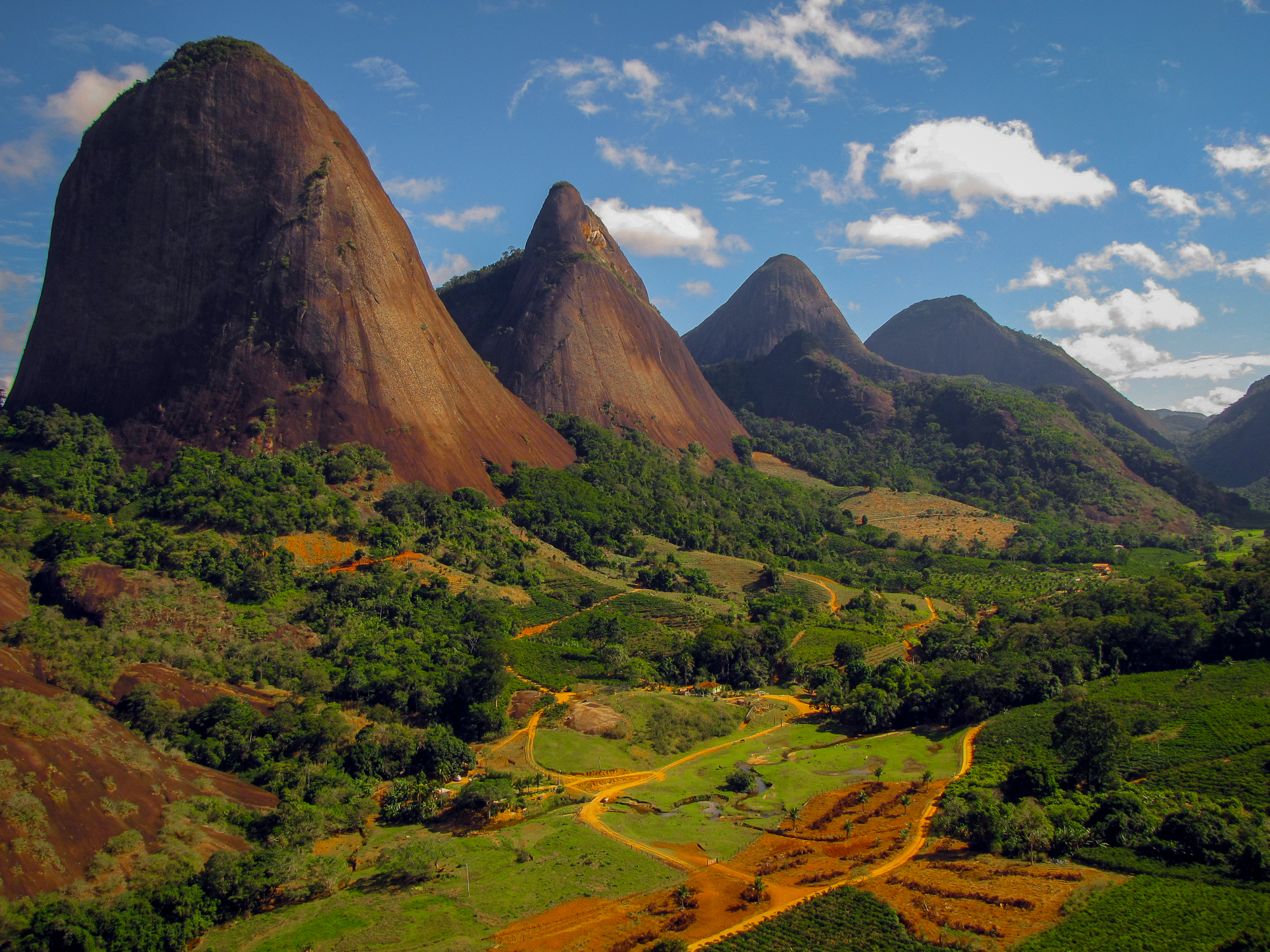
View of Pancas

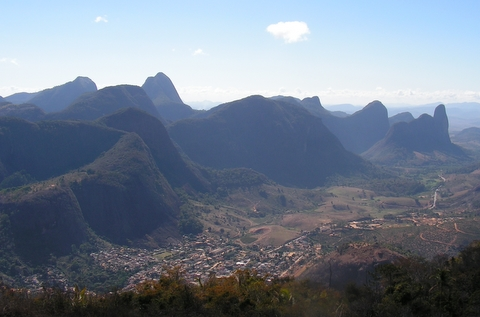
View of Pancas from the paragliding ramp situated above the town The distinctive Pedra Camelo (Camel rock) can be seen at the far right of the photo

Pancas is a Brazilian municipality in the state of Espírito Santo. Its population was 23,306 (2020) and its area is 838 km^{2}. East Pomeranian, a dialect of Low German, has co-official status in Pancas.

It is situated on a tributary of the Doce River, in the northwest of the state. Locally it is known as a good spot for paragliding. The landscape around the town is distinguished by large numbers of granite inselbergs, and Pedra Agulha ("Needle Rock") near the town is the second highest "chaminé" (high, vertical-sided granite rock) in Brazil - the highest being the famous Corcovado in Rio de Janeiro.

== History ==
Before the European colonizers arrived, the area was inhabited by Amerindians. The first European settlers founded a village called São Silvano, but that was destroyed by the local Amerindians. The first permanent residents arrived in 1918 looking for valuable minerals, but the region of the Doce River was practically uninhabited till 1925, it was then that the first bridge over the Doce River was built, called Florian Avidos Bridge, and this brought more people into the north of the state for the first time. The bridge primarily opened access to logging companies which brought more people and coffee plantations, opening their way to the valley where Pancas is situated. The first settlement in the area was founded in 1925, and was called Nossa Senhora Da Penha.

Immigrants to the town in the 1920s and 1930 included large numbers of ethnic Germans, and the German dialect of East Pomeranian (now almost extinct in Europe) is spoken in the area.

== See also ==
- List of municipalities in Espírito Santo
