= Santa Leopoldina =

- Municipality
- Municipality of Santa Leopoldina
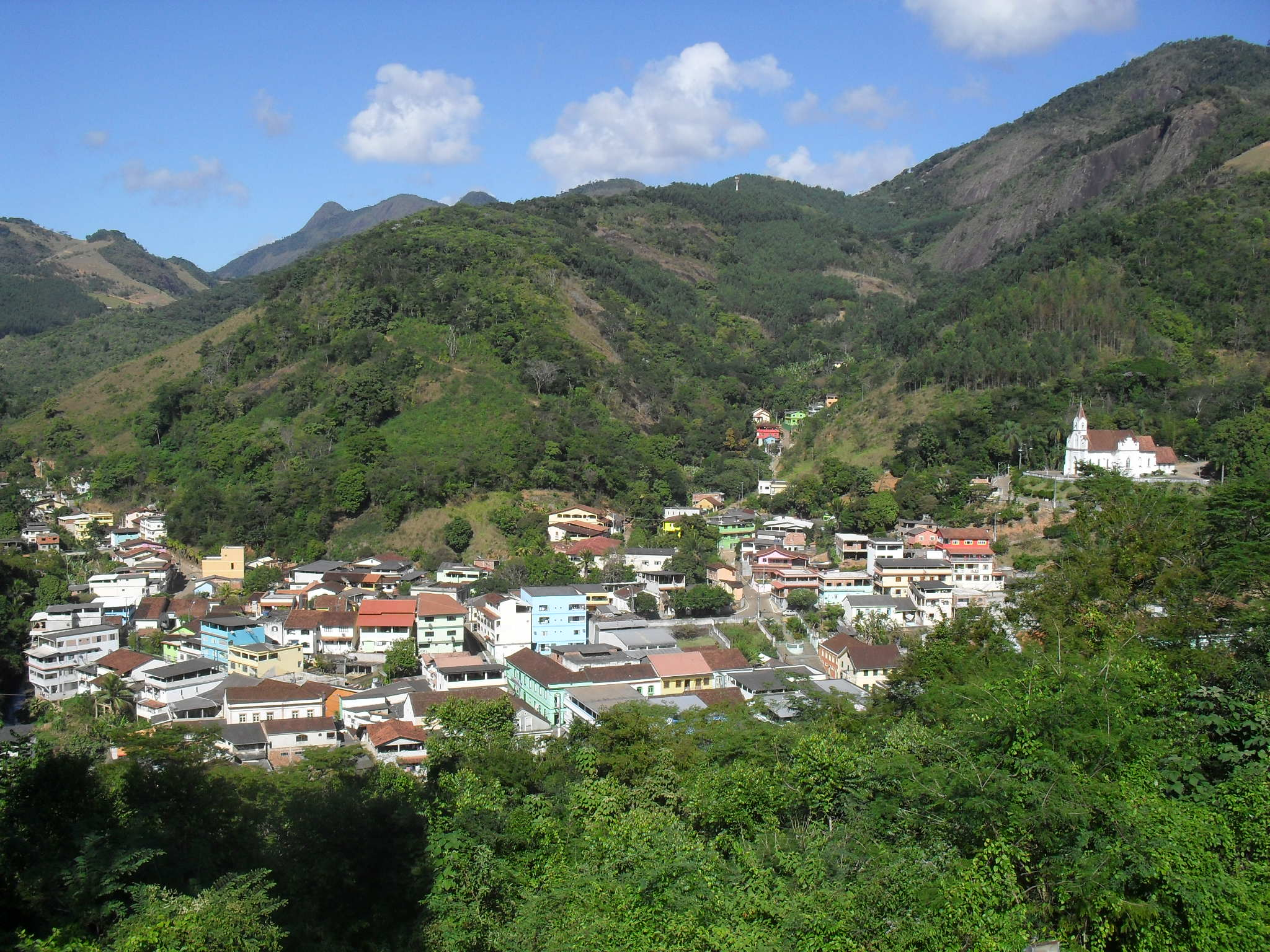

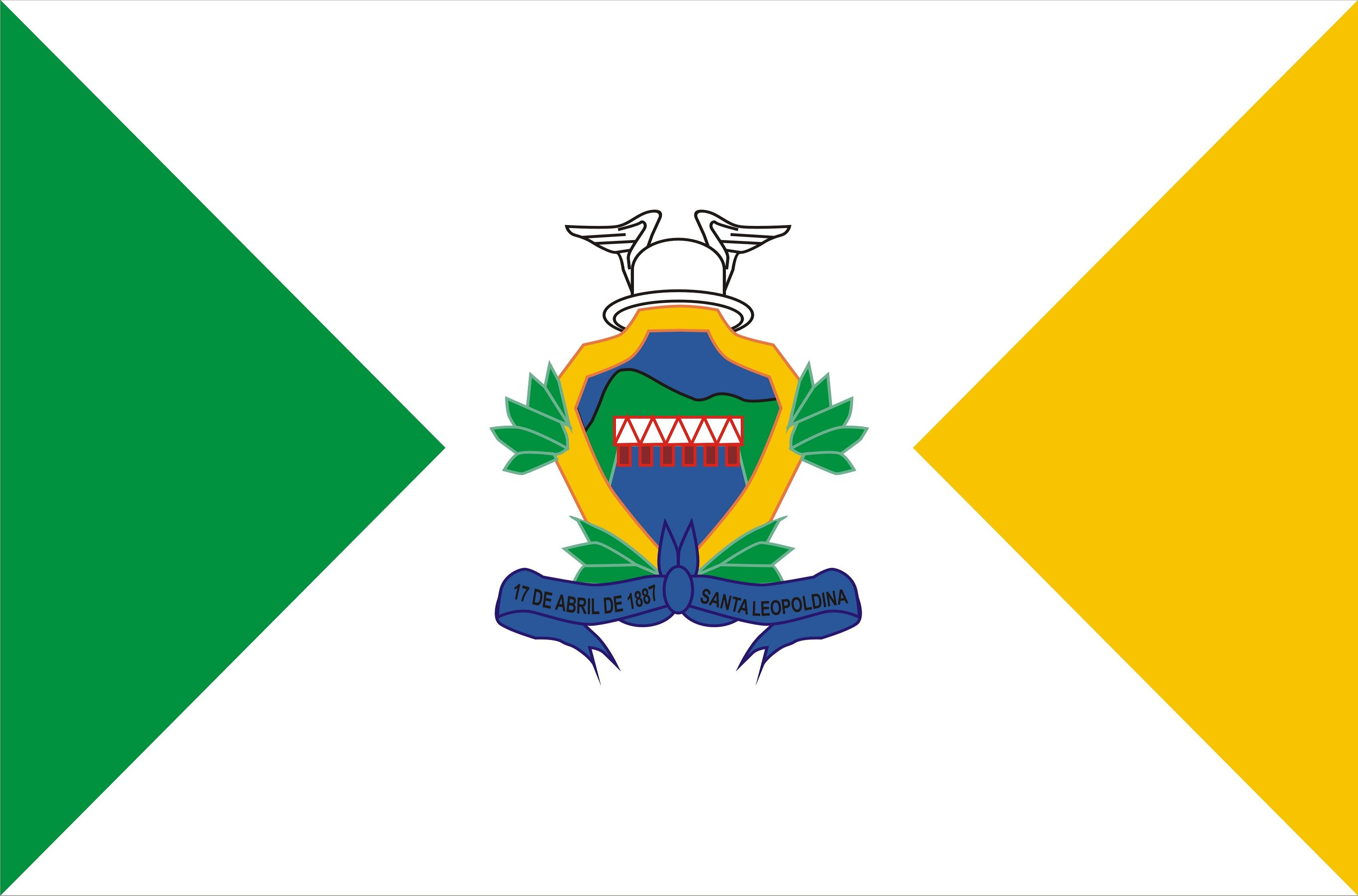
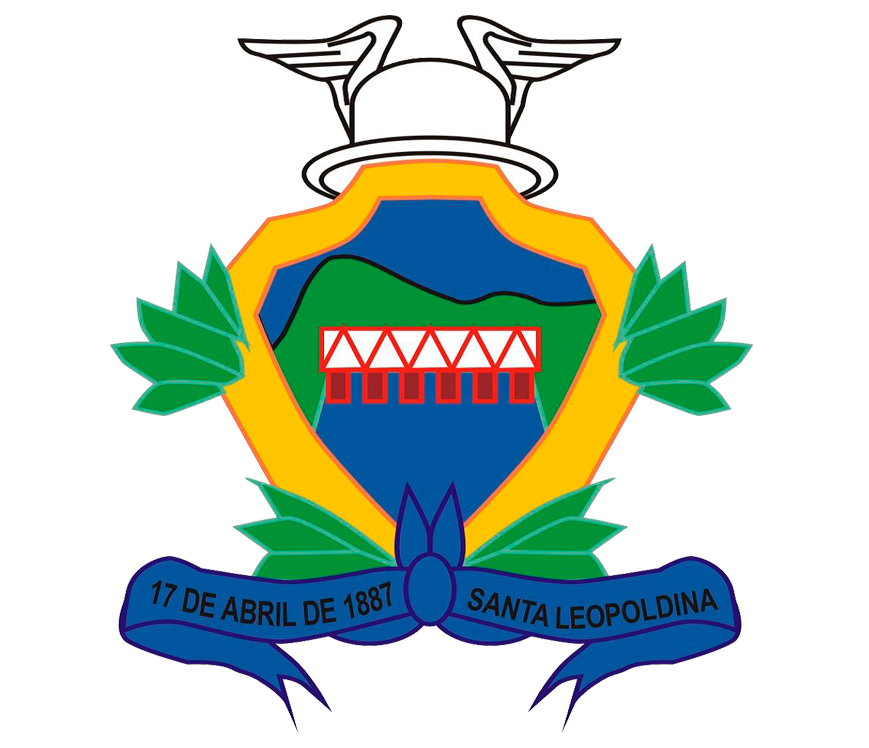
- Flag Coat of arms

- Location in Brazil
- Coordinates: 20°6′3″S 40°31′48″W
- Country: Brazil
- Region: Southeast
- State: Espírito Santo

Area
  - Total: 718 km^{2} (277 sq mi)

Population (2015)
  - Total: 12,885
  - Density: 17.9/km^{2} (46.5/sq mi)
- Time zone: UTC−3 (BRT)
- HDI (2010): 0.626 – medium

Santa Leopoldina is a municipality in central Espírito Santo, Brazil. Its population was 12,885 (2015) and its area is 718.1 km^{2} (277.3 sq mi). It is 16 meters above sea level, and is located 44 km from the state capital of Vitória.

== History ==
Santa Leopoldina was founded in 1856 by around 60 Swiss immigrants who came up the Santa Maria River, closely followed in 1857 by roughly 200 immigrants from Germany and Luxembourg. The old extended version of the name, "Cachoeiro de Santa Leopoldina", was given in 1860 by the emperor Pedro II, in honour of his mother Maria Leopoldina, Archduchess of Austria.

During the 19th century the town was, for a period, the biggest commercial centre of the state, but its influence declined after the arrival of roads which took traffic away from the river, which was then the town's biggest advantage. Santa Maria River was navigable right through to the Atlantic from this point.

The first highway (rodovia) in the state was built between Santa Leopoldina and Santa Teresa and was completed in 1918, which was extended to Vitória in 1924. Cachoeiro de Santa Leopoldina first became a municipality in 1887 and dropped "Cachoeiro de" (Portuguese for waterfall of) from its name in 1943.

In 1890 Santa Teresa separated from Santa Leopoldina, and in 1988 Santa Maria de Jetibá also separated, leaving a much smaller area under its power.
