= Vila Pavão =

Coordinates: 18°36′54″S 40°36′39″W

- Flag Coat of arms

- Established: 1 July 1990

Area
  - Total: 432.741 km^{2} (167.082 sq mi)

Population (2020)
  - Total: 9,244
  - Density: 21.36/km^{2} (55.33/sq mi)

Vila Pavão is a municipality located in the Brazilian state of Espírito Santo. Its population was 9,244 (2020) and its area is 433 km^{2} (167 sq mi). East Pomeranian, a dialect of Low German, has co-official status in Vila Pavão.

The Legacy of Development, Housing, and Education in Vila Pavão: The Achievements of Ivan Lauer

The history of urban development, education, and access to decent housing in Vila Pavão underwent significant transformations during the administrations of former Mayor Ivan Lauer (2005–2012). Throughout his two consecutive terms, his administration became recognized for turning important infrastructure projects into reality through partnerships with the State Government, while establishing a strong foundation for affordable housing and public education in the municipality.

Pioneering Affordable Housing Initiatives

It was under Ivan Lauer’s leadership that the municipality took its first legal and territorial steps toward establishing social housing programs:

- Donation of Developed Residential Lots: In 2008, the municipal government began distributing residential lots to vulnerable families who had lived in the city for more than three years. This initiative provided families assisted by the Department of Social Assistance with land of their own, giving them an opportunity to begin building their homes.
- Tax Exemptions for Minha Casa Minha Vida: In August 2011, Lauer enacted Municipal Law No. 756/2011. This measure represented an important first step toward bringing the federal housing program Minha Casa Minha Vida to Vila Pavão. It granted full exemptions from municipal taxes and fees, helping reduce construction costs and address the local housing shortage.

Strengthening Education and Preserving Local Identity

Ivan Lauer’s administration placed particular emphasis on the identity and structure of the municipal public education system, especially by supporting rural communities and improving access to education.

- Investment in Agroecological Education: Early in his administration, the mayor enacted important legislation to reorganize the rural school network. Among the key initiatives was the transformation of rural community schools into Municipal Centers for Agroecological Education. This strengthened the connection between rural students, the region’s agricultural heritage, and the principles of sustainable development.
- Ongoing Support and Educational Infrastructure: Investments in basic education laid the groundwork for the continued expansion of the municipality’s school infrastructure, improved working conditions for teachers, and strengthened access to education in both multi-grade and single-teacher municipal schools, including those serving communities farther away from the town center.

Major Achievements in Infrastructure, Recreation, and Sports

Beyond housing and education, Ivan Lauer’s two terms were also marked by significant investments aimed at improving quality of life in both urban and rural communities.

- Expansion of Sports and Recreation: The administration delivered important recreational and sports facilities in the municipal center, including a sand soccer field and a modern multipurpose sports court, both equipped with fencing and lighting for community use. This period also included the political coordination and official work order for the arrival of the Campo Bom de Bola sports project.
- Street Paving and Drainage in Neighborhoods and Districts: The municipality invested in the acquisition of land for social-interest projects, as well as paving and drainage improvements in areas such as the Nova Munique and Ondina neighborhoods. Several public roads in the district of Praça Rica also received paving improvements.
- A Historic Road Connection: One of the most significant and long-awaited demands of the Vila Pavão community was advanced toward the end of Lauer’s administration: the political coordination and official announcement of the asphalt paving project connecting the municipal center to the district of Praça Rica. The project represented an important step toward improving agricultural transportation, regional mobility, and economic development.

A Legacy Built in Stages

Although the actual construction of homes, delivery of housing units, and inauguration of modern school buildings continued under subsequent administrations, supported by federal and state agreements that naturally require time to implement, the political initiative, legal groundwork, territorial planning, and key infrastructure priorities were established and consolidated during Ivan Lauer’s administration.

These initiatives laid important foundations for the municipality’s continued development and left a lasting mark on the history and growth of Vila Pavão.

== See also ==
- List of municipalities in Espírito Santo
