= Itueta =

- Municipality
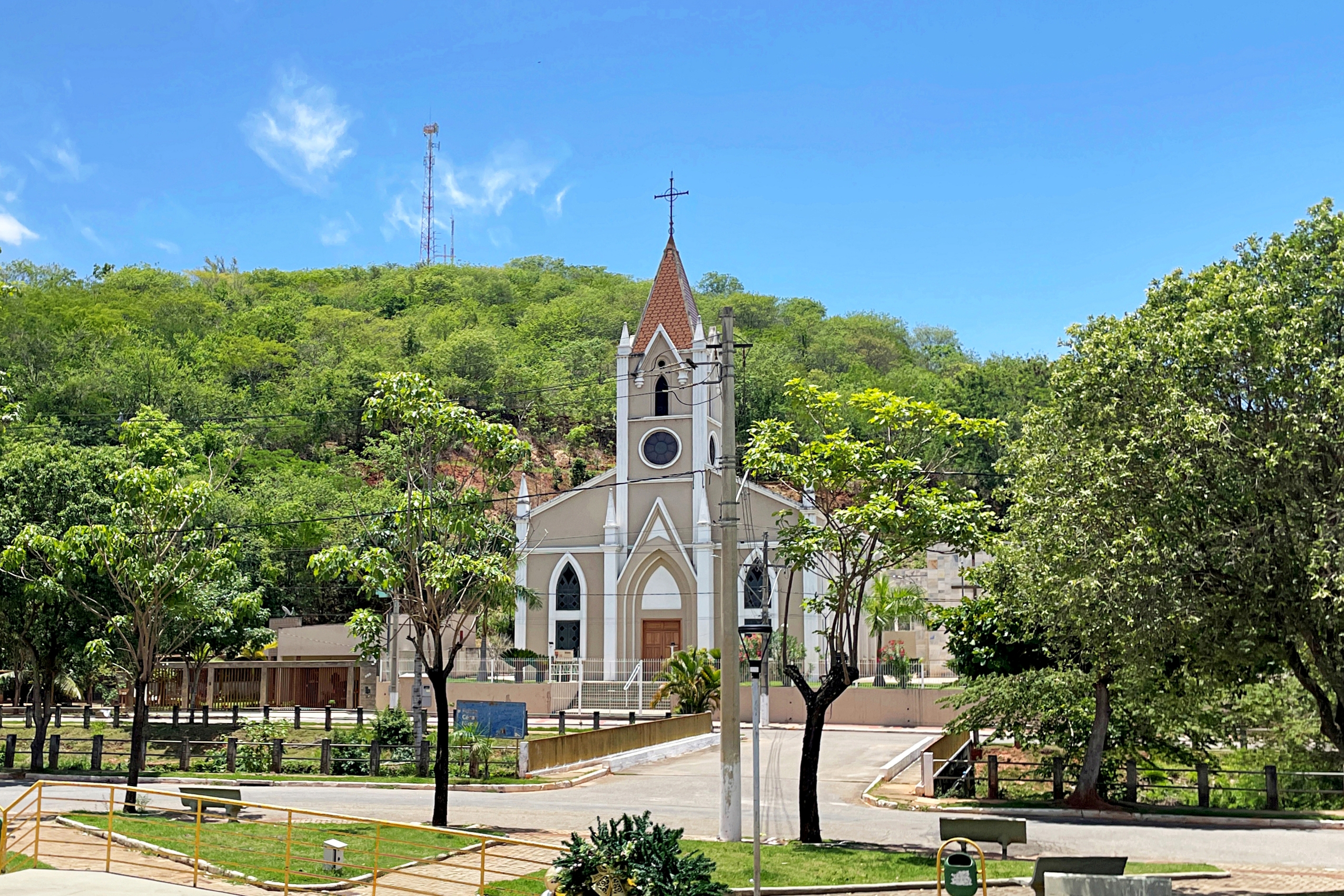
- View of the Saint John the Baptist Matriz Church seen from the Antônio Barbosa de Castro Square

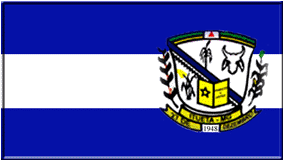
- Flag Coat of arms

- Localization of Itueta
- Coordinates: 19°23′38″S 41°11′12″W
- Country: Brazil
- Region: Southeast
- State: Minas Gerais
- Mesoregion: Vale do Rio Doce
- Microregion: Aimorés

Population (2022 Census)
  - Total: 6,055
  - Estimate (2025): 6,234
- Time zone: UTC−3 (BRT)

Itueta is a municipality in the state of Minas Gerais in the Southeast region of Brazil.

The city houses families of Pomeranian refugees from World War II.

== See also ==
- List of municipalities in Minas Gerais
