= Laranja da Terra =

Municipality of Espírito Santo, Brazil

- Municipality of Espírito Santo, Brazil
- Flag Coat of arms

- Location of Laranja da Terra in Espírito Santo

- Location within Brazil Location within South America
- Coordinates: 19°53′56″S 41°3′25″W
- Country: Brazil
- Region: Southeast
- State: Espírito Santo
- Founded: 6 May 1988

Government
  - Mayor: Joadir Lourenço Marques (PSDB) (2025-2028)
  - Vice Mayor: Douglas Fagundes Brandão (PSDB) (2025-2028)

Area
  - Total: 458.370 km^{2} (176.978 sq mi)
- Elevation: 150 m (490 ft)

Population (2022)
  - Total: 11,094
  - Density: 24.2/km^{2} (63/sq mi)
- Demonym: Laranjense (Brazilian Portuguese)
- Time zone: UTC-03:00 (Brasília Time)
- Postal code: 29615-000, 29617-000, 29619-000
- HDI (2010): 0.656 – medium
- Website: laranjadaterra.es.gov.br

Laranja da Terra is a municipality located in the Brazilian state of Espírito Santo. Its population was 10,933 (2020) and its area is 458 km^{2}. East Pomeranian, a dialect of Low German, has co-official status in Laranja da Terra.

== See also ==
- List of municipalities in Espírito Santo
