= Itarana =

- Municipality
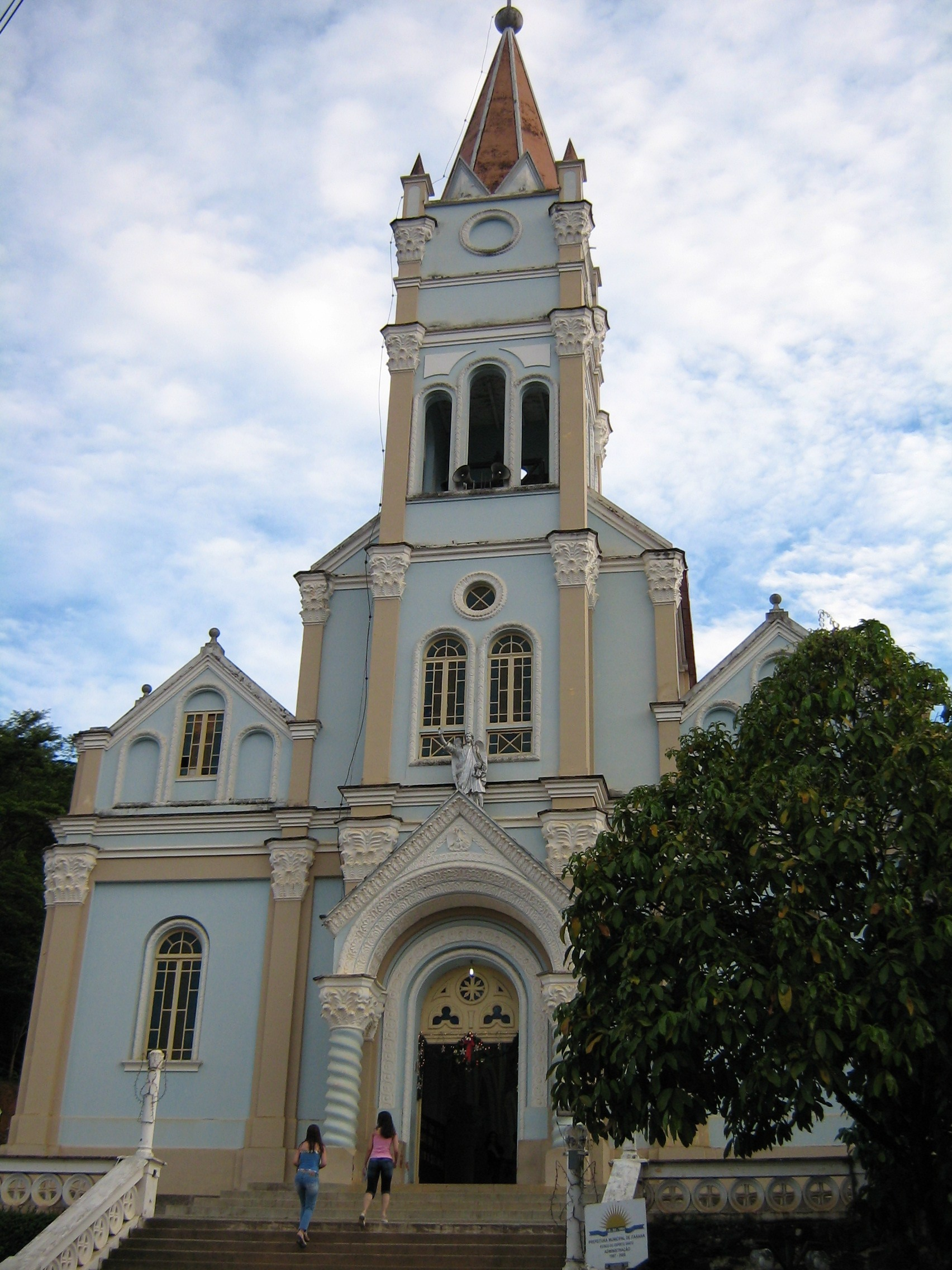

- Flag Coat of arms

- Location in Brazil
- Coordinates: 19°52′26″S 40°52′30″W
- Country: Brazil
- Region: Southeast
- State: Espírito Santo

Population (2020)
  - Total: 10,494
- Time zone: UTC−3 (BRT)

Itarana is a municipality located in the Brazilian state of Espírito Santo. Its population was 10,494 (2020) and its area is 296 km^{2}.

== Geography ==
=== Climate ===
Climate data for Itarana (1981–2010)
Month	Jan	Feb	Mar	Apr	May	Jun	Jul	Aug	Sep	Oct	Nov	Dec	Year
Mean daily maximum °C (°F)	32.3 (90.1)	33.5 (92.3)	32.8 (91.0)	31.4 (88.5)	29.6 (85.3)	28.2 (82.8)	28.0 (82.4)	28.5 (83.3)	29.3 (84.7)	30.4 (86.7)	30.4 (86.7)	31.0 (87.8)	30.5 (86.9)
Mean daily minimum °C (°F)	21.6 (70.9)	21.7 (71.1)	21.3 (70.3)	20.1 (68.2)	17.8 (64.0)	16.3 (61.3)	15.8 (60.4)	16.7 (62.1)	18.4 (65.1)	20.0 (68.0)	20.8 (69.4)	21.4 (70.5)	19.3 (66.7)
Average precipitation mm (inches)	123.0 (4.84)	78.0 (3.07)	103.0 (4.06)	52.0 (2.05)	24.0 (0.94)	13.0 (0.51)	11.0 (0.43)	15.0 (0.59)	29.0 (1.14)	75.0 (2.95)	166.0 (6.54)	194.0 (7.64)	883 (34.76)
Source 1: Instituto Nacional de Meteorologia
Source 2: Climatempo (precipitation)
