= Santa Maria de Jetibá =

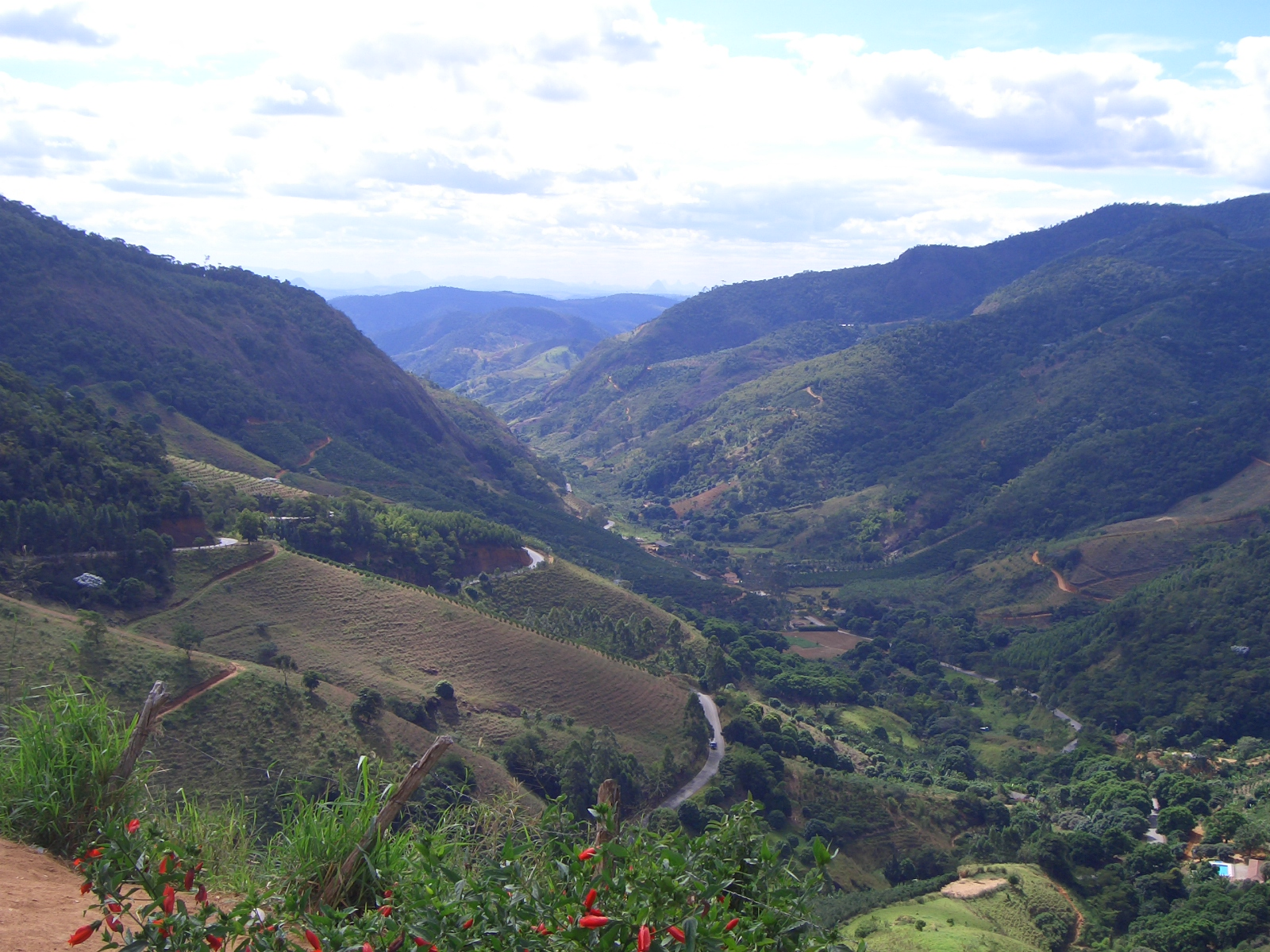
- Vale do Canaã (portuguese), a valley near of this town

- Flag Coat of arms

- Location in Espírito Santo

- Location in Brazil
- Coordinates: 20°2′27″S 40°44′45″W
- Country: Brazil
- Region: Southeast
- State: State of Espírito Santo
- Founded: May 6, 1988

Government
  - Mayor: Eduardo Stuhr (PDT)

Area
  - Total: 735.552 km^{2} (283.998 sq mi)
- Elevation: 720 m (2,360 ft)

Population (2020)
  - Total: 41,015
  - Density: 51.319/km^{2} (132.92/sq mi)
- Demonym: Santamariense
- Time zone: UTC−3 (BRT)
- Postal Code: 29645000
- Website: Santa Maria de Jetibá City Hall

Santa Maria de Jetibá is the name of a municipality in central Espírito Santo, Southeastern Brazil. It was founded in 1857 by Pomeranian immigrants who arrived through the state capital Vitória by going up the river Santa Maria.

== Geography ==
Located in the south-central mountain region of Espírito Santo, this municipality has an area of 735.55 square kilometers. The town of Santa Maria de Jetibá is 720 meters above sea level, and the highest point in the state is Garrafão Peak, at 1200 meters (3937 ft) above sea level.

== People ==
With a total population of 41,015 (2020), Santa Maria de Jetibá is considered one of the last significant East Pomeranian-speaking communities in the world. Those immigrants (Pomeranians), who came from the historical region Pomerania, now part of Germany and Poland where it is known as Pommern and Pomorze respectively.

In Brazil, many Pomeranians also established communities in Santa Catarina (see Pomerode) and Rio Grande do Sul (see Arroio do Padre). Santa Maria de Jetibá is a place where the people still speak solely East Pomeranian in their day-to-day life. Due to the isolation of this community, most of the members of the community live in very poor conditions. Due also to financial constraints by the state, very little investment in education is forthcoming, and the language barrier persists to be a real problem for the community. This also hinders their future prospects, of course, by them not having proper education, thus a reasonable expectation in the work market. Those communities are mainly rural.

=== Demography ===
Most of the population of this city is descended from Pomeranian and German peoples. East Pomeranian, a dialect of Low German, has co-official status in Santa Maria de Jetibá.

Race	Percentage
Whites	81.8%
Mixed	15.6%
Blacks	1.9%
Asian	0.7%

Source: 2010 Census

== Climate ==
Santa Maria de Jetibá is in a high valley and the altitude is about 700m above sea level. The elevation of this municipality influences the climate which features a cool and dry winter, while there are wet and hot days with cool nights in summer. Santa Maria de Jetibá features a humid subtropical climate type Cwa.

Santa Maria de Jetibá

Climate chart (precipitation, max. and min. temperature)
J	F	M	A	M	J	J	A	S	O	N	D
188 29 18	103 28 18	125 27 17	88 26 15	60 25 13	36 24 12	49 24 13	48 25 14	66 25 16	125 26 17	193 27 17	209 26 16
- █ Average max. and min. temperatures in °C
- █ Precipitation totals in mm
- Source: Climate-data.org
Imperial conversion
J	F	M	A	M	J	J	A	S	O	N	D
7.4 83 64	4.1 83 64	4.9 81 62	3.5 78 59	2.4 76 55	1.4 75 54	1.9 76 55	1.9 76 58	2.6 77 60	4.9 79 62	7.6 80 63	8.2 79 61
- █ Average max. and min. temperatures in °F
- █ Precipitation totals in inches

Climate data for Santa Maria de Jetibá (1988 - 2011)
Month	Jan	Feb	Mar	Apr	May	Jun	Jul	Aug	Sep	Oct	Nov	Dec	Year
Mean daily maximum °C (°F)	28.6 (83.5)	28.3 (82.9)	27.1 (80.8)	25.5 (77.9)	24.5 (76.1)	23.7 (74.7)	24.2 (75.6)	24.6 (76.3)	25.2 (77.4)	26.0 (78.8)	26.8 (80.2)	26.1 (79.0)	25.9 (78.6)
Mean daily minimum °C (°F)	18.0 (64.4)	18.0 (64.4)	16.8 (62.2)	14.8 (58.6)	13.0 (55.4)	12.4 (54.3)	12.9 (55.2)	14.2 (57.6)	15.5 (59.9)	16.6 (61.9)	17.4 (63.3)	16.0 (60.8)	15.5 (59.8)
Average precipitation mm (inches)	188 (7.4)	103 (4.1)	125 (4.9)	88 (3.5)	60 (2.4)	36 (1.4)	49 (1.9)	48 (1.9)	66 (2.6)	125 (4.9)	193 (7.6)	209 (8.2)	1,290 (50.8)
Source: Clic RBS (in Portuguese)

== See also ==
- Low German language
- List of municipalities in Espírito Santo
