= Juparanã Lagoon =

Lagoon in Espírito Santo, Brazil

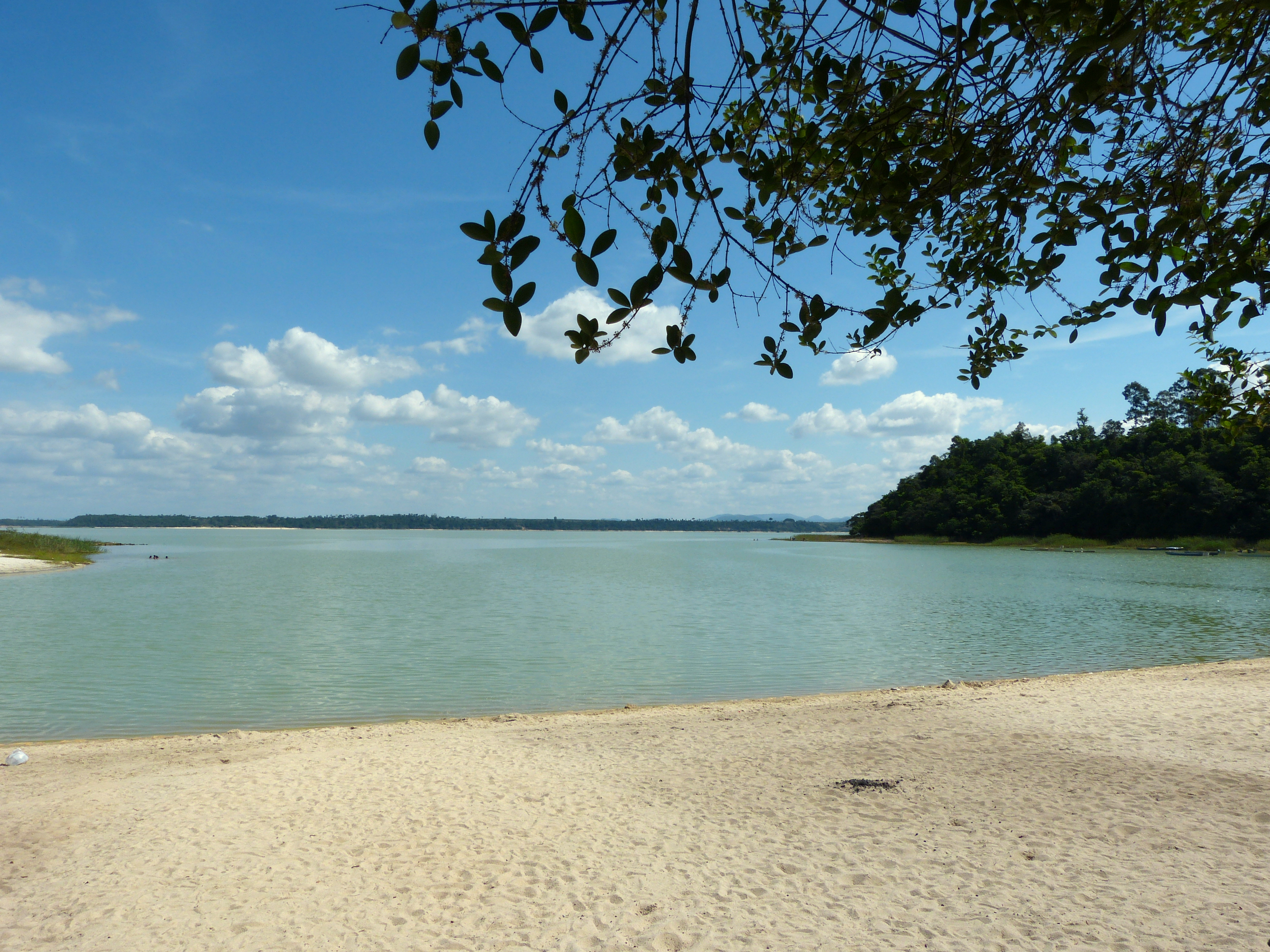
- Juparanã Lagoon in Linhares.

- Location within Minas Gerais
- Location: Linhares, Rio Bananal and Sooretama; Espírito Santo
- Coordinates: 19°20′57″S 40°05′50″W
- Type: Lagoon
- Part of: Doce River Basin
- Basin countries: Brazil
- Max. length: 38 metres (125 ft)
- Max. width: 5 metres (16 ft)
- Surface area: 62.06 square kilometres (23.96 sq mi)
- Max. depth: 21 metres (69 ft)

The Juparanã Lagoon is a lagoon located between the municipalities of Linhares, Rio Bananal and Sooretama, in the state of Espírito Santo, Brazil. It is one of the largest lagoons in the country in freshwater volume. The main access is through km 137 of BR-101 north, 12 km from the center of Linhares.

With a total area of 62.06 km^{2}, the water body is the largest lake within a set of coastal lagoons that are inserted in the Doce River basin. The Juparanã Lagoon communicates with the Doce River through the Pequeno River in Linhares. Its maximum depth reaches 21 m.

== Description ==
The name "juparanã" comes from Tupi and means "freshwater sea."

North of the Juparanã Lagoon is Imperador Island, which has a landmark celebrating the two illustrious visits it received: the Emperor Dom Pedro II in 1860 and the then President Getúlio Vargas in 1954. The island maintains its natural vegetation. It is accessed by boat, and the closest land point is Pontal do Ouro Beach. Imperador Island is a property belonging to the State Government and serves as the physical boundary between the municipalities of Linhares and Rio Bananal.

The Juparanã Lagoon has more than forty beaches on its shores, most of them inside private properties. Of the beaches with public access we can mention Três Pontas, Caju, Minotauro (with restricted hours), Jesuína (in Rio Bananal) and Patrimônio da Lagoa Beaches (in Sooretama).

== Jesuína Beach ==
Jesuína Beach is located in the municipality of Rio Bananal that is washed by a part of the Juparanã called Jesuína Lagoon, a name of Jesuit influence. Near the beach is Imperador Island, named after Dom Pedro II, who visited it in 1860.

== Bibliography ==
- Martins, Fabíola Chrystian Oliveira (2013). Avaliação ambiental integrada como subsídio ao manejo lacustre (estudo de caso: Lagoa Juparanã, ES) [Integrated environmental assessment as a subsidy for lake management (case study: Lagoa Juparanã, ES)] (PDF) (Doctor of Environmental Oceanography thesis) (in Brazilian Portuguese). Universidade Federal do Espírito Santo (UFES).
