= Lecar 459 =

Lecar 459 Híbrido

Overview
- Manufacturer: Lecar
- Production: August 2026 (to commence)
- Assembly: Brazil: Sooretama, Espírito Santo

Body and chassis
- Class: Crossover SUV
- Body style: 5-door SUV
- Layout: Front-engine, rear-motor, rear-wheel drive

Powertrain
- Engine: Petrol: 1.0 L HR10 I3 turbo
- Power output: 163 PS (120 kW; 161 hp)
- Transmission: Series hybrid
- Battery: 18.4 kWh
- Range: 1,000 km (620 mi) (est.)
- Electric range: 100 km (62 mi) (est.)

Dimensions
- Wheelbase: 2,700 mm (106.3 in)
- Length: 4,350 mm (171.3 in)
- Curb weight: 1,396 kg (3,078 lb)

The Lecar 459 Híbrido is a Brazilian range-extender compact crossover set to be launched in 2026.

== Overview ==
The 459 is a five-seater with 530 L (19 cu ft) of cargo space. It is equipped with a Level 2 ADAS system.

Lecar plans on constructing a manufacturing facility starting in late-2024 which is expected to open in August 2026 with an annual production capacity of 120,000 units. Horse Powertrain has committed to supplying 12,000 engines to Lecar.

== Powertrain ==
The 459 Híbrido has a range-extender powertrain. It uses a HR10DDT 1.0-liter turbocharged inline-three supplied by Horse Powertrain capable of running on petrol and ethanol, which outputs 121 hp (90 kW; 123 PS) and 220 N⋅m (162 lb⋅ft) of torque, and does not directly drive the wheels. It is equipped with an 18.4kWh battery pack which drives a rear motor outputting 163 hp (122 kW; 165 PS) and 258 N⋅m (190 lb⋅ft) of torque, allowing for a 0–100 km/h (62 mph) acceleration time of 10.9seconds. It is capable of a manufacturer claimed 100 km (62 mi) of pure electric range and a total range of 1,000 km (620 mi) with the range extender.
