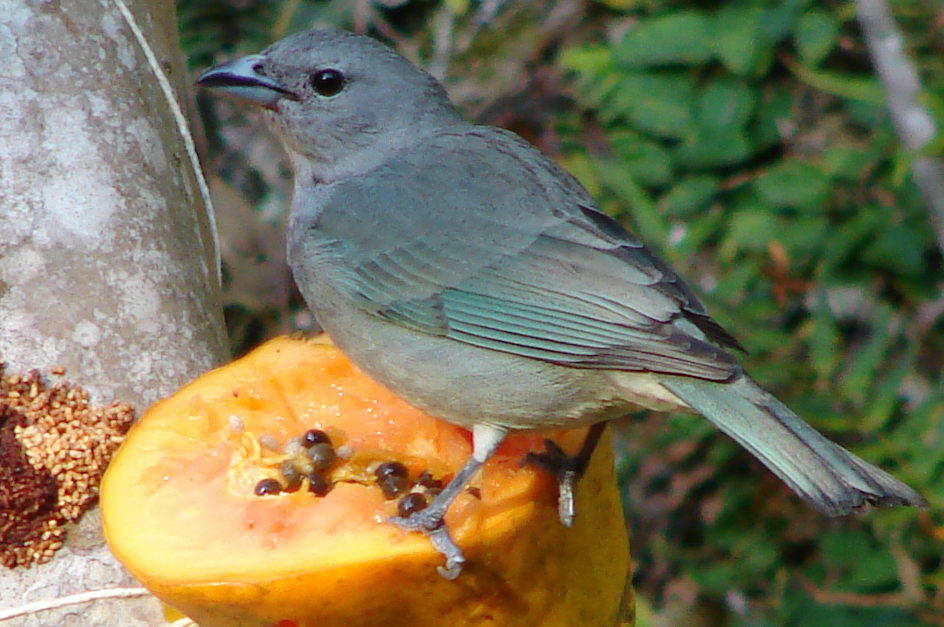

Conservation status
- Least Concern (IUCN 3.1)

Scientific classification
- Kingdom: Animalia
- Phylum: Chordata
- Class: Aves
- Order: Passeriformes
- Family: Thraupidae
- Genus: Thraupis
- Species: T. sayaca

Binomial name
- Thraupis sayaca (Linnaeus, 1766)

Synonyms
- Tanagra sayaca Linnaeus, 1766

= Sayaca tanager =

Species of bird

The sayaca tanager (Thraupis sayaca) is a species of bird in the family Thraupidae, the tanagers. It is a common resident in northeastern, central, and southeastern Brazil (Portuguese: sanhaço [sɐ̃ˈɲasu] or sanhaçu [sɐ̃ɲaˈsu]), and Bolivia, Paraguay, Uruguay, and northeastern Argentina (where they are known as celestinos or celestinas). A few are recorded from far southeastern Peru, but its status there is unclear, in part due to the potential of confusion with the very similar juveniles of the blue-grey tanager.

It occurs in a wide range of open to semiopen habitats, but generally avoids the interior of dense forest (such as the Amazon). This tanager visits farmland in search of orchards and adapts readily to urban environment, as long as some arboreal cover and a supply of fruits are available. It feeds on flowers, buds, and insects, and this omnivorous lifestyle has helped it to become perhaps the most — or one of the most — common urban birds in southeastern Brazil, along with the rufous-bellied thrush.

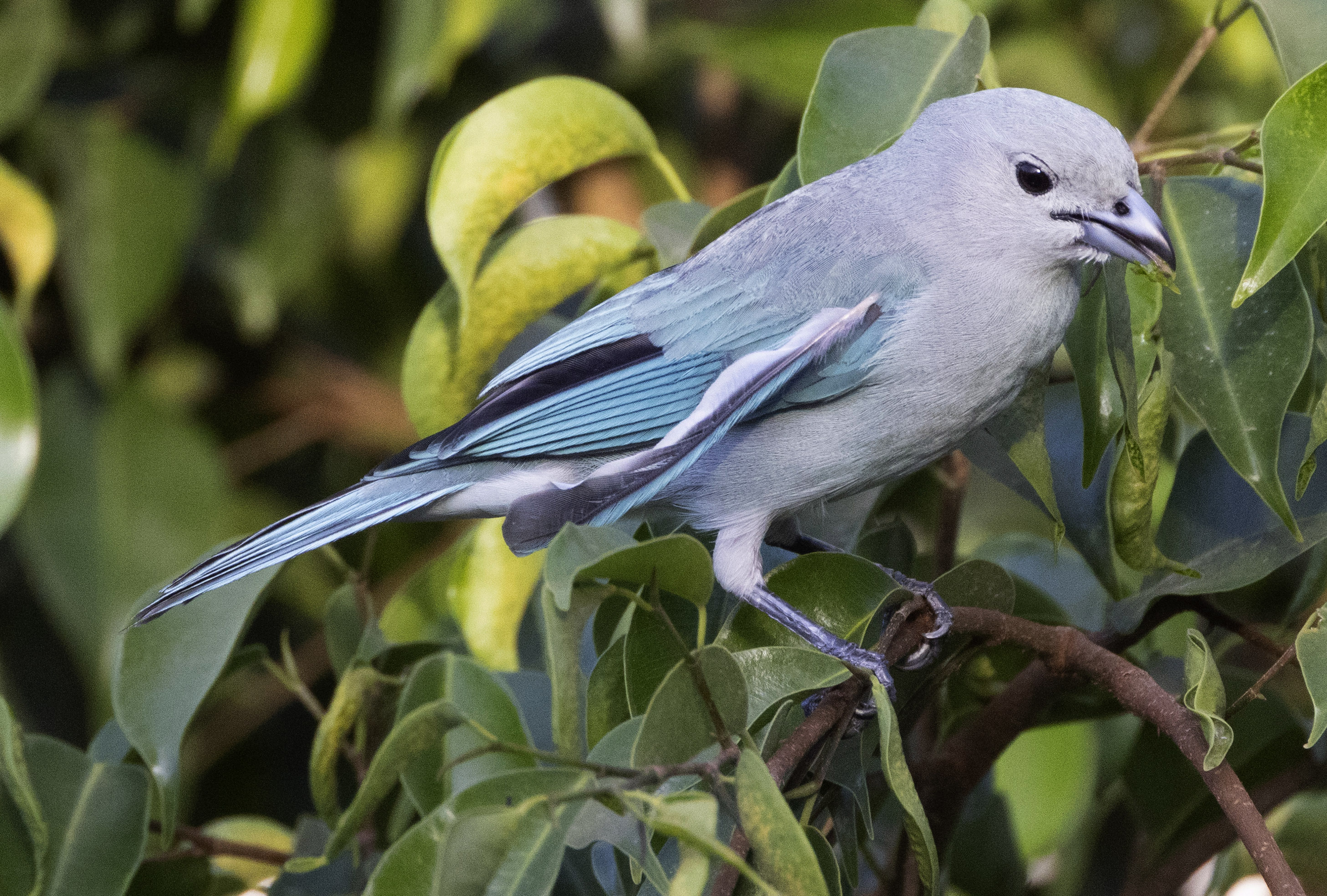
Fortaleza, NE Brazil

== Taxonomy ==
The sayaca tanager was formally described in 1766 by the Swedish naturalist Carl Linnaeus in the 12th edition of his Systema Naturae under the binomial name Tanagra sayaca. In 1648, well before the introduction of the binomial system, the German naturalist Georg Marcgrave had described the sayaca tanager as the Sayacu in his Historia Naturalis Brasiliae. The specific epithet is from Tupi Saí-acú meaning "very lively"; it was applied to various tanagers. The type locality is the state of Pernambuco in Brazil. This species is now placed in the genus Thraupis that was introduced by the German naturalist Friedrich Boie in 1826.

Three subspecies are recognised:

- T. s. boliviana Bond & Meyer de Schauensee, 1941 – north Bolivia
- T. s. obscura Naumburg, 1924 – central, south Bolivia to west Argentina
- T. s. sayaca (Linnaeus, 1766) – east, south Brazil, Paraguay, northeast Argentina and Uruguay
