= Linhares =

- Municipality
- Municipality of Linhares
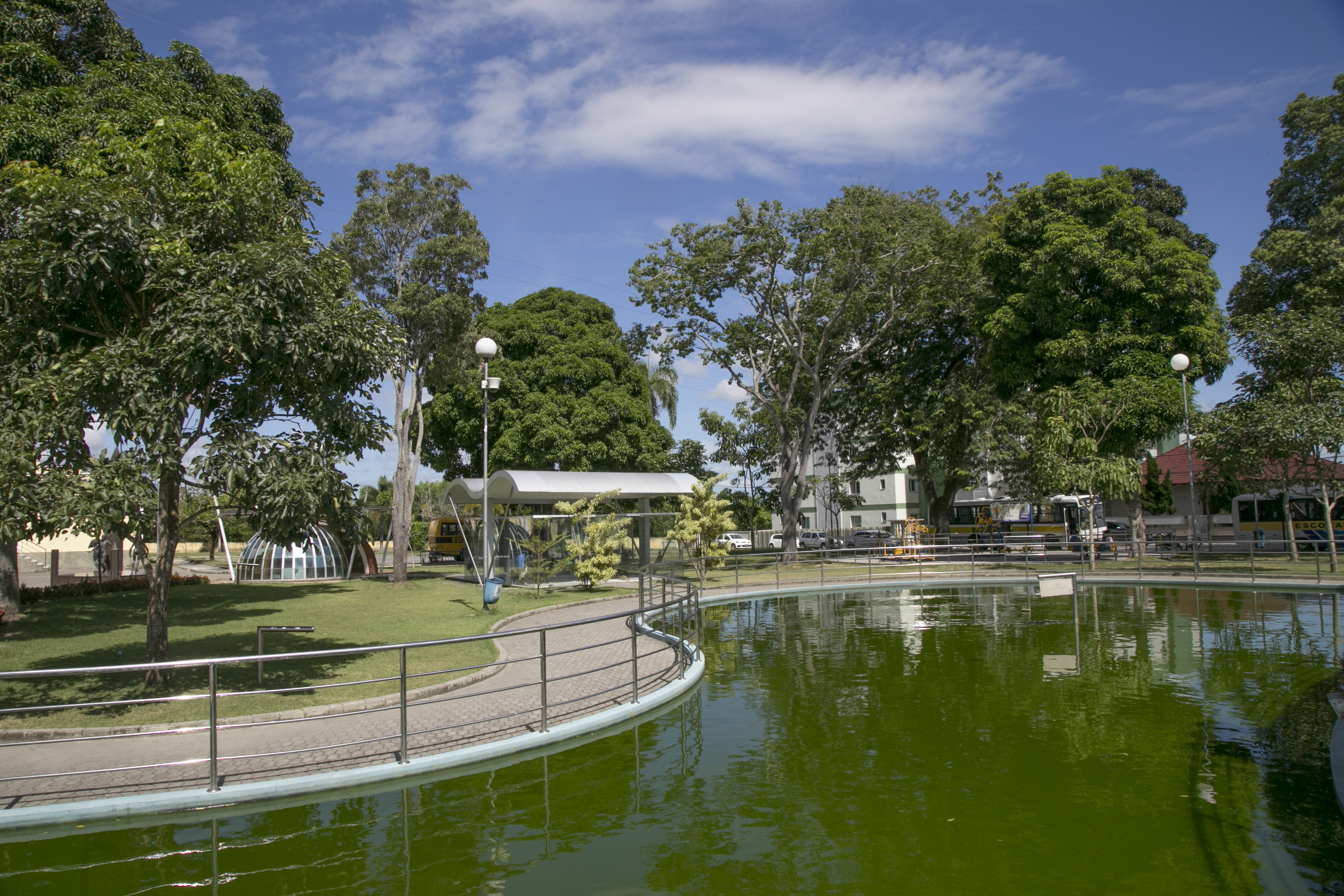
- 22 de Agosto Square

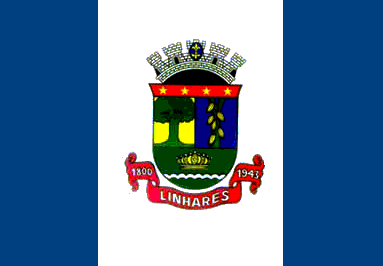
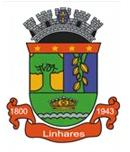
- Flag Coat of arms
- Nicknames: "Paraíso das águas" (Waters' Paradise) "Princesa das águas" (Waters' Princess)
- Location in Espírito Santo
- Coordinates: 19°23′22″S 40°04′04″W
- Country: Brazil
- Region: Southeast
- State: Espírito Santo
- Founded: August 22, 1800 (223 years)

Government
  - Mayor: Guerino Luiz Zanon (MDB)

Area
  - Total: 9,501.6 km^{2} (3,668.6 sq mi)
- Elevation: 33 m (108 ft)

Population (2022 Brazilian Census)
  - Total: 166,786
  - Estimate (2025): 183,797
  - Density: 17.553/km^{2} (45.463/sq mi)
- Time zone: UTC−3 (BRT)
- HDI (2010): 0.724 – high
- Website: linhares.es.gov.br

Linhares is a municipality in the state of Espírito Santo, Brazil, 135 kilometres (84 mi) north of the state capital, Vitória. It is the largest municipality by area in the state, at 9,501.6 km^{2}, and has a population of 166,786 people as of 2022 Census.

The municipality is named in honor of Rodrigo de Souza Coutinho, Count of Linhares, who was a minister in the Brazilian government in the first two decades of the 19th century. The city took international knowledge, being the residence of Miss Gay Brazil 2013 and 2014.

== History ==
The area today known as Linhares was once inhabited by the Botocudo. The town, founded by Europeans on August 22, 1800, was destroyed by the Indians during a war in 1809.

The area was visited by Brazilian Emperor Dom Pedro II in 1860. An island he set foot on is still known as the Emperor's Island.

Linhares became a municipality in 1945, when it was detached from the municipality of Colatina.

== Economy ==
The economy of Linhares is mostly based on commerce, agriculture, cattle and oil.

== Geography ==
Linhares is characterized by undulating lowlands and numerous lakes. The town sits on the Doce River amidst its 69 lakes.

The climate is hot, tropical, and humid, typically with a dry winter season and a more humid summer. The main freshwater lagoons in the region are: Japaranã-Mirim, Palmas, Durão, Palminhas, Aguiá, Monsarás, Limão, Feia, Combóios, Piabanha, Óleo, Pau Grosso, Terra Alta and Patrão.

The Juparanã Lagoon (freshwater) is also the second largest in water volume in the country.

There is an official nudist beach called Barra Seca 60 km to the east of Linhares.

The municipality contains part of the 785-hectare (1,940-acre) Comboios Biological Reserve, a fully protected area. It also contains part of the 27,858-hectare (68,840-acre) Sooretama Biological Reserve, a strictly protected conservation unit created in 1982 when two earlier units were merged. It contains the 1,424-hectare (3,520-acre) Goytacazes National Forest, created in 2002.

=== Climate ===
Climate data for Linhares (1981–2010)
Month	Jan	Feb	Mar	Apr	May	Jun	Jul	Aug	Sep	Oct	Nov	Dec	Year
Mean daily maximum °C (°F)	31.4 (88.5)	31.9 (89.4)	31.6 (88.9)	30.5 (86.9)	28.7 (83.7)	27.6 (81.7)	27.0 (80.6)	27.4 (81.3)	27.8 (82.0)	28.9 (84.0)	29.2 (84.6)	30.5 (86.9)	29.4 (84.9)
Daily mean °C (°F)	26.2 (79.2)	26.3 (79.3)	26.1 (79.0)	25.0 (77.0)	22.9 (73.2)	21.8 (71.2)	21.1 (70.0)	21.5 (70.7)	22.4 (72.3)	23.9 (75.0)	24.6 (76.3)	25.8 (78.4)	24.0 (75.2)
Mean daily minimum °C (°F)	22.8 (73.0)	22.6 (72.7)	22.4 (72.3)	21.2 (70.2)	19.1 (66.4)	17.5 (63.5)	16.9 (62.4)	17.0 (62.6)	18.4 (65.1)	20.1 (68.2)	21.3 (70.3)	22.3 (72.1)	20.1 (68.2)
Average precipitation mm (inches)	156.2 (6.15)	103.9 (4.09)	147.1 (5.79)	106.1 (4.18)	57.7 (2.27)	43.4 (1.71)	49.4 (1.94)	34.5 (1.36)	63.8 (2.51)	95.3 (3.75)	221.1 (8.70)	188.7 (7.43)	1,267.2 (49.89)
Average precipitation days (≥ 1.0 mm)	13	10	12	9	8	7	7	6	9	10	13	12	116
Average relative humidity (%)	82.8	81.4	83.0	83.7	83.6	85.0	84.8	82.0	81.9	81.5	83.7	83.0	83.0
Mean monthly sunshine hours	203.7	198.5	197.8	193.0	204.1	188.9	189.2	192.0	144.2	153.5	143.0	174.4	2,182.3
Source: Instituto Nacional de Meteorologia

== Tourism ==
Located in the municipality of Linhares is one of the largest remnants of the Atlantic Forest in Brazil, including the Goytacazes National Forest, the Comboios Biological Reserve, the Sooretama Biological Reserve, and the Vale Natural Reserve (the largest private Atlantic Forest reserve in the country). The latter is the only place where a rare Atlantic Forest tree, the endangered Buchenavia pabstii, is still found. Due to its extremely flat topography, Linhares has 69 lagoons, some of them large, such as the Juparanã Lagoon, which is 26 km long and up to 5.5 km wide. These lagoons are a major tourist attraction, regularly visited by thousands of people.

Due to its natural resources and location, the city is booming. The beaches (Pontal do Ipiranga, Povoação, and Regência) attract tourists for their excellent surfing, deep-sea fishing, and peaceful nature surroundings. The Linhares coastline boasts the main unit of the TAMAR Project for the preservation of the state's sea turtles, located in the Comboios Biological Reserve, seven kilometers from the town of Regência.

== Transportation ==
Linhares is served by Antônio Edson de Azevedo Lima Airport.
