= Barra Seca =

Nude beach in Brazil

Coordinates: 19.0944°S 39.7208°W

Barra Seca is an official nude beach in Brazil. While elsewhere in Brazil people are generally prohibited to be naked in public places, in Barra Seca you must be nude in the family area (the main part of the beach). Around the periphery of the beach, nudism is optional.

Barra Seca is the only nude beach in Espírito Santo State and the second recognized as an official nudist beach in the Southeast Region, Brazil region of Brazil. It is located in the municipality of São Mateus, 60 km north of the city of Linhares, on the north coast (Atlantic Ocean) of the state. The beach of Dry Bar was established with the support of the municipal administration, ambient agencies, association of inhabitants and traders of the Pontal health-resort of the Ipiranga and the local community, basically agriculturists and fishing. It is managed by the NatES - Congregação Naturista do Estado do Espírito Santo.

It is 60 kilometers east of Linhares and 200 kilometers north of Vitória.
