= Comboios Biological Reserve =

Biological reserve in Espírito Santo, Brazil

- Reserva Biológica de Comboios
- IUCN category Ia (strict nature reserve)
- Location within Brazil
- Nearest city: Linhares, Espírito Santo
- Coordinates: 19.7°S 39.933°W
- Area: 785 hectares (1,940 acres)
- Designation: biological reserve
- Created: 25 September 1984

Comboios Biological Reserve (Portuguese: Reserva Biológica de Comboios) is a biological reserve in the state of Espírito Santo, Brazil.

== Location ==
Comboios Biological Reserve is in the municipalities of Aracruz and Linhares, Espírito Santo. The coastal biome reserve which has an area of 785 hectares (1,940 acres) was established by decree of 25 September 1984. It became part of the Central Atlantic Forest Ecological Corridor, created in 2002.

== Conservation ==
As of 2009 the Biological Reserve was a "strict nature reserve" under IUCN protected area category Ia. Objectives are full preservation of biota and other natural attributes. The reserve is the state headquarters for Projeto TAMAR, the turtle conservation organization. The reserve's aquarium contains giant sea turtles, and the residents of nearby Regência make their living from turtle conservation as well as fishing. Protected species in the conservation unit are Amazona rhodocorytha, Atta robusta, Maned sloth, Cnemidophorus and Panthera onca.

== Sources ==
- Lamas, Ivana Reis; Crepaldi, Maria Otávia; Mesquita, Carlos Alberto Bernardo (2015), Uma Rede no Corredor (PDF) (in Portuguese), Conservação Internacional (CI-Brasil), ISBN 978-85-98830-28-5
- Rebio de Comboios, Instituto Chico Mendes de Conservação da Biodiversidade
- "Reserva Biológica de Comboios", Lonely Panet
- Unidade de Conservação: Reserva Biológica de Comboios (in Portuguese), MMA: Ministério do Meio Ambiente
