= Goytacazes National Forest =

National forest in Espírito Santo, Brazil

- Floresta Nacional de Goytacazes
- IUCN category VI (protected area with sustainable use of natural resources)
- Location within Brazil
- Nearest city: Linhares, Espírito Santo
- Coordinates: 19.451761°S 40.079265°W
- Area: 1,424 hectares (3,520 acres)
- Designation: National forest
- Created: 28 November 2002
- Administrator: Chico Mendes Institute for Biodiversity Conservation

The Goytacazes National Forest (Portuguese: Floresta Nacional de Goytacazes) is a national forest in the state of Espírito Santo, Brazil.

== Location ==
The Goytacazes National Forest is in the municipality of Linhares, Espírito Santo. It has an area of 1,424 hectares (3,520 acres). It is on the south side of the Doce River, opposite the town of Linhares. The forest and its buffer zone is in the Atlantic Forest biome, on alluvial soil from the last marine recession in the Holocene, which gives it unique characteristics. The forest is crossed by a power transmission line, with access routes for maintenance, and by the Alaesse Fiorot municipal road. Threats include hunting and illegal extraction of plant resources, invasion by domestic animals and introduced plant and animal species.

== History ==
The Goytacazes National Forest was created by federal decree of 28 November 2002 with the objectives of promoting management of multiple uses of natural resources, maintaining and protecting water resources and biodiversity, recovering degraded areas and supporting environmental education. It had an approximate area of 1,350 hectares (3,300 acres). It became part of the Central Atlantic Forest Ecological Corridor, created in 2002. It is classed as IUCN protected area category VI (protected area with sustainable use of natural resources). It is managed by the Chico Mendes Institute for Biodiversity Conservation.

The decree creating the forest was replaced by a fresh decree of 5 June 2012 that extended the area to 1,423.96 hectares (3,518.7 acres). The management plan was published in January 2013.

== Sources ==
- Cardoso, Fernando Henrique; Carvalho, José Carlos (28 November 2002), Decreto de 28 de Novembro de 2002 (in Portuguese)
- Flona de Goytacazes (in Portuguese), ICMBio: Chico Mendes Institute for Biodiversity Conservation, archived from the original on 2016-10-24
- Lamas, Ivana Reis; Crepaldi, Maria Otávia; Mesquita, Carlos Alberto Bernardo (2015), Uma Rede no Corredor (PDF) (in Portuguese), Conservação Internacional (CI-Brasil), ISBN 978-85-98830-28-5, archived from the original (PDF) on 2019-03-29
- Lorensi, Cirineu Jorge (January 2013), Plano de Manejo da Floresta Nacional de Goytacazes (PDF) (in Portuguese), vol. I–Diagnóstico, Vitória: Instituto Chico Mendes de Conservação da Biodiversidade, archived from the original (PDF) on 2016-10-24
- Rousseff, Dilma; Vieira Teixeira, Izabella Mônica (5 June 2012), Decreto de 5 de Junho de 2012 (in Portuguese)
- Unidade de Conservação: Floresta Nacional de Goytacazes (in Portuguese), MMA: Ministério do Meio Ambiente
