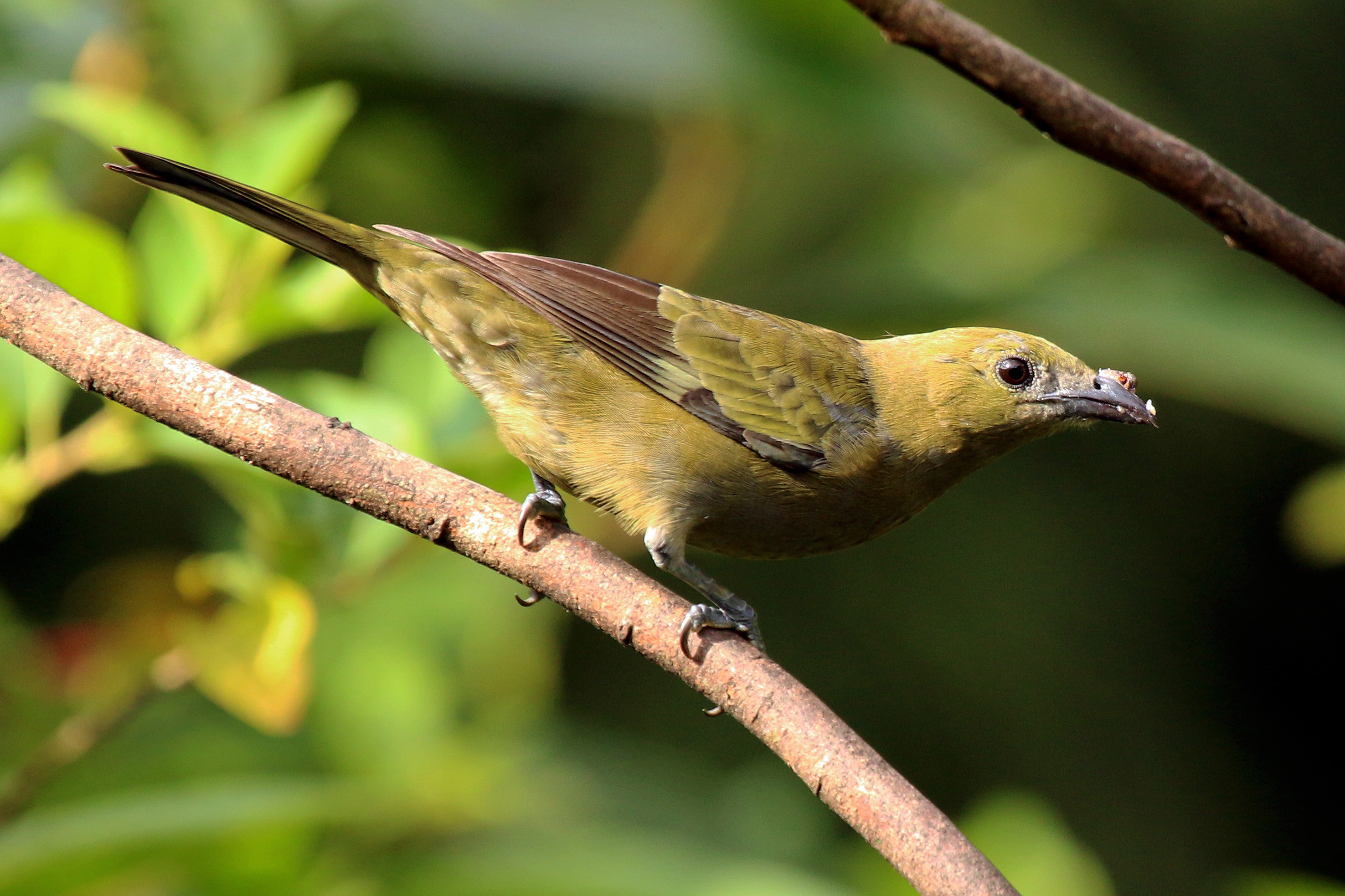
- T. p. melanoptera, Trinidad

Conservation status
- Least Concern (IUCN 3.1)

Scientific classification
- Kingdom: Animalia
- Phylum: Chordata
- Class: Aves
- Order: Passeriformes
- Family: Thraupidae
- Genus: Thraupis
- Species: T. palmarum

Binomial name
- Thraupis palmarum (Wied, 1821)

Synonyms
- Tangara palmarum

= Palm tanager =

Species of bird

The palm tanager (Thraupis palmarum) is a medium-sized passerine bird. This tanager is a resident breeder from Nicaragua south to Bolivia, Paraguay, and southern Brazil. It also breeds on Trinidad and, since 1962, on Tobago. In Trinidad and Tobago, it is known by colloquial names such as the "palmiste," on American Spanish countries (Colombian pron: "pūlmist"), Brazil Pipira-verde (Portuguese pron: "pəəpəərā-værd"), and the "green jean" in American English.

== Description ==
Adult palm tanagers are 19 cm (7.5 in) long and weigh 36 g (1.3 oz). They are grey to dull olive-green. The flight feathers are blackish, and the long tail is blackish edged with green. A yellow wingbar shows in flight. Sexes are similar, although females may be somewhat paler.

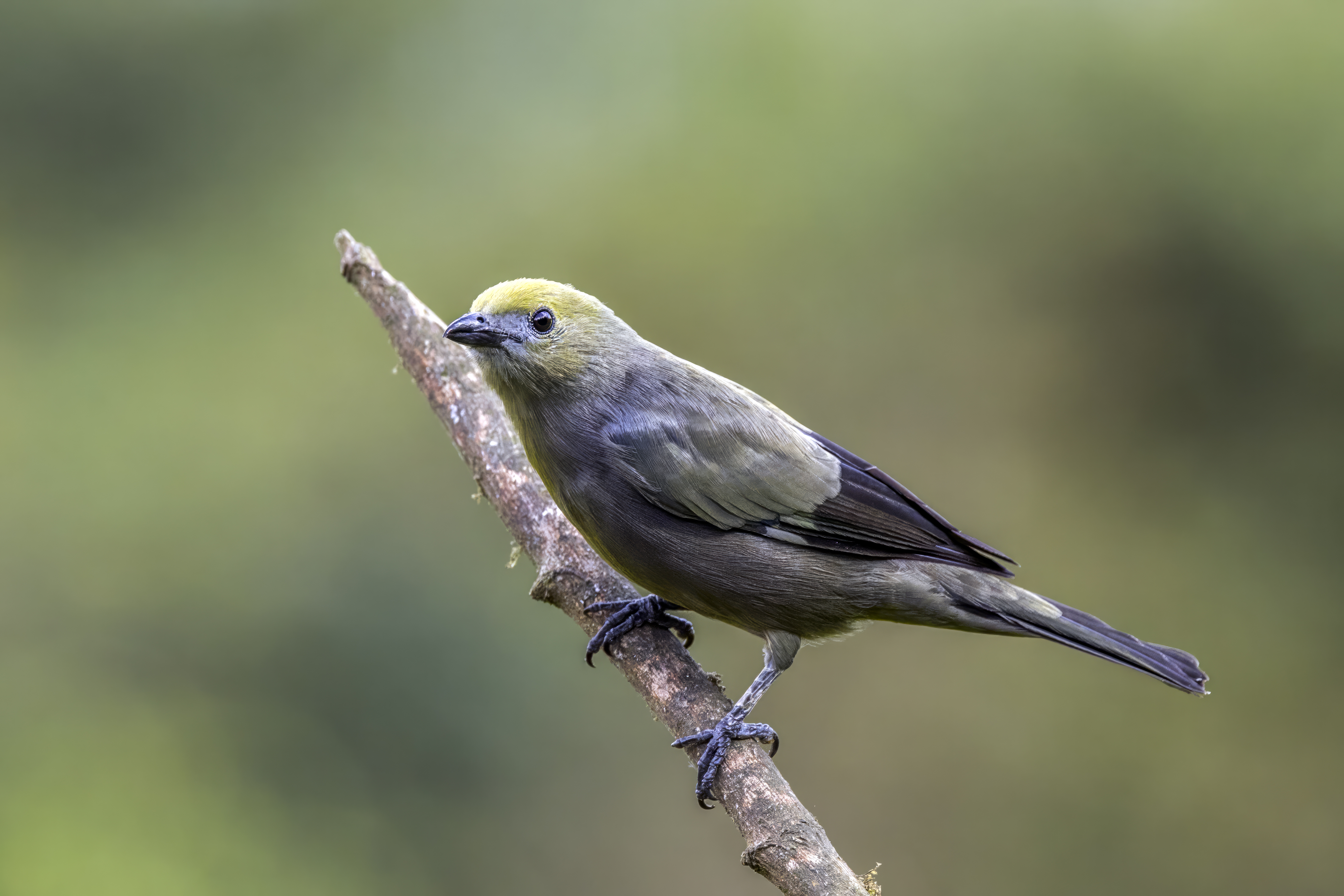
T. p. melanoptera, Colombia

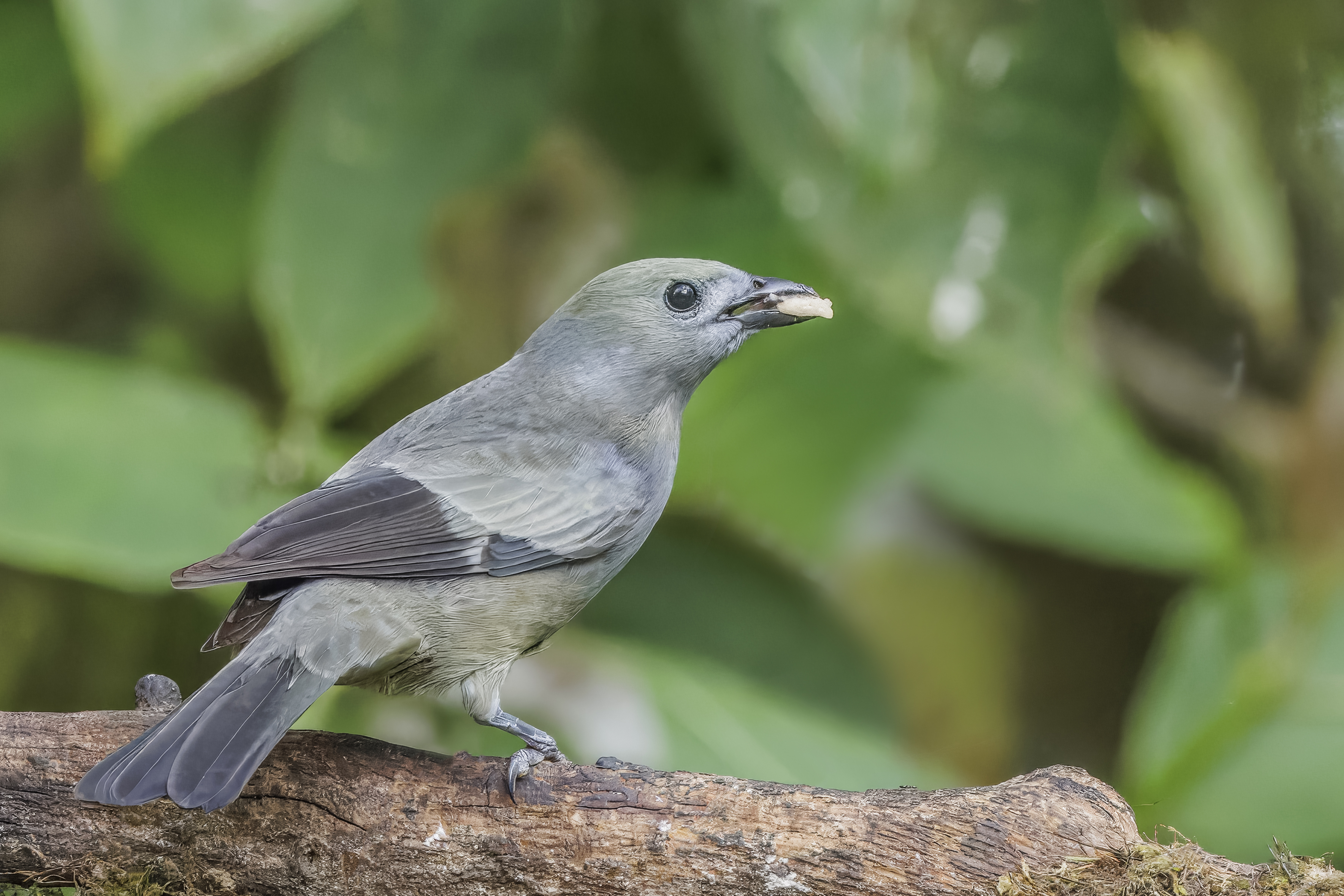
T. p. violilavata, Ecuador

== Range and habitat ==
It occurs in semi-open areas including cultivation and gardens. The bulky cup nest is built in a tree, usually a palm, or under the eaves of a house, and the female incubates three, sometimes two, brown-blotched cream eggs for 14 days, with another 17 days to fledging.

== Behavior ==
Palm tanagers are social, restless but unwary birds which eat a wide variety of small fruit. They also regularly take some nectar, flower petals, and insects, including caterpillars. The song is fast and squeaky.
