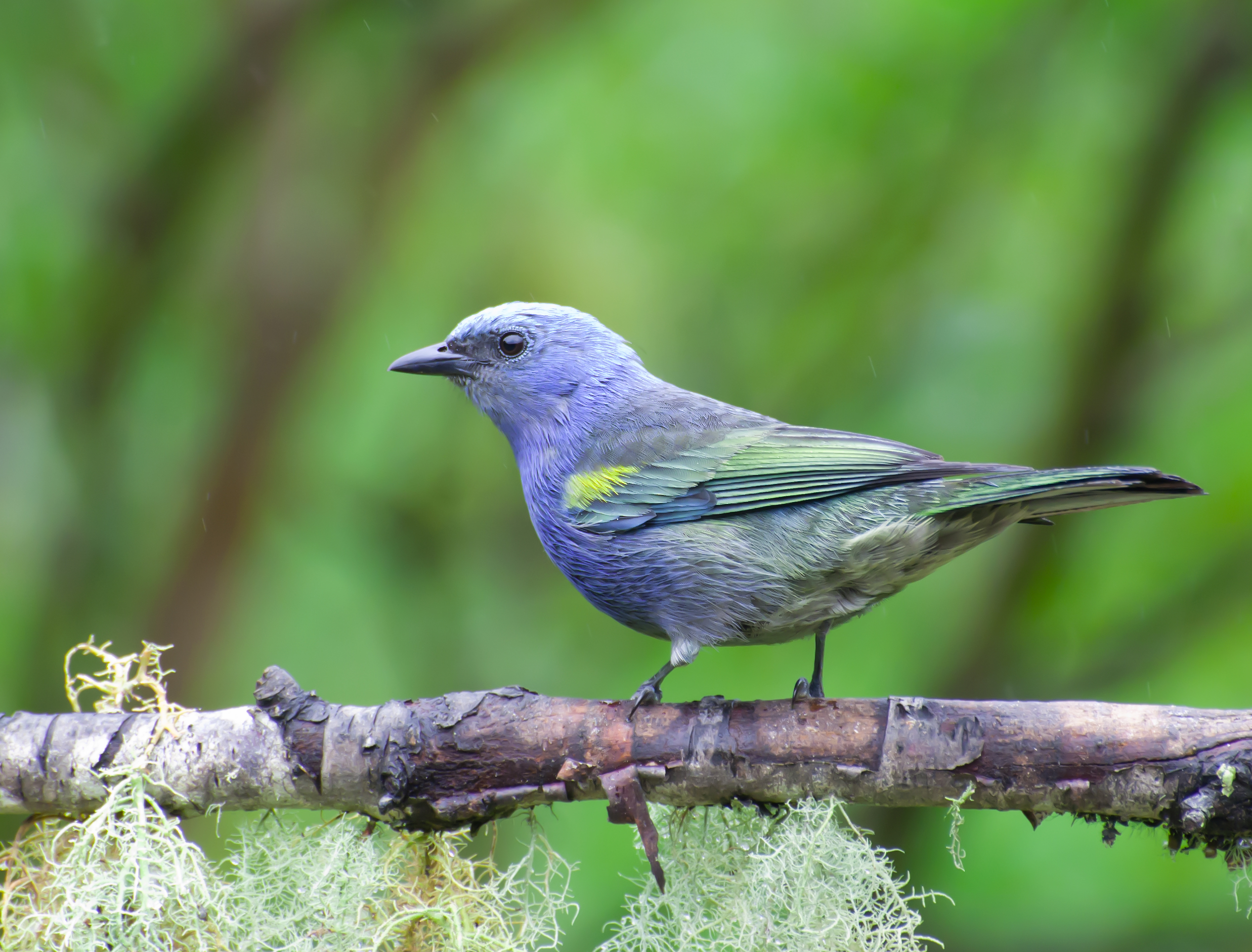
- In Reserva Guainumbi, São Luis do Paraitinga, São Paulo, Brazil

Conservation status
- Least Concern (IUCN 3.1)

Scientific classification
- Kingdom: Animalia
- Phylum: Chordata
- Class: Aves
- Order: Passeriformes
- Family: Thraupidae
- Genus: Thraupis
- Species: T. ornata

Binomial name
- Thraupis ornata (Sparrman, 1789)

Synonyms
- Tangara ornata

= Golden-chevroned tanager =

Species of bird

The golden-chevroned tanager (Thraupis ornata) is a species of bird in the family Thraupidae. It is endemic to Brazil.

Its natural habitats are subtropical or tropical moist lowland forest, subtropical or tropical moist montane forest, and heavily degraded former forest.
