= Projeto TAMAR =

Brazilian non-profit organisation aiming to protect sea turtles

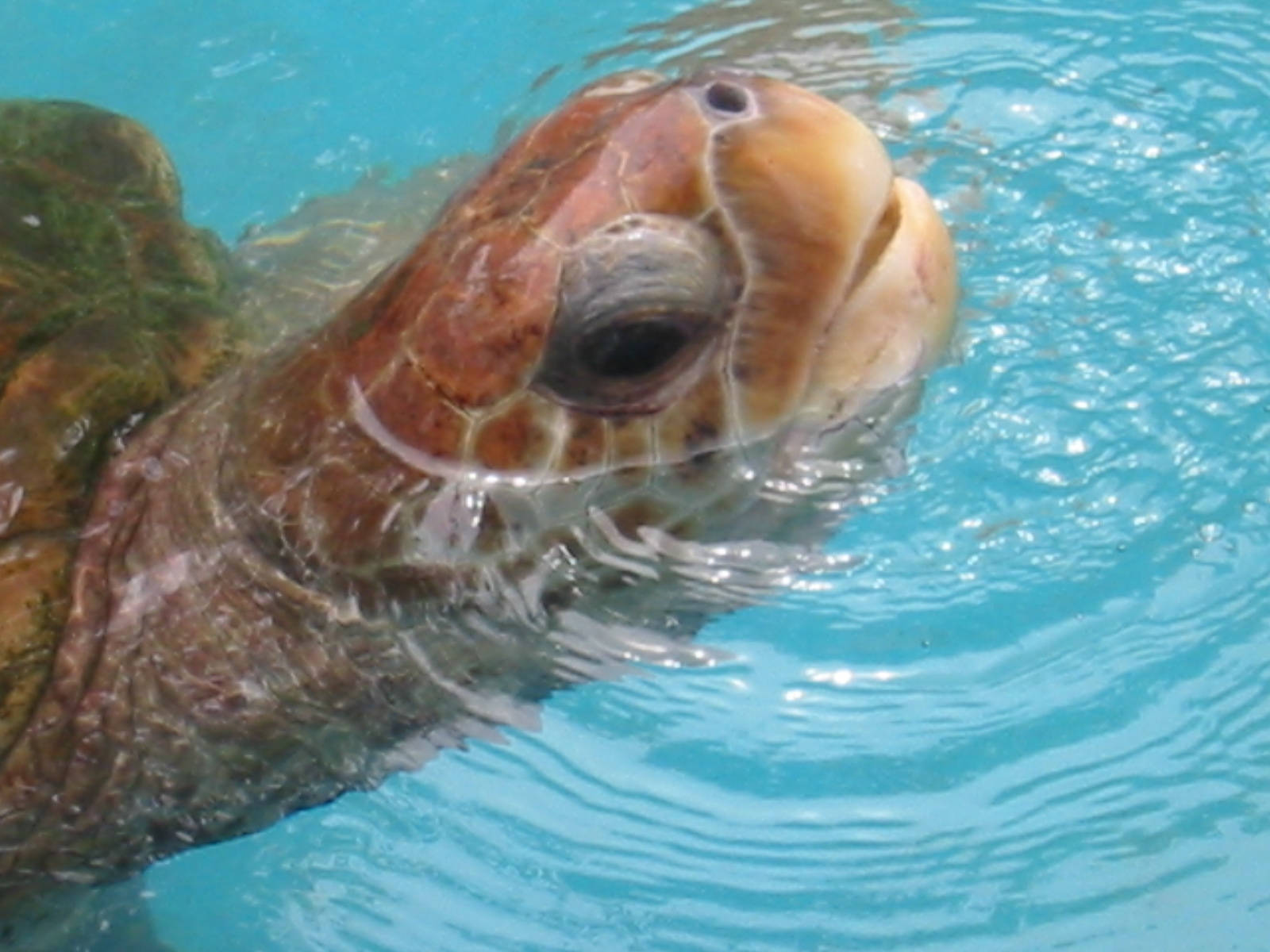
Sea Turtle at Praia do Forte, Bahia, Brazil.

The Projeto TAMAR (Portuguese for TAMAR Project, with TAMAR being an abbreviation of Tartarugas Marinhas, the Sea Turtles) is a Brazilian non-profit organization owned by the Chico Mendes Institute for Biodiversity Conservation. The main objective of the project is to protect sea turtles from extinction in the Brazilian coastline.

== History ==
The TAMAR project was officially created in 1980. The first activities were not centered on the preservation of the turtles, but on the identification of them, their spawn sites and seasons, and the main problems caused by poaching. When the first preservation actions began, TAMAR took the first Brazilian pictures of a sea turtle spawning.

In 1983, the oceanographers searched for Petrobras, to ask for support on the project. The company analyzed all the actions of the project and decided to support it, by providing fuel to their jeeps.

By 2008, TAMAR managed to release more than 8 million turtles in the sea.

== Objective ==
Although the initial purpose was to protect sea turtles only, the project grew and became concerned with sharks and all the sea wildlife, as they are part of the environment in which the sea turtles live. All actions by the project intend to preserve wildlife, concern people about environment, and create sustainable places for the procreation of the species protected by TAMAR.

== Bases ==
There are currently 22 bases of the project, spread all over the country coastline, covering a range of more than 1000 kilometers.

- Rio Grande do Norte
  - Atol das Rocas
  - Pipa
- Pernambuco
  - Fernando de Noronha
- Sergipe
  - Ponta dos Mangues – Pacatuba
  - Pirambu
  - Oceanário – Aracaju,
  - Abais – Itaporanga d'Ajuda
- Bahia
  - Ponta dos Mangues - Jandaíra
  - Sítio do Conde – Salvador
  - Costa do sauípe - Salvador
  - Praia do Forte – Salvador
  - Arembepe - Salvador
- Espírito Santo
  - Itaúnas – Conceição da Barra,
  - Guiriri – São Mateus
  - Pontal do Ipiranga/Povoação – Linhares
  - Regência - Linhares (Comboios Biological Reserve)
  - Trindade - Linhares
  - Vitória
  - Anchieta
- Rio de Janeiro
  - Bacia de Campos – Campos dos Goytacazes
- São Paulo
  - Ubatuba
- Santa Catarina
  - Florianópolis
