= Linhares Regional Airport =

Antônio Edson de Azevedo Lima Regional Airport Aeroporto Regional Antônio Edson de Azevedo Lima

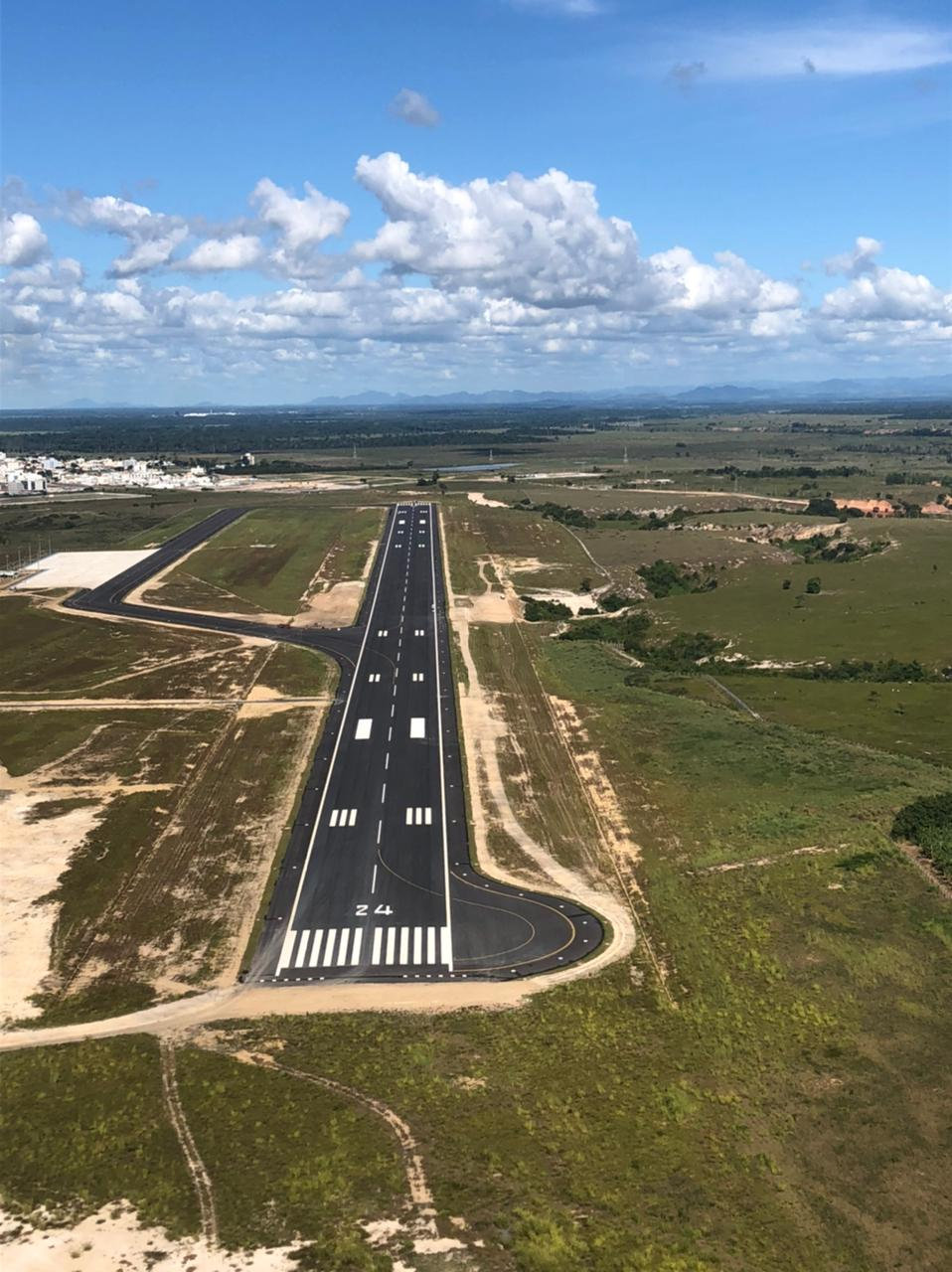
- IATA: LHN; ICAO: SNLN; LID: ES0002

Summary
- Airport type: Public
- Operator: Infraero (2023–present)
- Serves: Linhares
- Time zone: BRT (UTC−03:00)
- Elevation AMSL: 42 m (138 ft)
- Coordinates: 19°21′19″S 040°04′17″W
- Website: www4.infraero.gov.br/aeroporto-linhares/

Map
- Location in Brazil

Runways
Direction	Length		Surface
Direction	m	ft	Surface
06/24	1,860	6,102	Asphalt

Statistics (2025)
- Passengers: 3,950 ▼25%
- Aircraft operations: 1,595 ▲7%
- Metric tonnes of cargo: 14 ▼52%
- Statistics: Infraero; Sources: Airport Website, ANAC, DECEA

Antônio Edson de Azevedo Lima Regional Airport (IATA: LHN, ICAO: SNLN), is the airport serving Linhares, Brazil.

It is managed by contract by Infraero.

== History ==
Major renovation works were completed on April 14, 2023, which included extension of the runway and rebuilding of the terminal building.

On August 24, 2023, the Municipality of Linhares signed a contract of operation with Infraero.

== Airlines and destinations ==
Airlines	Destinations
Azul Conecta	Belo Horizonte–Confins

== Access ==
The airport is located 5 km (3 mi) from downtown Linhares.

== See also ==
- List of airports in Brazil
