= Vila Valério =

Coordinates: 18°59′52″S 40°23′20″W

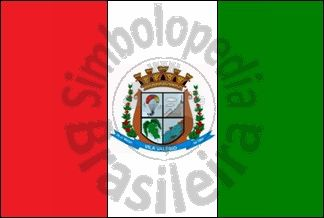
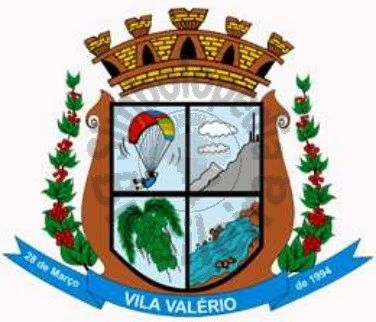
- Flag Coat of arms

- Established: 25 March 1994

Area
  - Total: 464.351 km^{2} (179.287 sq mi)

Population (2020)
  - Total: 14,073
  - Density: 30/km^{2} (78/sq mi)

Vila Valério is a municipality located in the Brazilian state of Espírito Santo. Its population was 14,073 (2020) and its area is 464 km^{2}.

The municipality contains part of the 27,858 hectares (68,840 acres) Sooretama Biological Reserve, a strictly protected conservation unit created in 1982 when two earlier units were merged.

== See also ==
- List of municipalities in Espírito Santo
