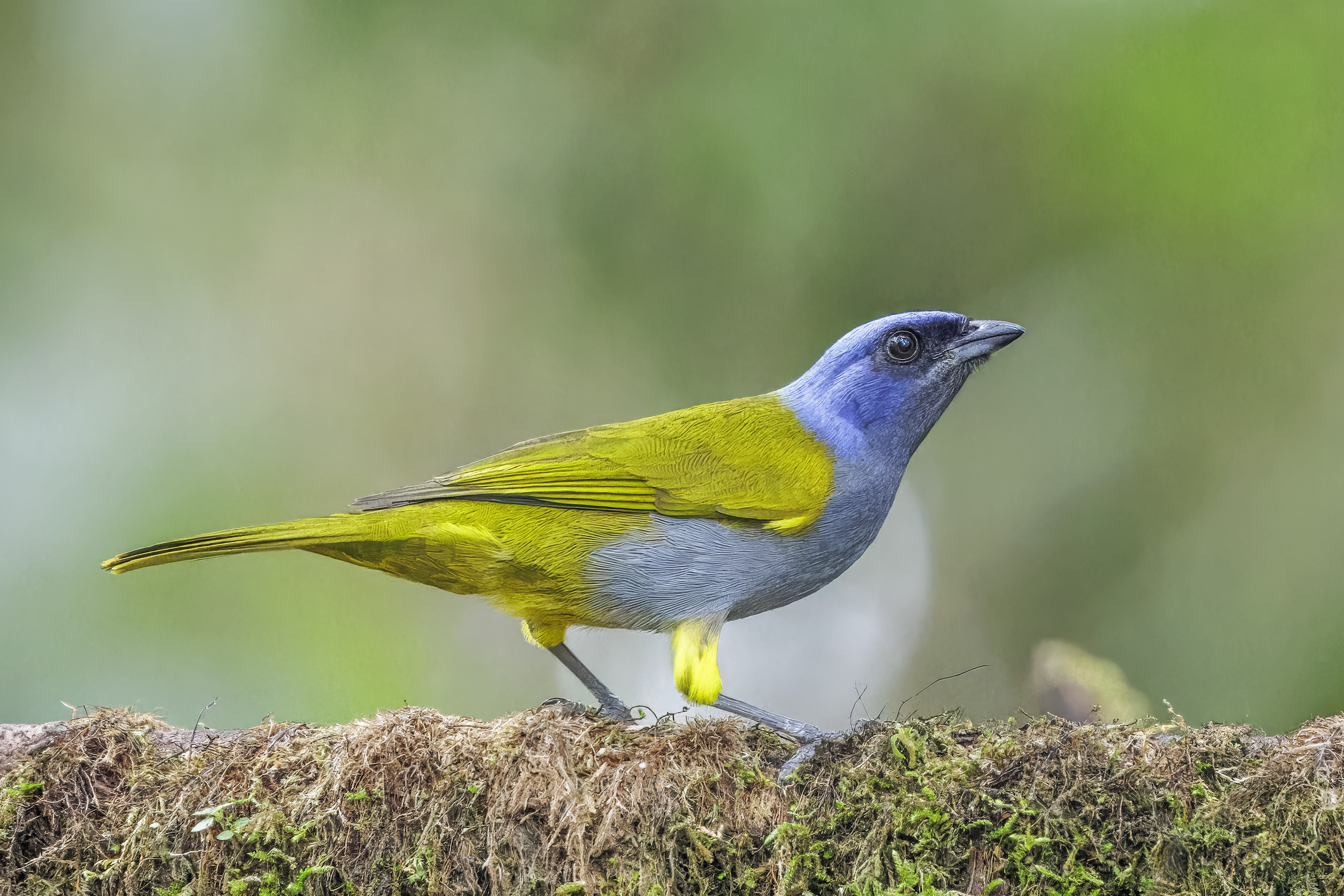
- Sporathraupis cyanocephala cyanocephala in Ecuador
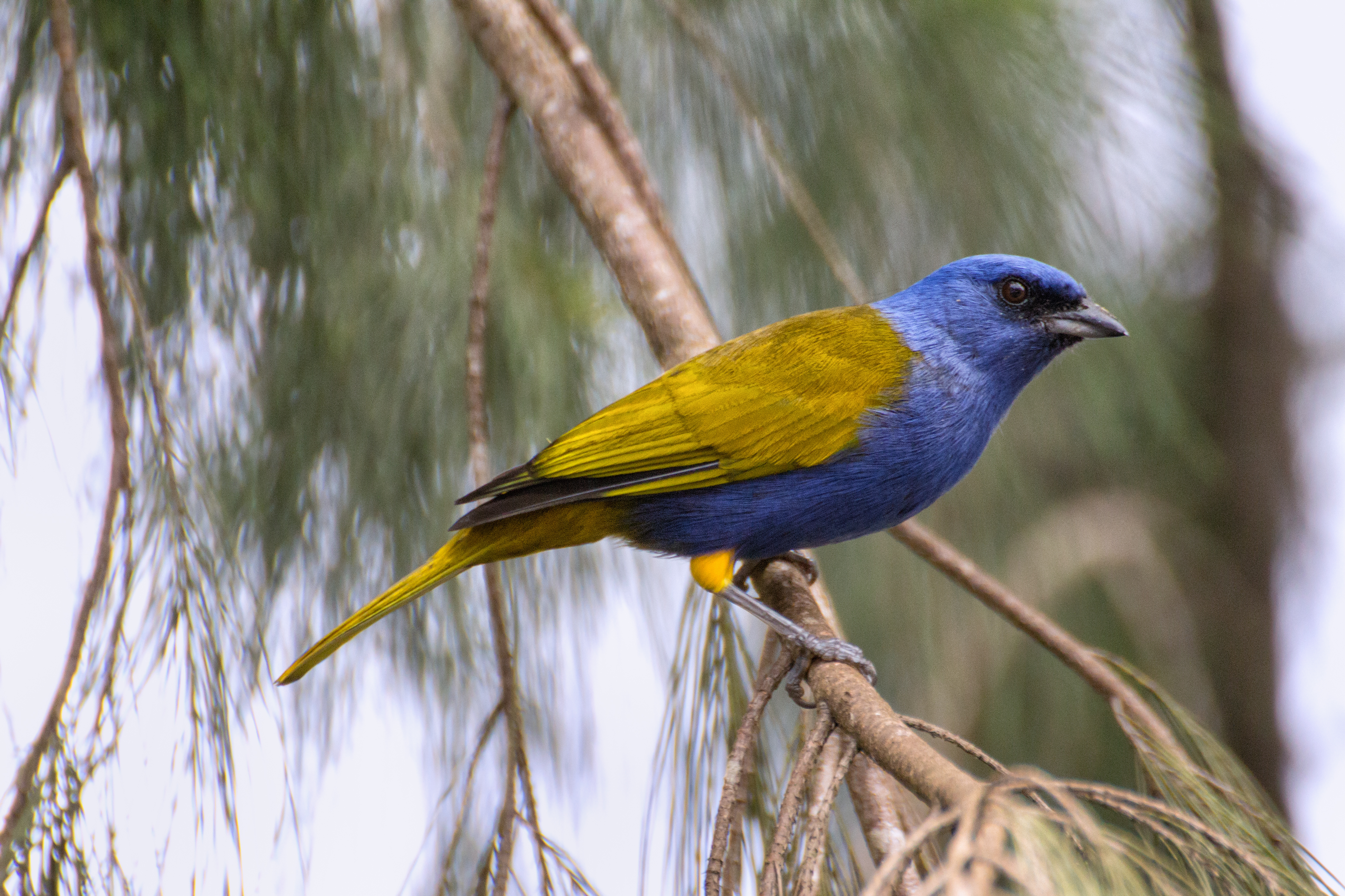
- In El Ávila National Park, Caracas, Venezuela

Conservation status
- Least Concern (IUCN 3.1)

Scientific classification
- Kingdom: Animalia
- Phylum: Chordata
- Class: Aves
- Order: Passeriformes
- Family: Thraupidae
- Genus: Sporathraupis; Ridgway, 1898
- Species: S. cyanocephala

Binomial name
- Sporathraupis cyanocephala (D'Orbigny & Lafresnaye, 1837)

Synonyms
- Aglaia cyanocephala (protonym); Thraupis cyanocephala

= Blue-capped tanager =

Species of bird

The blue-capped tanager (Sporathraupis cyanocephala) is a species of bird in the tanager family Thraupidae. It was formerly placed in the genus Thraupis but is now the only species in the genus Sporathraupis.

It is found in Bolivia, Colombia, Ecuador, Peru, Trinidad and Tobago, and Venezuela. Its natural habitats are subtropical or tropical moist montane forests and heavily degraded former forest.

== Taxonomy ==
The blue-capped tanager was formally described in 1837 by the French naturalists Alcide d'Orbigny and Frédéric de Lafresnaye from a specimen collected in the Bolivian Yungas. They coined the binomial name Aglaia cyanocephala. The species was usually placed in the genus Thraupis but when a molecular phylogenetic study published in 2014 found that it was not closely related to other members of Thraupis, it was moved to the resurrected genus Sporathraupis that had been erected in 1898 by Robert Ridgway with the blue-capped tanager as the type species. The genus name Sporathraupis combines the Ancient Greek spora meaning "seed" with thraupis, the word for an unknown small bird. The specific epithet combines the Ancient Greek kuanos meaning "dark blue" with -kephalos meaning "-headed".

Eight subspecies are recognised:

- Sporathraupis cyanocephala cyanocephala (d'Orbigny & Lafresnaye, 1837) – Ecuador, Peru and north Bolivia
- Sporathraupis cyanocephala annectens (Zimmer, JT, 1944) – central, west Colombia
- Sporathraupis cyanocephala auricrissa (Sclater, PL, 1856) – northeast Colombia and northwest Venezuela
- Sporathraupis cyanocephala margaritae Chapman, 1912 – north Colombia
- Sporathraupis cyanocephala hypophaea Todd, 1917 – northwest to north-central Venezuela
- Sporathraupis cyanocephala olivicyanea (Lafresnaye, 1843) – north-central Venezuela
- Sporathraupis cyanocephala subcinerea (Sclater, PL, 1861) – north-central to northeast Venezuela
- Sporathraupis cyanocephala buesingi Hellmayr & Seilern, 1913 – extreme northeast Venezuela and Trinidad
