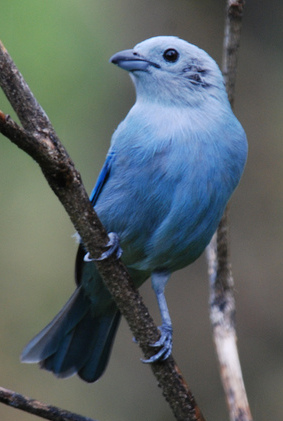
- Blue-grey tanager

Scientific classification
- Kingdom: Animalia
- Phylum: Chordata
- Class: Aves
- Order: Passeriformes
- Family: Thraupidae
- Genus: Thraupis; F. Boie, 1826

Type species
- Tanagra ornata Sparrman, 1789

Species
- See text

= Thraupis =

Genus of birds

Thraupis is a genus of birds of the tanager family occurring from Mexico to Argentina and Brazil. Some are familiar species with large ranges. In Brazil it's called Pipira-azul (pronn: peepeeră, æzoól) when it has a tone blue color, when it has green tone color is called "Pipira-verde" or "Pipira-Vierde" on mexico.

These tanagers are mainly found in semi-open habitats including plantations and open woodland, but some will venture into towns. They feed from medium to high levels in trees, taking mainly fruit, with some nectar, and insects which may be taken in flight. The pair builds a usually well concealed cup nest, but the female incubates alone. The blue-gray and palm tanagers will nest in buildings. Thraupis tanagers have squeaky call notes and songs which consist of 5-10 repetitions of a single or double note.

== Taxonomy and species list ==
The genus was introduced by the German naturalist Friedrich Boie in 1826 with the golden-chevroned tanager as the type species. The name of the genus is the Ancient Greek word for an unidentified small bird mentioned by Aristotle.

The genus formerly included the blue-and-yellow tanager and the blue-capped tanager. These were moved to other genera based on the results of molecular phylogenetic studies.

The genus contains the following seven species.

Image	Scientific name	Common name	Distribution
	Thraupis episcopus	Blue-grey tanager	Mexico south to northeast Bolivia and northern Brazil, all of the Amazon Basin
	Thraupis sayaca	Sayaca tanager	Brazil and Bolivia, Paraguay, Uruguay, and northeastern Argentina
	Thraupis glaucocolpa	Glaucous tanager	Colombia and Venezuela
	Thraupis cyanoptera	Azure-shouldered tanager	Brazil
	Thraupis abbas	Yellow-winged tanager	Gulf of Mexico and Caribbean coasts from the states of Veracruz and the extreme south of San Luis Potosí in Mexico through the Yucatán Peninsula to Nicaragua, and on the Pacific coast from the Mexican state of Chiapas to Honduras
	Thraupis ornata	Golden-chevroned tanager	Brazil
	Thraupis palmarum	Palm tanager	Nicaragua south to Bolivia, Paraguay and southern Brazil
