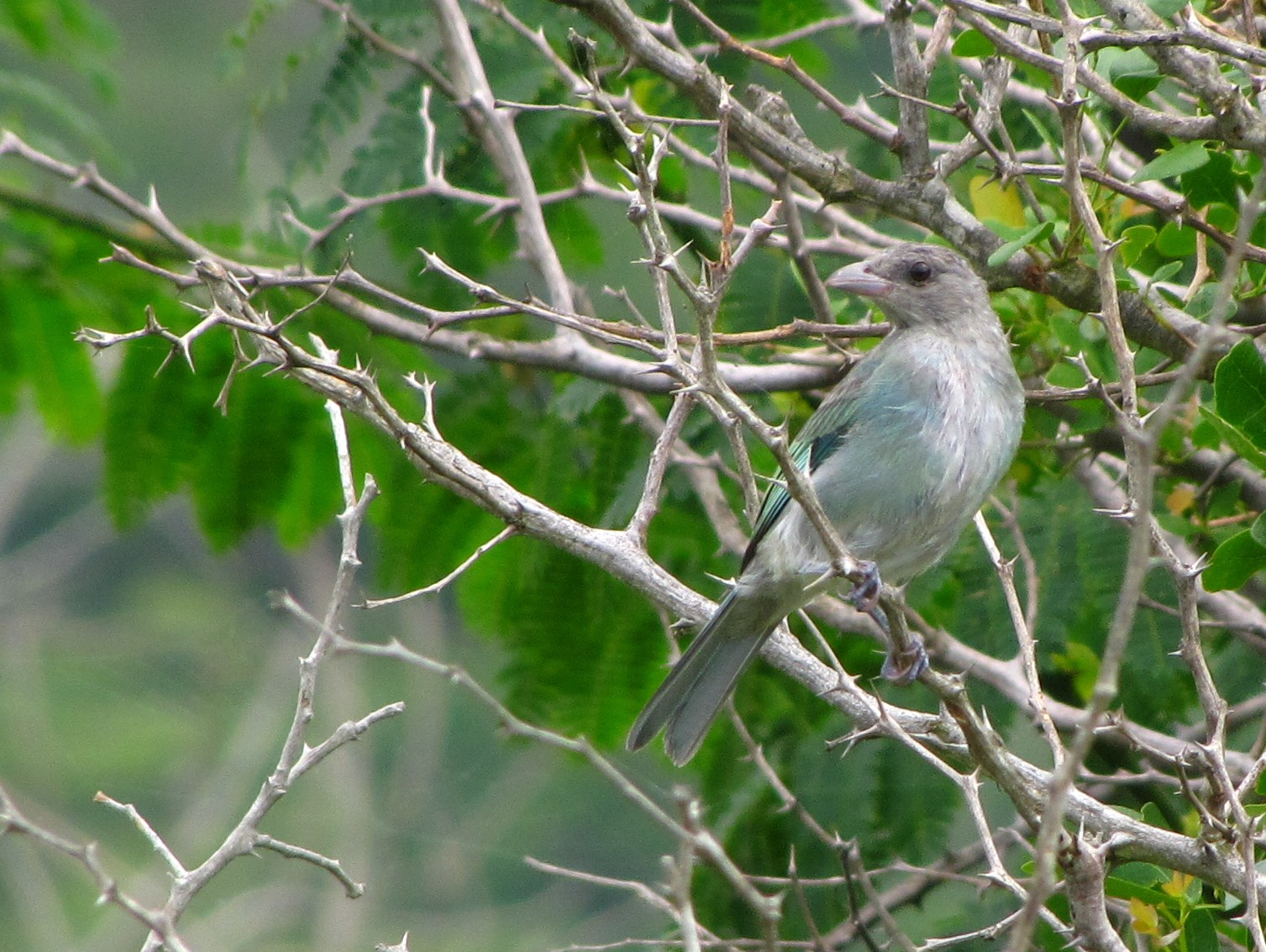

Conservation status
- Least Concern (IUCN 3.1)

Scientific classification
- Kingdom: Animalia
- Phylum: Chordata
- Class: Aves
- Order: Passeriformes
- Family: Thraupidae
- Genus: Thraupis
- Species: T. glaucocolpa

Binomial name
- Thraupis glaucocolpa Cabanis, 1851

Synonyms
- Tangara glaucocolpa

= Glaucous tanager =

Species of bird

The glaucous tanager (Thraupis glaucocolpa) is a species of bird in the family Thraupidae. The term glaucous describes its colouration. It is found in Colombia and Venezuela. Its natural habitats are subtropical or tropical moist lowland forests and heavily degraded former forest.
