= Rio Bananal =

Municipality in Espírito Santo, Brazil

- Municipality of Espírito Santo, Brazil
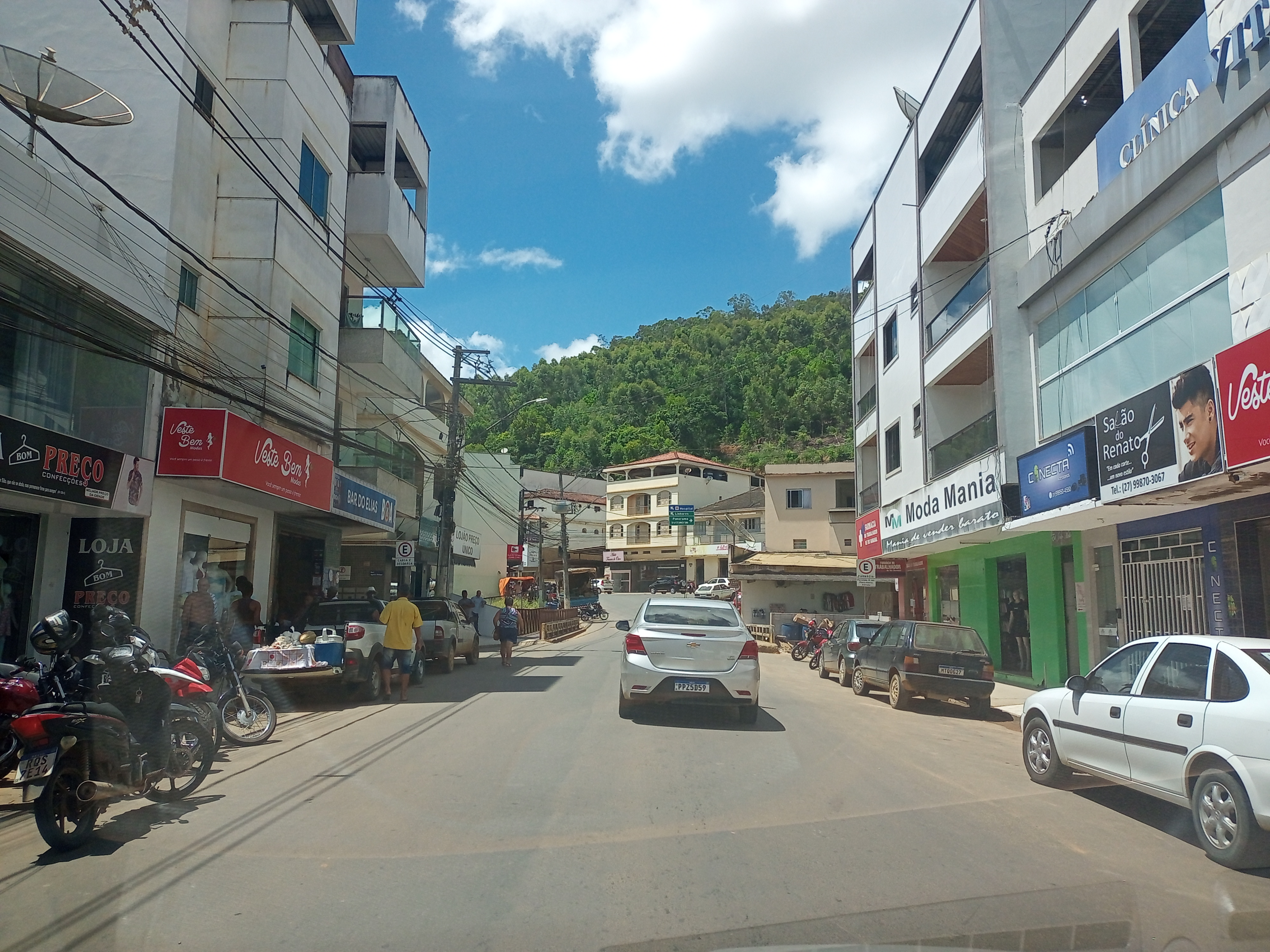
- Guerino Ceolim Avenue

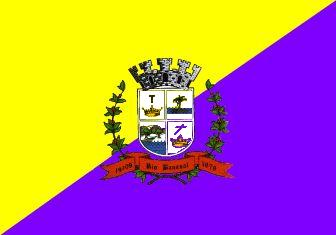
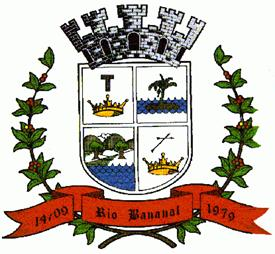
- Flag Coat of arms
- Etymology: Named after a river with banana plants growing on its banks
- Location of Rio Bananal in Espírito Santo

- Location within Brazil Location within South America
- Coordinates: 19°15′54″S 40°19′58″W
- Country: Brazil
- Region: Southeast
- State: Espírito Santo
- Founded: 14 September 1979

Government
  - Mayor: Bruno Pella (PODE) (2025-2028)
  - Vice Mayor: Ildomar Torres Gava (PP) (2025-2028)

Area
  - Total: 641.929 km^{2} (247.850 sq mi)
- Elevation: 77 m (253 ft)

Population (2022)
  - Total: 19,274
  - Density: 30.03/km^{2} (77.8/sq mi)
- Demonym: Ribanense (Brazilian Portuguese)
- Time zone: UTC-03:00 (Brasília Time)
- Postal code: 29920-000, 29925-000
- HDI (2010): 0.681 – medium
- Website: riobananal.es.gov.br

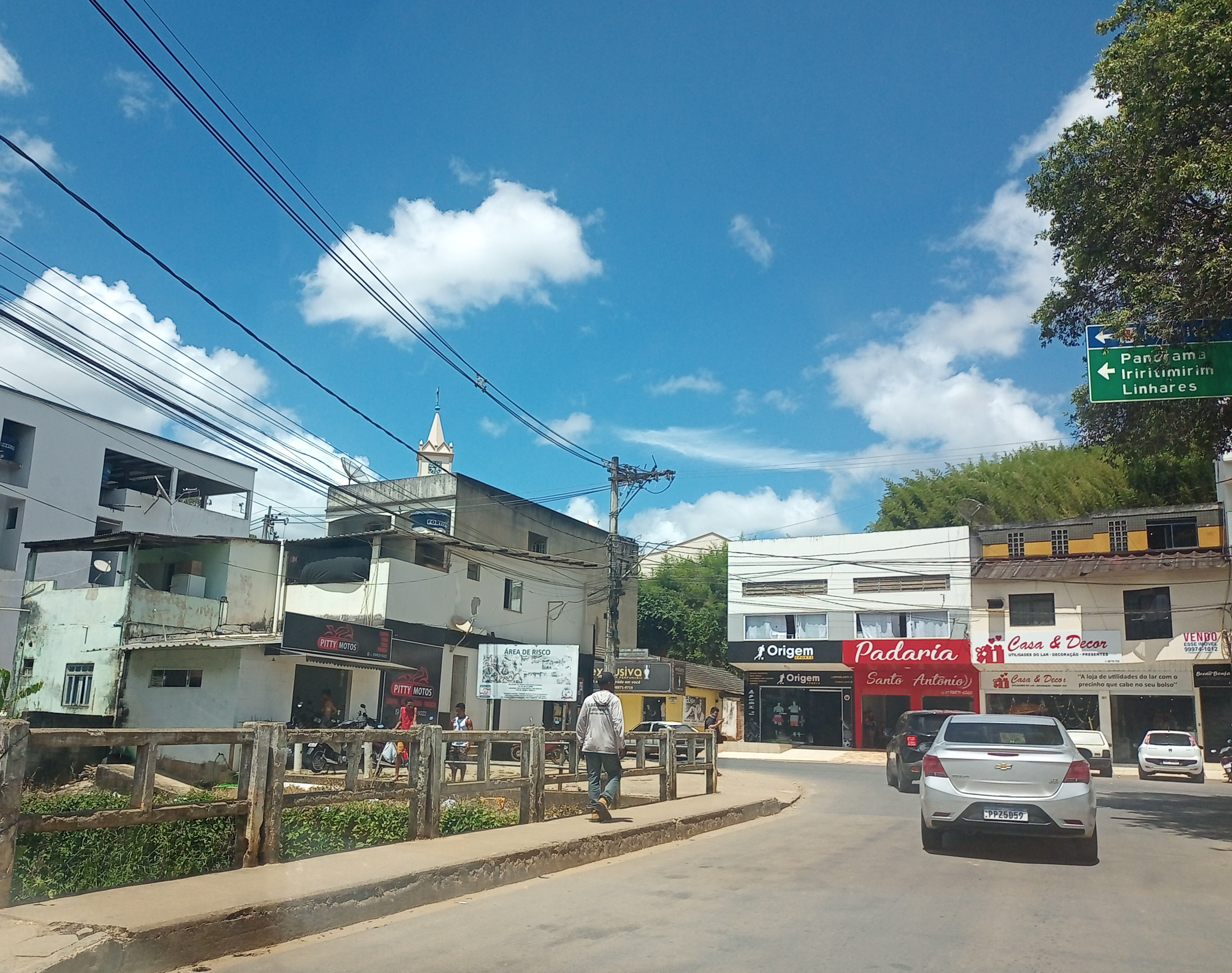
Rio Bananal

Rio Bananal is a municipality located in the Brazilian state of Espírito Santo. Its population was 19,271 (2020) and its area is 642 km^{2}.

== See also ==
- List of municipalities in Espírito Santo
