= Sooretama Biological Reserve =

Forest in Brazil

- Reserva Biológica de Sooretama
- IUCN category Ia (strict nature reserve)
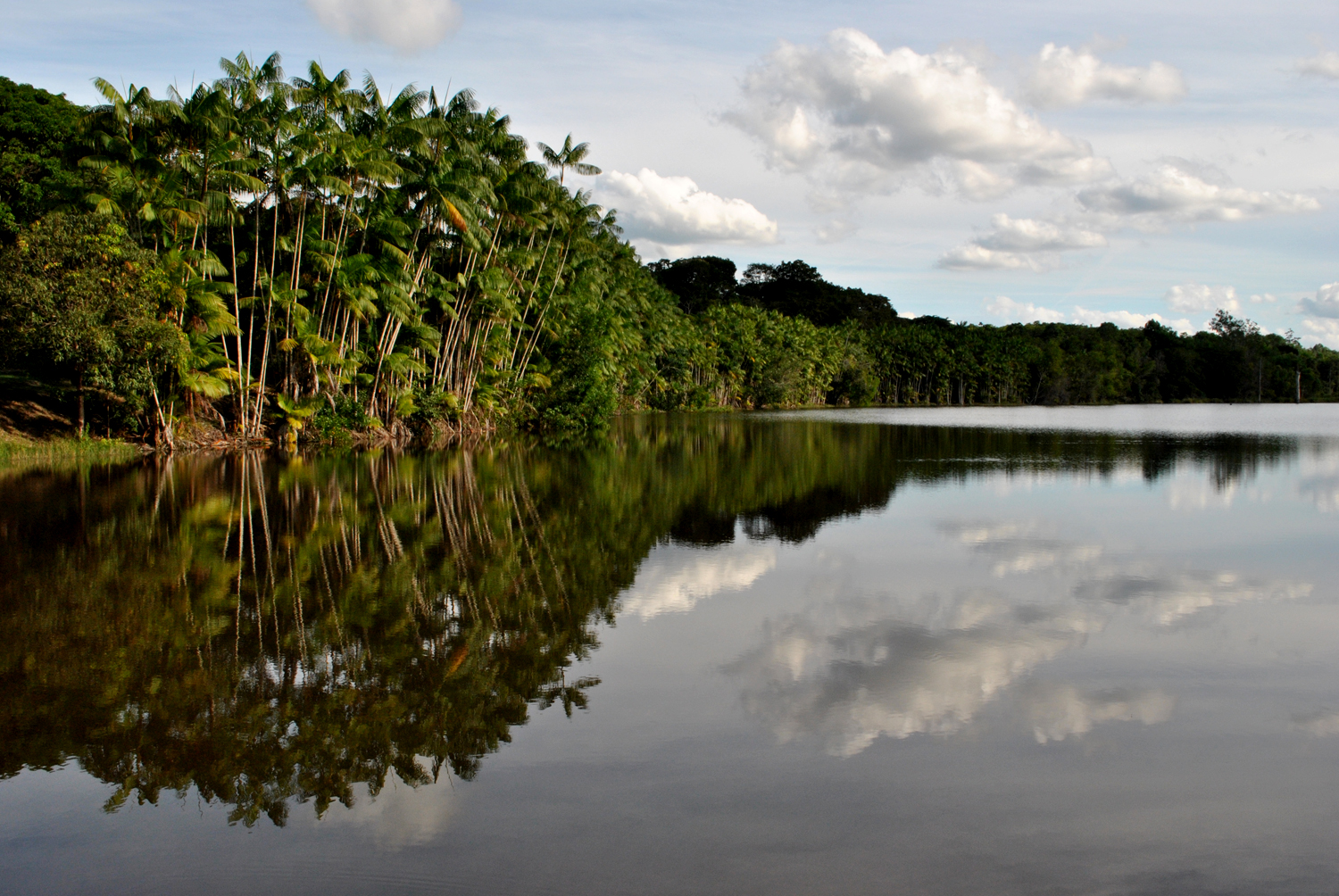
- Reserva natural em Sooretama 2012

- Location within Brazil
- Nearest city: São Mateus, Espírito Santo
- Coordinates: 18°59′13″S 40°06′25″W
- Area: 27,858 hectares (68,840 acres)
- Designation: Biological reserve
- Created: 20 September 1982

Sooretama Biological Reserve (Portuguese: Reserva Biológica de Sooretama is a biological reserve in the state of Espírito Santo, Brazil.

== History ==
The area at present occupied by the reserve consists of two areas; one of 12,250 hectares (30,300 acres) was formerly the Parque de Refugio e Criação de Animais Silvestres Sooretama and another of 10,000 hectares (25,000 acres) was formerly the Parque Estadual Barra Seca of the state of Espirito Santo. These were merged on 20 September 1982 to create the biological reserve. It became part of the Central Atlantic Forest Ecological Corridor, created in 2002.

The reserve covers 27,858 hectares (68,840 acres) of Atlantic Forest. It is administered by the Chico Mendes Institute for Biodiversity Conservation. It covers parts of the municipalities of Jaguaré, Linhares, Vila Valério and Sooretama.

== Status ==
The Biological Reserve is a "strict nature reserve" under IUCN protected area category Ia. Its purpose is to preserve the biota and other natural attributes without human interference. The reserve has a high number of endemic species of fauna, and Atlantic Forest trees over 30 metres (98 ft) high. Tableland Atlantic Forest in Acrisols (Yellow) and Acrisols (Gray) (WRB) or Argissolos Amarelos and Argissolos Acinzentados (SiBCS, Brazil). Includes Vegetal Formation called Mussununga in Podzol (WRB) or Espodossolos (SiBCS, Brazil).

Protected birds include the red-browed amazon (Amazona rhodocorytha), white-necked hawk (Buteogallus lacernulatus), Atlantic black-breasted woodpecker (Celeus tinnunculus), black-headed berryeater (Carpornis melanocephala), yellow-legged tinamou (Crypturellus noctivagus), red-billed curassow (Crax blumenbachii), banded cotinga (Cotinga maculata), band-tailed antwren (Myrmotherula urosticta), scalloped antbird (Myrmeciza ruficauda), rufous-vented ground cuckoo (Neomorphus geoffroyi), golden-green woodpecker (Piculus chrysochloros), white-eared parakeet (Pyrrhura leucotis), ochre-marked parakeet (Pyrrhura cruentata) and striated softtail (Thripophaga macroura).

Other protected species include the northern brown howler (Alouatta guariba guariba), Atlantic titi (Callicebus personatus), giant armadillo (Priodontes maximus), cougar (Puma concolor), jaguar (Panthera onca), oncilla (Leopardus tigrinus), ocelot (Leopardus pardalis), the ant Dinoponera lucida, Hercules beetle (Dynastes hercules) and the Characiformes fish Rachoviscus graciliceps.

== Sources ==
- Lamas, Ivana Reis; Crepaldi, Maria Otávia; Mesquita, Carlos Alberto Bernardo (2015), Uma Rede no Corredor (PDF) (in Portuguese), Conservação Internacional (CI-Brasil), ISBN 978-85-98830-28-5
- Rebio de Sooretama (in Portuguese), Chico Mendes Institute for Biodiversity Conservation
- Reserva Biológica de Sooretama (in Portuguese), ICMBio
- Unidade de Conservação: Reserva Biológica de Sooretama (in Portuguese), MMA: Ministério do Meio Ambiente
