= Buchenavia pabstii =

Conservation status
- Endangered (IUCN 2.3)

Scientific classification
- Kingdom: Plantae
- Clade: Tracheophytes
- Clade: Angiosperms
- Clade: Eudicots
- Clade: Rosids
- Order: Myrtales
- Family: Combretaceae
- Genus: Buchenavia
- Species: B. pabstii

Binomial name
- Buchenavia pabstii Marquete & C.Valente

Species of flowering plant

Buchenavia pabstii is a species of flowering plant in the Combretaceae family. It is a tree endemic to southeastern Brazil.

In 2017 genus Buchenavia was synonymized with Terminalia. The new combination for Buchenavia pabstii was never published, so the species is unplaced.
