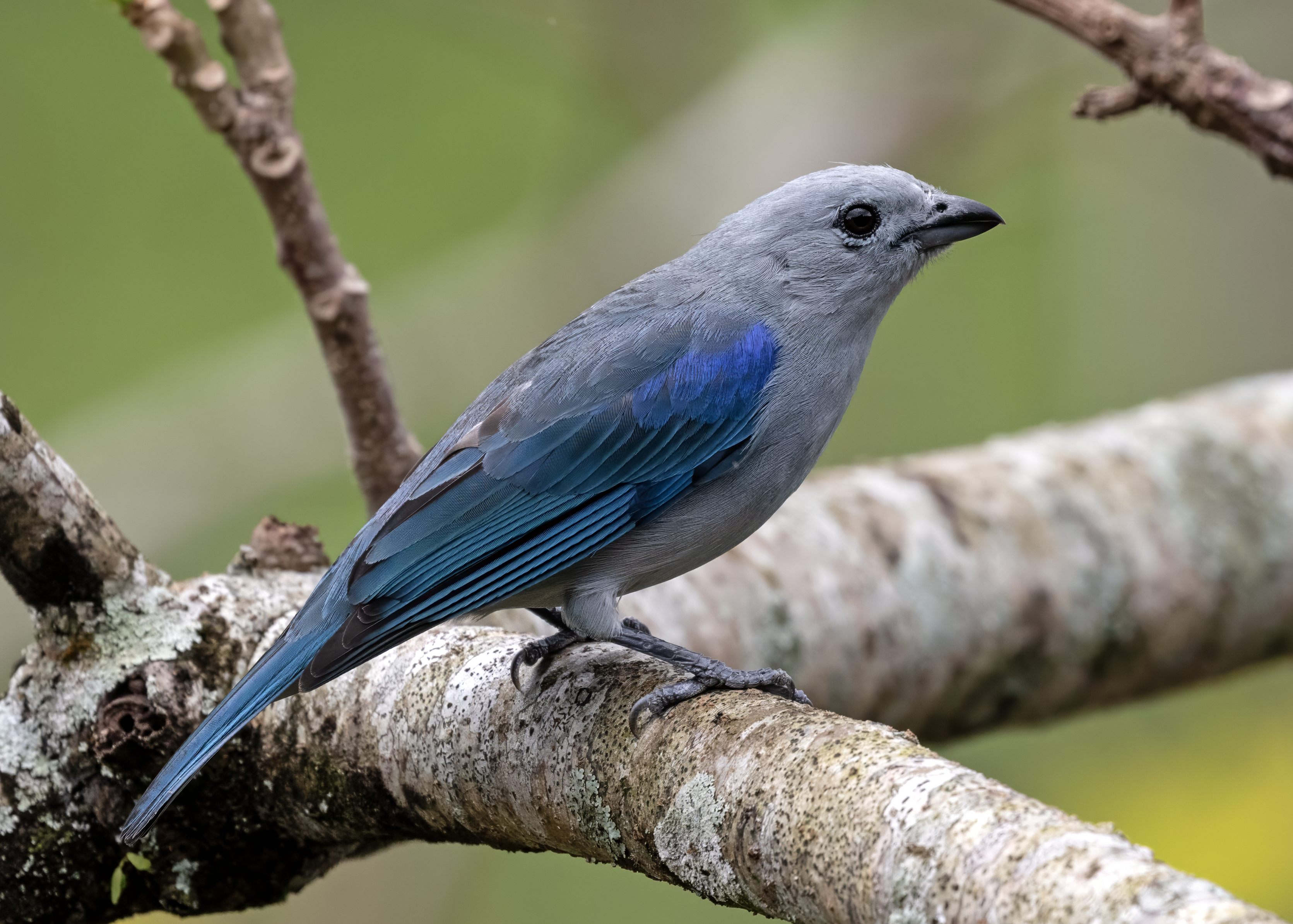
- A blue-gray tanager in San Miguel, Alajuela, Costa Rica

Conservation status
- Least Concern (IUCN 3.1)

Scientific classification
- Kingdom: Animalia
- Phylum: Chordata
- Class: Aves
- Order: Passeriformes
- Family: Thraupidae
- Genus: Thraupis
- Species: T. episcopus

Binomial name
- Thraupis episcopus (Linnaeus, 1766)

Synonyms
- Loxia virens Linnaeus, 1766; Tanagra episcopus Linnaeus, 1766; Tangara episcopus (Linnaeus, 1766)

= Blue-gray tanager =

Species of bird

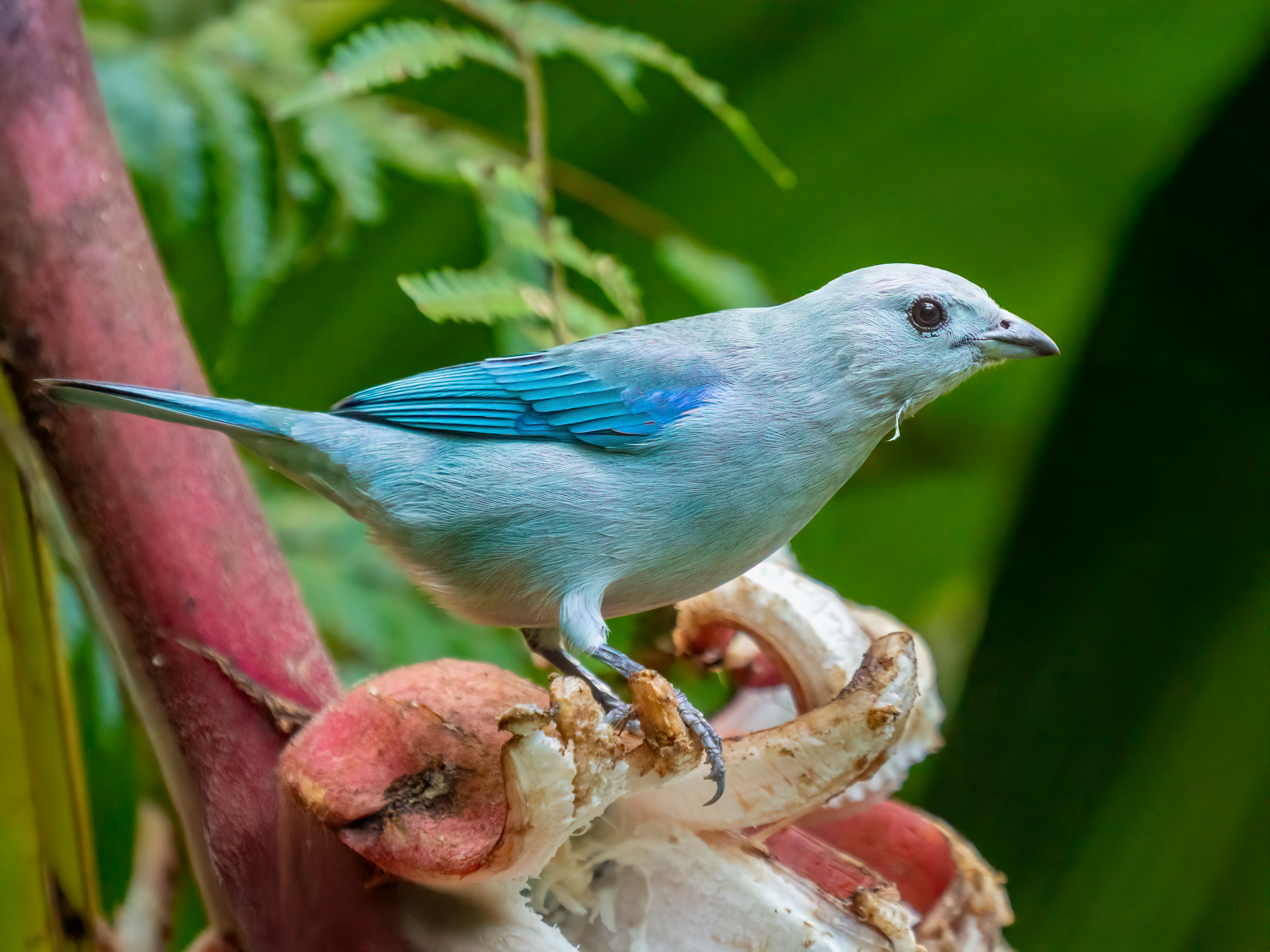
Blue-gray tanager on an ornamental banana

The blue-gray tanager (Thraupis episcopus) is a medium-sized South American songbird of the tanager family, Thraupidae. Its range is from Mexico south to northeast Bolivia and northern Brazil, all of the Amazon Basin, except the very south. It has been introduced to Lima (Peru) and Florida (United States). On Trinidad and Tobago, this bird is called blue jean.

== Taxonomy ==
In 1760 the French zoologist Mathurin Jacques Brisson included a description of the blue-gray tanager in his Ornithologie based on a specimen collected in Brazil. He used the French name L'evesque and the Latin name Episcopus avis. Although Brisson coined Latin names, these do not conform to the binomial system and are not recognized by the International Commission on Zoological Nomenclature. When in 1766 the Swedish naturalist Carl Linnaeus updated his Systema Naturae for the twelfth edition, he added 240 species that had been previously described by Brisson in his Ornithologie. One of these was the blue-gray tanager. Linnaeus included a terse description, coined the binomial name Tanagra episcopus, and cited Brisson's work. The specific name episcopus is Latin for "bishop". It was placed in the genus Thraupis by the German naturalist Friedrich Boie in 1826. It was placed back in the genus Tangara (bird) in 2016.

There are 14 recognized subspecies, differing according to the exact hue of blue of the shoulder patch versus the rest of the plumage; they may be grayish, greenish, or purplish-blue, with a lavender, dark blue, or whitish shoulder patch. For example, T. e. berlepschi (endemic to Tobago) is a brighter and darker blue on the rump and shoulder; T. e. neosophilus with a violet shoulder patch occurs in northern Venezuela, Trinidad, eastern Colombia, and the far north of Brazil; T. e. mediana of the southern Amazon basin has a white wing patch; and T. e. cana in the northern Amazon has blue shoulders.

== Description ==
The blue-gray tanager is 16–18 cm (6.3–7.1 in) long and weighs 30–40 g (1.1–1.4 oz). Adults have a light bluish head and underparts, with darker blue upperparts and a shoulder patch colored a different shade of blue. The bill is short and quite thick. Sexes are similar, but the immature is much duller in plumage.

The song is a squeaky twittering, interspersed with tseee and tsuup call notes.

== Breeding and habitat ==
The breeding habitat is open woodland, cultivated areas, and gardens. The blue-gray tanager lives mainly on fruit, but will also take some nectar, insects, and other arthropods. This is a common, restless, noisy, and confiding species, usually found in pairs, but sometimes small groups. It thrives around human habitation, and will take some cultivated fruit like papayas (Carica papaya).

One to three, usually two, dark-marked whitish to gray-green eggs are laid in a deep cup nest in a high tree fork or building crevice. Incubation by the female is 14 days with another 17 to fledging. The nest is sometimes parasitised by Molothrus cowbirds.

Two birds studied in the Parque Nacional de La Macarena of Colombia were infected with microfilariae, an undetermined Trypanosoma species, and another blood parasite that could not be identified. Two other birds, examined near Turbo (also in Colombia), did not have blood parasites.

== Agricultural ecology ==
T. episcopus prospers in some areas cleared by humans for grazing, but is not as attracted to buildings or high human or livestock activity. They continue to live in forests but eagerly move temporarily into abandoned pasture land for wild fruits and have been variously found to never forage or merely to forage less often in pasture that has livestock in it. T. episcopus is more common in secondary forest resulting from slash-and-burn followed by abandonment than in primary forest.

T. episcopus is commonly infected with Blastocystis parasites, specifically Subtype 6 (ST6) which was exclusive to birds in that area. ST6 was never found in cows in the area, but it was unassessed whether T. episcopus shares ST6 with nearby domesticated bird flocks.

== Status ==
Widespread and common throughout its large range, the blue-gray tanager is evaluated as Least Concern on the IUCN Red List of Threatened Species.

== Subspecies ==
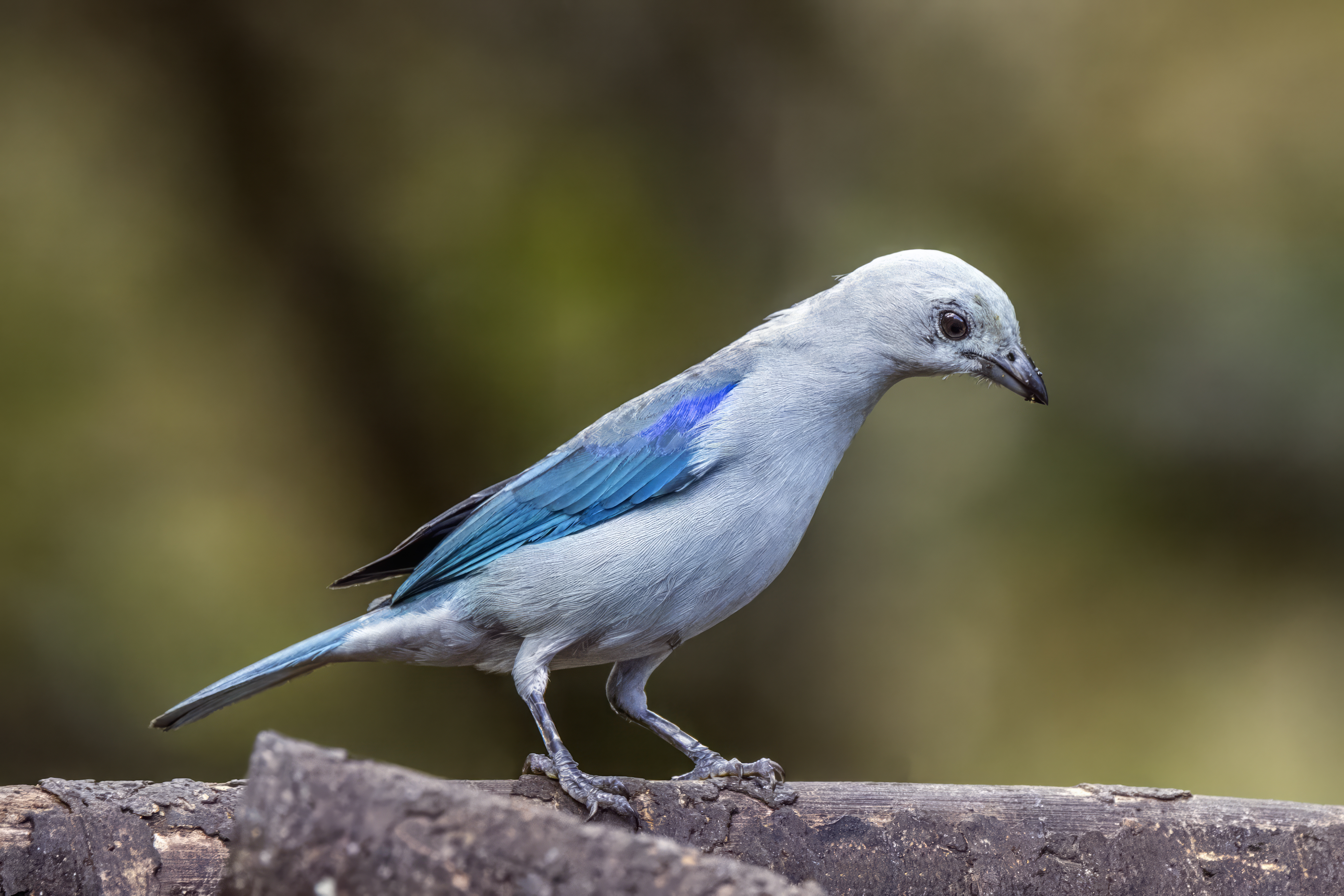
T. e. quaesita
Colombia

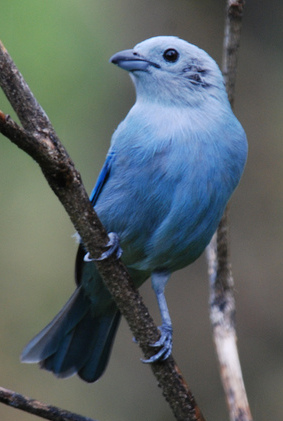
T. e. nesophila
Trinidad

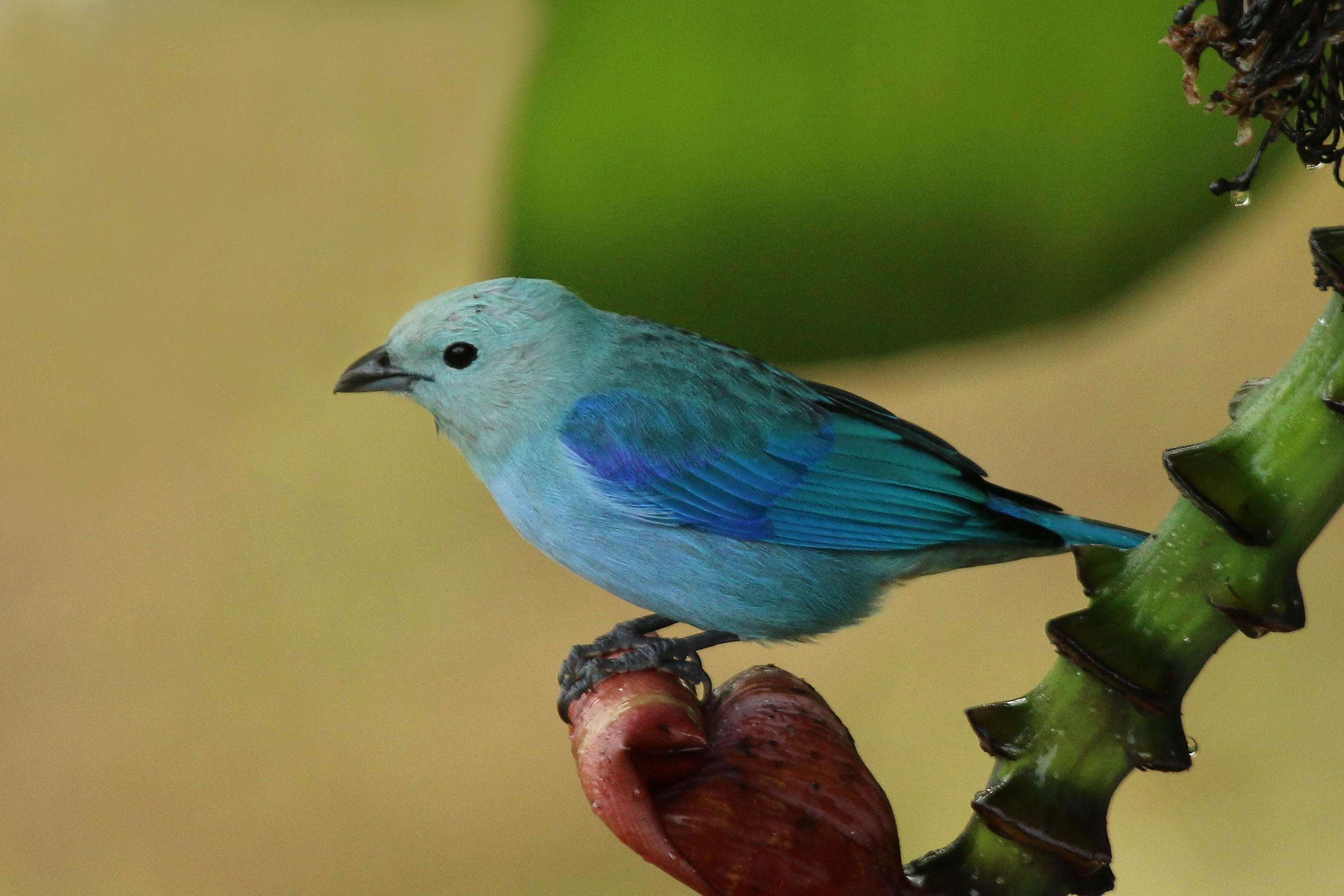
T. e. berlepschi
Tobago
