= Sooretama =

- Municipality
- Município de Sooretama
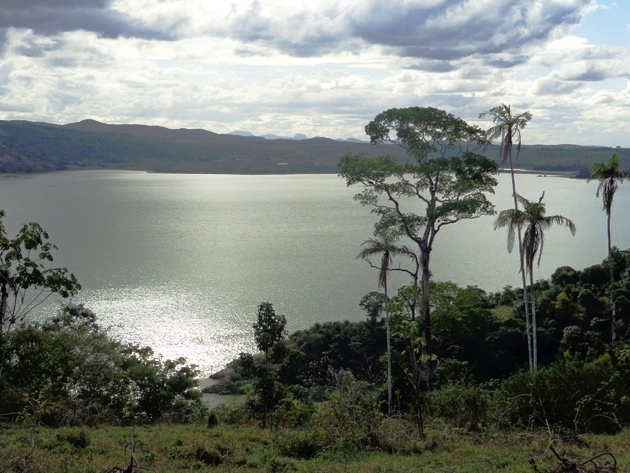

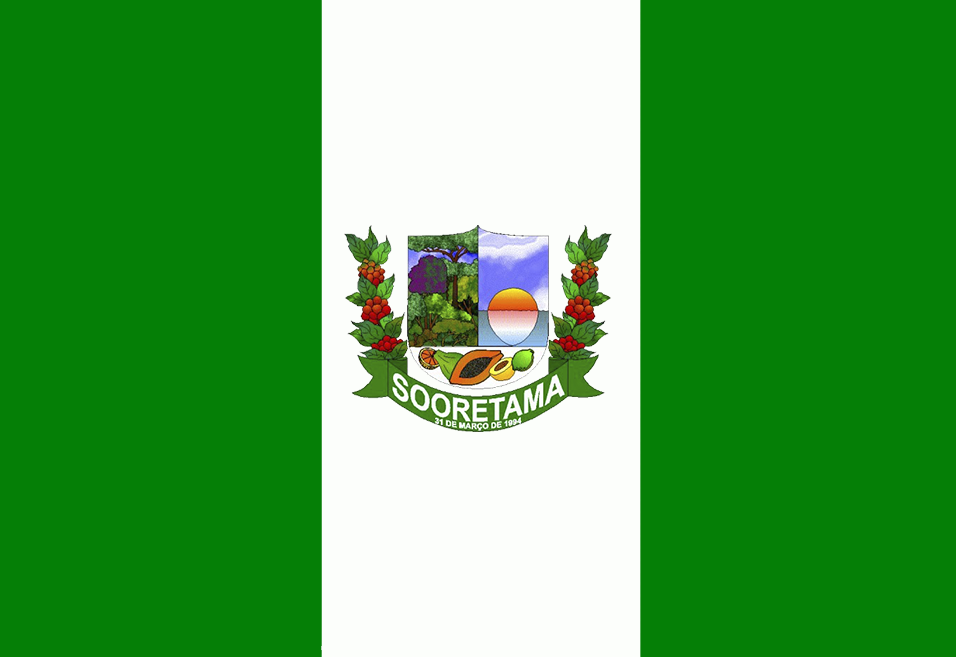
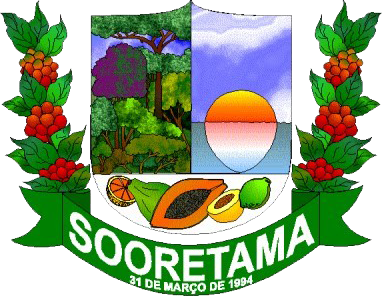
- Flag Coat of arms
- Interactive map of Sooretama
- Coordinates: 19°11′49″S 40°05′52″W
- Country: Brazil
- Region: Southeast
- State: Espírito Santo

Area
  - Total: 587 km^{2} (227 sq mi)

Population (2020)
  - Total: 30,680
  - Density: 52.3/km^{2} (135/sq mi)
- Time zone: UTC−3 (BRT)

Sooretama is a municipality located in the Brazilian state of Espírito Santo. Its population was 30,680 (2020) and its area is 587 km^{2} (227 sq mi).

The municipality contains part of the 27,858-hectare (68,840-acre) Sooretama Biological Reserve, a strictly protected conservation unit created in 1982 when two earlier units were merged.

== See also ==
- List of municipalities in Espírito Santo
