= Astrothelium studerae =

Scientific classification
- Kingdom: Fungi
- Division: Ascomycota
- Class: Dothideomycetes
- Order: Trypetheliales
- Family: Trypetheliaceae
- Genus: Astrothelium
- Species: A. studerae

Binomial name
- Astrothelium studerae Aptroot & M.Cáceres (2019)

Species of lichen

Astrothelium studerae is a species of corticolous (bark-dwelling) lichen in the family Trypetheliaceae. Found in Brazil, it was formally described as a new species in 2019 by lichenologists André Aptroot and Marcela Eugenia da Silva Cáceres. The type specimen was collected by the authors from the Pedra Talhada Biological Reserve (Quebrangulo, Alagoas) at an altitude between 500 and 700 m (1,600 and 2,300 ft). The specific epithet studerae honours Anita Studer, "the protector of the isolated patch of Atlantic rainforest in Alagoas where the new species was collected".

The lichen has an olive-green to yellowish green thallus that is strongly convex and swollen (bullate), and surrounded by a thin (~0.3 mm wide) black prothallus. It has pear-shaped (pyriform) ascomata, measuring 0.7–1.1 mm in diameter, which aggregate in groups of 2 to 5 that share a common ostiole. The ascospores are hyaline, ellipsoid in shape with three transverse septa, and measure 21.5–23.0 by 6.5–7.5 μm. Astrothelium studerae contains lichexanthone, a lichen product that causes the pseudostromata to fluoresce yellow when lit with a long-wavelength UV light.
