= Pernambuco interior forests =

Ecoregion in eastern Brazil

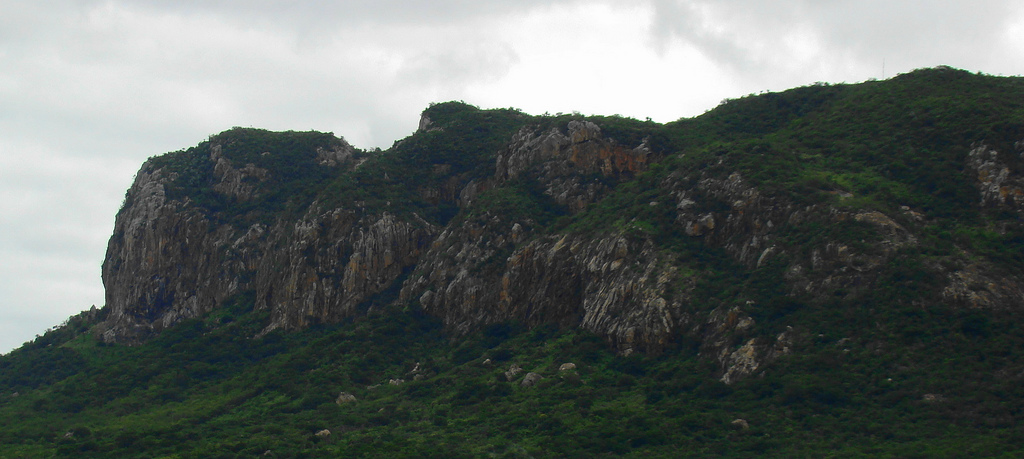
- Pernambuco interior forest in Pedra Talhada Biological Reserve, Brazil.

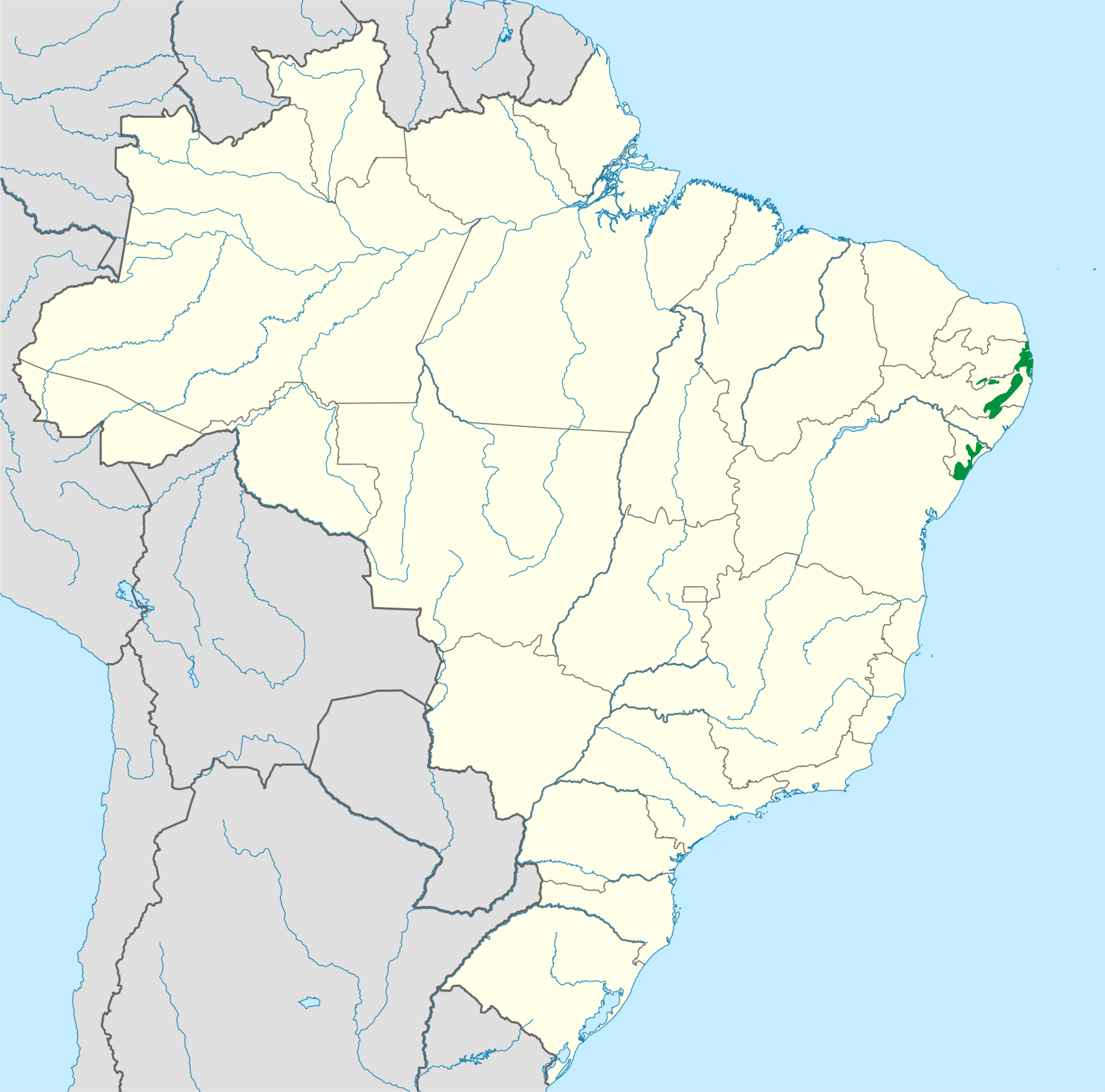
- Pernambuco interior forests ecoregion as defined by WWF.

Ecology
- Biome: Atlantic Forest
- Borders: Caatinga; Pernambuco coastal forests; Southern Atlantic mangroves
- Bird species: 343
- Mammal species: 132

Geography
- Area: 22,792 km^{2} (8,800 sq mi)
- Country: Brazil
- States: Sergipe; Pernambuco; Alagoas; Paraíba; Rio Grande do Norte

Conservation
- Conservation status: Critical/Endangered
- Habitat loss: 95%
- Protected: 0.39%

The "Pernambuco" interior forests (in reality Paraiba and Pernambuco forest/states and not only "Pernambuco") is an ecoregion of the Tropical and subtropical moist broadleaf forests Biome, and the South American Atlantic Forest biome. It lies in eastern Brazil between the coastal Pernambuco coastal forests and the dry Caatinga shrublands of Brazil's interior.

== Setting ==
The Pernambuco interior forests cover an area of 22,700 square kilometers (8,800 sq mi), extending across portions of Paraíba, Pernambuco, and Alagoas states. They extend from the Curimataú River in the north to the São Francisco River in the south.

The Pernambuco interior forests lie inland from the Pernambuco coastal forests, extending from sedimentary plateaus near the coast up the eastern slopes of the Borborema Plateau. In the northern portion of the ecoregion, the interior forests lie close to the coast, just behind the coastal Rio Piranhas mangroves and Atlantic coast restingas.

=== Climate ===
The climate is tropical. Annual rainfall ranges from 1,250 to 1,750 mm, with a dry season from October to March.

== Flora ==
The predominant forest type is the four-tiered (emergent, canopy, understory, and forest floor) Atlantic semi-deciduous forest, with emergent trees reaching up to 35 metres (115 ft). Many trees shed their leaves during the October to March dry season.

Characteristic emergent and canopy trees include Astronium fraxinifolium (family Anacardiaceae), Enterolobium contortisiliquum (Leguminosae), Cordia trichotoma (Boraginaceae), and Tabebuia chrysotricha (Bignoniaceae). The Pernambuco interior forests are home to the largest remaining populations of Brazilwood or Pau-Brasil, (Caesalphinia echinata)

== Fauna ==
Many species are endemic to the Pernambuco interior and coastal forests. Bird species include the buff-breasted tody-tyrant (Hemitriccus mirandae), white-winged cotinga (Xipholena atropurpurea), seven-colored tanager (Tangara fastuosa), and yellow-faced siskin (Carduelis yarrellii).

== Conservation and threats ==
Only 5% of the original forest remains; the rest has been cleared for timber and fuel wood, agriculture, or cattle ranching. Most of the remaining forest remnants are small (1-10 hectares) and species-impoverished.

As of 1997, only three protected areas covered portions of the ecoregion, protecting an area of 90 square kilometers of forest. The Pedra Talhada Biological Reserve, in Quebrangulo, Alagoas, is an important refuge for the endangered and threatened birds of the ecoregion.

== See also ==
- Ecoregions of the Atlantic Forest biome
- Pernambuco coastal forests
- List of plants of Atlantic Forest vegetation of Brazil
- List of ecoregions in Brazil
