= Ponte Nova =

Municipality in central-eastern Minas Gerais state, Brazil

- Municipality
- Municipality of Ponte Nova
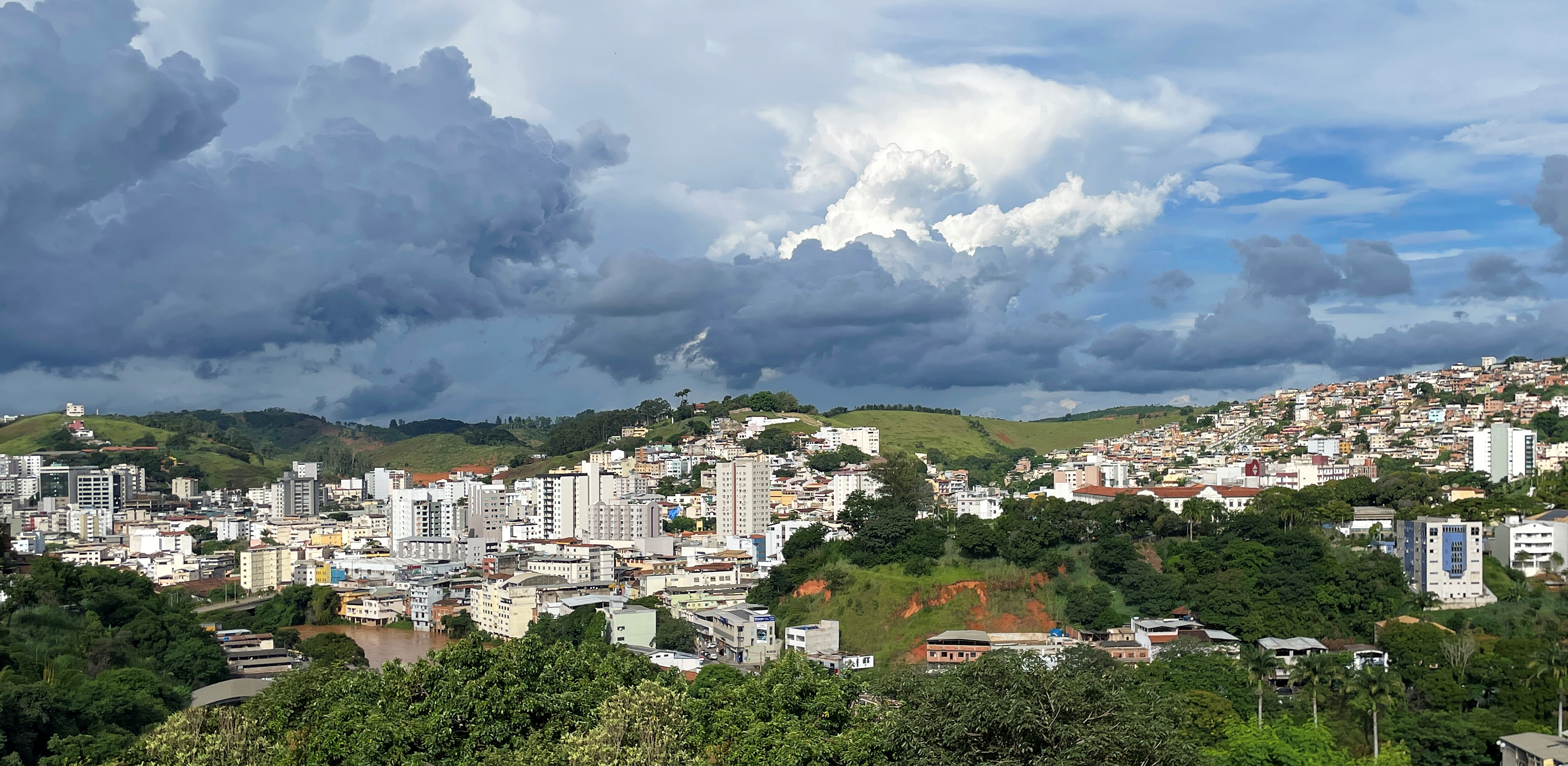
- Partial view of Ponte Nova

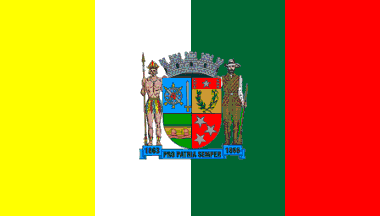
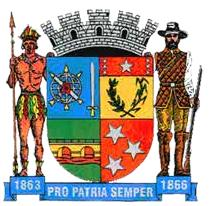
- Flag Coat of arms

- Location in Minas Gerais

- Location in Minas Gerais Location in Brazil
- Coordinates: 20°24′57″S 42°54′32″W
- Country: Brazil
- Region: Southeast
- State: Minas Gerais
- Intermediate region: Juiz de Fora
- Immediate region: Ponte Nova
- Municipality established: July 11, 1857
- City status: October 30, 1866
- Districts: Ponte Nova (seat), Rosário do Pontal, and Vau-Açu

Government
  - Mayor: Milton Teodoro Irias Júnior (Avante)
  - Term ends: 2028

Area
  - Total: 470.643 km^{2} (181.716 sq mi)
- Elevation: 430 m (1,410 ft)

Population (2022 census)
  - Total: 57,776
  - Estimate (2025): 59,638
  - Density: 122.76/km^{2} (317.95/sq mi)
- Demonym: ponte-novense
- Time zone: UTC−3 (BRT)
- HDI (UNDP/2010): 0.717 (high)
- GDP (IBGE/2023): R$2.594 billion
- GDP per capita (IBGE/2023): R$44,898.56
- Website: www.pontenova.mg.gov.br

Ponte Nova is a municipality in central-eastern Minas Gerais state, Brazil.

== Geography ==
Ponte Nova is located a few kilometers south of the Doce River on a tributary called the Piranga. As of 2020, the population is estimated at 59,875 inhabitants and the area of the municipality is 470.6 km. The elevation is 402 meters above sea level. It has railroad connections to Ouro Preto and is linked by state highways to the capital of Belo Horizonte and to Ouro Preto.

The beginnings of the city go back to 1755 when the first farms were established in the region. Agriculture and commerce were the occupations of the first inhabitants. The town saw the cycles of first sugar cane and then coffee. From 1770 to 1832, the town was officially denominated an Arraial and was called Capela Filial do Furquim. In 1862 it was raised to a Vila and Ponte Nova became the seat of a municipality in 1866.

Distances to major cities:

- Belo Horizonte - (MG) 180 km
- São Paulo - (SP) 781 km
- Rio de Janeiro - (RJ) 420 km
- Vitória - (ES) 392 km

== Economy ==
The economy is based on agriculture, limited industry and services. Ponte Nova produces livestock, both dairy and meat, sugarcane, fruits and vegetables, and swine raising, this being quite developed with more than 350 establishments and 30,000 head.

Until recently the city was the center of a prosperous sugar-cane growing area and there were several mills (engenhos in Portuguese). The first sugar cane mill in the state of Minas Gerais was installed in Ponte Nova in 1885. Most of these have now closed.

The municipality included the 377 hectares (930 acres) Fazenda São Mateus Biological Reserve, created in 1974. An audit in 2012 stated that a number of biological reserves created in 1974 on state-owned land were being re-assessed, since they no longer qualified as conservation units. These were Fazenda São Mateus, Carmo da Mata, Colônia 31 de Março and others.

== See also ==
- List of municipalities in Minas Gerais
