= Traçadal Biological Reserve =

Brazilian biological reserve

- Reserva Biológica Traçadal
- IUCN category Ia (strict nature reserve)
- Location within Brazil
- Nearest city: Guajará-Mirim, Rondônia
- Coordinates: 11.411410°S 64.846143°W
- Area: 22,540 hectares (55,700 acres)
- Designation: Biological reserve
- Created: 28 March 1990

The Traçadal Biological Reserve (Portuguese: Reserva Biológica Traçadal) is a biological reserve in the state of Rondônia, Brazil.

== Location ==
The Traçadal Biological Reserve has an area of 22,540 hectares (55,700 acres). It is in the municipality of Guajará-Mirim in the state of Rondônia. In 1999 there were two families with 7 people on the Novo River, the northern boundary of the reserve. It is bounded to the west by the Pacaás-Novas Indigenous Territory, which in turn is bounded to the west by the Mamoré River, the boundary with Bolivia. The Serra da Cutia National Park is about 12 kilometres (7.5 mi) to the south.

The reserve is drained by tributaries of the Pacaás Novos River. It is in the Amazon biome, and is covered entirely in open rainforest. It is in the centre-west Brazilian pediplain, with altitudes around 100 metres (330 ft) above sea level.

== Conservation ==
The Traçadal Biological Reserve was created by decree 4.583 on 28 March 1990. The reserve was created in a special army use area, and is administered by the SEDAM-RO. Since it is so remote, no conservation measures were taken after creation apart from demarcation and the start of the process of land compensation. On 30 June 2004 the state of Rondônia act 94 changed the name to the Traçadal State Biological Reserve, and stated that the reserve must not be an obstacle to construction of the RO-370 highway, considered of vital importance for national defense.

== Sources ==
- REBIO do Traçadal (in Portuguese), ISA: Instituto Socioambiental
- Reserva Biológica Traçadal (in Portuguese), Via Rural, archived from the original on October 20, 2017
