= Dendropsophus studerae =

Conservation status
- Data Deficient (IUCN 3.1)

Scientific classification
- Kingdom: Animalia
- Phylum: Chordata
- Class: Amphibia
- Order: Anura
- Family: Hylidae
- Genus: Dendropsophus
- Species: D. studerae

Binomial name
- Dendropsophus studerae (Carvalho-e-Silva, Carvalho-e-Silva & Izecksohn, 2003)

Species of amphibian

Dendropsophus studerae is a species of frogs in the family Hylidae.

It is endemic to Quebrangulo, in the State of Alagoas, Brazil. Its specific name honours Anita Studer, a Swiss ornithologist who has been active in trying to save the rainforest.

Its natural habitats are subtropical or tropical seasonally wet or flooded lowland grassland, swamps, intermittent freshwater lakes, and intermittent freshwater marshes. Dendropsophus studerae have not been observed below 600m above sea level.
