= Anita Studer =

Swiss accountant (1944–2025)

Anita Studer (February 26, 1944 — September 15, 2025) was a Swiss-born accountant, ornithologist, conservationist and ecologist.

From 1980 onwards, Studer was actively engaged in saving a forest in northeastern Brazil. She was born in Brienz; at the age of 12, she moved with her family to Geneva. She first visited Brazil in 1976 to observe its rich variety of birds. On her return, she pursued a master's degree in ornithology at Nancy-Université. Five years later, in Brazil, she first saw a rare blackbird Forbes's blackbird (Curaeus forbesi), known locally as "anumará", in the Pedra Talhada forest in the state of Alagoas. Her academic supervisor told her that the bird was a good subject for study but that the forest, the bird's habitat, would be gone in nine to ten years. The forest was being cleared to allow the raising of cattle and planting of sugar cane. Instead of studying the bird, Studer decided to save the forest.

== Life ==
Her lobbying efforts resulted in 4,500 hectares of the Pedra Talhada forest being declared a federal reserve. Studer initiated the planting of new trees - over 800 hectares; to ensure biodiversity, the trees planted include a number of indigenous species. She also involved local children in these projects. For raising funds, Studer established the Nordesta Association in Switzerland which also has provided funding for new schools in the local villages. She also helped develop businesses to improve the local economy. Studer herself makes a living by working as an accountant in Geneva.

Her initiatives in Brazil were the subject of a 1996 documentary "Mother Forest and the Street Children", written and produced by David Martinez of Dreamtime Productions and seen on the Discovery Channel.

Studer received a Rolex Award for Enterprise in 1990 for her environmental work.

A species of frog, Dendropsophus studerae, was named in her honour, as well as the lichen species Astrothelium studerae. In 2026, the new ant thrush Chamaeza studerae from Alagoas was named after her.

She died on 15 September 2025 in Geneva.

== Scientific and environmental activities ==
Retrieved from the archives
Year(s)	Activity/Achievement
2019	Preparation for planting the 6'500'000th tree in Brazil.
1989/19	Technical coordination of 15 tropical university researches in the fields of: Podology, Hydrology, Botany, Mammals, Amphibians, Fishes, Reptiles, Gastropods, Insects, Birds.
1980/19	Eco-ethological studies of Brazilian Birds: Field observation and behavioral analyzes for the establishment of conservation strategies.
2013	Honorary Professor of the University Foundation of Iguatama, FEVASF, MG Brazil
2006/14	Protection campaign for raptors and parrots in the Amazon.
2004	Inauguration of the “Solar lighting for 50 schools” project, State of Maranhâo in Brazil.
1994	Associate researcher of the Museu Nacional, Rio de Janeiro, Brazil
