= Alborghetti =

Alborghetti is an Italian surname. Notable people with the surname include:

- Lisa Alborghetti (born 1993), Italian women's footballer
- Luiz Carlos Alborghetti (1945–2009), Brazilian radio personality and conservative commentator
- Mario Alborghetti (1928–1955), Italian racing driver
