= Luiz Fernando (footballer, born July 1988) =

Brazilian footballer

Personal information
- Full name: Luiz Fernando Corrêa Sales
- Date of birth: July 17, 1988 (age 38)
- Place of birth: Carmo da Mata-MG, Brazil
- Height: 1.70 m (5 ft 7 in)
- Position: Attacking midfielder

Team information
- Current team: East Riffa
- Number: 17

Youth career
- 2006–2007: Cruzeiro

Senior career*
Years	Team	Apps	(Gls)
2008–2010	Cruzeiro	2	(0)
2009–2010	→ Ipatinga (loan)	19	(1)
2010	Rio Claro		
2010	São Caetano	1	(0)
2011	Guarani-MG		
2011	Vila Nova	24	(2)
2012	Figueirense	7	(0)
2012–2013	Dibba Al-Fujairah	22	(6)
2013	Al-Arabi		
2014	Icasa	9	(0)
2015–2018	Tombense	9	(0)
2015	→ Mogi Mirim (loan)	9	(1)
2016	→ CRB (loan)	0	(0)
2017	→ Rio Preto (loan)	0	(0)
2018–2019	América RN	8	(1)
2019	Villa Nova	0	(0)
2019	Patrocinense	8	(4)
2019–	East Riffa	13	(5)
- * Club domestic league appearances and goals

Luiz Fernando Corrêa Sales or simply Luiz Fernando (born July 17, 1988 in Carmo da Mata), is a Brazilian attacking midfielder. He currently plays for Bahraini Premier League side East Riffa Club.

== Contract ==
- Cruzeiro: 1 February 2008 to 30 January 2010
- Vila Nova: 13 May 2011 to 30 November 2011
