= Araucárias Biological Reserve =

Biological reserve in Paraná, Brazil

- Reserva Biológica das Araucárias
- IUCN category Ia (strict nature reserve)
- Location within Brazil
- Nearest city: Ponta Grossa, Paraná
- Coordinates: 25.250°S 50.499°W
- Area: 149.3 square kilometres (57.6 sq mi)
- Designation: Biological reserve
- Created: 23 March 2006

The Araucárias Biological Reserve (Portuguese: Reserva Biológica das Araucárias) is a biological reserve in the state of Paraná, Brazil. It contains a sample of the Atlantic Forest biome, a remnant of the Araucária forest.

== Formation ==
The Araucárias Biological Reserve, with an area of 149.3 square kilometres (57.6 sq mi) was created on 23 March 2006. It is administered by the Chico Mendes Institute for Biodiversity Conservation. It contains a sample of the Atlantic Forest biome. It covers parts of the Fernandes Pinheiro, Imbituva, Ipiranga and Teixeira Soares municipalities in the state of Paraná. The purpose is to fully preserve the biota without direct human interference.

== Status ==
The Araucárias Biological Reserve is one of the last remaining areas in the Araucária forest with conservation potential. It is home to endangered species and archaeological sites. The area holds significant areas of floodplains, swamps and gallery forest. The reserve is a "strict nature reserve" under IUCN protected area category Ia.

== Sources ==
- Reserva Biológica das Araucárias (in Portuguese), Chico Mendes Institute for Biodiversity Conservation.
- Reserva Biológica das Araucárias (PDF) (in Portuguese), MMA: Ministry of the Environment
- Triana, Elisa (29 May 2009), "Strict Nature Reserves in Brazil", The Encyclopedia of Earth
