= Andradina =

Municipality in the state of São Paulo in Brazil

- Municipality
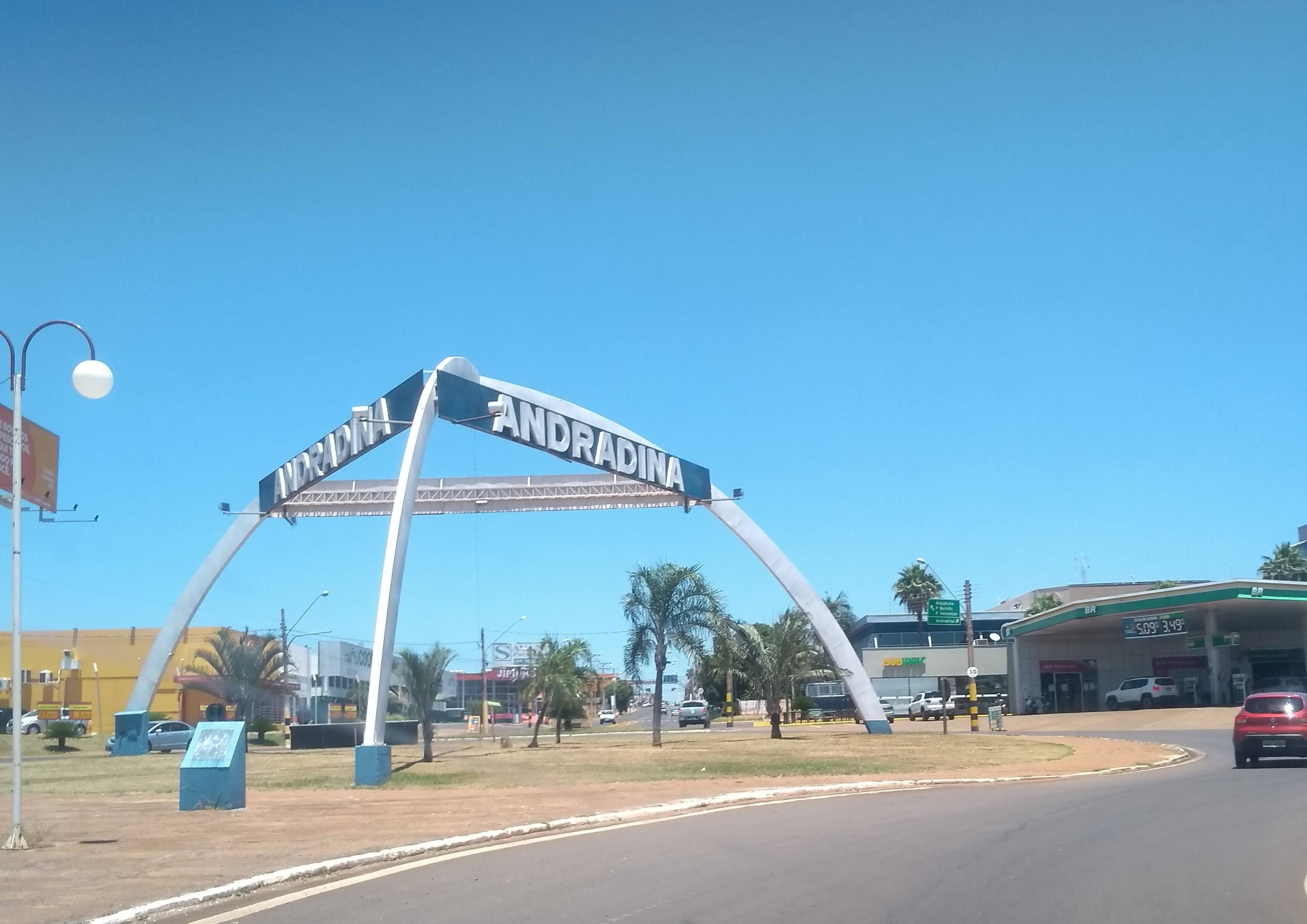

- Flag Coat of arms
- Nickname: Terra do Rei do Gado (Land of the King of Cattle)
- Anthem: Hino do município de Andradina
- Interactive map of Andradina
- Location within the State of São Paulo Location within Brazil Location within South America
- Coordinates: 20°53′45″S 51°22′44″W
- Country: Brazil
- Region: Southeast
- State: São Paulo
- Mesoregion: Araçatuba
- Microregion: Andradina
- Founded: 11 July 1937
- Incorporated: 30 November 1938
- Founder: Antônio Joaquim de Moura Andrade
- Named for: Antônio Joaquim de Moura Andrade

Government
  - Type: Mayor–council
  - Mayor: Mário Celso Lopes (PSDB)
  - Municipal Chamber: Councilors: Carlos Alexandre Soares (MDB); Claudia Ribeiro (DEM); Edgar Dourado de Matos (PV); Geraldo Shiomi Junior (PTB); Luis Gustavo Marão Calestini (MDB); Hernani Martins da Silva (PODE); Joaquim Justino da Silva (PSDB); José Augusto Rosa (MDB); Marcio Makoto Izumi (PT); Raimundo Justino de Souza (PATRI); Roberto Carlos Rodrigues Nunes (PDT); Rodarte Silva dos Anjos (PATRI); Sérgio dos Santos Santaela (DEM); Silas Carlos de Oliveira (PDT); Wilson Aparecido Bossolan (PPS)

Area
  - Municipality: 964.226 km^{2} (372.290 sq mi)
  - Rank: 1,466th, Brazil
- Highest elevation (Paranápolis): 403.31 m (1,323.2 ft)
- Lowest elevation (Urban area): 392.02 m (1,286.2 ft)

Population (2010)
  - Municipality: 55,334
  - Estimate (2020): 57,202
  - Rank: 538th, Brazil
  - Density: 57.39/km^{2} (148.6/sq mi)
  - Urban: 51,649
  - Rural: 3,685
- Demonym: andradinense

Ethnicity
  - White: 58.27% (32,243 inhabitants)
  - Pardo: 35.13% (19,438 inhabitants)
  - Black: 4.24% (2,347 inhabitants)
  - Yellow: 2.34% (1,296 inhabitants)
  - Indian: 0.02% (10 inhabitants)
- Time zone: UTC−3 (BRT)
- Postal codes: 16900-000–16919-999
- Area code: 18
- HDI (2010): 0.779 – high
- Website: Official website

Andradina is a municipality of the state of São Paulo, Brazil.

It has an estimated population of 57,202 (as of 2020) in an area of 964.226 km^{2} (372 sq mi). The municipality contains the 168-hectare (420-acre) of Andradina Biological Reserve, a strictly protected area. The municipality can be accessed mainly by Rodovia Marechal Cândido Rondon/BR-300 (Marechal Rondon highway).

== History ==
The municipality was created by state law in 1938.

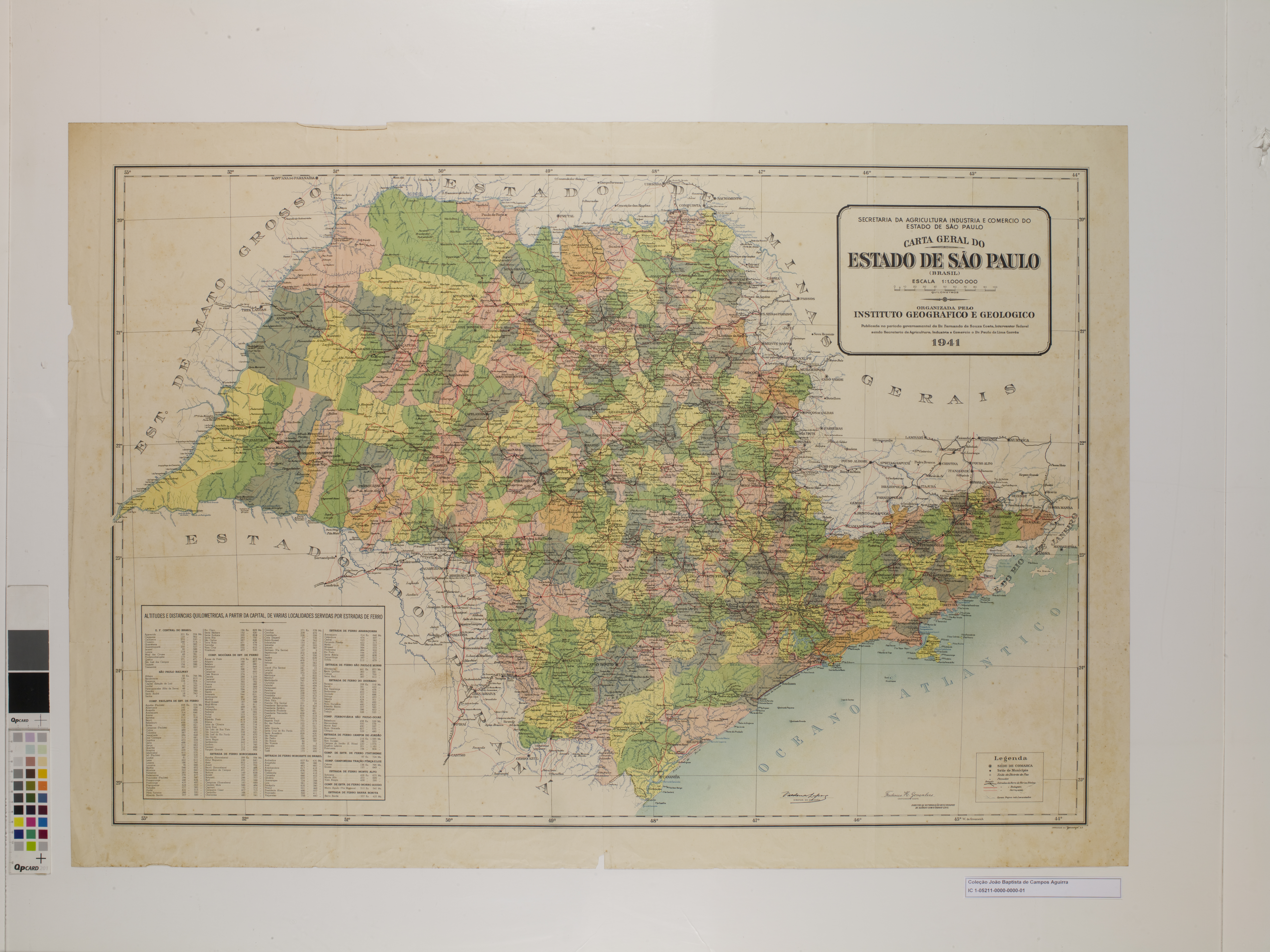
Map of the state of São Paulo (1938).

== Demographics ==
Historical population (municipality)
| Year | Population | %± |
|---|---|---|
| 1940 | 14,424 | — |
| 1950 | 48,783 | 238.2% |
| 1960 | 38,430 | −21.2% |
| 1970 | 51,688 | 34.5% |
| 1980 | 47,664 | −7.8% |
| 1991 | 52,409 | 10.0% |
| 2000 | 55,161 | 5.3% |
| 2010 | 55,334 | 0.3% |
| 2022 | 59,783 | 8.0% |

== Transportation ==
The city is served by Paulino Ribeiro de Andrade State Airport.

== Media ==
In telecommunications, the city was served by Companhia de Telecomunicações do Estado de São Paulo until 1975, when it began to be served by Telecomunicações de São Paulo. In July 1998, this company was acquired by Telefónica, which adopted the Vivo brand in 2012.

The company is currently an operator of cell phones, fixed lines, internet (fiber optics/4G) and television (satellite and cable).

== Notable people ==
- Edi Carlo Dias Marçal Andradina, football player and manager.
- Luiz Carlos Alborghetti, broadcaster, television presenter and politician.
- Ricardo Prado, swimmer, Olympic runner-up, World Champion.

== Climate ==
Climate data for Andradina, elevation 379 m (1,243 ft), (1981–2010 normals, extremes 1981–1997)
| Month | Jan | Feb | Mar | Apr | May | Jun | Jul | Aug | Sep | Oct | Nov | Dec | Year |
|---|---|---|---|---|---|---|---|---|---|---|---|---|---|
| Record high °C (°F) | 38.2 (100.8) | 36.8 (98.2) | 36.3 (97.3) | 35.1 (95.2) | 33.7 (92.7) | 33.0 (91.4) | 33.8 (92.8) | 37.6 (99.7) | 38.9 (102.0) | 39.4 (102.9) | 38.8 (101.8) | 39.6 (103.3) | 39.6 (103.3) |
| Mean daily maximum °C (°F) | 31.2 (88.2) | 31.4 (88.5) | 31.1 (88.0) | 30.2 (86.4) | 28.0 (82.4) | 27.2 (81.0) | 27.6 (81.7) | 29.6 (85.3) | 29.9 (85.8) | 31.8 (89.2) | 32.0 (89.6) | 31.7 (89.1) | 30.1 (86.2) |
| Daily mean °C (°F) | 25.1 (77.2) | 25.2 (77.4) | 24.7 (76.5) | 23.7 (74.7) | 21.3 (70.3) | 19.6 (67.3) | 19.6 (67.3) | 21.4 (70.5) | 22.4 (72.3) | 24.6 (76.3) | 25.3 (77.5) | 25.4 (77.7) | 23.2 (73.8) |
| Mean daily minimum °C (°F) | 20.9 (69.6) | 21.2 (70.2) | 20.6 (69.1) | 19.2 (66.6) | 16.9 (62.4) | 14.7 (58.5) | 13.8 (56.8) | 15.2 (59.4) | 16.9 (62.4) | 19.3 (66.7) | 20.4 (68.7) | 21.1 (70.0) | 18.4 (65.1) |
| Record low °C (°F) | 16.6 (61.9) | 10.9 (51.6) | 9.8 (49.6) | 11.2 (52.2) | 4.2 (39.6) | 0.9 (33.6) | 1.0 (33.8) | 2.8 (37.0) | 6.6 (43.9) | 11.7 (53.1) | 12.4 (54.3) | 15.8 (60.4) | 0.9 (33.6) |
| Average precipitation mm (inches) | 233.6 (9.20) | 183.9 (7.24) | 147.7 (5.81) | 93.9 (3.70) | 69.6 (2.74) | 27.5 (1.08) | 18.0 (0.71) | 42.2 (1.66) | 72.1 (2.84) | 116.6 (4.59) | 125.2 (4.93) | 197.1 (7.76) | 1,327.4 (52.26) |
| Average precipitation days (≥ 1.0 mm) | 14 | 11 | 9 | 6 | 5 | 3 | 2 | 3 | 7 | 7 | 8 | 13 | 88 |
| Average relative humidity (%) | 81.7 | 82.1 | 81.4 | 79.1 | 77.1 | 73.0 | 65.6 | 60.4 | 67.2 | 67.6 | 69.8 | 77.5 | 73.5 |
| Mean monthly sunshine hours | 201.4 | 189.9 | 213.4 | 235.9 | 234.9 | 216.9 | 246.5 | 232.0 | 184.0 | 231.4 | 241.1 | 220.4 | 2,647.8 |
Source: Instituto Nacional de Meteorologia

== See also ==
- List of municipalities in São Paulo
- Interior of São Paulo
