= Andradina Biological Reserve =

Protected area in Brazil

- Reserva Biológica de Andradina
- IUCN category Ia (strict nature reserve)
- Location within Brazil
- Coordinates: 20.8807°S 51.3353°W
- Area: 168 hectares (420 acres)
- Designation: Biological reserve
- Created: 17 December 1985
- Administrator: Agencia Paulista de Tecnologia das Agronegócios

Andradina Biological Reserve (Portuguese: Reserva Biológica de Andradina) is a biological reserve administered by São Paulo state, Brazil.

== Location ==
The reserve was created by São Paulo state on 17 December 1985 as a biological reserve under the terms of the Federal Law 4.771 of 15 September 1965. It had formerly been the Estação Experimental de Zootecnia de Andradina. It is located in the municipality of Andradina. It covers an area of 168 hectares (420 acres)

== Conservation ==
The reserve is home to endangered titi monkeys. Threats include encroachment of people, cattle and horses, accidental fires, poaching and siltation and pollution of the water courses.

== Sources ==
- Contrato 093/10 (PDF) (in Portuguese), VALEC
- Gazeta da Região Sidy Silva (21 July 2014), Andradina 77 anos Especial Terra do Rei do Gado o grande desenvolvimento urbano
- Montoro, Franco (17 December 1985), LEI N. 4.920, DE 17 DE DEZEMBRO DE 1985 (in Portuguese), Legislature of Sao Paulo
- Reserva Biológica de Andradina (in Portuguese), MERCOSUR, archived from the original on 2016-05-12
