= Biological reserve (Brazil) =

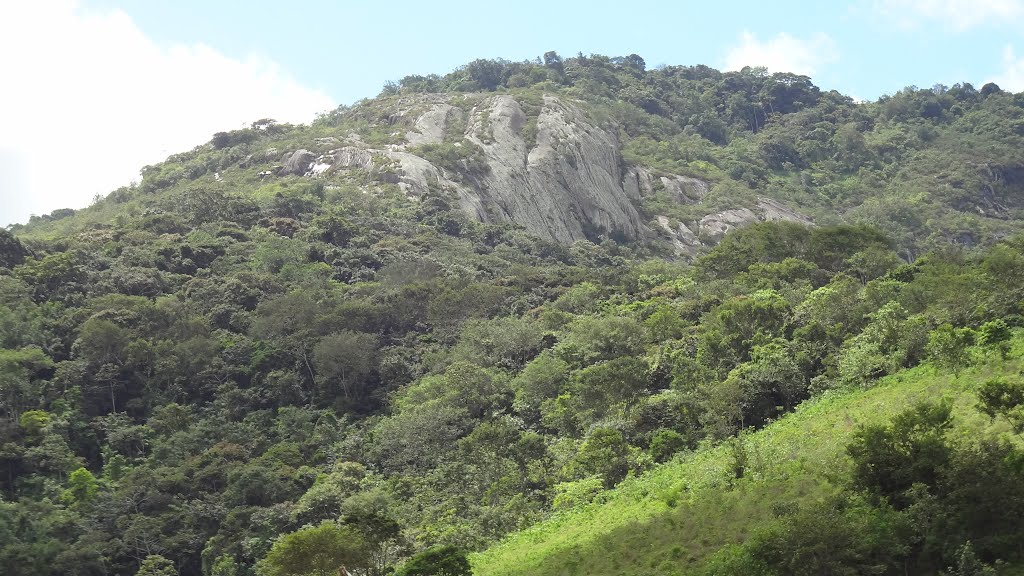
Pedra Talhada Biological Reserve, Alagoas, June 2012

A biological reserve (Portuguese: Reserva biológica, Rebio) in Brazil is a legally defined type of protected area of Brazil, a conservation unit that aims for full preservation of biota and other natural attributes without human interference. It may be visited only with prior approval of the responsible agency, and only for research or educational purposes.

== Definition ==
A "Biological reserve" in Brazil is one of the Integral Protection Units defined by Article 13 of Law No. 9,985 of 18 July 2000, National System of Nature Conservation Units (SNUC). The biological reserve is public property. When it is established any private lands within its limits are expropriated. The manager of the biological reserve must prepare a management plan for approval by the responsible agency. The approved management plan is accessible by the public.

This category of conservation unit aims at full preservation of biota and other natural attributes without direct human interference or environmental changes. The exception is for measures to recover altered ecosystems and management actions required to restore and preserve natural balance, biological diversity and natural ecological processes. Public access is prohibited with the exception of visits for educational purposes as defined in management plan. Research may be conducted after prior approval of the responsible agency and is also subject to the agency's conditions and restrictions.

== Selected list ==
Name	Level	State	Area (ha)	Created	Biome
Abufari	Federal	Amazonas	288,000	1982	Amazon
Andradina	State	São Paulo	168	1985	Atlantic Forest
Araras	State	Rio de Janeiro	3,862	1977	Atlantic Forest
Araucárias	Federal	Paraná	14,919	2006	Atlantic Forest
Atol das Rocas	Federal	Rio Grande do Norte	36,249	1979	Coastal Marine
Augusto Ruschi	Federal	Espírito Santo	4,000	1982	Atlantic Forest
Banhados do Delta	State	Rio Grande do Sul	17,245	1976	Coastal Marine
Bom Jesus	Federal	Paraná	34,179	2012	Atlantic Forest
Canela Preta	State	Santa Catarina	1,899	1980	Atlantic Forest
Carmo da Mata	State	Minas Gerais	86	1974	(closed)
Colônia 31 de Março	State	Minas Gerais	5,030	1974	(closed)
Comboios	Federal	Espírito Santo	833	1984	Coastal Marine
Contagem	Federal	Federal District	3,460	2002	Cerrado
Córrego do Veado	Federal	Espírito Santo	2,392	1982	Atlantic Forest
Córrego Grande	Federal	Bahia, Espírito Santo	1,504	1989	Atlantic Forest
Culuene	State	Mato Grosso	3,900	1989	Amazon
Duas Bocas	State	Espírito Santo	2,910	1991	Atlantic Forest
Fazenda São Mateus	State	Minas Gerais	377	1974	(closed)
Fontes do Ipiranga	State	São Paulo	357	1969	Atlantic Forest
Guaporé	Federal	Rondônia	600,000	1982	Amazon
Guaratiba	State	Rio de Janeiro	3,360	1974	Coastal Marine
Guaribas	Federal	Paraíba	4,321	1990	Atlantic Forest
Gurupi	Federal	Maranhão	341,650	1988	Amazon
Ibirapuitã	State	Rio Grande do Sul	351	1982	Pampas
Ilha do Cabo Frio	Municipal	Rio de Janeiro	700	1990	Coastal Marine
Jaíba	State	Minas Gerais	6,358	1973	Caatinga
Jaru	Federal	Rondônia	353,335	1961	Amazon
Lago Piratuba	Federal	Amapá	357,000	1980	Amazon
Lami José Lutzenberger	Municipal	Rio Grande do Sul	179	1975	Coastal Marine
Lapinha	State	Minas Gerais	369	1974	Atlantic Forest
Maicuru	State	Pará	1,151,761	2006	Amazon
Manicoré	Federal	Amazonas	359,063	2016	Amazon
Marinha do Arvoredo	Federal	Santa Catarina	17,600	1990	Coastal Marine
Mata Escura	Federal	Minas Gerais	50,890	2003	Atlantic Forest
Mata Paludosa	State	Rio Grande do Sul	272	1998	Atlantic Forest
Mogi-Guaçu	State	São Paulo	469	1942	Cerrado
Morro dos Seis Lagos	State	Amazonas	36,900	1990	Amazon
Nascentes da Serra do Cachimbo	Federal	Pará	342,478	2005	Amazon
Parazinho	State	Amapá	111	1985	Amazon
Pedra Talhada	Federal	Alagoas, Pernambuco	4,469	1989	Atlantic Forest
Perobas	Federal	Paraná	8,716	2006	Atlantic Forest
Pindorama	State	São Paulo	533	1986	Atlantic Forest
Poço das Antas	Federal	Rio de Janeiro	5,000	1974	Atlantic Forest
Praia do Sul	State	Rio de Janeiro	3,502	1981	Coastal Marine
Professor José Ângelo Rizzo	University	Goiás	144	1969	Cerrado
Rio Ouro Preto	State	Rondônia	46,438	1990	Amazon
Rio Trombetas	Federal	Pará	385,000	1979	Amazon
Saltinho	Federal	Pernambuco	548	1983	Atlantic Forest
Santa Isabel	Federal	Sergipe	2,766	1988	Coastal Marine
Santa Rita	Municipal	Minas Gerais	305	1980	Atlantic Forest
São Donato	State	Rio Grande do Sul	4,392	1975	Pampas
São Sebastião do Paraíso	State	Minas Gerais	248	1974	Atlantic Forest
Serra Negra	Federal	Pernambuco	1,100	1982	Atlantic Forest
Sooretama	Federal	Espírito Santo	24,000	1982	Atlantic Forest
Tamboré	Municipal	São Paulo	367		Atlantic Forest
Tapirapé	Federal	Pará	103,000	1989	Amazon
Tinguá	Federal	Rio de Janeiro	26,000	1989	Atlantic Forest
Traçadal	State	Rondônia	22,540	1990	Amazon
Uatumã	Federal	Amazonas	940,358	1990	Amazon
Una	Federal	Bahia	18,500	1980	Atlantic Forest
União	Federal	Rio de Janeiro	3,126	1998	Atlantic Forest
Vila Facchini	State	São Paulo	70	1965	Atlantic Forest

== Sources ==
- Categorias de unidades de conservação (in Portuguese), Chico Mendes Institute for Biodiversity Conservation, archived from the original on 2016-05-23
- Decreto Nº 4.340, de 22 de Agosto de 2002, Presidência da República - Casa Civil - Subchefia para Assuntos Jurídicos, August 22, 2002
- LEI No 9.985, DE 18 DE JULHO DE 2000, Presidência da República - Casa Civil- Subchefia para Assuntos Jurídicos, 18 July 2000
