= Contagem Biological Reserve =

Biological reserve in Brazil

- Reserva Biológica da Contagem
- IUCN category Ia (strict nature reserve)
- Location within Brazil
- Coordinates: 15°38′24″S 47°52′19″W
- Area: 3,426.15 hectares (8,466.2 acres)
- Designation: Biological reserve
- Created: 13 December 2002
- Administrator: Chico Mendes Institute for Biodiversity Conservation

The Contagem Biological Reserve (Portuguese: Reserva Biológica da Contagem) is a biological reserve in the Federal District, Brazil. It protects an area of the Cerrado biome, and provides an ecological corridor linking the Brasília National Park and the Maranhão River basin. The reserve is threatened by human intrusions from the built-up areas within it and surrounding it.

== Location ==
The Contagem Biological Reserve covers 3,426.15 hectares (8,466.2 acres) in the cerrado biome. It is in the administrative region of Sobradinho in the north of the Federal District, bounded to the south by the DF-001 highway and the Brasília National Park. The reserve contains the escarpment and top of the Chapada da Contagem, with altitudes from 1,000 to 1,200 metres (3,300 to 3,900 ft). The escarpment is steep while the top is relatively flat. It is between the basin of the Maranhão River in the Tocantins River basin, and that of the São Bartolomeu River in the Paraná River basin. The reserve includes two water intakes in the Contagem River and Paranoazinho stream that supply the city of Sobradinho.

== History ==
In three places artifacts have been found that are 8,000 years old. The Royal Road of Bahia crossed the reserve in the 18th and 19th centuries. The first report of transit through the region is of a drover in 1734. The Contagem de São João das Três Barras was established by the Portuguese crown in the site in 1736. The exact location has been forgotten but the name contegem ("count" or "score") remains. The old tax office "counted" slaves and goods. It taxed the flow of mining products from Tocantins and Goiás en route to Minas Gerais.

The reserve is penetrated by human settlements that were established without official planning before the importance of the area was recognized. The Basevi village in the centre of the reserve grew up around an old gravel quarry used for the construction of Brasília. Today it has more than 4,000 people with a high birth rate, two asphalt plants, schools, but no sewage. The prosperous Grande Colorado walled community stretches into the reserve from the east. There are other communities around the reserve and four irregular farms.

== Environment ==
Average annual rainfall is 1,454 metres (4,770 ft). Temperatures range from 12 to 28 °C (54 to 82 °F) and average 20 °C (68 °F). Vegetation includes cerrado strict sense, dense cerrado and campo sujo. The reserve includes areas of great scenic beauty, such as the Sobradinho waterfall and the Chapada da Contagem. The reserve provides an ecological corridor between the Brasília National Park and the Maranhão basin. Various animals use the reserve as a corridor for dispersion from the Brasília National Park, such as the yellow-faced parrot (Alipiopsitta xanthops). The reserve is known for the presence of Vanderhaege's toad-headed turtle (Mesoclemmys vanderhaegei) and the frog Bokermannohyla pseudopseudis. Protected species include giant anteater (Myrmecophaga tridactyla) and giant armadillo (Priodontes maximus).

== Conservation ==
The Contagem Biological Reserve was created on 13 December 2002. It is classed as IUCN protected area category Ia (strict nature reserve), which has the purpose of fully preserving biota and other natural attributes without direct human interference. Specifically it was created to preserve the cerrado fragments and water resources in the unit. The reserve is administered by the Chico Mendes Institute for Biodiversity Conservation. As of 2009 there were only three staff assigned to the reserve, based in the national park, with no headquarters or monitoring stations. 54% of the lands is clearly public property, but the remaining land is private or under litigation and has not been regularized.

Illegal trails run into the reserve from several neighbourhoods, mainly from Sobradinho and Basevi village. Part of the attraction of the reserve is that it provides green space that was not included in the built up areas around it. People enter the reserve for fishing, barbecues and leisure, race motor bikes on dirt trails, kill animals and discard oil and shampoo. Transients live and make fires in the reserve. Sewage and garbage is illegally dumped in the reserve, and livestock sometimes intrudes.

== Sources ==
- Aldem Bourscheit (17 September 2009), Cercada pelo crescimento urbano (in Portuguese)
- RB da Contagem (in Portuguese), WWF Brasil, archived from the original on 2016-06-25
- Reserva Biológica da Chapada da Contagem (in Portuguese), Via Rural, archived from the original on 2016-06-05
- Reserva Biológica da Contagem (in Portuguese), Chico Mendes Institute for Biodiversity Conservation
- Unidade de Conservação: Reserva Biológica da Contagem (in Portuguese), MMA: Ministério do Meio Ambiente
