= Perobas Biological Reserve =

Biological reserve in Brazil

- Reserva Biológica das Perobas
- IUCN category Ia (strict nature reserve)
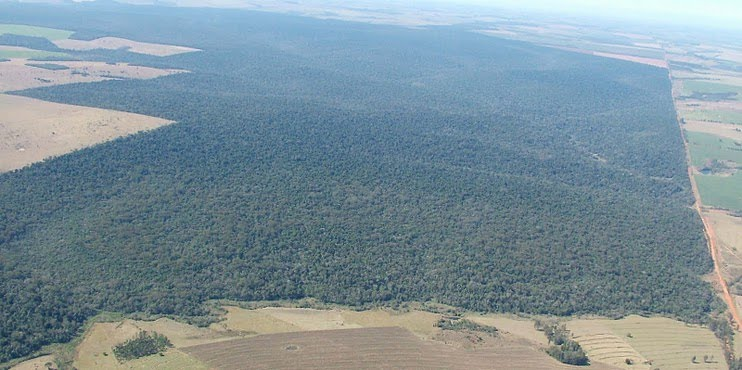
- 2010 Aerial view of Perobas Biological Reserve

- Location within Brazil
- Nearest city: Campo Mourão, Paraná
- Coordinates: 23°51′14″S 52°45′00″W
- Area: 8,716 hectares (21,540 acres)
- Designation: Biological reserve
- Created: 20 March 2006

Perobas Biological Reserve (Portuguese: Reserva Biológica das Perobas) is a biological reserve in the state of Paraná, Brazil.

== History ==
The reserve, which has an area of 8,716 hectares (21,540 acres), was created on 20 March 2006. It is located in the municipalities of Tuneiras do Oeste and Cianorte of Paraná. It is managed by the Chico Mendes Institute for Biodiversity Conservation.

== Status ==
As of 2009 the Biological Reserve was a "strict nature reserve" under IUCN protected area category Ia. Ecologically it is a contact area between semi-deciduous forest and mixed rain forest, with many peroba trees, an endangered species. An isolated fragment of forest, it is the only wildlife refuge in the region with great diversity of species. It is located in the basin of the Ivaí River, which is extremely degraded, with fragile and vulnerable soil.

== Sources ==
- Rebio das Perobas (in Portuguese), Chico Mendes Institute for Biodiversity Conservation
- Reserva Biológica das Perobas (PDF) (in Portuguese), MMA
- Triana, Elisa (29 May 2009), "Strict Nature Reserves in Brazil", The Encyclopedia of Earth
