= Terra de Areia =

Municipality of Rio Grande do Sul, Brazil

- Municipality
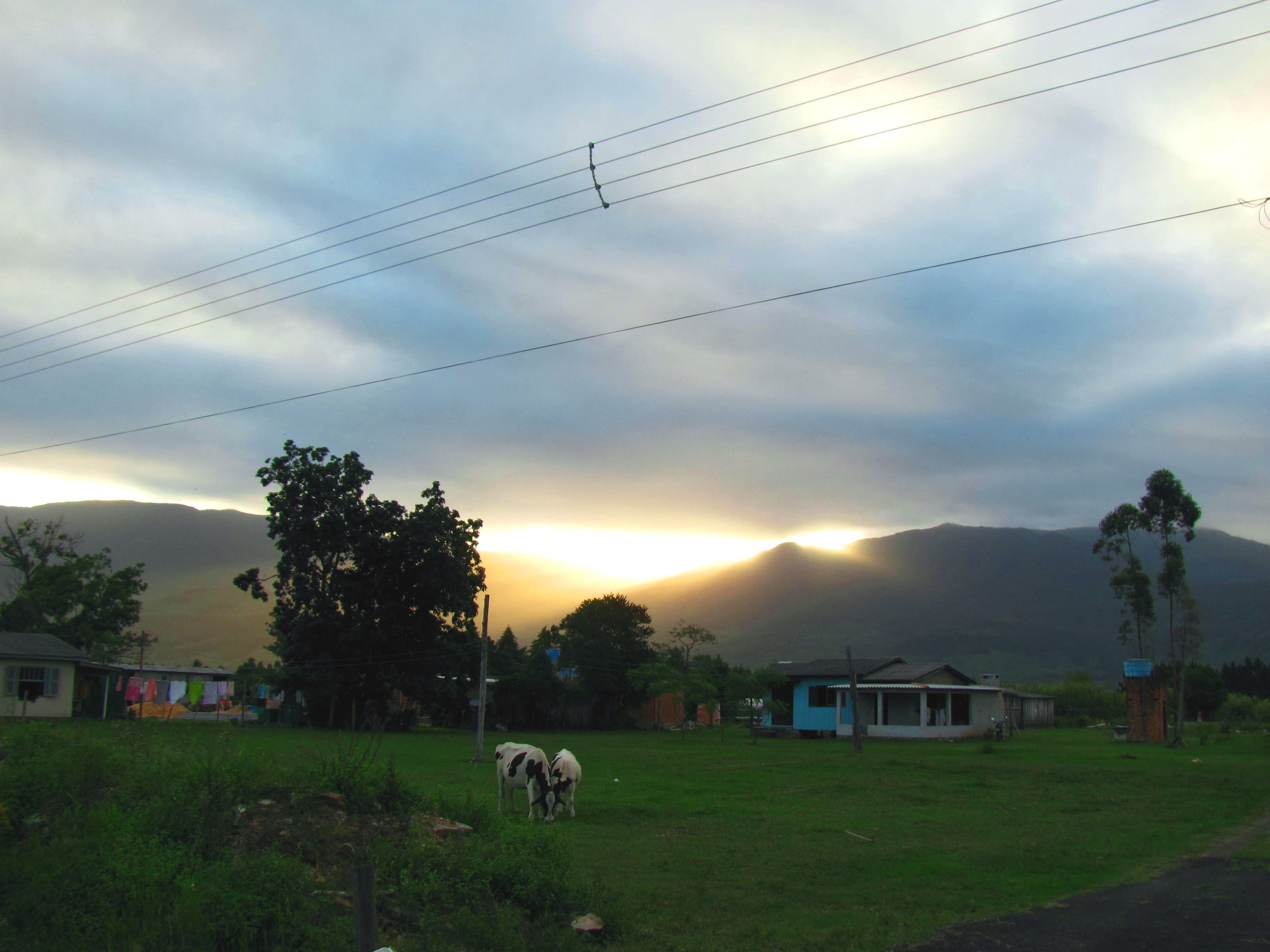
- Terra de Areia in 2013

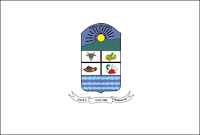
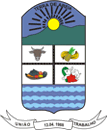
- Flag Coat of arms

- Location within Rio Grande do Sul

- Location in Brazil
- Coordinates: 29°35′S 50°04′W
- Country: Brazil
- State: Rio Grande do Sul

Population (2020)
  - Total: 11,315
- Time zone: UTC−3 (BRT)

Terra de Areia is a municipality in the state of Rio Grande do Sul, Brazil.

The municipality contains the 113 hectares (280 acres) Mata Paludosa Biological Reserve, created in 1998, a fully protected conservation unit.

== See also ==
- List of municipalities in Rio Grande do Sul
