= Araras State Biological Reserve =

- Reserva Biológica de Araras
- Location within Brazil
- Nearest city: Petrópolis
- Coordinates: 22.45°S 43.26°W
- Area: 3,862 hectares (9,540 acres)
- Designation: Biological reserve
- Created: 7 July 1977

Araras State Biological Reserve (Portuguese: Reserva Biológica de Araras) is a biological reserve in Rio de Janeiro, Brazil.

== Location ==
The reserve is located in the mountainous Serra do Mar region in the Atlantic Forest biosphere and includes dense submontane tropical rain forest, montane and higher montane forest and alpine pastures. It mostly lies within the municipality of Petrópolis, with a small part in the municipality of Miguel Pereira. The area was originally set aside for fruit and wood production, but only 10% was exploited. The remainder is in excellent condition and provides a safe haven for many species typical of the Atlantic Forest of Rio de Janeiro.

== Administration ==
The 2,131 hectares (5,270 acres) Araras State Biological Reserve was created on 7 July 1977 by the State Department of Agriculture and Supply. The conservation unit is in the Central Rio de Janeiro Atlantic Forest Mosaic, created in 2006. On 10 March 2010 the reserve was expanded to 3,862 hectares (9,540 acres). The objectives are to preserve the remnants of Atlantic Forest in the Serra do Mar corridor, maintain biological diversity and provide a refuge for endangered species of flora and fauna. The reserve may only be visited for educational purposes or for research, subject to prior approval.

== Sources ==
- Costa, Cláudia; Lamas, Ivana; Fernandes, Rosan (December 2010), Planejamento Estratégico do Mosaico Central Fluminense (PDF) (in Portuguese), Reserva da Biosfera da Mata Atlântica, archived from the original (PDF) on 2016-10-07
- Reserva Biológica Estadual de Araras (in Portuguese), INEA: Instituto Estadual do Ambiente
