= Mata Paludosa Biological Reserve =

State biological reserve in Brazil

- Reserva Biológica Estadual Mata Paludosa
- IUCN category Ia (strict nature reserve)
- Location within Brazil
- Nearest city: Arroio do Sal, Rio Grande do Sul
- Coordinates: 29°30′32″S 50°06′50″W
- Area: 113 hectares (280 acres)
- Designation: Biological reserve
- Created: 23 October 1998
- Administrator: ICMBio

Mata Paludosa Biological Reserve (Portuguese: Reserva Biológica Estadual Mata Paludosa) is a state biological reserve in Rio Grande do Sul, Brazil.

== Location ==
The reserve, with 113 hectares (280 acres) in the municipality of Terra de Areia, was created on 23 October 1998. The purpose was full protection of its natural resources, especially examples of the forest fauna and flora in the remnant of Atlantic Forest. The reserve was in two parts, one west and the other east of highway RS-486.

Administration was assigned to the State Secretariat of Agriculture and Supply. The reserve was transferred to the municipality of Itati. On 13 September 2012 the reserve was expanded to include new areas of great environmental interest, to include springs on the slope area, and to adjust to the new route of the Rota do Sol highway. The reserve now covers 272 hectares (670 acres) in two parts, one of 205 hectares (510 acres) and the other of 67 hectares (170 acres).

== Environment ==
Mata Paludosa is the only conservation unit in the state that protects areas of transition between slopes and flat environments, with remnants of forest formed on very wet land, interspersed with wetland vegetation. It has large numbers of epiphytes, especially bromeliads and orchids. There are many palm trees, including the threatened Euterpe edulis, Geonoma gamiova and Geonoma schottiana. It serves as a refuge for fauna adapted to this environment.

== Sources ==
- Clara Weber Liberato (19 October 2012), Reserva Biológica da Mata Paludosa é ampliada (in Portuguese), Anama
- Governor of the State of Rio Grande do Sul (23 October 1998), Cria a Reserva Biológica Estadual Mata Paludosa e dá outras providências (PDF) (in Portuguese)
- Neemias Freitas (9 March 2015), Reserva Biológica Mata Paludosa tem regularização fundiária concluída (in Portuguese), Fundação Zoobotânica do Rio Grande do Sul
- Tarso Genro (13 September 2012), Decreto No 49.578 de 13 de Setembro de 2012 (PDF) (in Portuguese)
