= Duas Bocas Biological Reserve =

Protected area in Espírito Santo, Brazil

- Reserva Biológica de Duas Bocas
- IUCN category Ia (strict nature reserve)
- Location within Brazil
- Nearest city: Cariacica, Espírito Santo
- Coordinates: 20.274729°S 40.507749°W
- Area: 2,910 hectares (7,200 acres)
- Designation: Biological reserve
- Created: 2 January 1991
- Administrator: Instituto Estadual de Meio Ambiente e Recursos Hídricos

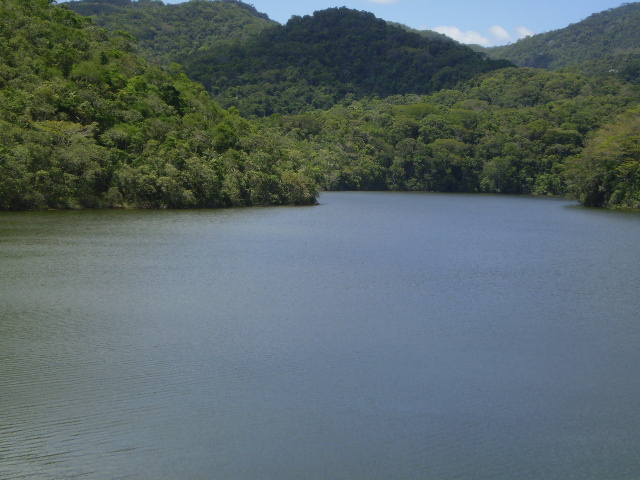
Duas Bocas Biological Reserve

The Duas Bocas Biological Reserve (Portuguese: Reserva Biológica de Duas Bocas) is a biological reserve in the state of Espírito Santo, Brazil. It protects an area of Atlantic Forest, the source of a drinking water supply.

== Location ==
The Duas Bocas Biological Reserve is in the municipality of Cariacica, Espírito Santo. It has an approximate area of 2,910 hectares (7,200 acres). The reserve contains the Duas Bocas Dam, inaugurated by President Getúlio Vargas, which impounds the Pau Amarelo, Panela and Naia-Assú rivers. It is part of the Duas Bocas - Mestre Álvaro Ecological Corridor. The main activities are school visits and scientific research.

The forest coverage has suffered in the past from human activities including banana and coffee cultivation and grazing. However, about 70% of the reserve is covered in primary Atlantic Forest. It is home to rich and diverse wildlife, including rare and endangered species. The cougar (Puma concolor) has been seen in the reserve.

== History ==
The Pau Amarelo Dam was built in 1912 to distribute water to Greater Vitória. From this date there was little human interference with the ecosystem to avoid polluting the drinking water. The Duas Bocas Dam was built 1949–54 to accommodate population growth, and still supplies water to some of the residents of the municipality of Cariacica. The Duas Bocas Forest Reserve was created on 12 January 1965 to protect the area.

On 2 January 1991 the level of protection was upgraded to biological reserve, with visits allowed only by permission of the Institute of the Environment and Water Resources. Its category was redefined through state law 4.503. It became part of the Central Atlantic Forest Ecological Corridor, created in 2002.

== Sources ==
- Lamas, Ivana Reis; Crepaldi, Maria Otávia; Mesquita, Carlos Alberto Bernardo (2015), Uma Rede no Corredor (PDF) (in Portuguese), Conservação Internacional (CI-Brasil), ISBN 978-85-98830-28-5
- Reserva Biológica de Duas Bocas (in Portuguese), SEAMA: Secretaria de Estado de Meio Ambiente e Recursos Hídricos, archived from the original on 2016-10-25
- Reserva Biológica de Duas Bocas (in Portuguese), Últimos Refúgios
