= Tuneiras do Oeste =

Coordinates: 23°49′S 52°55′W

- Municipality
- Interactive map of Tuneiras do Oeste
- Country: Brazil
- Region: Southern
- State: Paraná
- Mesoregion: Noroeste Paranaense

Population (2020)
  - Total: 8,533
- Time zone: UTC−3 (BRT)

Tuneiras do Oeste is a municipality in the state of Paraná in the Southern Region of Brazil.

The municipality contains part of the 8,716 hectares (21,540 acres) Perobas Biological Reserve, a strictly protected conservation unit created in 2006.

== See also ==
- List of municipalities in Paraná
