= Fontes do Ipiranga Biological Reserve =

Biological reserve in Brazil

- Reserva Biológica do Parque Estadual das Fontes do Ipiranga
- IUCN category Ia (strict nature reserve)
- Location within Brazil
- Nearest city: São Paulo
- Coordinates: 23.656°S 46.626°W
- Area: 357 hectares (880 acres)
- Designation: Biological reserve
- Created: 12 August 1969

Fontes do Ipiranga Biological Reserve (Portuguese: Reserva Biológica do Parque Estadual das Fontes do Ipiranga) is a biological reserve in the Fontes do Ipiranga State Park in São Paulo State, Brazil.

== Location ==
The Fontes do Ipiranga State Park is located in the south of the city of São Paulo. It holds the biological reserve, which preserves a remnant of Atlantic Forest vegetation and fauna, as well as the 36 hectares (89 acres) São Paulo Botanical Garden (Jardim Botânico de São Paulo).

The biological reserve covers 357 hectares (880 acres) of the 526.4 hectares (1,301 acres) state park. It contains rainforest vegetation mixed with Araucaria in various stages of succession.

== History ==
The State park has its origin in a decree of 12 September 1893 that declared an area of 696.9 hectares (1,722 acres) in the Ipiranga River basin was of public utility to protect the water supply of the city.

In the 1920s the Horto Botânico, now the Botanical Garden, was established in the park area.

During the 1930s the city's water supply was overhauled and the park was no longer a source.

The site went through a series of changes in use and administration over the years that followed.

The park was formally constituted by decree on 12 August 1969. The Água Funda Park was now called the Fontes do Ipiranga State Park. The decree defined a Biological Reserve area, Zoological garden, Botanical garden forest area and various open areas.

The Biological Reserve was to be kept intact as a scientific repository of the existing biota and to protect the historical headwaters of the Ipiranga River.

Minimal changes were allowed, including internal paths no more than 15 metres (49 ft) wide to be used only for scientific researchers.

The reserve shows evidence of human influences such as construction in the surrounding area, introduction of exotic species and deforestation. In October 2012 it was reported that the governor of the state was planning to build a concert arena, hotel complex and exhibition centre in the State park.

== Sources ==
- Jardim Botânico de São Paulo (in Portuguese), Estadão
- Paulo F. (2012-10-12), "Parque estadual em SP pode virar centro de exposições", GGN
- Pinto da Luz, Cynthia Fernandes; de Campos Bicudo, Denise; De Oliveira, Paulo Eduardo; Vieira Costa, Sandra; Araujo-Jesus, Tatiane; Albuquerque, Ana Luiza S. (2011), "A MATA ATLÂNTICA DO PARQUE ESTADUAL DAS FONTES DO IPIRANGA (SÃO PAULO, BRASIL) ENTRE O PASSADO HISTÓRICO E O PRESENTE" (PDF), XIII ABEQUA Congress - The South American Quaternary: Challenges and Perspectives
- Roberto Costa de Abreu Sodré (1969), Decreto nº 52.281, de 12 de agosto de 1969
