= Rio Formoso =

Municipality of Pernambuco, Brazil

- Municipality
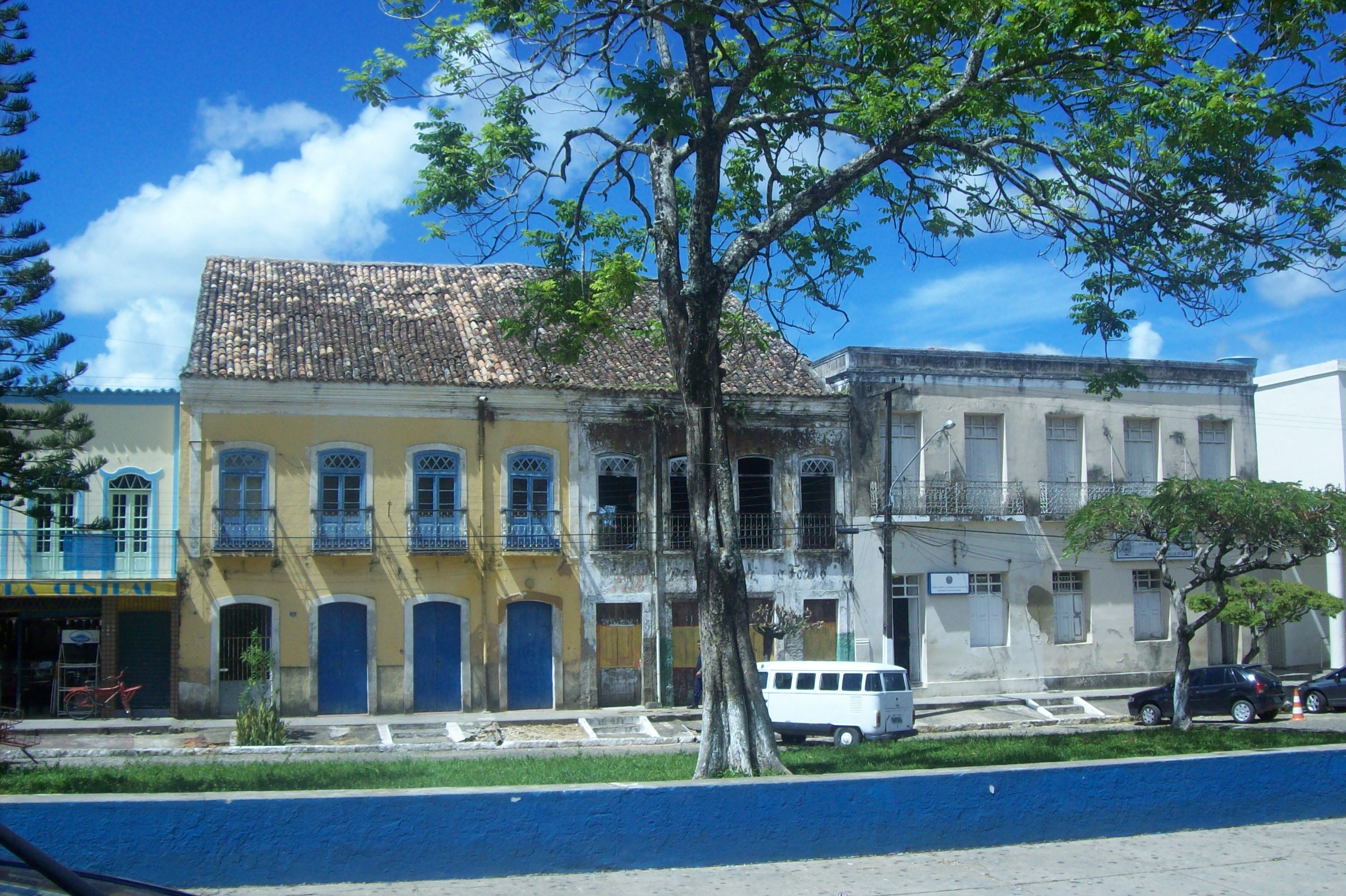
- Rio Formoso old Colonial Houses

- Flag

- Rio Formoso located in Brazil Map
- Coordinates: 8°40′S 35°09′W
- Country: Brazil
- State: Pernambuco
- Region: Zona da mata

Area
  - Total: 239.8 km^{2} (92.6 sq mi)
- Elevation: 5 m (16 ft)

Population (2022 Census)
  - Total: 20,009
  - Estimate (2025): 20,388
- Time zone: UTC−3 (BRT)

Rio Formoso (Central northeastern portuguese pronunciation: [ˈhiw foɦˈmozu]) (English: River Handsome), is a municipality in Pernambuco with 20,388 inhabitants (2025).

== Geography ==
- State - Pernambuco
- Region - Zona da mata Pernambucana
- Boundaries - Sirinhaém (N); Tamandaré (S); Gameleira (W); Tamandaré and Atlantic Ocean (E)
- Area - 239.8 km^{2}
- Elevation - 5 m
- Vegetation - Forest Subperenifólia
- Climate - Hot tropical and humid
- Annual average temperature - 25.2 c
- Distance to Recife - 91 km

The municipality contains part of the strictly protected Saltinho Biological Reserve, a 562 hectares (1,390 acres) conservation unit created in 1983.

=== Beaches ===
- Pedra beach and Reduto beach

There are the only two beaches in Rio Formoso. The major attraction is the estuary of the Formoso River. Has an extensive area of coconut trees, sand banks and natural reefs.

== Economy ==
The main economic activities in Rio Formoso are based in food and beverage industry and agribusiness. Especially, coconuts, sugarcane, and creations of cattle.

=== Economic Indicators ===
Population	GDP x(1000 R$).	GDP pc (R$)	PE
21.815	128.391	6.107	0.21%

Economy by Sector 2006

Primary sector	Secondary sector	Service sector
11.74%	40.87%	47.39%

=== Health Indicators ===
HDI (2000)	Hospitals (2007)	Hospitals beds (2007)	Children's Mortality every 1000 (2005)
0.621	1	65	34.1

== See also ==
- List of municipalities in Pernambuco
