= Carmo da Mata =

Municipality in Minas Gerais

Coordinates: 20°33′S 44°53′W

- Municipality
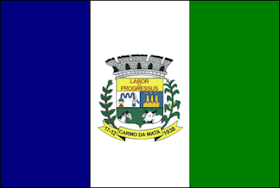
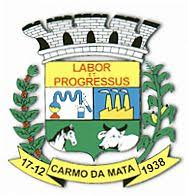
- Flag Coat of arms

- Location in Brazil
- Country: Brazil
- Region: Southeast
- State: Minas Gerais
- Mesoregion: Oeste de Minas

Population (2022 Census)
  - Total: 11,019
  - Estimate (2025): 11,291
- Time zone: UTC−3 (BRT)

Carmo da Mata is a municipality in the state of Minas Gerais in the Southeast region of Brazil.

The municipality contained the 86 hectares (210 acres) Carmo da Mata Biological Reserve. An audit in 2012 stated that some biological reserves created in 1974 on state-owned land no longer qualified as conservation units. These included Carmo da Mata, Colônia 31 de Março and others.

== See also ==
- List of municipalities in Minas Gerais
