= Saltinho Biological Reserve =

- Reserva Biológica de Saltinho
- IUCN category Ia (strict nature reserve)
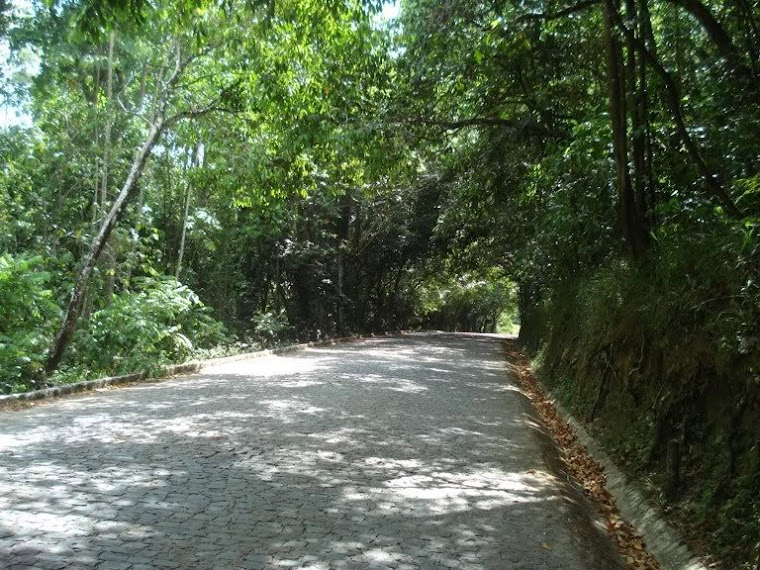
- Road in the reserve in April 2012

- Location within Brazil
- Nearest city: Tamandaré
- Coordinates: 8°43′34″S 35°10′44″W
- Area: 562 hectares (1,390 acres)
- Designation: Biological Reserve
- Created: 21 September 1983

Saltinho Biological Reserve (Portuguese: Reserva Biológica de Saltinho) is a Biological Reserve near Tamandaré in the state of Pernambuco, Brazil. It contains a sample of the tropical Atlantic Forest biome.

== History ==
The reserve lies in the Rio Formoso and Tamandaré municipalities of Pernambuco. The reserve, which covers 562 hectares (1,390 acres) of Atlantic Forest biome, was established on 21 September 1983. It is managed by the Chico Mendes Institute for Biodiversity Conservation. Objectives included protecting rare, endemic and threatened species of native flora and fauna, helping preserve and restore the Atlantic Forest in the state, and supporting scientific research.

== Location ==
The terrain is coastal plain of sedimentary origin, with small hills and ridges. Altitude ranges from 41 to 135 metres (135 to 443 ft). The soils are very deep and well-drained. The Saltinho river, after which the reserve is named, originates a few kilometres upstream from the reserve, and is dammed in the reserve to supply water to the city of Tamandaré. The average annual temperature is 25 °C (77 °F). Annual rainfall is 1,500 millimetres (59 in).

== Status ==
As of 2009 the Biological Reserve was a "strict nature reserve" under IUCN protected area category Ia, with a terrestrial area of 548 hectares (1,350 acres). Protected species include oncilla (Leopardus tigrinus), ocelot (Leopardus pardalis), the shrimp Atya scabra, and the birds Willis's antbird (Cercomacroides laeta), white-eyed foliage-gleaner (Automolus leucophthalmus), black-cheeked gnateater (Conopophaga melanops), rufous gnateater (Conopophaga lineata), blue-crowned motmot (Momotus momota), scalloped antbird (Myrmeciza ruficauda), great-billed hermit (phaethornis malaris), white-shouldered antshrike (Thamnophilus aethiops) and long-tailed woodnymph (Thalurania watertonii).

== Sources ==
- Rebio de Saltinho (in Portuguese), Chico Mendes Institute for Biodiversity Conservation, archived from the original on 2014-02-25
- Triana, Elisa (29 May 2009), "Strict Nature Reserves in Brazil", The Encyclopedia of Earth
- Unidade de Conservação: Reserva Biológica de Saltinho (in Portuguese), MMA: Ministério do Meio Ambiente
