= Tamboré Biological Reserve =

- Reserva Biológica Tamboré
- Location within Brazil
- Nearest city: São Paulo, Brazil
- Coordinates: 23°26′54″S 46°50′31″W
- Designation: Municipal Biological reserve

Tamboré Biological Reserve (Portuguese: Reserva Biológica Tamboré) is a municipal biological reserve in greater São Paulo, Brazil.

== Description ==
The reserve is in the Tamboré bairro of the Santana de Parnaíba municipality in greater São Paulo, and is owned by the municipality. With an area of 3,673,385 square metres (39,539,990 sq ft) it is one of the largest conservation areas in the metropolitan area. The Brookfield Institute, through an arrangement with the municipality, draws up programs and projects for the conservation of the reserve. The reserve includes conservation units within which human interference is not allowed other than to help conserve its natural balance, biological diversity and natural ecological processes. Visitation is allowed only for environmental education and scientific research.

== Sources ==
- O que é a Reserva?, Brookfield Institute, archived from the original on 2016-03-03
