= Ibirapuitã Biological Reserve =

Brazilian biological reserve

- Reserva Biológica de Ibirapuitã
- IUCN category Ia (strict nature reserve)
- Location within Brazil
- Nearest city: Alegrete, Rio Grande do Sul
- Coordinates: 29.925°S 55.782°W
- Area: 351 hectares (870 acres)
- Designation: Biological reserve
- Created: 27 June 1982

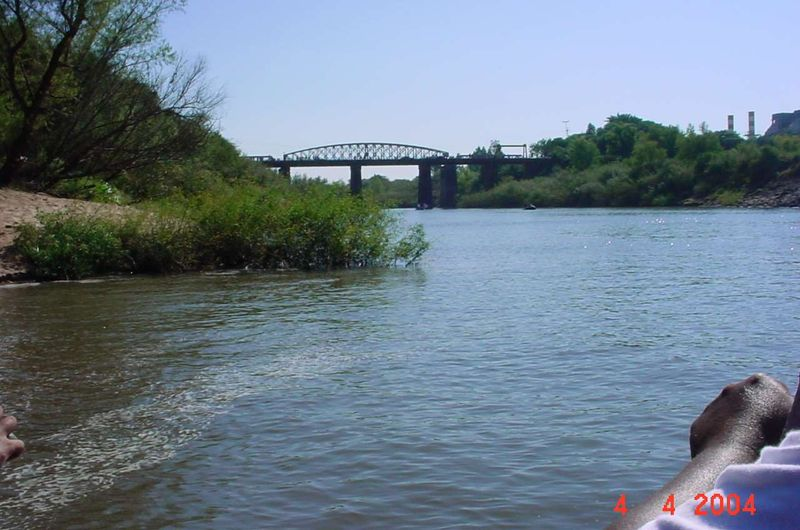
Borges de Medeiros bridge above the Ibirapuitã River

Ibirapuitã Biological Reserve (Portuguese: Reserva Biológica de Ibirapuitã) is a state-operated biological reserve in the State of Rio Grande do Sul, Brazil.

== History ==
The reserve was created by decree Nº 31.788 of 27 June 1982. It has an area of 351.42 hectares (868.4 acres) and lies in the municipality of Alegrete in the state of Rio Grande do Sul. The reserve lies in the pampas biome.

== Status ==
As of 2009 the State Biological Reserve was a "strict nature reserve" under IUCN protected area category Ia. The reserve is in the west of the state on the banks of the lbirapuitã River. It is the only area of full protection to preserve the native grasslands and riparian forest that are home to the black howler (Alouatta caraya). The area is mostly covered by grass species, with a few espinilho (Vachellia caven) and aroeira-pretas (Myracrodruon urundeuva). Riparian vegetation includes angico-vermelho (Anadenanthera colubrina ), camboim (Myrciaria delicatula), embira (Daphnopsis) and espinheira-santa (Maytenus ilicifolia). A new rodent species has been found in the reserve, a tuco-tuco that forms underground galleries.

== Sources ==
- Eridiane Lopes da Silva, O PAMPA E A APA DO IBIRAPUITÃ: ESTRATÉGIAS E AÇÕES PARA A SUSTENTABILIDADE (PDF) (in Portuguese), Área de Proteção Ambiental do Ibirapuitã, archived from the original (PDF) on 2016-08-07
- "Reserva Biológica de Ibirapuitã", Portal Uruguaiana (in Portuguese), archived from the original on 2016-08-09
- Triana, Elisa (29 May 2009), "Strict Nature Reserves in Brazil", The Encyclopedia of Earth
