= Vila Facchini Biological Reserve =

- Reserva Biológica Estadual Vila Facchini
- IUCN category Ia (strict nature reserve)
- Location within Brazil
- Nearest city: São Paulo
- Coordinates: 23.658°S 46.629°W
- Area: 70 hectares (170 acres)
- Designation: Biological reserve
- Created: 1965
- Administrator: ICMBio

Vila Facchini Biological Reserve (Portuguese: Reserva Biológica Estadual Vila Facchini) is a biological reserve in the city of São Paulo, Brazil.

The Vila Facchini Biological Reserve was created by decree nº. 45.803 in 1965. It covers 70 hectares (170 acres). It is in the municipality of São Paulo, and in 2003 was one of the conservation units that benefited from federal funding provided by ICMS Ecológico.

== Sources ==
- Respostas da Sociedade (PDF) (in Portuguese), Prefecture of São Paulo, 2 December 2004
- "São Paulo - SP Parques", Brazil Channel (in Portuguese)
