= Mogi-Guaçu Biological Reserve =

Biological reserve in Brazil

- Reserva Biológica de Mogi Guaçu
- IUCN category Ia (strict nature reserve)
- Location within Brazil
- Nearest city: Mogi Mirim, São Paulo
- Coordinates: 22°17′06″S 47°10′37″W
- Area: 469 hectares (1,160 acres)
- Designation: Biological reserve
- Created: 1942

Mogi-Guaçu Biological Reserve (Portuguese: Reserva Biológica de Mogi Guaçu) is a biological reserve located in the state of São Paulo, Brazil.

The reserve was created by State Law nº. 12.500 of 1942 with an area of 469 hectares (1,160 acres). The reserve is in the Martinho Prado Junior district of the municipality of Mogi Guaçu. It holds a research centre that investigates ecology, taxonomy, population genetics, physiology, biochemistry and other subjects.

The terrain is relatively flat, lying at 600 metres (2,000 ft) above sea level. Average annual rainfall is 1,335 millimetres (52.6 in). Average temperature is 20.5 °C (68.9 °F). Winters, from April to September, are dry.

== Ecology ==
The reserve contains one of the few remnants of cerrado in São Paulo State. Vegetation includes cerrado, riparian forests and fields.

It includes endangered species such as Aristolochia labiata, Eriotheca pubescens and the palms Acanthococos emensis and Euterpe edulis. Fauna include cougar (Puma concolor), giant anteater (Mymercophaga tridactyla), maned wolf (Chrysocyon brachyurus), black-collared hawk (Busarellus nigricollis) and red-winged tinamou (Rhynchotus rufescens). The black-fronted titi (Callicebus nigrifrons) occurs in the reserve.

== Sources ==
- Núcleo de Pesquisa Reserva Biológica de Mogi Guaçu (in Portuguese), Secretaria do Meio Ambiente do Estado de São Paulo
- Thornback, Jane; Jenkins, Martin (1982), Threatened mammalian taxa of the Americas and the Australasian zoogeographic, International Union for Conservation of Nature and Natural Resources, ISBN 2-88032-600-1
