= Ivaí River =

River in Brazil

Coordinates: 23°18′17″S 53°41′49″W

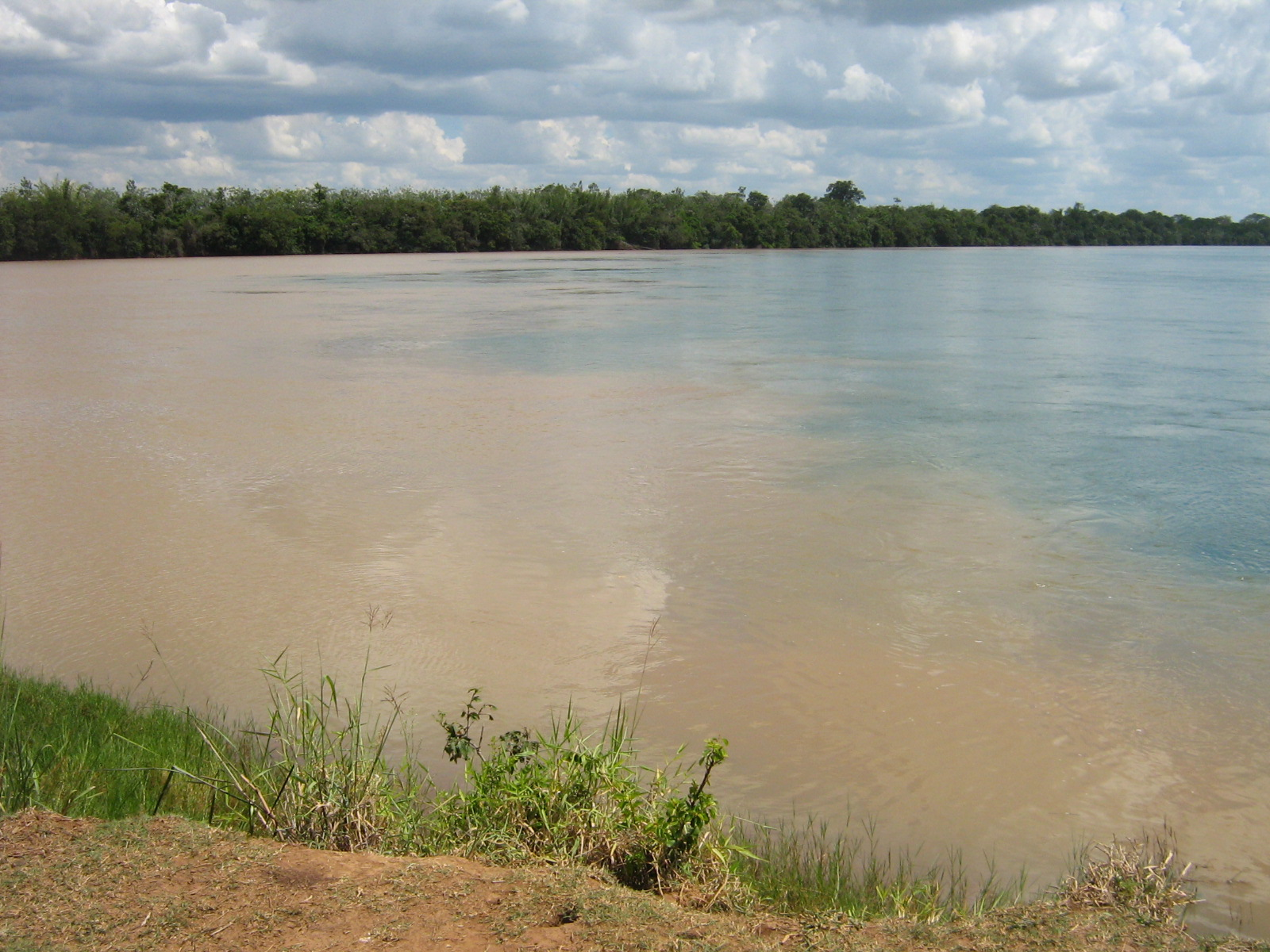

- Location within Brazil

Location
- Country: Brazil

Physical characteristics
- Source
  - location: Paraná state
- Mouth
  - location: Paraná River
- Length: 798 km (496 mi)
- Basin size: 36,587 km^{2} (14,126 mi^{2})
- Discharge
  - location: mouth
  - average: (Period: 1974-2008) 733.4 m^{3}/s (25,900 cu ft/s)

The Ivaí River (Portuguese, Rio Ivaí) is a river of Paraná state in southern Brazil. It is a tributary of the Paraná River. Its official spelling is Ivaí, with variants including Ivahy and Ival.

The river basin is ecologically very degraded, with fragile and vulnerable soil. It contains the 8,716 hectares (21,540 acres) Perobas Biological Reserve, a strictly protected conservation unit created in 2006.

== See also ==
- List of rivers of Paraná
- Tributaries of the Río de la Plata
