= Tamandaré =

Municipality of Pernambuco, Brazil

- Municipality
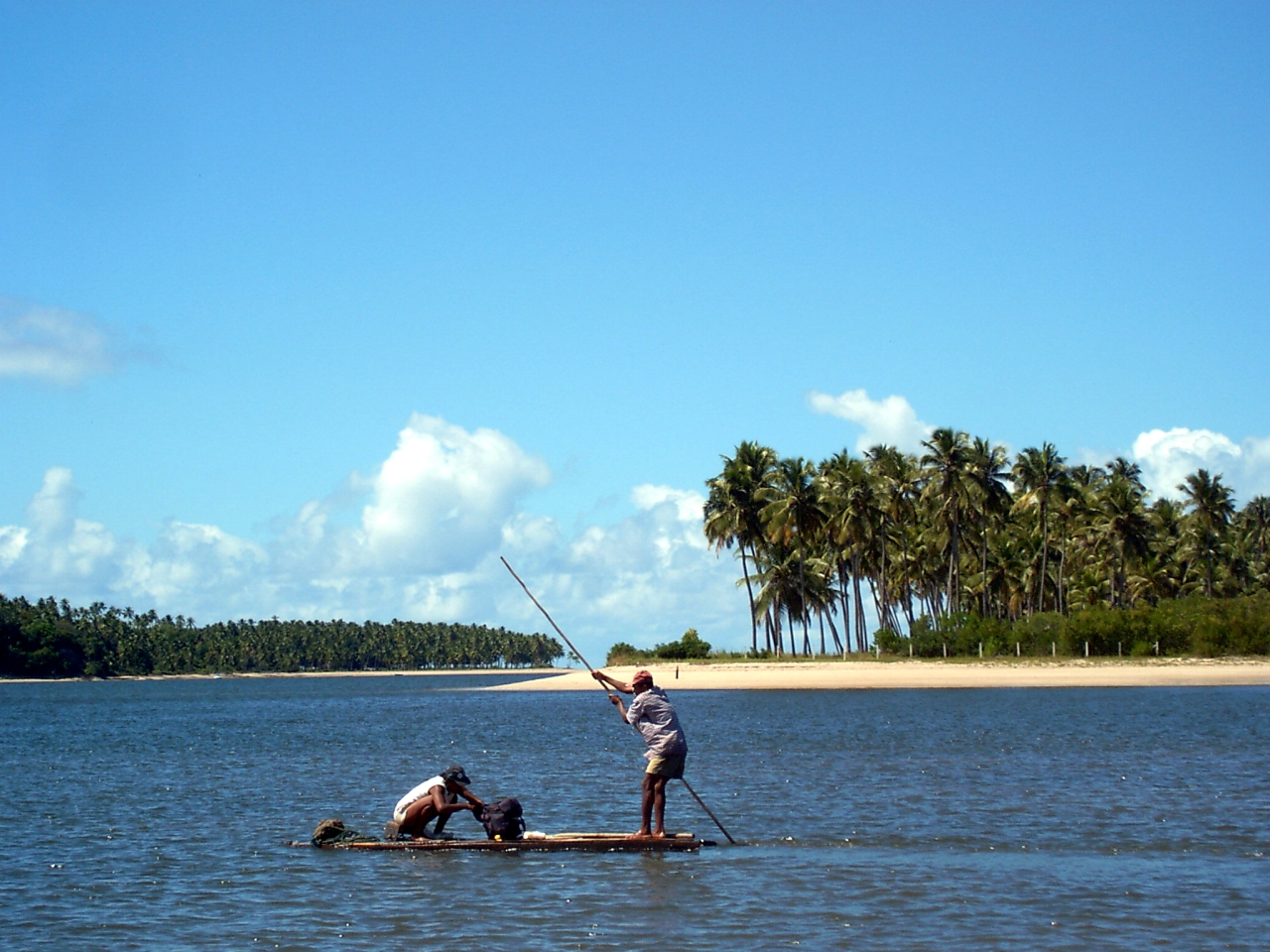
- Tamandaré Fishermen

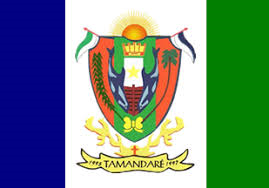
- Flag

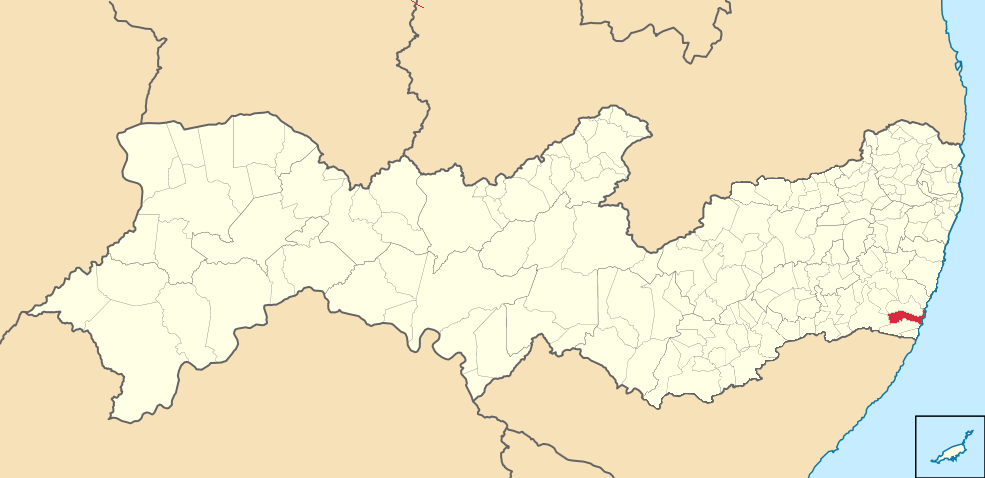
- Location in Pernambuco

- Location in Brazil
- Coordinates: 8.76°S 35.105°W
- Country: Brazil
- State: Pernambuco
- Municipality: Tamandaré

Area
  - Total: 190 km^{2} (73 sq mi)

Population (2022 Census)
  - Total: 23,561
  - Estimate (2025): 24,670
  - Density: 120/km^{2} (320/sq mi)
- Time zone: UTC−3 (BRT)

Tamandarë (Central northeastern portuguese pronunciation: [tɐmɐ̃dɐˈɾɛ]) (Brazilian Portuguese: Tamandaré; Old Tupi: Tamandûaré, lit. "different") is a coastal municipality about 103 km (64 mi) south of Recife, the capital city of the Brazilian state of Pernambuco.

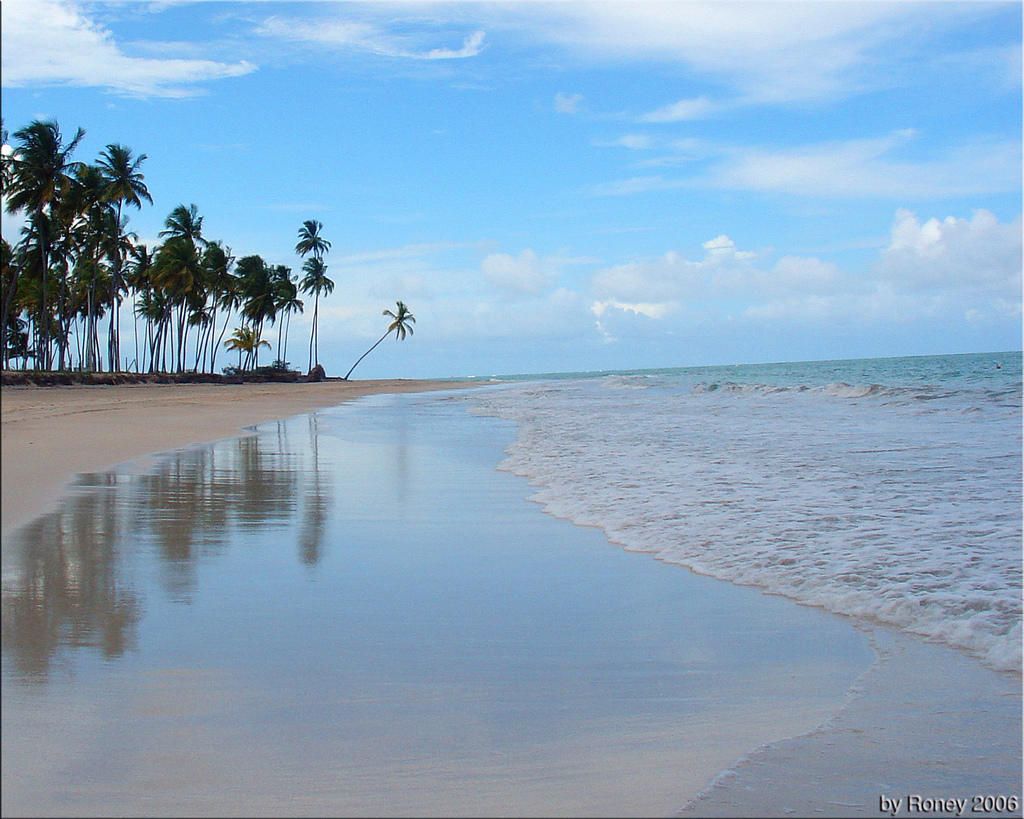
Tamandaré beach

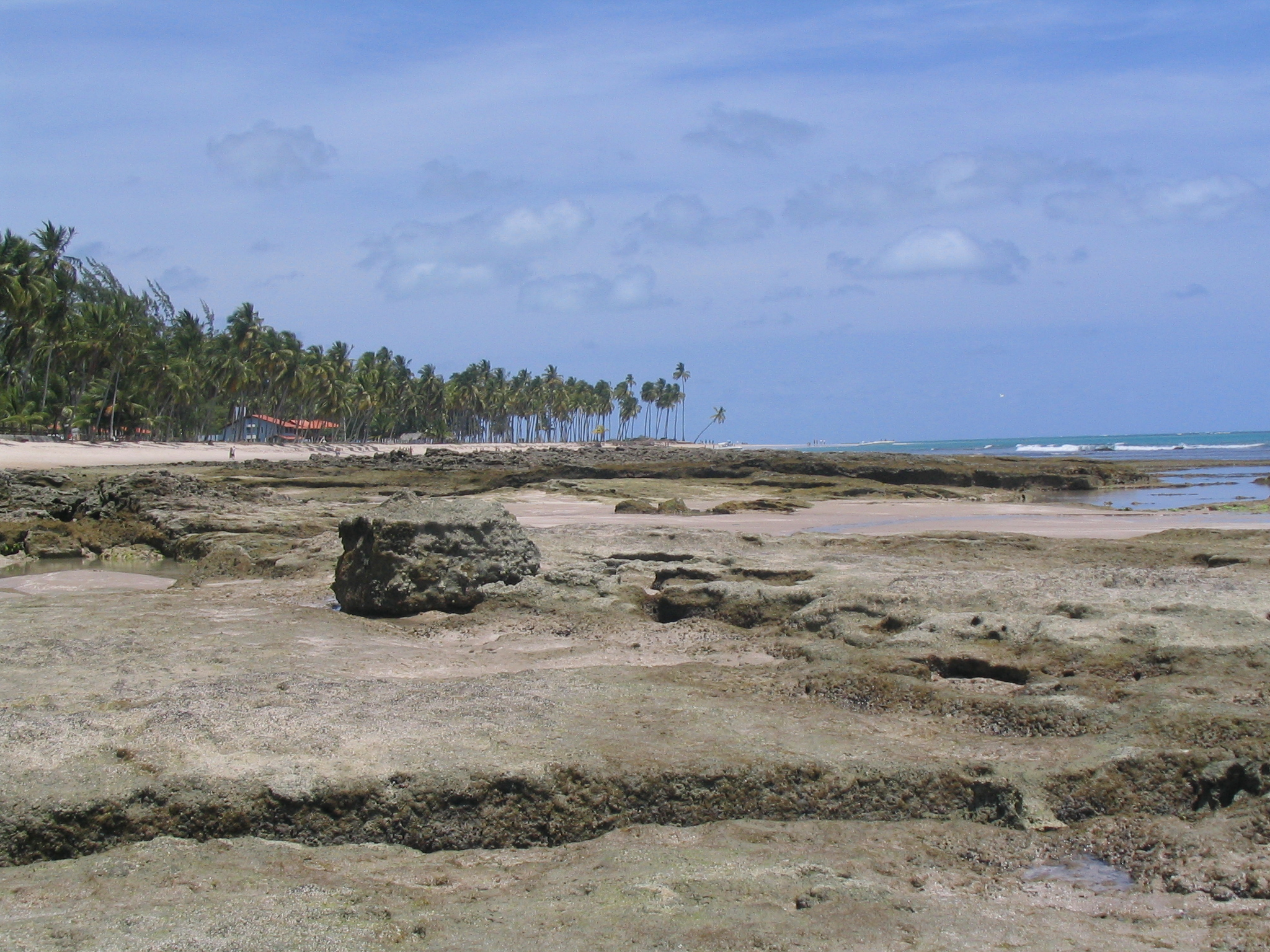

== Geography ==
- State - Pernambuco
- Region - Zona da mata Pernambucana
- Boundaries - Rio Formoso and Sirinhaém (N); Barreiros (S); Água Preta (W); Atlantic Ocean (E)
- Area - 190 square kilometres (73 sq mi)
- Elevation - 8 m
- Vegetation - Coconut trees and Atlantic forest
- Clima - Hot tropical and humid
- Annual average temperature - 25.3 c
- Distance to Recife - 103 km

The municipality contains part of the strictly protected Saltinho Biological Reserve, a 562 hectares (1,390 acres) conservation unit created in 1983.

== Beaches ==
- Tamandaré beach

Urbanized, has two kilometers long of sand and a number of tourist facilities. Has small waves and fine sand. Easy to reach from Recife and Caruaru.

- Boca da Barra beach

At low tide is formed natural pools. Suitable for swimming, has a dense mangrove vegetation in the estuary of Canoa quebrada River. It's possible to reach the Mamocambilhas beach in Barreiros by walking.

- Campas beach

Three kilometers long, is good for swimming, and in front of the Marinas hotel, the sea allows natural anchorages of boats. It is possible to rent equipment such as jetski, banana boats and boats.

- Carneiros beach

Still almost deserted, just has a few summer houses and bars. It has five kilometers of landscape mixed between the reefs, coconut trees and low waves water.

== Economy ==
The main economic activities in Tamandaré are based in tourism, artisanal fishing, food and beverage industry and agriculture especially coconuts.

=== Economic Indicators ===
Population	GDP x(1000 R$).	GDP pc (R$)	PE
18,999	79,461	4,381	0.137%

Economy by Sector 2006

Primary sector	Secondary sector	Service sector
7.44%	23.98%	68.58%

=== Health Indicators ===
HDI (2000)	Hospitals (2007)	Hospitals beds (2007)	Children's Mortality every 1000 (2005)
0.596	1	17	19.2

== See also ==
- List of municipalities in Pernambuco
