= Mogi Guaçu =

- Municipality
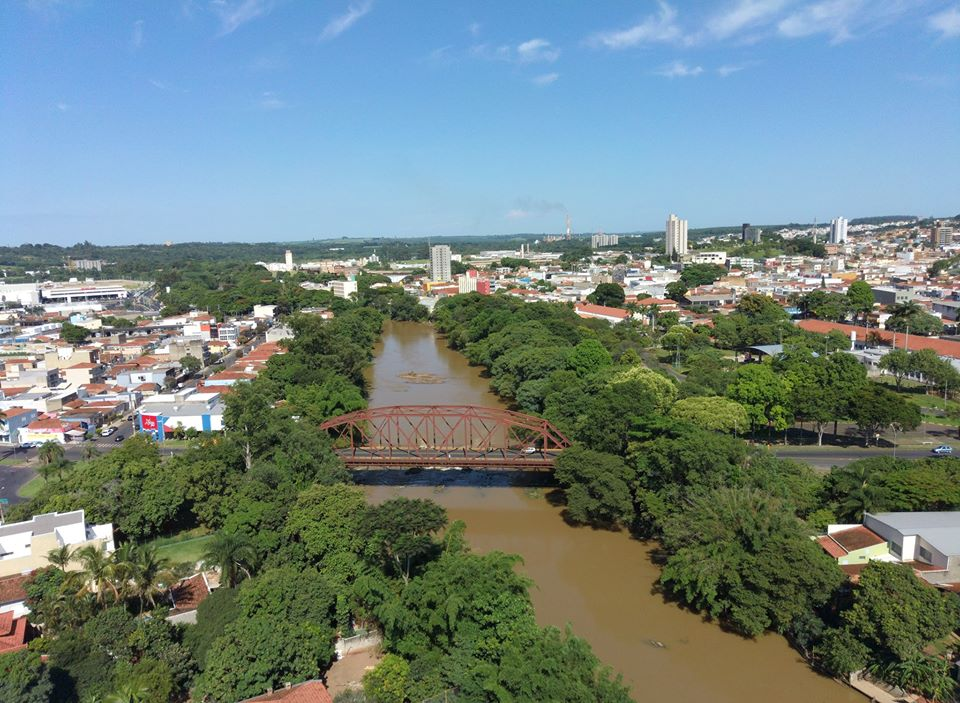
- Mogi Guaçu in January 2020 seen from the river.

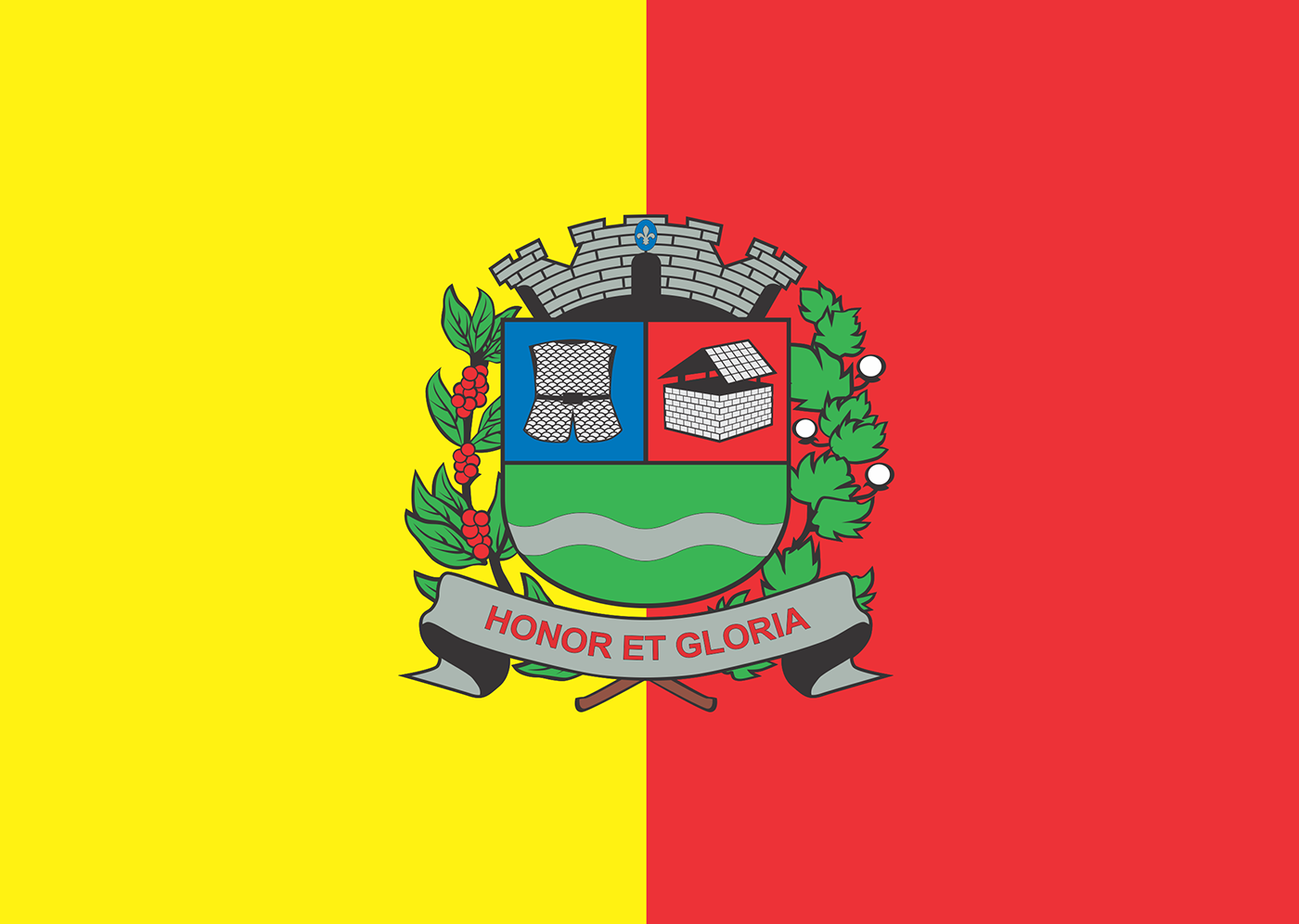
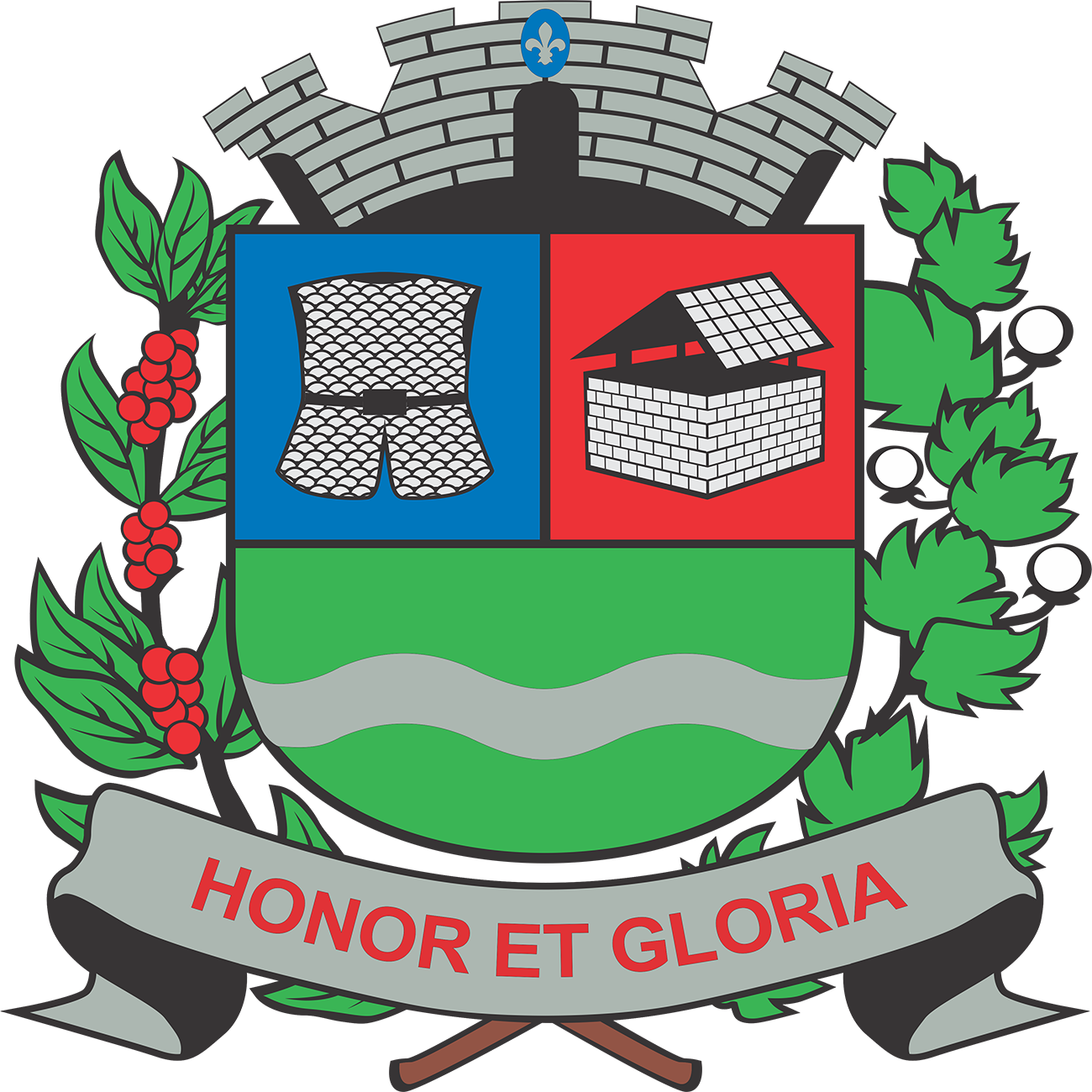
- Flag Coat of arms

- Location in São Paulo state

- Location in Brazil
- Coordinates: 22°22′19″S 46°56′31″W
- Country: Brazil
- Region: Southeast
- State: São Paulo

Government
  - Mayor: Walter Caveanha (2013–2017)

Area
  - Total: 812.753 km^{2} (313.806 sq mi)
- Elevation: 591 m (1,939 ft)

Population (2022 Census)
  - Total: 153.658
  - Estimate (2025): 160,318
  - Density: 189.06/km^{2} (489.7/sq mi)
- Time zone: UTC−3 (BRT)
- Postal code: 13840-000
- Area code: +55 19
- Website: www.mogiguacu.sp.gov.br

Mogi Guaçu is a municipality in the state of São Paulo in Brazil. The population is 153,658 (2022 Census) in an area of 813 km^{2} (314 sq mi). The city is at an average elevation of 591 m (1,939 ft) above sea level. Mogi Guaçu is a place name that probably originates from the Tupi language. It means "large river of snakes". The city was founded on April 9, 1877.

The municipality contains the 469 hectares (1,160 acres) Mogi-Guaçu Biological Reserve, a fully protected conservation area created in 1942.

The Autódromo Velo Città is a motorsport racetrack opened in 2012, located 20 km (12 mi) northeast of the city of Mogi Guaçu.

== Media ==
In telecommunications, the city was served by Companhia Telefônica Brasileira until 1973, when it began to be served by Telecomunicações de São Paulo. In July 1998, this company was acquired by Telefónica, which adopted the Vivo brand in 2012.

The company is currently an operator of cell phones, fixed lines, internet (fiber optics/4G) and television (satellite and cable).

== Sister Cities ==
- Estiva Gerbi, Brazil
- Itapira, Brazil
- Mogi Mirim, Brazil

== Climate ==
Climate data for Mogi Guaçu, elevation 639 m (2,096 ft), (2016–2021)
Month	Jan	Feb	Mar	Apr	May	Jun	Jul	Aug	Sep	Oct	Nov	Dec	Year
Mean daily maximum °C (°F)	31.7 (89.1)	31.4 (88.5)	31.5 (88.7)	30.4 (86.7)	27.6 (81.7)	26.9 (80.4)	27.3 (81.1)	28.2 (82.8)	31.9 (89.4)	31.4 (88.5)	30.6 (87.1)	31.3 (88.3)	30.0 (86.0)
Daily mean °C (°F)	25.9 (78.6)	25.6 (78.1)	25.1 (77.2)	23.5 (74.3)	20.4 (68.7)	19.5 (67.1)	18.9 (66.0)	20.0 (68.0)	23.5 (74.3)	25.0 (77.0)	24.5 (76.1)	25.6 (78.1)	23.1 (73.6)
Mean daily minimum °C (°F)	20.2 (68.4)	19.6 (67.3)	18.8 (65.8)	16.0 (60.8)	13.0 (55.4)	11.9 (53.4)	9.7 (49.5)	12.1 (53.8)	15.7 (60.3)	18.3 (64.9)	18.2 (64.8)	19.4 (66.9)	16.1 (60.9)
Average precipitation mm (inches)	220.8 (8.69)	182.6 (7.19)	154.1 (6.07)	65.1 (2.56)	57.5 (2.26)	37.1 (1.46)	9.9 (0.39)	35.2 (1.39)	30.9 (1.22)	138.4 (5.45)	166.6 (6.56)	198.8 (7.83)	1,297 (51.07)
Average precipitation days (≥ 1.0 mm)	18.0	14.2	13.3	6.7	7.2	5.8	2.7	5.8	6.3	12.0	12.7	15.5	120.2
Source: Centro Integrado de Informações Agrometeorológicas

== See also ==
- List of municipalities in São Paulo
