= Serra da Cutia National Park =

National park in Rondônia, Brazil

- Parque Nacional da Serra da Cutia
- IUCN category II (national park)
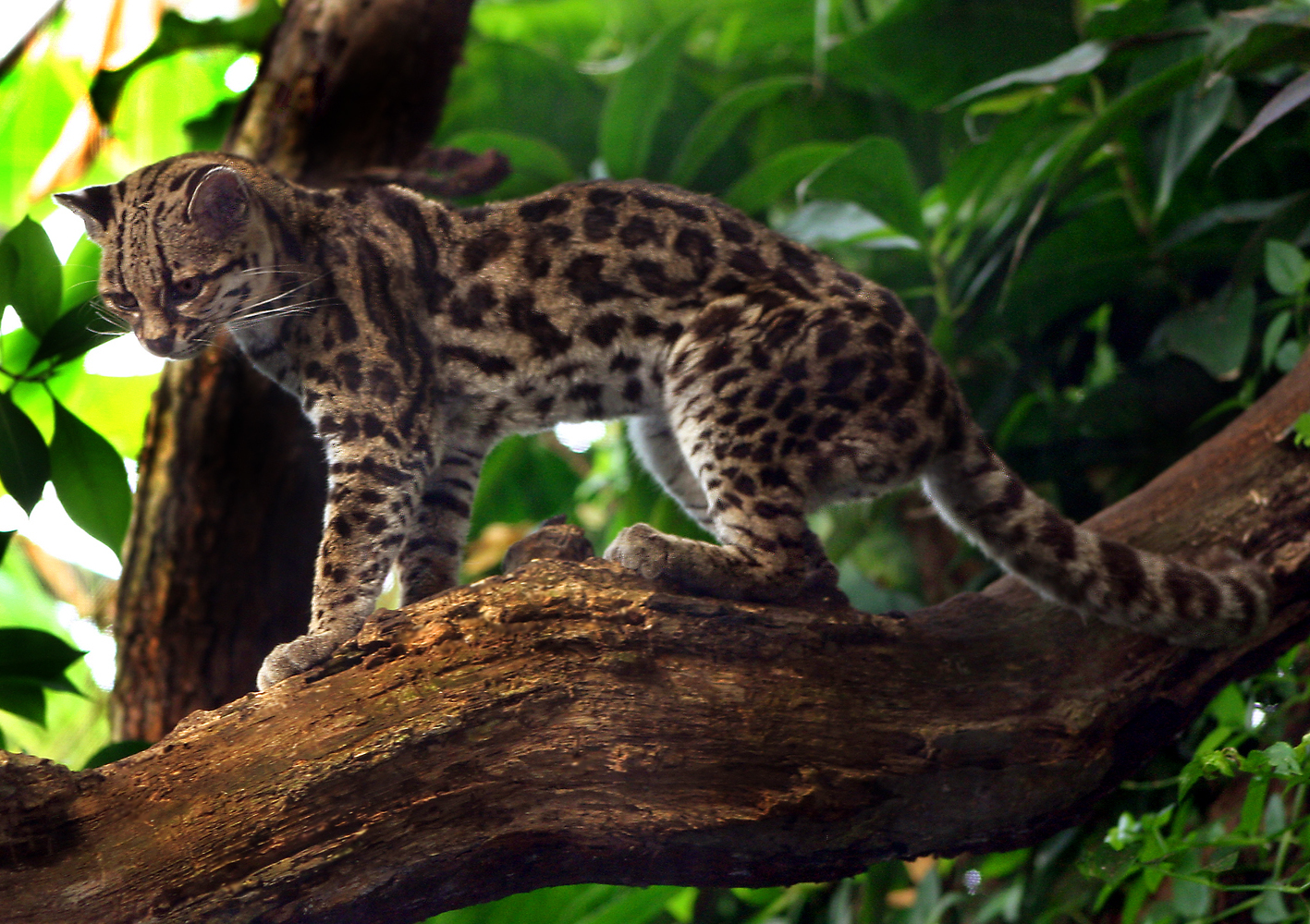
- Leopardus wiedii

- Location within Brazil
- Nearest city: São Francisco do Guaporé, Rondônia
- Coordinates: 11°42′29″S 64°23′35″W
- Area: 283,501 hectares (700,550 acres)
- Designation: National park
- Created: 1 August 2001
- Administrator: ICMBio

Serra da Cutia National Park (Portuguese: Parque Nacional da Serra da Cutia) is a national park in the state of Rondônia, Brazil.

== Location ==
The park is in the Amazon biome and covers 283,501 hectares (700,550 acres). It was created on 1 August 2001 and is administered by the Chico Mendes Institute for Biodiversity Conservation. It covers parts of the municipalities of Costa Marques and Guajará-Mirim in the state of Rondônia. Average annual rainfall is 1,502 millimetres (59.1 in). Temperatures range from 18 to 32 °C (64 to 90 °F) with an average of 26 °C (79 °F). Altitudes range from 140 to 525 metres (459 to 1,722 ft) above sea level.

== Fauna ==
There are 250 species of birds, 24 species of lizard, 14 species of snakes, two species of alligator, 41 species of amphibians and 143 fish species. The catfish Pimelodella is endemic. Medium and large mammals include giant anteater (Myrmecophaga tridactyla), brown-mantled tamarin (Saguinus fuscicollis), Peruvian spider monkey (Ateles chamek), tufted capuchin (Sapajus apella), bare-eared squirrel monkey (Saimiri ustus), Venezuelan red howler (Alouatta seniculus), brown titi (Callicebus brunneus), Rio Tapajós saki (Pithecia irrorata), margay (Leopardus wiedii), jaguar (Panthera onca), cougar (Puma concolor), giant otter (Pteronura brasiliensis), tayra (Eira barbara), white-lipped peccary (Tayassu pecari), collared peccary (Pecari tajacu), red brocket (Mazama americana), gray brocket (Mazama gouazoubira), black agouti, Dasyprocta fuliginosa, Central American agouti (Dasyprocta punctata) and Neotropical pygmy squirrel (Sciurillus pusillus).

== Conservation ==
The park is classed as IUCN protected area category II (national park). The purpose is to preserve an important area of Amazon rainforest and savannah, and to protect the sources that contribute to formation of the Cautário, Sotério and Novo rivers. It ensures environmental connectivity in the Guaporé River valley between Brazil and Bolivia. The park includes a mosaic of protected areas formed from several conservation units and indigenous lands, constituting the Guaporé/Itenez-Mamoré Ecological Corridor. The conservation unit is supported by the Amazon Region Protected Areas Program.

The area surrounding the park is inhabited by a community of settlers in the Surpresa district, extractive and indigenous communities. The park promotes sustainable development in these communities. Despite the difficulty of access the park and surrounding protected areas suffer from hunting, mining, deforestation and land seizure.

== Sources ==
- Full list: PAs supported by ARPA, ARPA
- Parque Nacional Serra da Cutia (in Portuguese), Chico Mendes Institute for Biodiversity Conservation, archived from the original on 2019-08-03
- Unidade de Conservação: Parque Nacional da Serra da Cutia (in Portuguese), MMA: Ministério do Meio Ambiente
