= Luiz Carlos Alborghetti =

Brazilian radio commenter, showman and political figure

- Born: Luiz Carlos Alborghetti; February 12, 1945; Andradina, Brazil
- Died: December 9, 2009 (aged 64); Curitiba, Brazil
- Other names: Cadeia, Dalborga, Charles Dal, Dal
- Occupation(s): police reporter, radio host, politician
- Years active: 1976–2009
- Television: Cadeia Nacional, Cadeia Sem Censura
- Spouse: Maria Auxiliadora Alborghetti
- Children: 4

State Deputy of Paraná
- In office 1 February 1987 – 31 January 2003

Personal details
- Political party: MDB, PMDB, PRN, PTB, PFL, Democrats

Luiz Carlos Alborghetti (February 12, 1945 — December 9, 2009) was a Brazilian radio commenter, showman and political figure. He was a Conservative voice on the radio. Among his program casting characteristics, he was notable for some peculiar details: reading glasses, a pen in-between the fingers of his right hand, a facial towel hanging on his shoulders and (mainly) his acid, challenging speeches (regularly full of physical and verbal profanity) and a solid wood club which he ostentatiously used to smack on anything near him (mostly his table) when angered. After several months off-work for health treatment, Alborghetti died of lung cancer in December 2009, ending a 33-year career on radio and television.

Born in Andradina, in the extreme west of the state of São Paulo, he moved to Rio de Janeiro at the age of sixteen to study. He started his career in 1976 in the city of Goioerê, Paraná, where he was host at the station Goioerê AM, owner of magazine and still worked in the extinct newspaper Folha do Vale do Piquiri. Later, he moved to Londrina, Paraná, to work in a radio with a police program with the name Cadeia (Jail), which talked about the crimes occurred in the city. Three years later, Alborghetti premiered a television show, also called Cadeia, initially for the city of Londrina, and was later expanded to the entire state of Paraná in 1982.

Alborghetti was a Paraná State Representative from 1986 to 2002.
