= Novo River (Rondônia) =

- Location within Brazil
- Native name: Rio Novo (Portuguese)

Location
- Country: Brazil

Physical characteristics
- Source
  - location: Rondônia state
- Mouth
  - coordinates: 11.226919°S 64.930381°W

The Novo River is a river of Rondônia state in western Brazil, a tributary of the Pacaás Novos River.

The river forms the northern boundary of the 22,540 hectares (55,700 acres) Traçadal Biological Reserve, a strictly protected area that was created in 1990.

== See also ==
- List of rivers of Rondônia
