= Imbituva =

Coordinates: 25°12′S 50°35′W

- Municipality
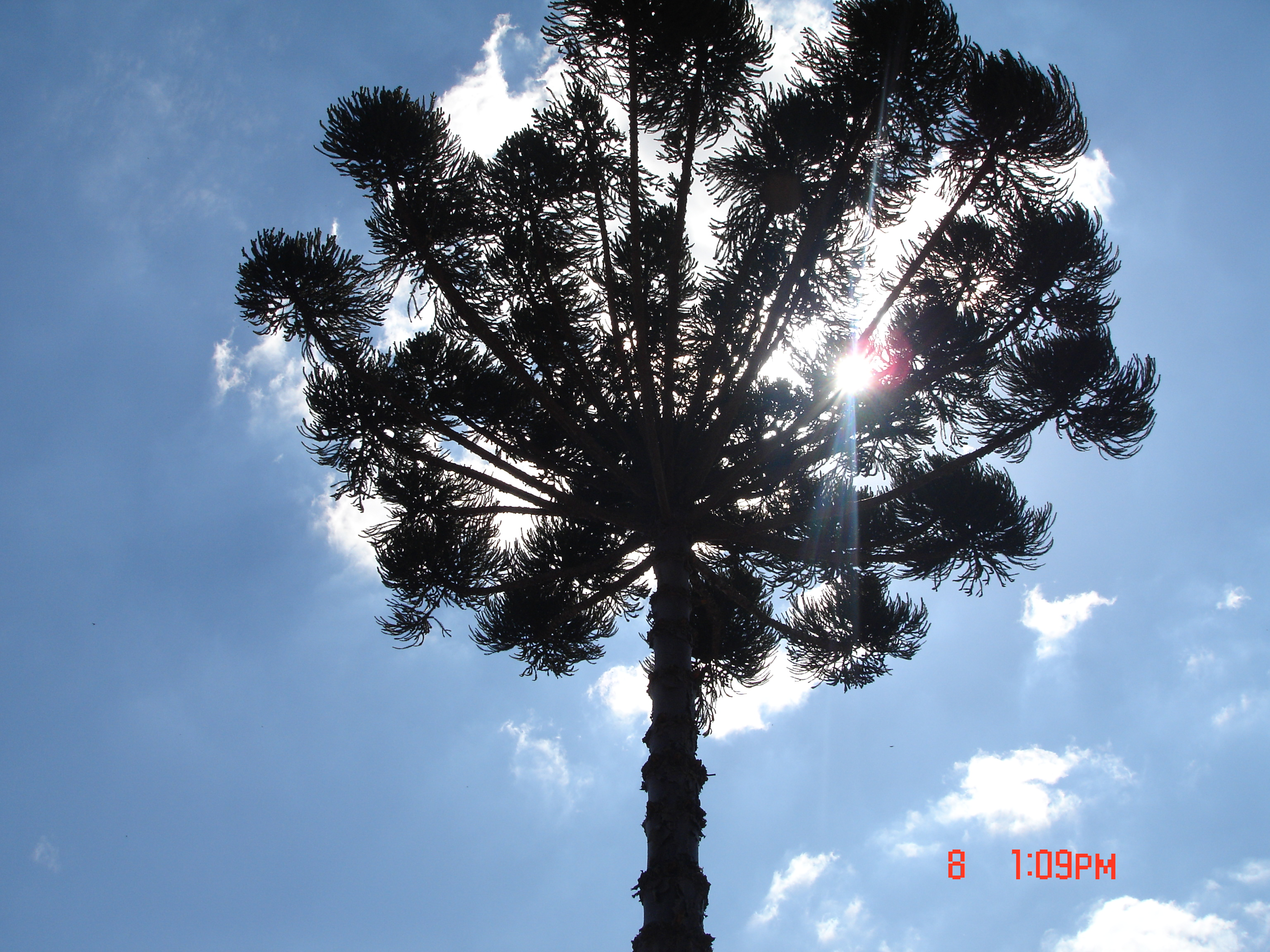

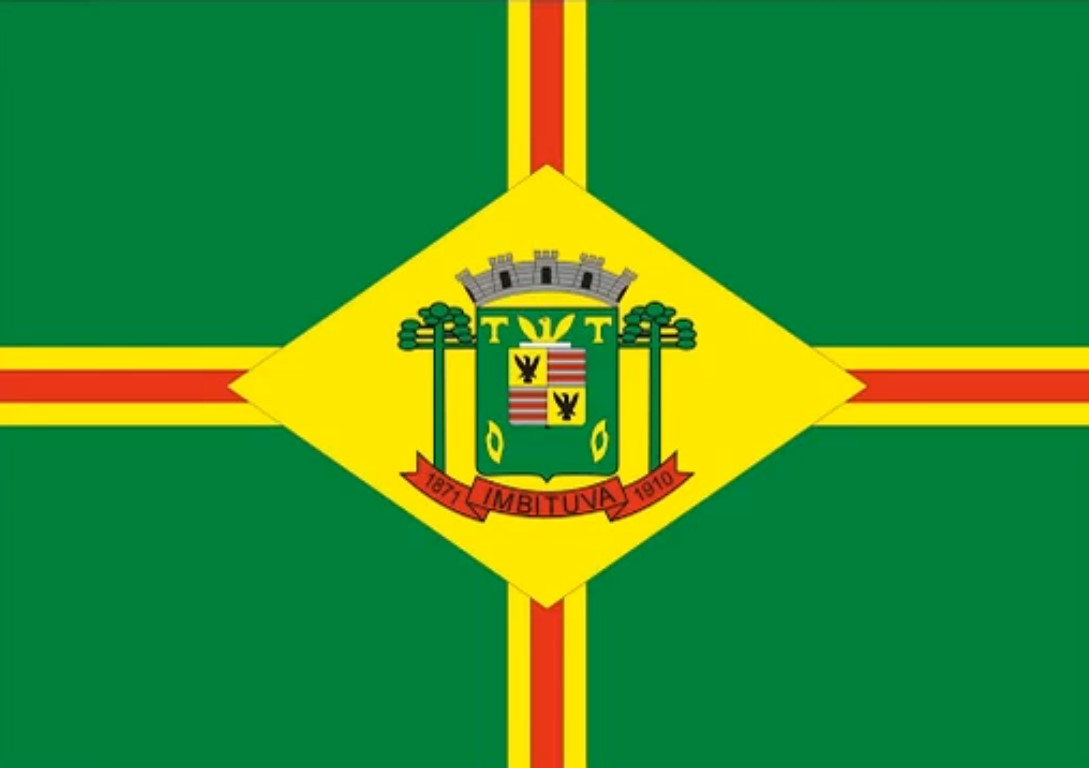
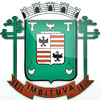
- Flag Coat of arms

- Country: Brazil
- Region: Southern
- State: Paraná
- Mesoregion: Sudeste Paranaense

Population (2020)
  - Total: 32,940
- Time zone: UTC−3 (BRT)

Imbituva is a municipality in the state of Paraná in the Southern Region of Brazil.

== See also ==
- List of municipalities in Paraná
