= Carmo da Mata Biological Reserve =

- Reserva Biológica Estadual Carmo da Mata
- IUCN category Ia (strict nature reserve)
- Area: 86 hectares (210 acres)
- Designation: Biological reserve
- Created: 23 September 1974
- Administrator: Instituto Estadual de Florestas – Minas Gerais

Carmo da Mata Biological Reserve (Portuguese: Reserva Biológica Estadual Carmo da Mata) was a state-level biological reserve in Minas Gerais, Brazil.

== History ==
The reserve was created by decree with Law nº 16.580 of 23 September 1974 and placed under the jurisdiction of the Instituto Estadual de Florestas (IEF). It covered 86 hectares (210 acres) in the municipality of Carmo da Mata. An audit in 2012 stated that a number of biological reserves created in 1974 on state-owned land were being re-assessed, since they no longer qualified as conservation units. These were Carmo da Mata, Colônia 31 de Março and others. As of 2016 the reserve did not appear on the list of biological reserves in the state.

== Sources ==
- Antonieta de Pádua Freire Jardim (2012), Relatório Final de Auditoria Operacional MEIO AMBIENTE – UNIDADES DE CONSERVAÇÃO DE PROTEÇÃO INTEGRAL (in Portuguese), TRIBUNAL DE CONTAS DO ESTADO DE MINAS GERAIS
- Camargos, Regina M. F.; Torrent Lanna, Mônica, "CADASTRO DAS ÁREAS NATURAIS PROTEGIDAS EM MINAS GERAIS" (PDF), Geonomos, 4 (2), archived from the original (PDF) on 2013-11-26
- Jose Marcio Ayres (2005), Os Corredores Ecológicos das Florestas Tropicais do Brasil (PDF) (in Portuguese), Sociedade Civil Mamirauá, ISBN 85-85924-12-8
- Reservas Biológicas de Minas Gerais (in Portuguese), IEF Minas Gerais, archived from the original on 2016-04-26
