= Quebrangulo =

Municipality of Alagoas, Brazil

- Municipality
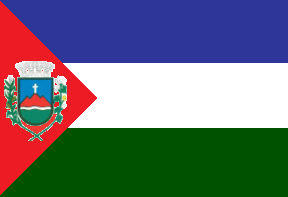
- Flag Coat of arms

- Location within Brazil
- Coordinates: 9.319°S 36.471°W
- Country: Brazil
- State: Alagoas
- Municipality: Quebrangulo

Area
  - Total: 300 km^{2} (120 sq mi)

Population (2020)
  - Total: 11,248
  - Density: 37/km^{2} (97/sq mi)
- Time zone: UTC−3 (BRT)

Quebrangulo (Brazilian Portuguese: /kebɾɐ̃ˈgulu/) is a municipality located in the Brazilian state of Alagoas. Its population was 11,248 (2020) and its area is 300 km^{2}.

The municipality contains part of the 4,382 hectares (10,830 acres) Pedra Talhada Biological Reserve, a fully protected conservation unit created in 1989.

== Notable people ==
- Graciliano Ramos, writer
