= Pedra Talhada Biological Reserve =

- Reserva Biológica da Pedra Talhada
- IUCN category Ia (strict nature reserve)
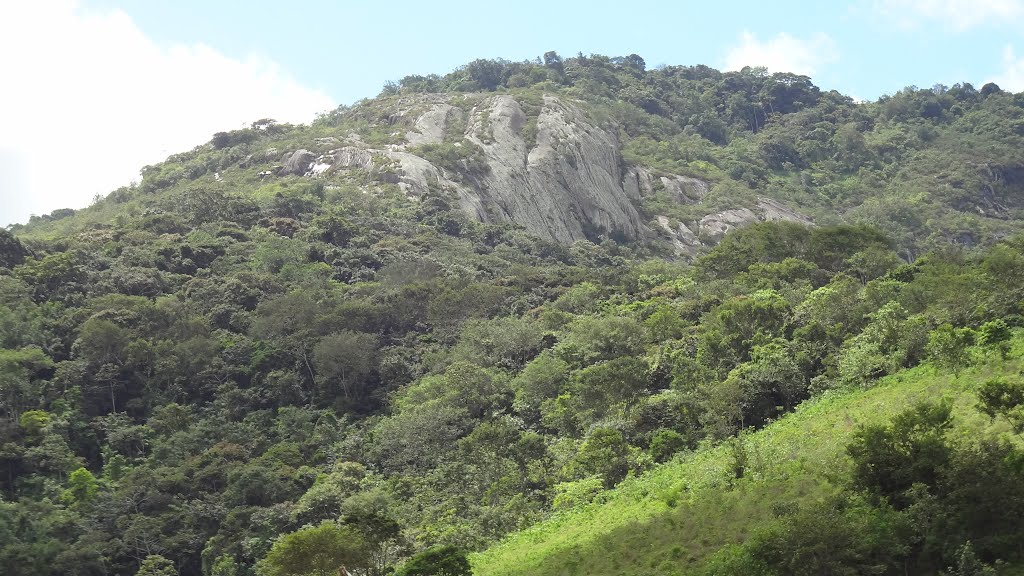
- Reserva Biológica de Pedra Talhada June 2012

- Location within Brazil
- Nearest city: Garanhuns
- Coordinates: 9°13′55″S 36°25′34″W
- Area: 4,382 hectares (10,830 acres)
- Designation: Biological reserve
- Created: 13 December 1989

Pedra Talhada Biological Reserve (Portuguese: Reserva Biológica da Pedra Talhada) is a federally administered biological reserve in eastern Brazil. It contains a remnant of the tropical Atlantic Forest biome.

== History ==
The Pedra Talhada State Park was created in 1985 to protect a representative sample of the remaining Atlantic Forest ecosystem in the Serras of Guaribas, Pedra Talhada and Serra do Cavaleiro. Due to lack of resources, the park was not implemented, and there was no protection against commercial forestry or subsistence cropping and grazing. To address the problem, the Pedra Talhada Biological Reserve was created on 13 December 1989 in the municipalities of Quebrangulo in the state of Alagoas and of Lagoa do Ouro in the state of Pernambuco. The reserve covers 4,382 hectares (10,830 acres) and is managed by the Chico Mendes Institute for Biodiversity Conservation.

== Environment ==
The region has a wet tropical climate with 1,250 to 1,500 millimetres (49 to 59 in) of annual rainfall. Temperatures are around 25 °C (77 °F) year round. The reserve has a rugged topography, with most of its terrain strongly undulating and hilly. The Lajeado dos Bois, at 860 metres (2,820 ft) has the highest elevation of the state of Alagoas. The reserve is in an Atlantic Forest transition zone with xerophilous deciduous forests, trees of 15 to 20 metres (49 to 66 ft) and savannah with thorny and deciduous vegetation. As of 2006 the park was still being used for subsistence crops and livestock, with fire used to clear the land and renew the pasture.

== Status ==
As of 2009 the Biological Reserve was a strict nature reserve under IUCN protected area category Ia, with a terrestrial area of 4,469 hectares (11,040 acres). Protected bird species are white-necked hawk (Buteogallus lacernulatus), rufous gnateater (Conopophaga lineata), scalloped antbird (Myrmeciza ruficauda), spot-winged wood quail (Odontophorus capueira), golden-spangled piculet (Picumnus exilis) and Alagoas tyrannulet (Phylloscartes ceciliae).

== Sources ==
- Helaeson de Almeida (November 2006), Plano Operativo de Prevenção e Combate aos Incêndios Florestais da Reserva Biológica de Pedra Talhada (PDF) (in Portuguese), archived from the original (PDF) on 2012-08-24
- Rebio de Pedra Talhada (in Portuguese), Chico Mendes Institute for Biodiversity Conservation, archived from the original on 2014-01-03
- Triana, Elisa (29 May 2009), "Strict Nature Reserves in Brazil", The Encyclopedia of Earth
