= Colônia 31 de Março Biological Reserve =

- IUCN category Ia (strict nature reserve)
- Area: 5,030 hectares (12,400 acres)
- Designation: Biological reserve
- Created: 23 September 1974
- Administrator: IEF Minas Gerais

Colônia 31 de Março Biological Reserve was a biological reserve in Brazil.

== History ==
The biological reserve was created by Law 16.580 of 23 September 1974 with an area of 5,030 hectares (12,400 acres) in the municipality of Felixlândia, Minas Gerais. An audit in 2012 stated that a number of biological reserves created in 1974 on state-owned land were being re-assessed, since they no longer qualified as conservation units. These were Carmo da Mata, Colônia 31 de Março and others. As of 2016 the reserve did not appear on the list of biological reserves in the state.

== Sources ==
- Antonieta de Pádua Freire Jardim (2012), Relatório Final de Auditoria Operacional MEIO AMBIENTE – UNIDADES DE CONSERVAÇÃO DE PROTEÇÃO INTEGRAL (in Portuguese), TRIBUNAL DE CONTAS DO ESTADO DE MINAS GERAIS
- Reservas Biológicas de Minas Gerais (in Portuguese), IEF Minas Gerais
- Reservas Biológicas – MG (in Portuguese), Secretaria de Estado de Meio Ambiente e Desenvolvimento Sustentável (Semad) Minas Gerais, archived from the original on 2016-04-26
