= Leopoldina, Minas Gerais =

Brazilian municipality

Leopoldina
- Municipality
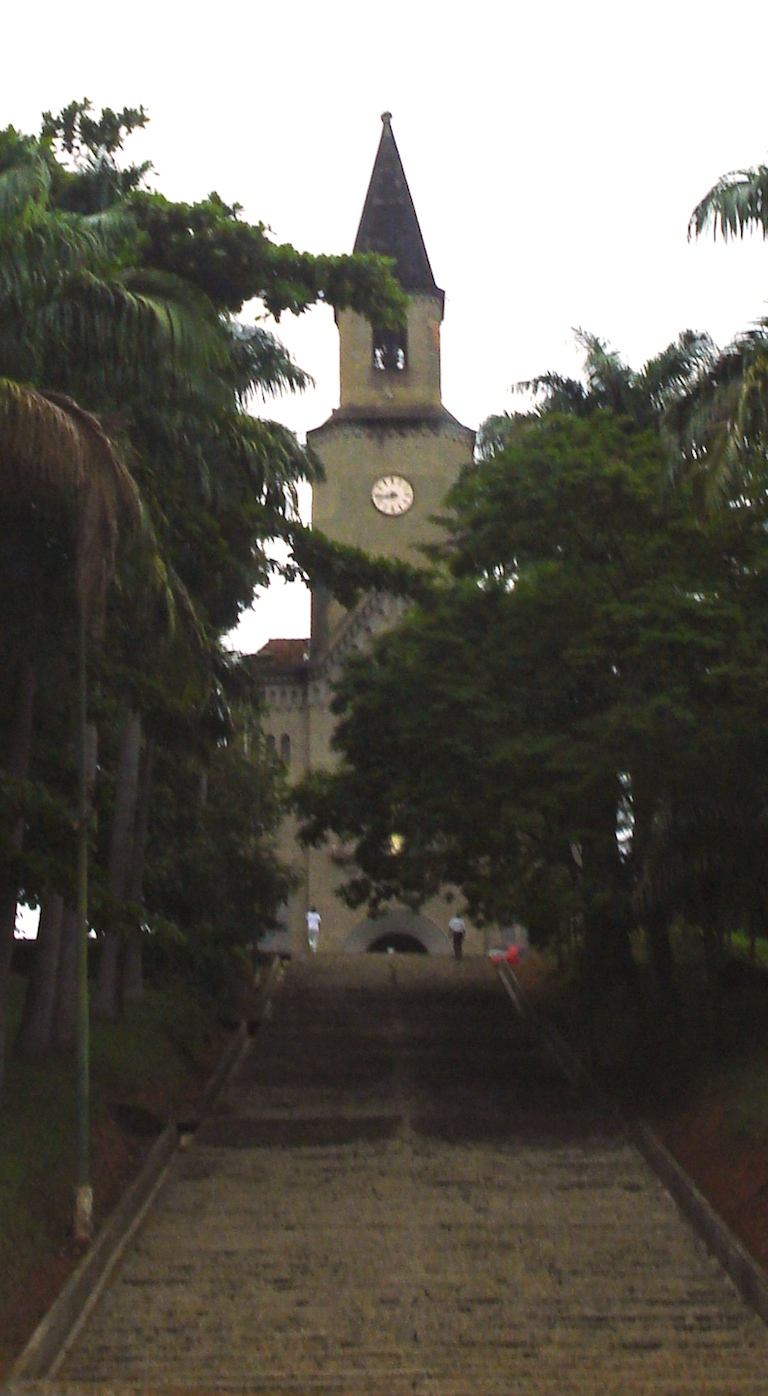
- Cathedral of St. Sebastian

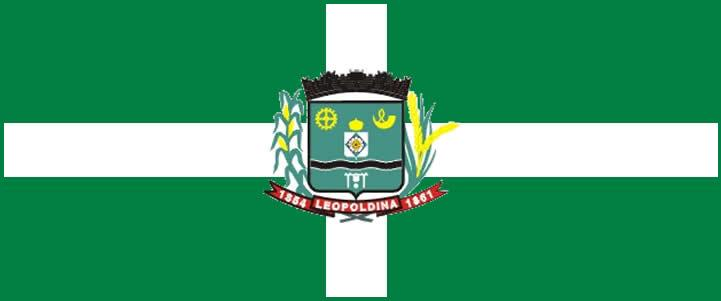
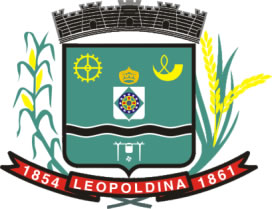
- Flag Coat of arms

- Location of the municipality in Minas Gerais

- Location within Brazil
- Coordinates: 21°31′55″S 42°38′34″W
- Country: Brazil
- State: Minas Gerais
- Mesoregion: Zona da Mata
- Microregion: Cataguases
- Founded: April 27, 1854

Government
  - Body: Municipal Chamber of Leopoldina
  - Mayor: Pedro Augusto Junqueira Ferraz (2021-2024)

Area
  - Total: 942.74 km^{2} (363.99 sq mi)
- Elevation: 225 m (738 ft)

Population (2020)
  - Total: 52,640
  - Density: 55.84/km^{2} (144.6/sq mi)
- Time zone: UTC−3 (BRT)
- CEP: 36700-000 to 36709-999
- HDI (PNUD/2010): 0,726
- GDP (IBGE/2010): R$ 567 947,947
- GDP per capita (IBGE/2010): R$ 11 106,62
- Website: http://www.leopoldina.mg.gov.br/

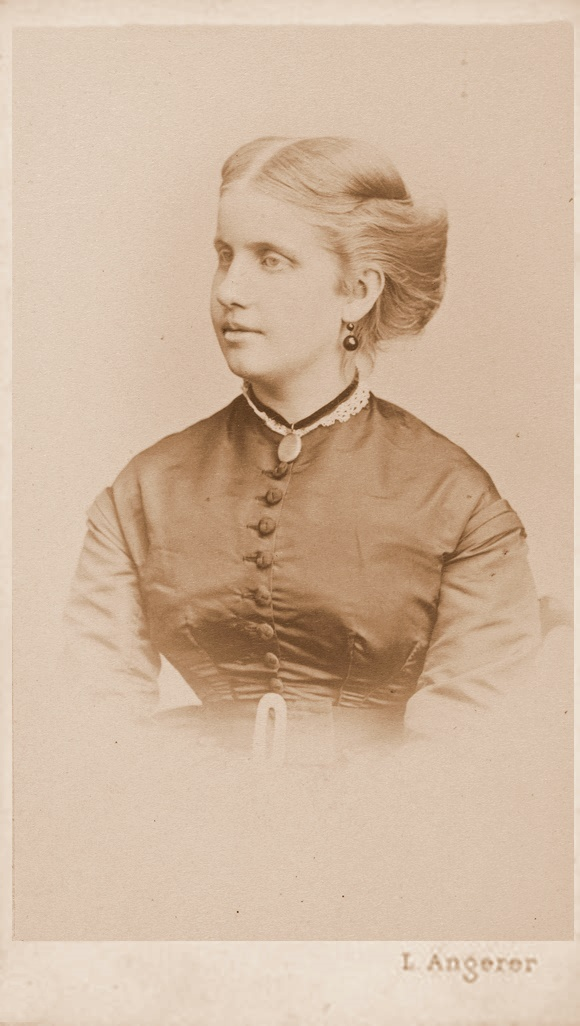
Princess Leopoldina de Bragança e Bourbon.

Leopoldina is a Brazilian municipality in the state of Minas Gerais. It belongs to the Zona da Mata mesoregion and it located 322 kilometers southeast of Belo Horizonte, the state capital. In 2022, its estimated population was 51 145 inhabitants, according to IBGE. Its territory covers an area of 943 km^{2}.

The municipal headquarters has an average annual temperature of 21°C and the vegetation is predominantly Atlantic forest. Regarding the automobile fleet, 16,575 vehicles were registered in 2012. The municipality's Human Development Index (HDI) is 0.726, classified as high.

The political emancipation of the municipality took place in 1854, and its name is a tribute to Princess Leopoldina de Bragança e Bourbon, daughter of Emperor D. Pedro II. Currently it is formed by the headquarters and the districts of Abaíba, Piacatuba, Providência, Ribeiro Junqueira and Tebas. The city, during the coffee cycle, was one of the most important in the former province of Minas Gerais. With the great economic crisis of 1929, the economy of the municipalities of Minas Gerais linked to coffee growing suffered a great impact. Nowadays, its economy is based on dairy farming, rice cultivation and the service sector.

Leopoldina has cultural, natural and architectural attractions, such as the Cathedral of St. Sebastian, the Espaço dos Anjos Museum, the Electricity Museum, the Maurício Hydroelectric Power Plant reservoir, the Cruzeiro Hill, among others. One of the main events that happen in the city are the Agricultural and Industrial Exhibition, the Feira da Paz and the traditional Viola and Gastronomy Festival of Piacatuba.

== Etymology ==
The toponym is a tribute to the second daughter of Emperor D. Pedro II, Princess Leopoldina de Bragança e Bourbon. The name was chosen when the town became politically emancipated from the municipality of Mar de Espanha in 1854. Before that, the area was a district called São Sebastião do Feijão Cru, in reference to both the patron saint of the place and the stream that crosses the territory.

== History ==
=== Origins ===
At the end of the 18th century, the gold production of the Captaincy of Minas Gerais went into decline. Some families left the villages in search of fertile land in other parts of the captaincy. They reached the forbidden areas of colonization, then known as Sertões do Leste, an extensive strip of Atlantic forest that extended from the Paraibuna River and the Royal Road to the Doce River; later, this region became known as the Zona da Mata.

In 1813, the first sesmarias in the territory of the current municipality, which belonged to the term of Barbacena, comarca of Rio das Mortes, were donated. However, the oldest references of residents date back to 1824. The first explorers established themselves with their families on the banks of the Feijão Cru Stream, where a troopers' settlement began to develop near a small chapel made of wattle and daub, erected in 1831 by farmers Francisco Pinheiro de Lacerda and Joaquim Ferreira Brito and dedicated to Saint Sebastian.

Until the arrival of the first landowners, the region was inhabited by the Puri indigenous people. These groups were entrusted with certain services, such as clearing the forest and harvesting the ipecacuanha, for which they were paid with cachaça. A considerable part of the Puri population was killed by the diseases brought by the invaders, such as measles, and the other part was expelled and had to leave for the province of Espírito Santo; by 1865, there were practically no indigenous people left in the area.

In 1831, the district of São Sebastião do Feijão Cru was created, as part of the municipality of São Manuel do Pomba, now Rio Pomba. In 1851, the district was transferred to the territory of Mar de Espanha, from which it was emancipated by provincial law No. 666 of April 27, 1854, creating the municipality of Vila Leopoldina. The same law transferred some districts dismembered from the territory of Presídio, now Visconde do Rio Branco, to Leopoldina. At that time, the municipality had a population of 23,000 inhabitants.

The formation of the village began around the Rosário Square, from where the streets of Rosário (now Tiradentes Street), Direita (now Gabriel Magalhães Street) and Riachuelo (now Joaquim Ferreira Brito Street) left, constituting the oldest roads in the city.

=== The coffee cycle ===
Coffee growing developed in the province of Rio de Janeiro crossed the Paraíba do Sul river and spread into the Zona da Mata through the valleys of the Paraibuna, Pirapetinga and Pomba rivers, leading to a fast growth of the area in the second half of the 19th century. Vila Leopoldina was elevated to the category of city by provincial law No. 1116 of October 16, 1861. At that time, Latin and French were already taught in the locality. In 1872, by provincial law no. 1867, Leopoldina became the seat of a district.

The municipality also benefited from the construction of the Leopoldina Railroad, whose tracks reached the city in 1877. Through the railroad, trade with Rio de Janeiro, capital of the Empire, was carried out. In 1879, the first newspaper of the municipality was founded, called Leopoldinense. In April 1881, Leopoldina was visited by Emperor Pedro II.

In 1883, Leopoldina had the second largest slave population in the province of Minas Gerais, behind only Juiz de Fora. Between the last decade of the 19th century and the first decade of the 20th century, European immigrants arrived in Leopoldina to work in the coffee plantations. An immigrant hostel operated in the town until 1898. In 1910, the Constança Colony was created in the district of Tebas for immigrants, mainly Italians.

On September 2, 1906, in the district of Piacatuba, the cornerstone of Mauricio Hydroelectric Power Plant was laid, the first hydroelectric power plant built in the region, to exploit the hydraulic potential of the Cachoeira da Fumaça, on the Novo River. Two years later, on July 16, 1908, the electric power arrived in the city. Also in 1906, the Leopoldinense Gymnasium was founded, which from 1912 onwards offered technical education at the Agricultural School and higher education at the School of Pharmacy and Dentistry. Between 1911 and 1912, the Banco Ribeiro Junqueira and the Zonna da Matta construction company were founded in the town. The coffee crisis at the beginning of the 20th century, however, caused serious changes in the economy of the Zona da Mata and the municipality, which began to rely on dairy farming and rice cultivation.

In the period between the First Republic and the military coup of 1964, some political leaders of Leopoldina achieved projection in Minas Gerais and Brazil, such as Senator Ribeiro Junqueira, Governor Clóvis Salgado and President Carlos Luz. The Rio-Bahia Highway, inaugurated in 1963, benefited the industrialization of the municipality and strengthened it as a communications junction.

=== Administrative division ===
Emancipated from Mar de Espanha in 1854, the municipality was installed on January 20, 1855 covering nine districts: Leopoldina (headquarters), Capivara, Conceição da Boa Vista, Laranjal, Madre de Deus do Angu, Nossa Senhora da Piedade, Bom Jesus do Rio Pardo, Santa Rita do Meia Pataca and São José do Paraíba. Since then, new districts have been created and others emancipated to constitute the municipalities of Cataguases, Além Paraíba and Recreio. The last dismemberment occurred by state law No. 2764 of 1962, which emancipated the district of Rio Pardo to create the municipality of Argirita. Currently, the municipality is formed by six districts: Leopoldina, Abaíba, Piacatuba, Providência, Ribeiro Junqueira and Tebas.

== Geography ==
Leopoldina is located in the Zona da Mata mesoregion and occupies an area of 942 km^{2}, which makes it the most extensive of its micro-region, representing 0.161% of the state of Minas Gerais, 0.102% of the Southeast Region and 0.011% of the entire Brazilian territory. It borders Cataguases to the north, Laranjal to the northeast, Recreio to the east, Pirapetinga and Estrela Dalva to the southeast, Volta Grande and Além Paraíba to the south, Santo Antônio do Aventureiro to the southwest, Argirita and São João Nepomuceno to the west, and Descoberto and Itamarati de Minas to the northwest.

=== Landform and hydrography ===
The territory of Leopoldina is located in the Paraíba do Sul River Basin, and the municipal headquarters is crossed by the Feijão Cru Stream. The main rivers that flow through the municipality are the Pomba and Pirapetinga, both tributaries of the Paraíba do Sul, and the Pardo and Novo rivers, tributaries of the Pomba.

About 80% of the municipality has topography ranging from undulating to hilly and only 20% classified as plain. The altitude of the municipal headquarters is 225 meters; Alto de Santa Úrsula, the highest point of the municipality, has an altitude of 712 meters.

=== Climate ===
Leopoldina

Climate chart (precipitation, max. and min. temperature)
J	F	M	A	M	J	J	A	S	O	N	D
220 29 19	176 29 20	147 29 19	68 27 17	35 27 15	24 24 13	14 24 12	17 25 13	44 25 14	121 27 17	162 28 18	277 28 19
- █ Average max. and min. temperatures in °C
- █ Precipitation totals in mm
- Source: Tempo Agora
Imperial conversion
J	F	M	A	M	J	J	A	S	O	N	D
8.7 84 66	6.9 84 68	5.8 84 66	2.7 81 63	1.4 81 59	0.9 75 55	0.6 75 54	0.7 77 55	1.7 77 57	4.8 81 63	6.4 82 64	11 82 66
- █ Average max. and min. temperatures in °F
- █ Precipitation totals in inches

The climate of Leopoldina is tropical (type Aw according to Köppen), with an average annual temperature of around 21 °C, dry and mild winters and rainy summers with moderately high temperatures. The warmest months are January, February and March, with an average maximum temperature of 29 °C; in February 2003, a peak temperature of 35 °C was recorded. July is the coldest month, with an average minimum temperature of 12 °C; in July 2003, a low of 9 °C was recorded.

The average annual rainfall is 1,307 mm. The highest rainfall is recorded in the period from October to March, with the winter months characterized by drought. On average, July is the driest month, when only 14.2 mm are recorded, and December is the wettest month, with an average of 277.1 mm.

=== Vegetation and soil use ===
The native vegetation of the municipality is the seasonal semideciduous forest, a part of the Atlantic forest biome, which has been severely deforested. Currently, the seasonal forest occupies an area of 7144 hectares in the territory. Today, most of Leopoldina's area is covered by fields and pastures, which occupy 79,308 hectares. It has two environmental conservation units: the Antônio Andrade Ribeiro Municipal Park, with an area of 31.93 hectares, and the Lapinha Biological Reserve, with 368 hectares.

=== Demography ===
Total population of the municipality
Year	Population
2010	51.136
2000	50.041
1991	46.442
1980	42.118
1970	41.306

In 2010, the population of Leopoldina was estimated by the Brazilian Institute of Geography and Statistics (IBGE) at 51,136 inhabitants, with a population density of 54.27 inhabitants per km^{2}. According to the 2010 census, 47.99% of the population were men (24 545 inhabitants), 52.01% women (26 591 inhabitants), 89.39% (45 712 inhabitants) lived in the urban area and 10.61% (5 424 inhabitants) in the rural area. Also according to the IBGE, Leopoldina had 37 685 voters in 2006.

The Municipal Human Development Index (HDI-M) of Leopoldina is considered average by the United Nations Development Program (UNDP). Its value is 0.778, being the 122nd highest in the entire state of Minas Gerais (out of 853), the 487th of the entire Southeast Region of Brazil (out of 1666 municipalities) and the 1098th of all Brazil (out of 5 507 municipalities). Considering only education (MHDI-E), the index value is 0.854, while Brazil's is 0.849. The longevity index (MHDI-L) is 0.789 (the Brazilian is 0.638) and the income index is 0.691 (Brazil is 0.723). The per capita income is 8,994.55 reais, the adult literacy rate is 89.56% and life expectancy is 72.35 years. According to IBGE, the Gini coefficient, which measures social inequality, is 0.45, with 1.00 being the worst number and 0.00 the best. The incidence of poverty, measured by IBGE, is 30.46%, the lower limit of poverty incidence is 22.02%, the upper limit is 38.90% and the incidence of subjective poverty is 26.38%.

== Politics ==
Local administration is carried out by the executive and legislative branches. The first representative of the executive power and mayor of the municipality was Francisco Andrade Bastos, whose mandate lasted from 1937 to 1945. In twenty mandates, thirteen mayors have passed through the City Hall of Leopoldina. The current mayor of the city is Pedro Augusto Junqueira Ferraz (PL), elected with 31.30% of the valid votes (8,926 votes). The legislative branch is made up of the Chamber of Deputies, composed of 15 councillors elected for four-year terms. Leopoldina is also the seat of a comarca, whose territory also includes the municipalities of Recreio and Argirita.

== Neighborhoods ==
- Alto da Ventania
- Alto da Boa Vista(Solar Leopoldina)
- Alto do Cemitério
- Arrasta Couro
- Arthur Leão
- Bandeirantes
- Bela Vista
- Boa Sorte
- Caiçaras
- Canto dos Ferreiras
- Catedral
- Centro
- Chácara Dona Euzébia
- Cidade Alta
- Cohab Nova
- Cohab Velha Maria Guimarães França
- Condomínio Verônica Barbosa
- Desengano
- Dr. Joaquim Guimarães
- Eldorado
- Fábrica
- Fátima (Coreia)
- Fortaleza
- Grotinha
- Imperador
- Jardim Bela Vista
- Jardim Lisboa
- João Paulo II
- Meia Laranja
- Mina de Ouro
- Nova Leopoldina
- Onça
- Palmeiras
- Pedro Brito
- Pedra Pinguda
- Pirineus
- Popular
- Praça da Bandeira
- Quinta Residência
- Redentor
- Roque Schettino (antigo Limoeiro)
- Rosário
- São Cristóvão
- São Luiz
- São Sebastião
- Seminário
- Serra Verde
- Tomé Nogueira
- Três Cruzes
- Vale do Sol
- Vila Esteves
- Vila Miralda
- Zona Industrial

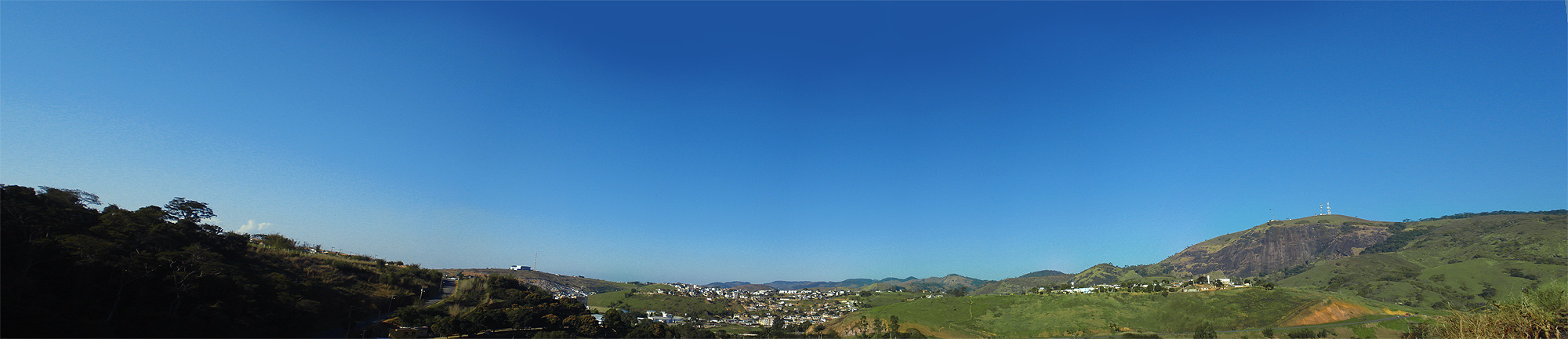
Partial panorama of the municipality of Leopoldina, Minas Gerais, Brazil.

== Economy and infrastructure ==
Gross Domestic Product
Year	Thousand (BRL)
2011	602.572
2010	567.948
2009	514.094
2008	462.060
2007	415.882
2006	388.043
2005	359.829
2004	316.043
2003	267.735
2002	237.022

According to 2011 data from IBGE, Leopoldina had a Gross Domestic Product of R$ 602,572 thousand. Of this total, R$ 52 206 thousand are from taxes on products net of subsidies.

The main economic activities in Leopoldina are services and industry, which account for 65% and 17% of the municipality's GDP, respectively. In the industry, the manufacture of textiles, clothing, food and beverages, metal products, rubber and plastic products and non-metallic minerals stand out. Currently, nature tourism is growing in the municipality.

Agriculture has a share of 8.5% in the GDP, with dairy farming and the raising of chickens and pigs standing out. Leopoldina also produces corn, rice, bananas, sugar cane, among others.

The main press organizations in the city are the newspapers, Leopoldinense Online, O Vigilante Online, Hora H Magazine, Rádio-Jornal AM, Rádio 104 FM, Rádio Luz FM (community).

Leopoldina has 46 health facilities, of which 19 are public. In all, the municipality has 243 hospital beds.

=== Transportation ===
The municipality of Leopoldina is served by federal highways BR-116 (Rio-Bahia), BR-120 and BR-267 and also by state highway MG-454. The Leopoldina Railroad, now granted to Ferrovia Centro-Atlântica (FCA), passes through the districts of Providência, Abaíba and Ribeiro Junqueira. Leopoldina Airport is located in the district of Piacatuba.

In 2012, the municipality's fleet totaled 16,575 vehicles, of which 9,901 were cars, 663 trucks, 262 tractor-trailers, 1,060 pickup trucks, 3,493 motorcycles, 85 buses, 67 minibuses and 1,044 of other types.

=== Education ===
Leopoldina has thirty primary education institutions, of which twenty-four are public; nine secondary education institutions (six public) and four higher education institutions - UEMG (public), CEFET (public), UNIPAC (private) and DOCTUM (private).

==== Higher education institutions ====
- Federal Center for Technological Education (CEFET);
- Doctum Unified Colleges;
- Presidente Antônio Carlos University (UNIPAC);

==== Technical education institutions ====
- Federal Center for Technological Education of Minas Gerais (CEFET-MG);
- Federal Southeast Institute of Minas Gerais (IF Sudeste MG);
- Campanha Nacional de Escolas da Comunidade Institution (CENEC);

== Culture ==
=== Museums ===
The city center is occupied by the Espaço dos Anjos Museum, a 19th-century building where the poet Augusto dos Anjos, patron of the Academia Leopoldinense de Letras e Artes, lived. The district of Piacatuba is the location of the Electricity Museum, next to the Mauricio Power Plant. The city also has libraries, a music conservatory and cultural associations.

=== Religion ===
According to the territorial division of the Catholic Church, Leopoldina has been the seat of a diocese since 1942, whose episcopal see is the Cathedral of St. Sebastian. There are seven parishes in the municipality, four of which are located in the headquarters (Saint Sebastian, Our Lady of the Rosary, Saint Joseph and Saint Benedict), one in Piacatuba (Our Lady of Mercy), one in Tebas (Saint Anthony) and one in Providência (Saint Anthony). The municipality also has temples of other religions, such as evangelical churches. According to information from the 2010 census, conducted by IBGE, most of the population of Leopoldina declares itself Catholic (71.46%), followed by evangelicals (16.62%), spiritists (3.71%), no religion (6.01%) and the rest belonging to other religions. Among the evangelicals, the largest share declared themselves linked to the Assembly of God (4.12%), followed by the Church of the Foursquare Gospel (1.30%) and the Methodist Church (1.14%).

=== Municipal holidays ===
- January 20: Saint Sebastian's Day;
- April 27: Municipality Day;

=== Popular festivals ===
- Feira da Paz: An annual festival with handicraft trade, concerts and cultural events that takes place in September. Several stalls from different countries are set up in the central circle of the Exhibition Park, where typical food and drinks are served;
- Agricultural and Industrial Exhibition: Traditional city event held in July;
- Viola and Gastronomy Festival of Piacatuba: The renowned Viola and Gastronomy Festival takes place in the district of Piacatuba in mid-July/August, with a wide range of visitors and a memorable audience;

== See also ==
- List of municipalities in Minas Gerais
- Brazilian coffee cycle
- Brazilian gold rush
