= Angu River =

Location
- Country: Brazil
- state: Minas Gerais

Physical characteristics
- Source
  - location: Senador Cortes, MG, Brazil
  - coordinates: 21°46′3″S 42°54′34″W
  - elevation: 700 m (2,300 ft)
- Mouth
  - location: Volta Grande, MG, Brazil
  - coordinates: 21°48′24″S 42°30′33″W
- Length: 58 km (36 mi)

The Angu River is a river in the Brazilian state of Minas Gerais. It is a left bank tributary of the Rio Paraiba do Sul. It is 58 km (36 mi) in length and drains an area of 346 km^{2} (134 sq mi) .

The source of the river is located in the municipality of Senador Cortes and it passes through the municipalities of Santo Antônio do Aventureiro and Além Paraíba to its mouth on the Paraiba do Sul near the city of Volta Grande .
