= Leopoldina Railway =

Brazilian railroad

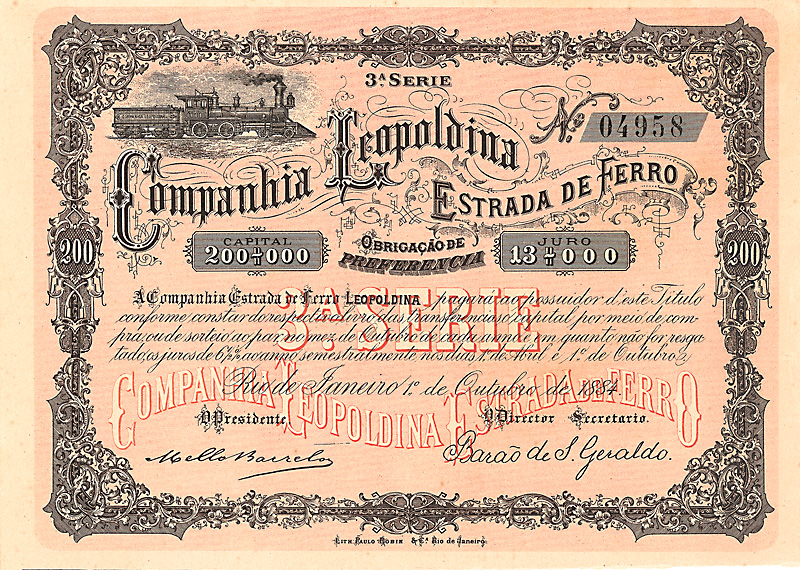
- The company's Bond of Preference, 1884

Overview
- Service type: Inter-city
- Locale: Minas Gerais; Espírito Santo; Rio de Janeiro
- First service: 1874
- Last service: 1965
- Current operator: Ferrovia Centro-Atlântica S.A.

Technical
- Track gauge: 1,000 mm (3 ft 3 3/8 in) metre gauge

The Leopoldina Railway (Portuguese: Estrada de Ferro Leopoldina) was the first railroad established in the current state of Minas Gerais. Located in the southeast of Brazil, it was inaugurated in 1874. it reached over 3,200 kilometers of track, including racks on the stretches of the Serra do Mar.

During its history, the railway experienced serious crises and was controlled by farmers, merchants and British creditors. In 1957, the Rede Ferroviária Federal (RFFSA) assumed responsibility for the lines. However, the measures were ineffective and the railroad progressively lost its branches, being dissolved in 1975. Part of the railroad was transferred to the management of Ferrovia Centro-Atlântica, with a majority of its circuit suppressed and the remainder operating freight transport.

== History ==
=== 1871 - 1889: Beginning ===
In the mid-19th century, coffee, the most important product of the Brazilian economy, was transported by mule to the ports on the coast. In order to improve the distribution of their products, farmers and merchants in the Zona da Mata of Minas Gerais launched an initiative to build a railroad in the area.

On October 10, 1891, Law No. 1826 of the Province of Minas Gerais authorized President Francisco Leite da Costa Belém to grant a subsidy of 9,000$000 réis per kilometer or to guarantee interest of 7% per year on the capital of 2,400:000$000 réis to the company that built a railroad. The line should connect Leopoldina to Porto Novo do Cunha (currently Além Paraíba), on the border between Minas Gerais and Rio de Janeiro, where the tracks of the Dom Pedro II Railway ended.

Imperial Decree No. 4.914 of March 27, 1872 allowed engineer Antônio Paulo de Mello Barreto to organize a company to build the railroad. On June 5, 1892, the Companhia Estrada de Ferro Leopoldina was authorized to operate in Brazil under Decree No. 4,976. The studies for a 38-kilometer stretch began with engineer João Gomes do Val on October 10 and were approved in February of the following year; in March the railroad started to be built. Along with the expansion of coffee production, government subsidies were one of the factors that stimulated the investment.

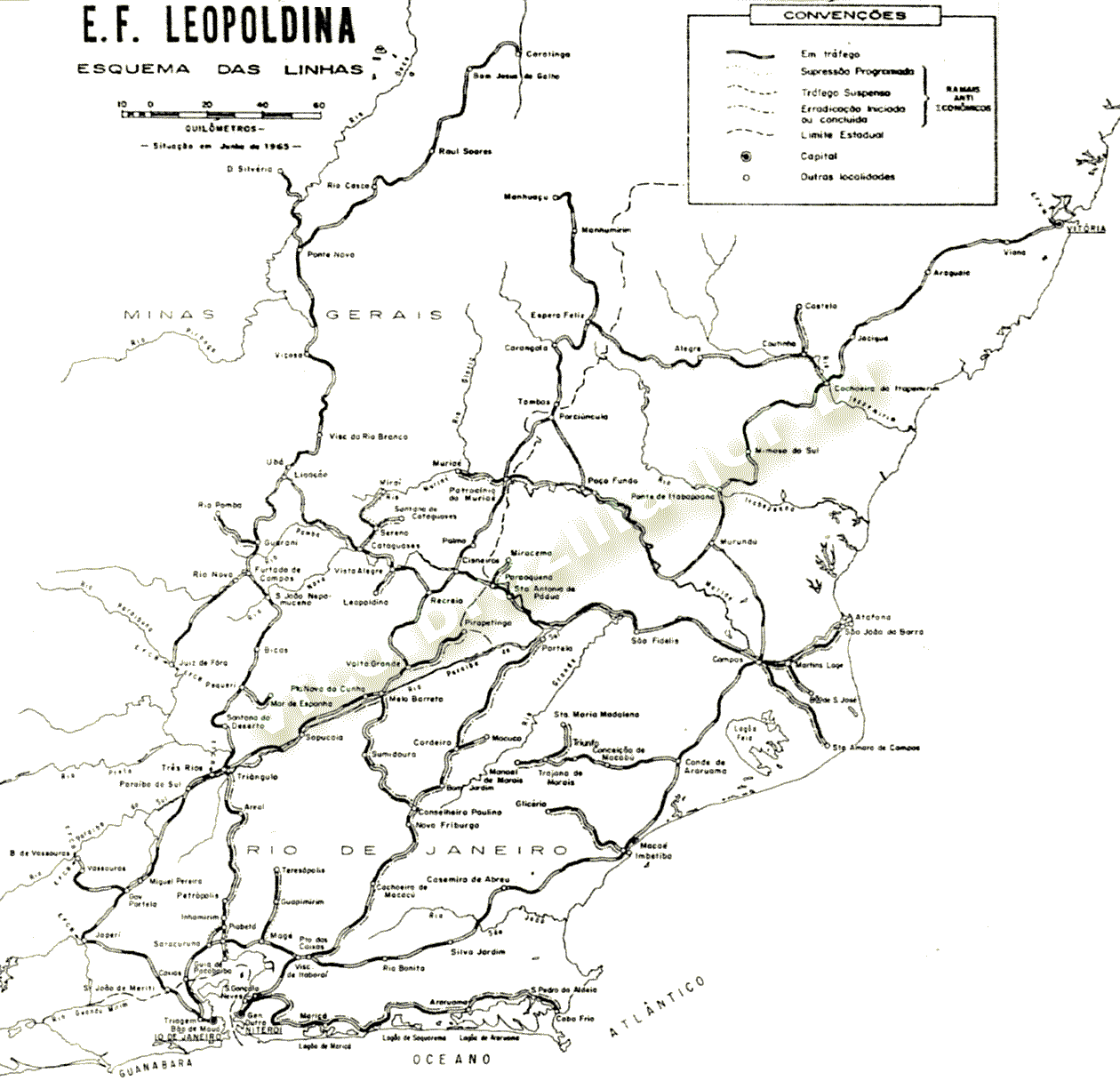
Map of Leopoldina Railway in 1965.

The first stretch was inaugurated on October 8, 1874, in the presence of Pedro II and civil and ecclesiastical authorities and had three stations: São José (São José d'Além Parahyba), at kilometer 3, Pântano (now Antônio Carlos), at kilometer 12, and Volta Grande, at kilometer 27. Later, the São Luiz and Providência stations were inaugurated. It featured five locomotives (two Rogers, two Baldwin and one Belgian, named Visconde de Abaeté, Conselheiro Theodoro, Godoy, Cataguazes and Pomba, respectively), eight passenger cars and 48 freight wagons.

Due to technical issues, the railroad suffered a detour in 1876, reaching Santa Rita do Meia Pataca (now Cataguases) on July 2, 1877, instead of passing through Leopoldina. The change caused dissatisfaction among the residents of Leopoldina, who fought for the creation of a branch line to connect the city to Vista Alegre. Cataguases Station opened on July 2, 1877, and Leopoldina Station opened on July 31, 1877. Over the years, the railroad expanded and acquired smaller companies (the Sumidouro and Pirapetinga branches and the Cantagalo Railway) in order to eliminate competition and establish its hegemony.

=== 1890 - 1897: Expansion and crisis ===
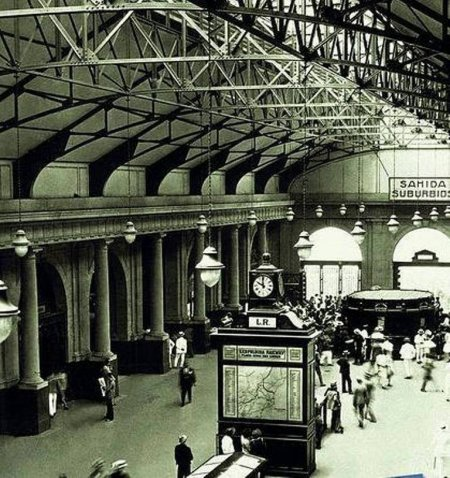
Internal courtyard of the Leopoldina Barão de Mauá Station during its inauguration, 1926

Despite its growth, the Companhia Estrada de Ferro Leopoldina began to face large deficits as the company's managers kept creating new projects without any financial backing to support them. In 1890, the debt was 86,623:277$776 réis. With a promise to settle all the company's liabilities, the Companhia Geral de Estradas de Ferro was created and began acquiring shares and initiating several investments. By 1891, Leopoldina's network already covered 2,127 kilometers in the states of Minas Gerais, Espírito Santo and Rio de Janeiro. However, the Companhia Geral declared bankruptcy in 1892.

In the same year, the Empresa Industrial de Melhoramentos no Brasil assumed office under the promise of fixing the railroad's problems. At the time, Leopoldina's rail circuit was very disconnected, with many junctions and branches in bad condition. In addition, there was a lack of rolling stock to serve the entire length efficiently. The company unified 468 kilometers of railroad and acquired new rolling stock, which increased the financial problems. In 1893, the Naval Revolt began, which suspended traffic on certain stretches of the railroad, resulting in more costs to maintain the lines during the conflict. At the end of 1894, Além Paraíba suffered a cholera epidemic, which had already spread throughout the Paraíba Valley. In order to prevent contagion, the population removed many kilometers of track in the region, increasing the company's losses and difficulties. After these incidents, the Companhia Estrada de Ferro Leopoldina became unable to maintain its regular activities, suffering pressure from British creditors who threatened to hijack sections of the railway network as a means of payment.

At the end of 1895, the Companhia Estrada de Ferro Leopoldina's board of directors submitted their issue to the government, which suggested reorganizing the firm through external loans and standardizing external and internal debts by converting outstanding bonds into their current value and receiving the appropriate bonuses. On June 8, 1896, a meeting was held to sign a commitment to conduct studies for the implementation of the new policy, as well as to determine the responsibilities of the federal and state governments in case of intervention in the transaction. The negotiation only proceeded on March 29, 1897, when the representatives of the English creditors arrived. They argued that the agreement was not advantageous, as the company had already acquired a reputation for defaulting on its debts. In their opinion, it was more appropriate to create an English limited company that would liquidate the firm and take over its assets.

=== 1898 - present: The Leopoldina Railway Company Limited, RFFSA, FCA and VLI ===
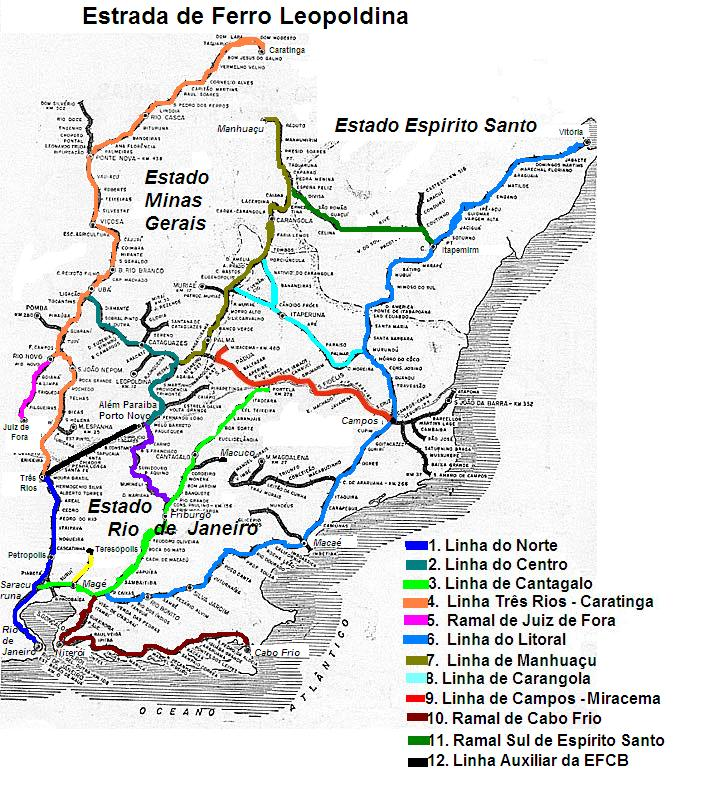
Railway Lines of Companhia Estrada de Ferro Leopoldina in Brazil.

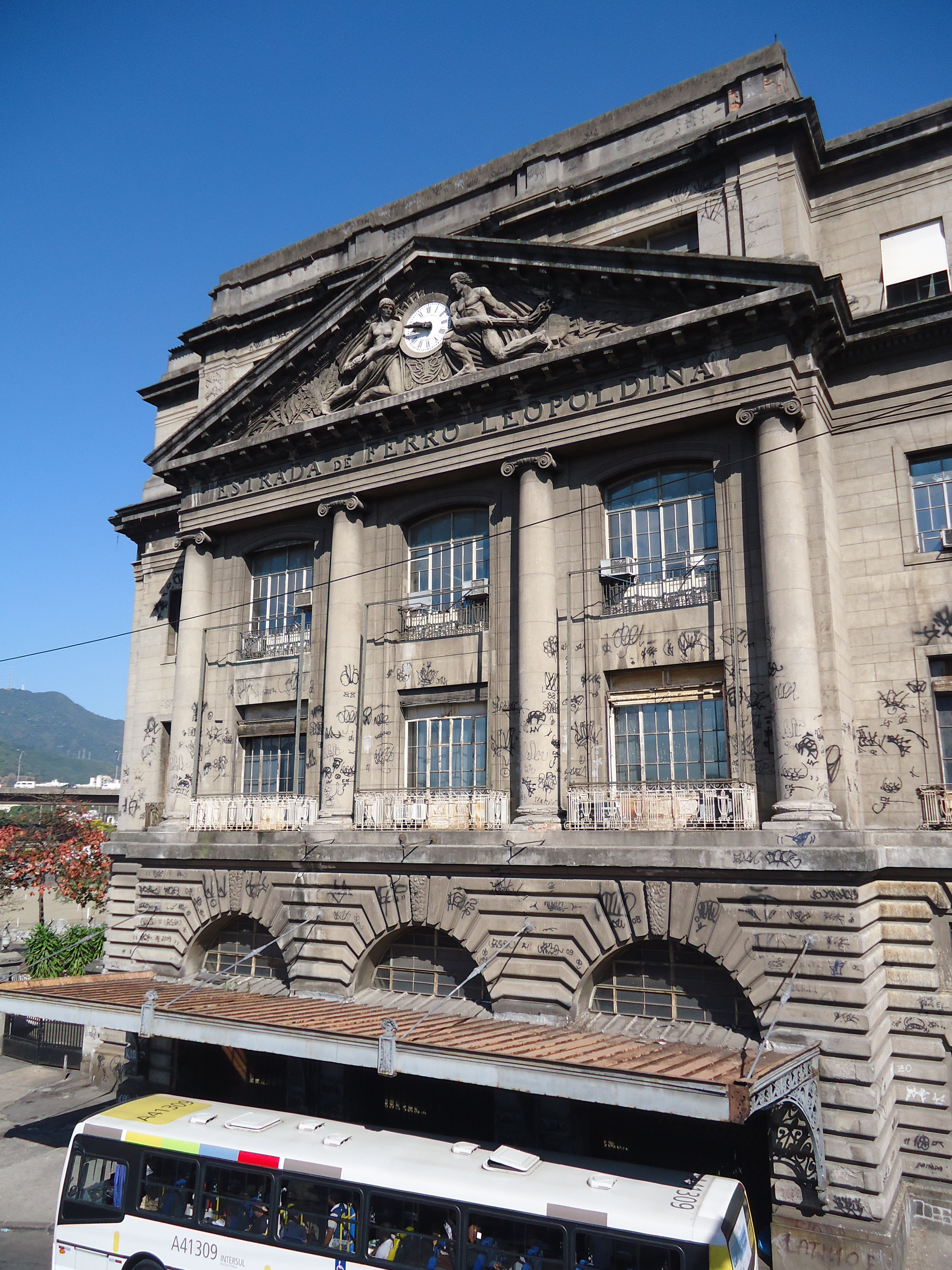
Detail of the facade of Barão de Mauá Station.

On April 3, 1897, the proposal was approved and, on December 16, 1897, The Leopoldina Railway Company Limited, authorized to operate in Brazil by Decree No. 2797 of January 14, 1898, was created in London. The new administration restructured and modernized the system by building new lines and acquiring 38 small railroads in the center and north of the state of Rio de Janeiro, the southeast of Minas Gerais and the south of Espírito Santo. It covered more than 3,200 kilometers of track, including racks on the stretches of the Serra do Mar.

One of the new firm's main plans was to extend the line from São Francisco Xavier to the port and the center of Rio de Janeiro, which required the construction of a station to meet the new demand. The building, which would also house the British embassy, was designed by Robert Prentice, a Scottish architect. On November 15, 1924, construction began, and on December 6, 1926, the Barão de Mauá Station was inaugurated in the presence of Artur Bernardes and the Minister of Transport and Public Works Francisco Sá. The name is a tribute to the pioneer of national rail transport and patron of Brazilian railroads. The station had a 130-meter main facade and four floors.

In 1931, The Leopoldina Railway's lines totaled 3,086 kilometers. The 598 kilometers stretch between Barão de Mauá and Vitória that crosses the Baixada Fluminense to the city of Campos dos Goytacazes, on the north side of the Paraíba do Sul River, and continues to Vitória via Cachoeiro de Itapemirim, stands out. The trunk lines of Saracuruna and Capitinga (595 kilometers) and between Porto das Caixas and Manhuaçu (500 kilometers) also stood out. The Leopoldina Railway faced difficulties with the decline of coffee plantations in the area covered by its lines, which was aggravated by the restrictions imposed during World War II. Despite the subsidies, privileges and benefits, the company failed to recover and was incorporated by the Brazilian government on December 20, 1950, by Law No. 1,288.

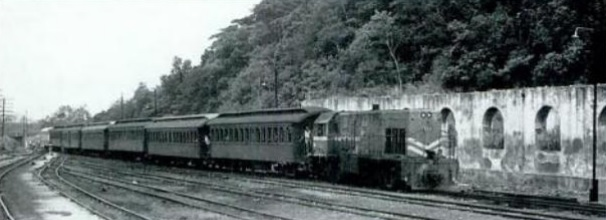
RFFSA diesel locomotive U8B number 2114 on the outskirts of Vila Inhomirim, Rio de Janeiro.

In 1957, the railway was incorporated by the Rede Ferroviária Federal (RFFSA). Part of the structure was revitalized with the acquisition of new diesel-electric and self-propelled locomotives, carbon steel passenger cars and wagons, and the track was renovated. After 1965 there was a progressive decline with the suppression of several "uneconomical" branches, including the rack-and-pinion lines. Allied to financial crises and the government's neglect of its preservation, maintenance and recovery, The Leopoldina Railway was dissolved.

In 1996, during the privatization of RFFSA, the lines were transferred under concession to Ferrovia Centro Atlântica (FCA), which was acquired by Vale and incorporated into VLI Multimodal S.A. Nearly 2,000 kilometers of railway network were deactivated, remaining 1,469 kilometers where the Campos Operating Division (CSP-3) transports oil products (Duque de Caxias - Macaé and Campos dos Goytacazes), steel products (Vitória - Volta Redonda; Minas Gerais - Rio de Janeiro), cement (Minas Gerais - Rio de Janeiro), sugar and alcohol (Campos dos Goytacazes - Rio de Janeiro), limestone (Cachoeiro de Itapemirim - Vitória) and oil exploration equipment on the Campos dos Goytacazes offshore platform. Some buildings, such as the Matilde Railway Station, have been listed as heritage sites.

== Lines and branches ==
Name	Start	End
North Line	Rio de Janeiro (RJ)	Três Rios (RJ)
Downtown Line	Porto Novo do Cunha (MG)	Ligação, Ubá (MG)
Cantagalo Line	Saracuna (RJ)	Portela, Itaocara (RJ
Três Rios - Caratinga Line	Três Rios (RJ)	Caratinga (MG)
Juiz de Fora Branch	Furtado de Campos, Rio Novo (MG)	Juiz de Fora (MG)
Litoral Line	Niterói (RJ)	Vitória (ES)
Manhuaçu Line	Recreio (MG)	Manhuaçu (MG)
Carangola Line	Porciúncula (RJ)	Murundu, Campos dos Goytacazes (RJ)
Campos - Miracema line	Campos dos Goytacazes (RJ)	Miracema (RJ)
Cabo Frio Branch	Neves, São Gonçalo (RJ)	Cabo Frio (RJ)
Southern branch of Espírito Santo	Cachoeiro do Itapemirim (ES)	Espera Feliz (MG)

== See also ==
- Vitória-Minas Railway
- Dom Pedro II Railway
- Rail transport in Brazil
