= Laranjal =

Laranjal may refer to the following places in Brazil:

- Laranjal, Minas Gerais
- Laranjal, Paraná
- Praia do Laranjal, Rio Grande do Sul
- Laranjal Paulista, São Paulo
