= BR-267 (Brazil highway) =

BR-267

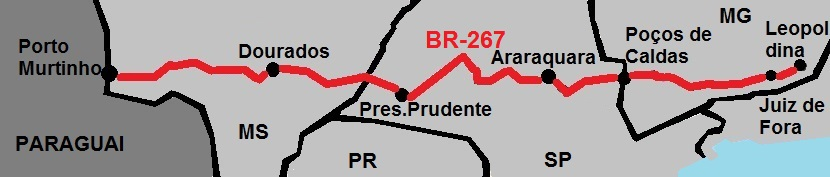

Route information
- Length: 1,921.3 km (1,193.8 mi)

Major junctions
- East end: BR-116 in Leopoldina
- West end: Brazil–Paraguay border in Porto Murtinho

Location
- Country: Brazil

Highway system
- Highways in Brazil; Federal

The BR-267 is a Brazilian federal highway that crosses the Brazilian states of Minas Gerais, São Paulo and Mato Grosso do Sul.

It originates in the municipality of Leopoldina, Minas Gerais, at the junction with Highway BR-116 and continues to the Brazil–Paraguay border in Porto Murtinho, Mato Grosso do Sul.

BR-267 has a total length of 1,922 km (1,194 mi), including 533 km in Minas Gerais, 706 km in São Paulo and 683 km in Mato Grosso do Sul. In Minas Gerais, on the stretch between Juiz de Fora and Poços de Caldas, it is called Rodovia Vital Brazil, with a project to change it to Rodovia Presidente Itamar Franco.

== Gallery ==
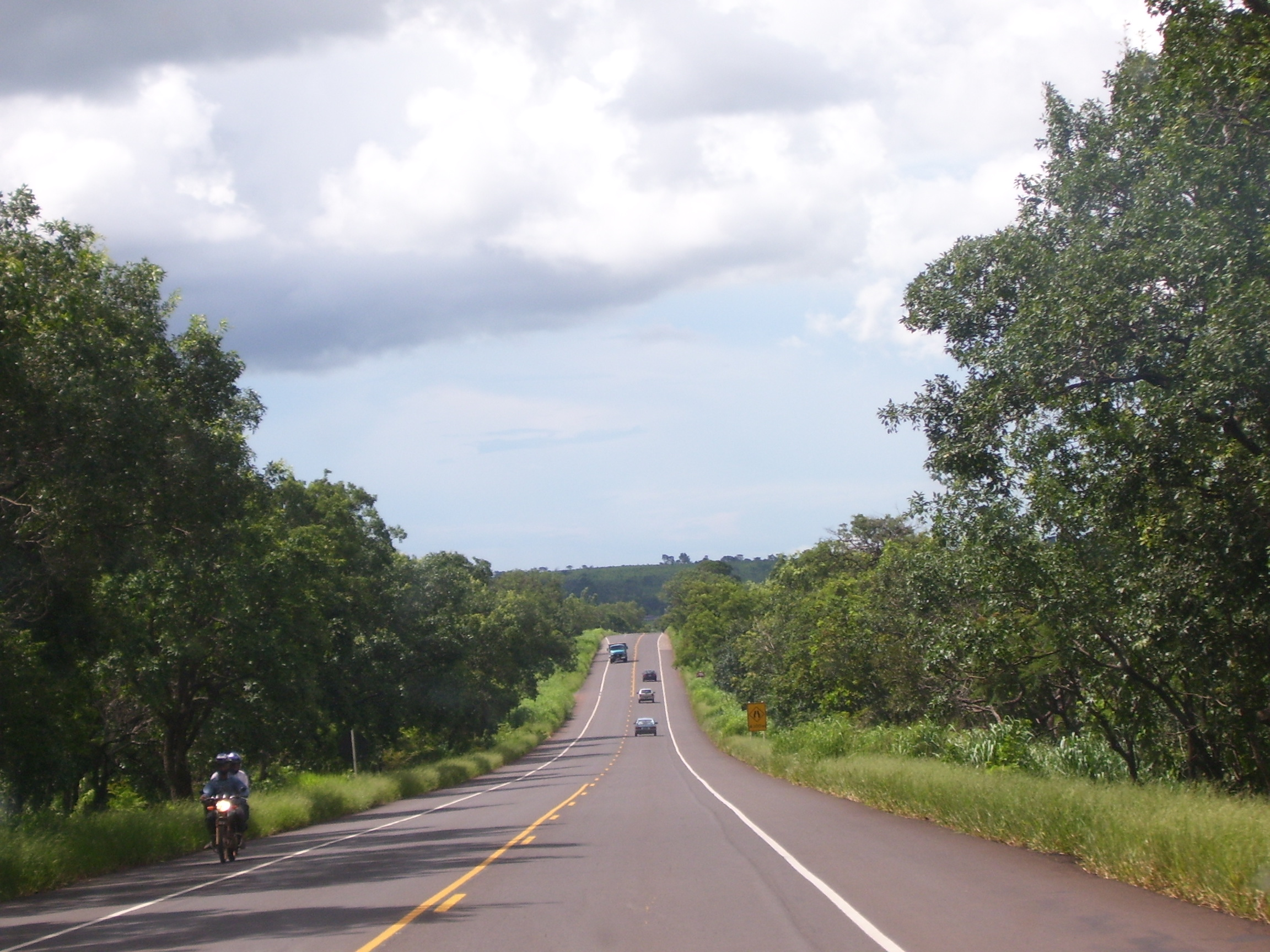
BR-267 between Bataguassu and Campo Grande.

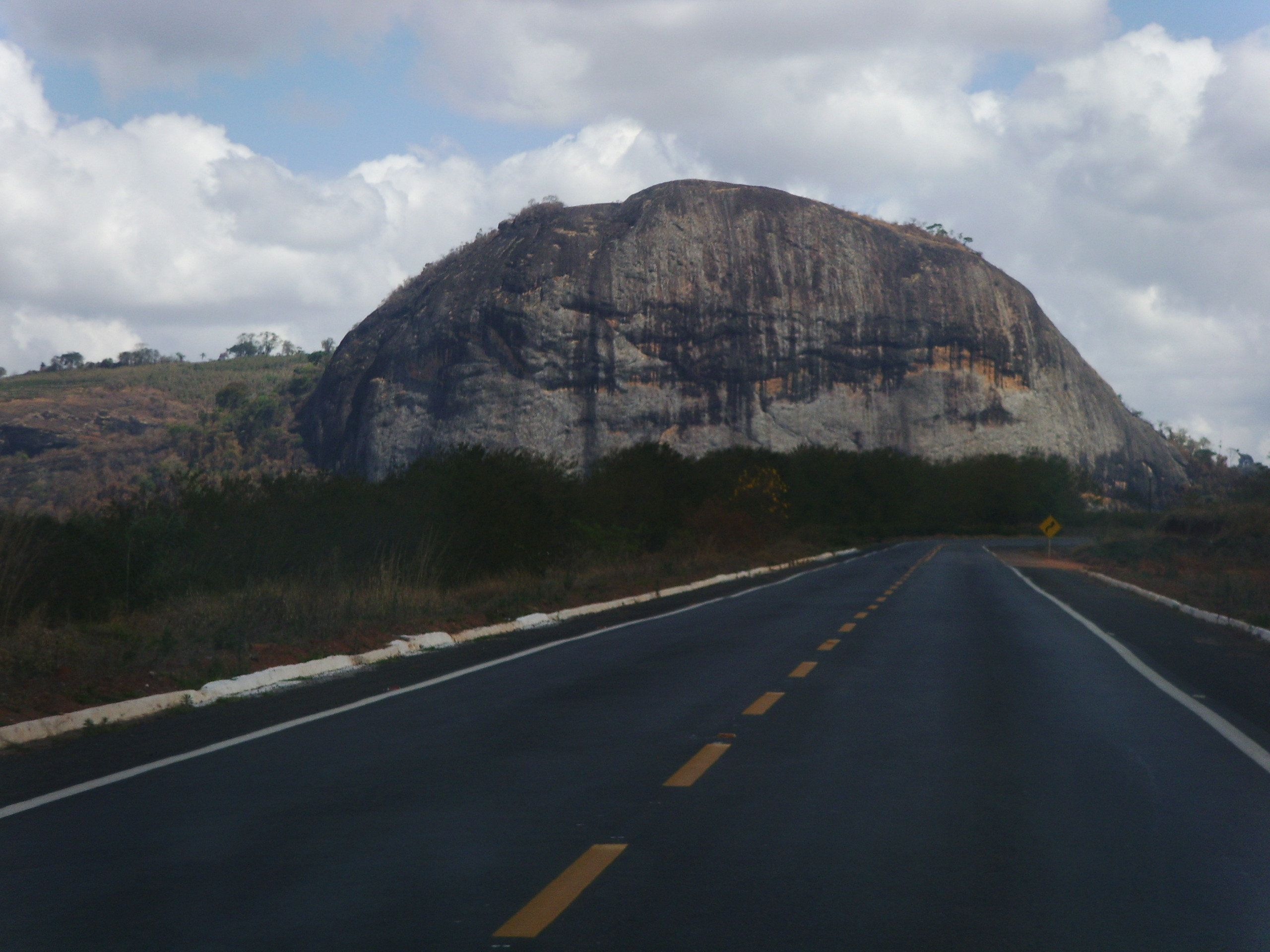
BR-267 in Campestre, Minas Gerais

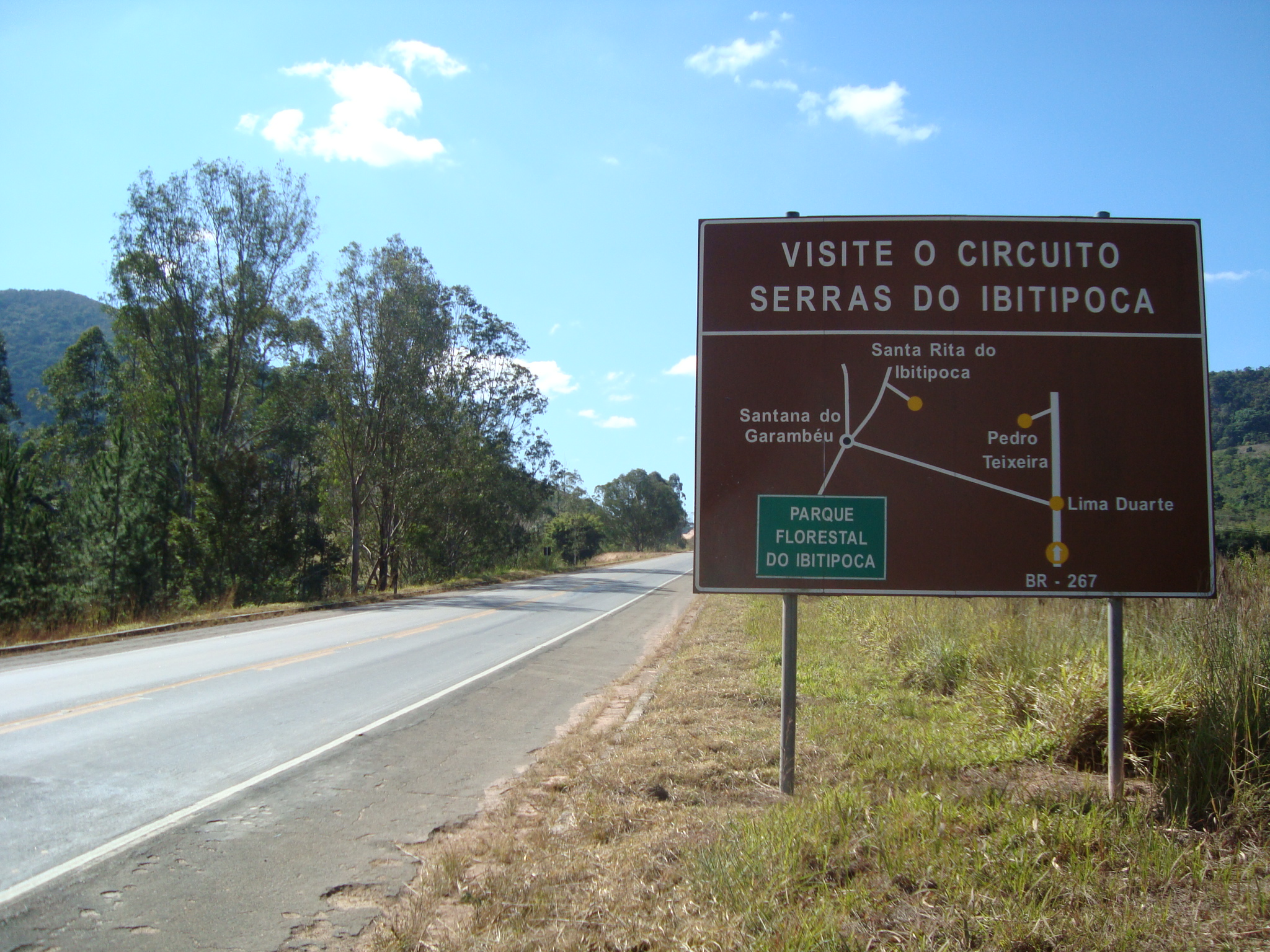
BR-267 in Olaria, Minas Gerais

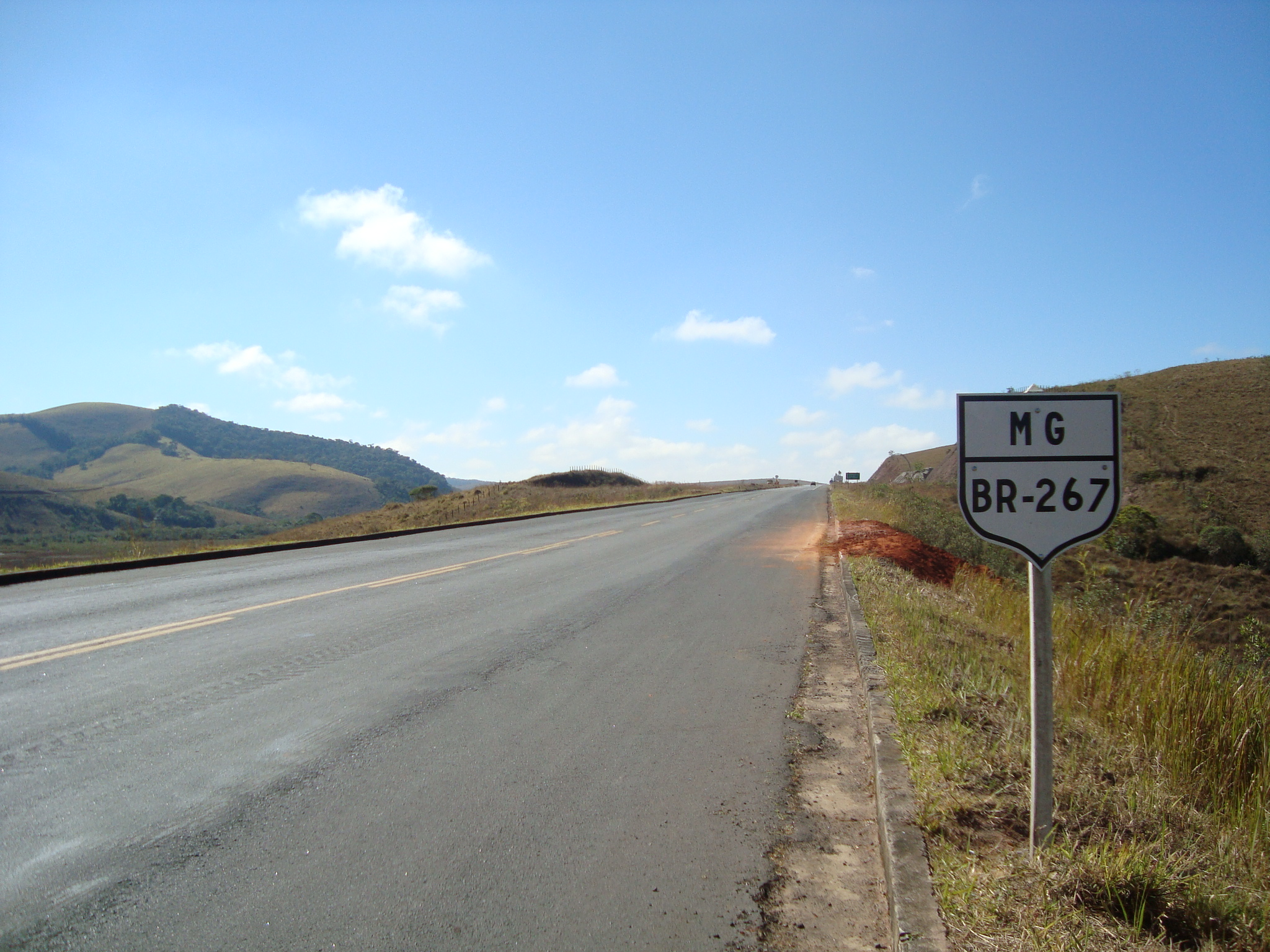
BR-267 in Aiuruoca, Minas Gerais
