= Antônio Géder =

Brazilian footballer (born 1978)

Géder
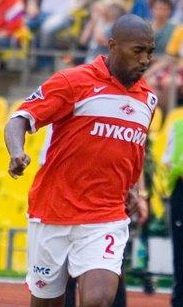
- Géder with Spartak Moscow in May 2007

Personal information
- Full name: Antônio Géder Malta Camilo
- Date of birth: 23 April 1978 (age 48)
- Place of birth: Recreio, Brazil
- Height: 1.83 m (6 ft 0 in)
- Position: Defender

Senior career*
Years	Team	Apps	(Gls)
1998–2002	Vasco da Gama	62	(1)
2003–2006	Saturn Moscow Oblast	85	(3)
2006–2007	Spartak Moscow	22	(1)
2008–2010	Le Mans	58	(0)
2010–2012	Sport Recife	2	(0)
2012	Madureira	0	(0)
Total		229	(5)
- * Club domestic league appearances and goals

Antônio Géder Malta Camilo (born 23 April 1978 in Recreio, Minas Gerais), known as Géder, is a Brazilian former professional footballer who played as a defender.

Géder joined Russian side Saturn Moscow Oblast in 2003 after spending five seasons with Vasco da Gama. He joined Spartak Moscow in August 2006, and in January 2008 he moved to French Ligue 1 club Le Mans. After two seasons, exactly on the 23 July 2010, he rescinded his contract with the club by mutual consent and joined Sport Recife in Brazil.

He was originally a right-back in Brazil but converted to centre-back when he arrived in Russia.
