= Augusto dos Anjos =

Brazilian poet and teacher

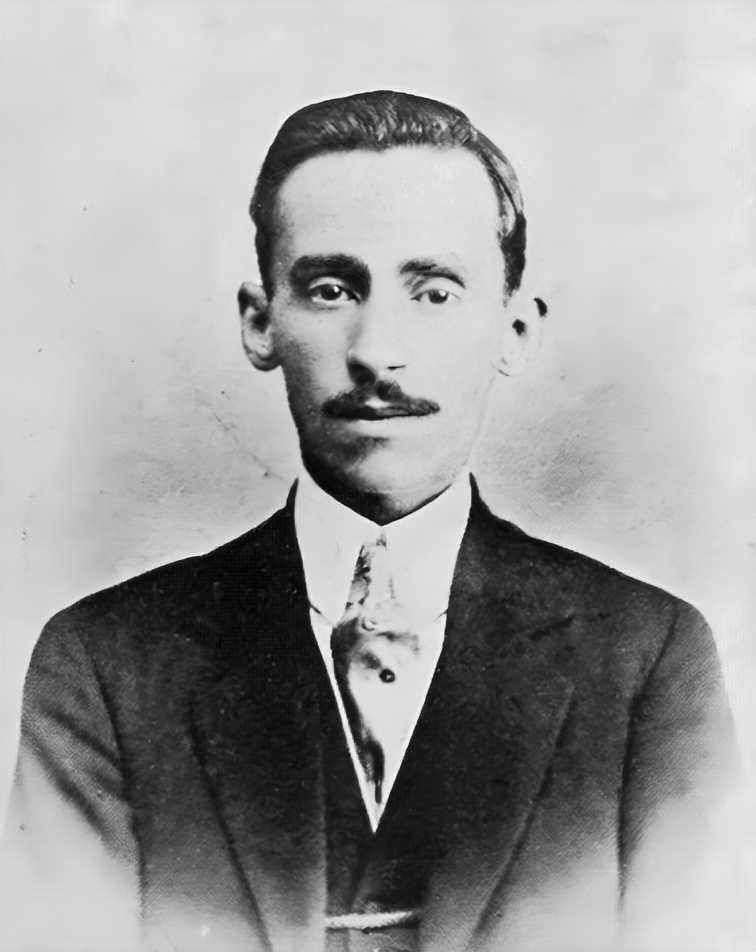
- Portrait of Augusto dos Anjos published with his 1912 book, Eu
- Born: Augusto de Carvalho Rodrigues dos Anjos; April 20, 1884; Cruz do Espírito Santo, Paraíba, Brazil
- Died: November 12, 1914 (aged 30); Leopoldina, Minas Gerais, Brazil
- Education: Federal University of Pernambuco Recife School of Law
- Occupations: Poet, professor
- Spouse: Ester Fialho (m. 1910)
- Writing career
- Notable work: Eu e Outras Poesias
- Literary movement: Parnassianism, Symbolism, Pre-Modernism

Augusto de Carvalho Rodrigues dos Anjos (April 20, 1884 – November 12, 1914) was a Brazilian poet and professor. His poems speak mostly of sickness and death, and are considered the forerunners of Modernism in Brazil.

He is the patron of the first chair of the Paraiban Academy of Letters.

== Biography ==
Augusto dos Anjos was born in 1884, in an engenho named Pau d'Arco, at the city of Cruz do Espírito Santo, in the Brazilian state of Paraíba (nowadays, the engenho is located in Sapé, also in Paraíba). He was initially homeschooled by his father, until he was admitted at the Lyceu Paraibano, where he would become a teacher in 1908. Augusto wrote poems since he was 7 years old.

In 1903 he was admitted at Law course at the Faculdade de Direito do Recife, graduating in 1907. In 1910 he married Ester Fialho.

Starting a career as a magistrate, he moved to Rio de Janeiro, where he served as teacher for many educational institutions and started to publish his poems in periodicals and newspapers. In 1912 he published his first and only poetry book, Eu (in English: Me), that received mixed reviews by the time it was published. Órris Soares, lifelong friend of Augusto dos Anjos, would republish Eu in 1919, adding then-unpublished poems to it and re-releasing it under the title Eu e Outras Poesias, and since then the book has received better reviews.

As he was serving as a headmaster at a school in the city of Leopoldina, Minas Gerais, when he died on November 12, 1914, victim of pneumonia.

== Work ==
Augusto dos Anjos published only one book during his lifetime, named Eu. The themes of its poems, that are impregnated with a heavily scatological medical, scientific and philosophical vocabulary, are mostly sickness, death, heavy morbidity and pessimism.

Literary critics are not sure to which literary movement Augusto dos Anjos belong: some say he was a Symbolist and some say he was a Parnassian, although Ferreira Gullar classifies him as being a Pre-Modernist.

== Trivia ==
- A recurring character in most of his poems is a tamarind tree, that exists to this day at the remains of the engenho Pau d'Arco.
- According to Órris Soares, Augusto dos Anjos used to make his poems in his head, walking around, gesticulating and saying its verses out loud, before putting them into paper.
- Eudes Barros told that, while living with his sister in Rio de Janeiro, he used to make up poems by sitting in his house's yard and screaming the verses, a habit that made his sister think he was mentally ill.
- It is believed that he had asthma.
