= High-speed rail in Brazil =

TAV Brasil

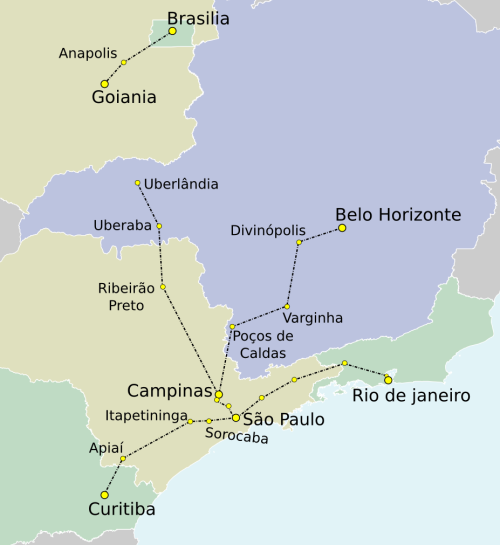
- TAV Brasil map. Stretch Rio/São Paulo/Campinas

Overview
- Service type: Inter-city tilting train
- Status: Planned
- Locale: Southeastern Brazil
- Current operator: TAV Brasil
- Ridership: 33 million (estimate)

Route
- Termini: Campinas; Rio de Janeiro
- Stops: 10
- Distance travelled: 510.8 km (317.4 mi)
- Average journey time: 2 hours and 33 minutes
- Train number: 42 (2014) – 84 (2024)

On-board services
- Classes: Business and first class
- Disabled access: Fully accessible
- Seating arrangements: Airline-style coach seating
- Catering facilities: On-board café, and at-seat meals in first class
- Baggage facilities: Checked baggage available at selected stations

Technical
- Track gauge: 1,435 mm (4 ft 8 1/2 in) standard gauge
- Operating speed: 350 km/h (220 mph) maximum 300 km/h (190 mph) average

The TAV (Portuguese: Trem de Alta Velocidade, meaning high-speed train) is Brazil's first planned high-speed rail service. The first line is proposed to run between Rio de Janeiro and São Paulo. It will travel 403 kilometres (250 mi) between Barão de Mauá Station and Campo de Marte Airport. The journey will take 85 minutes, reaching a maximum speed of 350 km/h (220 mph).

The entire TAV project was originally budgeted at $231 billion, supported by private and international investors rather than the federal government. There have been several attempts to finance and launch the project, but construction has not started.

== Project history ==
A feasibility study projected demand of almost 33 million passengers by 2015. This estimate however is highly criticised for being too generous.

The plans include linking the São Paulo International Airport, in Guarulhos, Greater São Paulo, the Viracopos International Airport, in Campinas, and the Galeão International Airport, in Rio de Janeiro. The route will include 134 km (85 mi) of track passing through 105 tunnels and viaducts. In Guarulhos, São Paulo, there will be a tunnel of 15 km (9.3 mi) in length.

Apart from the Inter-American Development Bank, five other international institutions have already tabled the possibility of investing in the Brazilian super train. BNDES, in particular, has proposed financing the project. An estimated 200,000 jobs are expected to be generated by the project once it gets underway.

The winning bidders will join the government as venture partners through a public company, called ETAV. In July 2000, the CND (National Council for Privatization), following the ruling of the TCU (Court of Audit), authorized the release of the feasibility study for the project.

The consortium that won the bidding for the high-speed train will, according to the original plan, have six years to complete the stretch between Rio and Campinas. According to ANTT (National Agency of Land Transport), however, the winning bidder could complete certain stretches ready for operation beforehand. It was hoped that the complete linkage between Campinas to Rio, via São Paulo, would be complete and in operation for the 2016 Summer Olympics but, due to delays, the project was expected to be completed by 2020. Due to the coronavirus pandemic, the project has been delayed and is now expected to be completed in 2029.

The ETAV, with headquarters in Brasília, aims to plan and promote the development of high-speed rail integrated with other modes of transportation in the country. ETAV's assignments include feasibility studies, technical-economic engineering, research, innovation and technology, absorb and transfer technology, supporting capacity development of national industry, overseeing the execution of the works of infrastructure and the implementation of the operation of transport high-speed railway. The new company will be organized in the form of a privately held corporation and has its capital represented by common shares - of which at least 50% will be owned by a Union.

== Railroad Specification ==
The parameters of the planned railroad are: Gauge: 1,435 mm (4 ft 8 1/2 in); Maximum Projected Speed: 350 km/h; Maximum Gradient (gradient) of the project: 3.5%; Minimum Horizontal Radius: 7228 m; Minimum Vertical Radius: 42.875 m; Axle Load per Train: 17 t; Crossing Loop/Minimum Platform Length at Each Station: 500 m/400 m (for train sets up to 16 cars). The extension and their paths are divided by 90.9 km or 56.4 mi (18%) of Tunnel, 107.8 km or 66.9 mi (21%) of bridges and viaducts, and 312.1 km or 193.9 mi (61%) of the surface.

== TAV by Route ==
=== TAV Campinas/São Paulo/Rio ===
The first planned line will link the Brazilian cities of São Paulo and Rio de Janeiro. There will be seven stations on the route, including the cities of Campinas, Jundiaí, São José dos Campos, and Aparecida in the State of São Paulo and the cities of Resende, Barra Mansa in the State of Rio de Janeiro. The project will include the main airports of Campinas, São Paulo, and Rio.

=== TAV Brasília/Goiânia ===
In 2009, the construction of the TAV High-speed railway between Brasília/Anápolis/Goiânia was announced, known as the Expresso Pequi. In 2017, South Korean rail operator AREX proposed a line with a maximum speed of 250 km/h (160 mph) between the two cities.

=== TAV Ribeirão Preto/Uberlândia ===
There are also plans for a high-speed railway between Uberlândia and Ribeirão Preto, which will be funded by the federal government.

== See also ==
- List of high-speed railway lines
- Trens Intercidades
