= Lapinha Biological Reserve =

- Reserva Biológica Lapinha
- IUCN category Ia (strict nature reserve)
- Location within Brazil
- Nearest city: Leopoldina, Minas Gerais
- Coordinates: 21°29′13″S 42°44′10″W
- Area: 369 hectares (910 acres)
- Designation: biological reserve
- Created: 23 September 1974

Lapinha Biological Reserve (Portuguese: Reserva Biológica Lapinha) is a small State Biological Reserve in the municipality of Leopoldina, Minas Gerais, Brazil.

== History ==
The reserve, which covers 368.7 hectares (911 acres) in the municipality of Leopoldina, Minas Gerais, was created on 23 September 1974.

== Status ==
The climate is tropical, with average temperatures of about 21 °C (70 °F) and average rainfall of 1,307 millimetres (51.5 in). The municipality was once covered in semi-deciduous forest of the Atlantic Forest biome, but has been severely deforested. As of 2009 the State Biological Reserve was a "strict nature reserve" under IUCN protected area category Ia.

== Sources ==
- "Geografia", Jornal Leopoldinense
- Reservas Biologicas – MG (PDF) (in Portuguese), IEF
- Triana, Elisa (29 May 2009), "Strict Nature Reserves in Brazil", The Encyclopedia of Earth
