= Pirapetinga =

Coordinates: 21°39′21″S 42°20′45″W

- Municipality
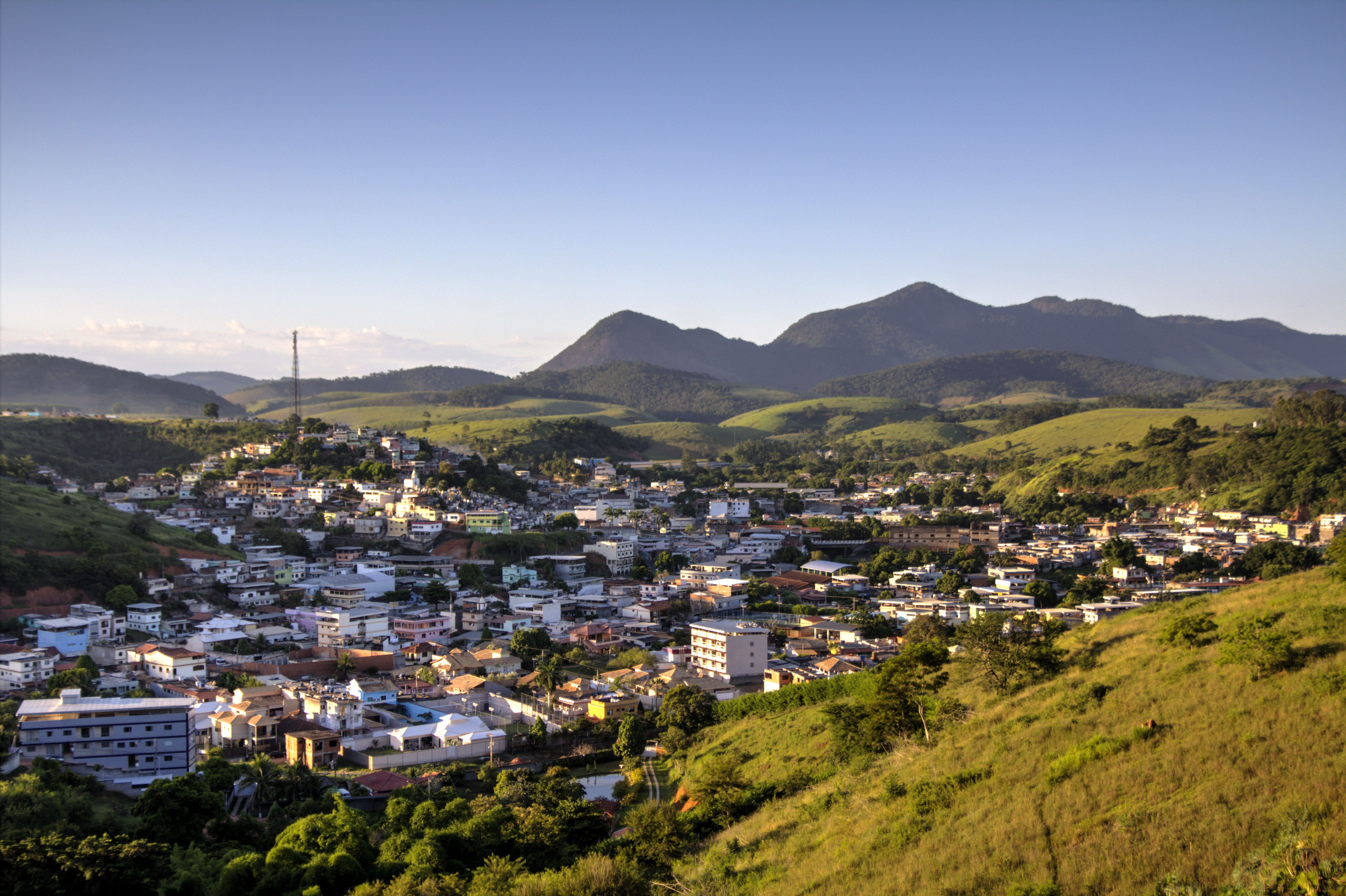
- Skyline

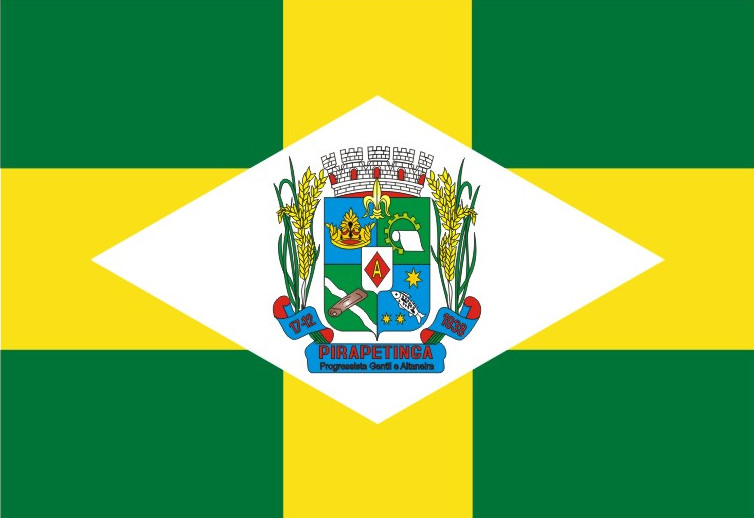
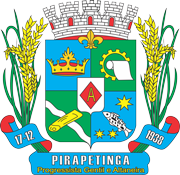
- Flag Coat of arms
- Interactive map of Pirapetinga
- Country: Brazil
- Region: Southeast
- State: Minas Gerais
- Mesoregion: Zona da Mata

Population (2020)
  - Total: 10,772
- Time zone: UTC−3 (BRT)

Pirapetinga is a municipality in the state of Minas Gerais in the Southeast region of Brazil.

Its estimated population in 2020 was 10,772 inhabitants (IBGE).

== Geography ==
The municipality is located in the Meso-region of Zona da Mata near the border with the State of Rio de Janeiro. It is 379 kilometres (235 mi) by road from the capital of Minas Gerais, Belo Horizonte. It has an area of 192 square kilometres (74 mi^{2}) including the city itself and two districts: Valão Quente and Caiapó.

=== Topography, climate, hydrology ===
The city is at an altitude of 160 metres (520 ft), with the highest point being Pedra Bonita at 797 metres (2,615 ft). The climate is tropical with wet summers and an average annual temperature around 23.5 °C (74.3 °F), with variations between 18 °C (64 °F) (mean minimum) and 31 °C (88 °F) (mean maximum).

The district is watered by the River Pirapetinga a tributary of the Paraíba do Sul.

== Highways ==
BR-393

== Demographics ==
=== Census Data - 2000 ===
Total Population: 10,034

Urban: 8413

Rural: 1621

Men: 5034

Women: 5000

(Source: AMM )

Population density (inhabitants / km^{2}): 51.8

Infant mortality (per thousand): 25.4

Life expectancy (years): 71.1

Fertility rate (children per woman): 2.2

Literacy Rate: 83.8%

Human Development Index (HDI): 0.759

HDI-M Income: 0.681

HDI-M Longevity: 0.768

HDI-M Education: 0.827

(Source: UNDP / 2000)

== History ==
The city began as a village that grew up around the chapel erected in honour of Saint Anne in 1850. In 1864, the village became a district of Leopoldina with the name of Santana Pirapetinga.

It became independent of the municipality of Além Paraíba in 1938.

== See also ==
- List of municipalities in Minas Gerais
