= St. Sebastian Cathedral, Leopoldina =

Coordinates: 21.5325°S 42.6431°W

St. Sebastian Cathedral
- Catedral São Sebastião
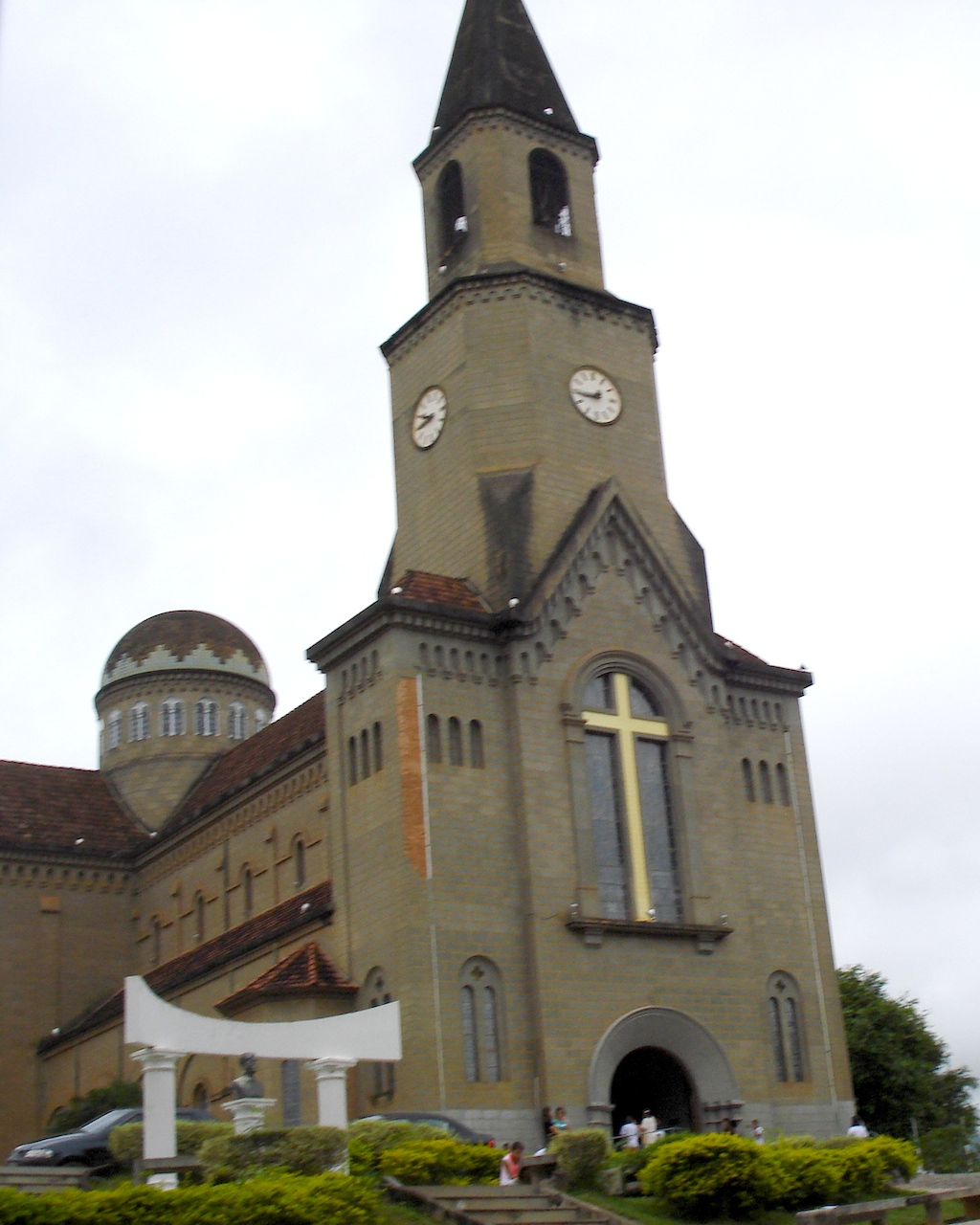
- St. Sebastian Cathedral
- Location: Leopoldina
- Country: Brazil
- Denomination: Roman Catholic Church

Administration
- Province: Juiz de Fora
- Archdiocese: Juiz de Fora
- Diocese: Leopoldina

St. Sebastian Cathedral (Portuguese: Catedral São Sebastião) also known as Leopoldina Cathedral is a parish of the Roman Catholic Church in Leopoldina, Minas Gerais, Brazil, and seat of the Diocese of Leopoldina. It is dedicated to Saint Sebastian.

The cathedral church is located in the Dom Helvecio square of the cathedral district, which houses the parish and three dependent chapels: the Chapel of Our Lady of the Immaculate Conception, Chapel of Our Lady of Mount Carmel, and Chapel of St. Peter.

The parish of St. Sebastian was created 27 April 1854, when the elevation of the district of St. Sebastian created the city of Leopoldina. When it was created, the parish was subordinated to the then-Diocese of Rio de Janeiro. On July 16, 1897, by decision of Pope Leo XIII, it was transferred to the Diocese of Mariana.

On March 28, 1942, with the erection of the Diocese of Leopoldina, the church was elevated to cathedral status, but its construction was completed only around 1965.

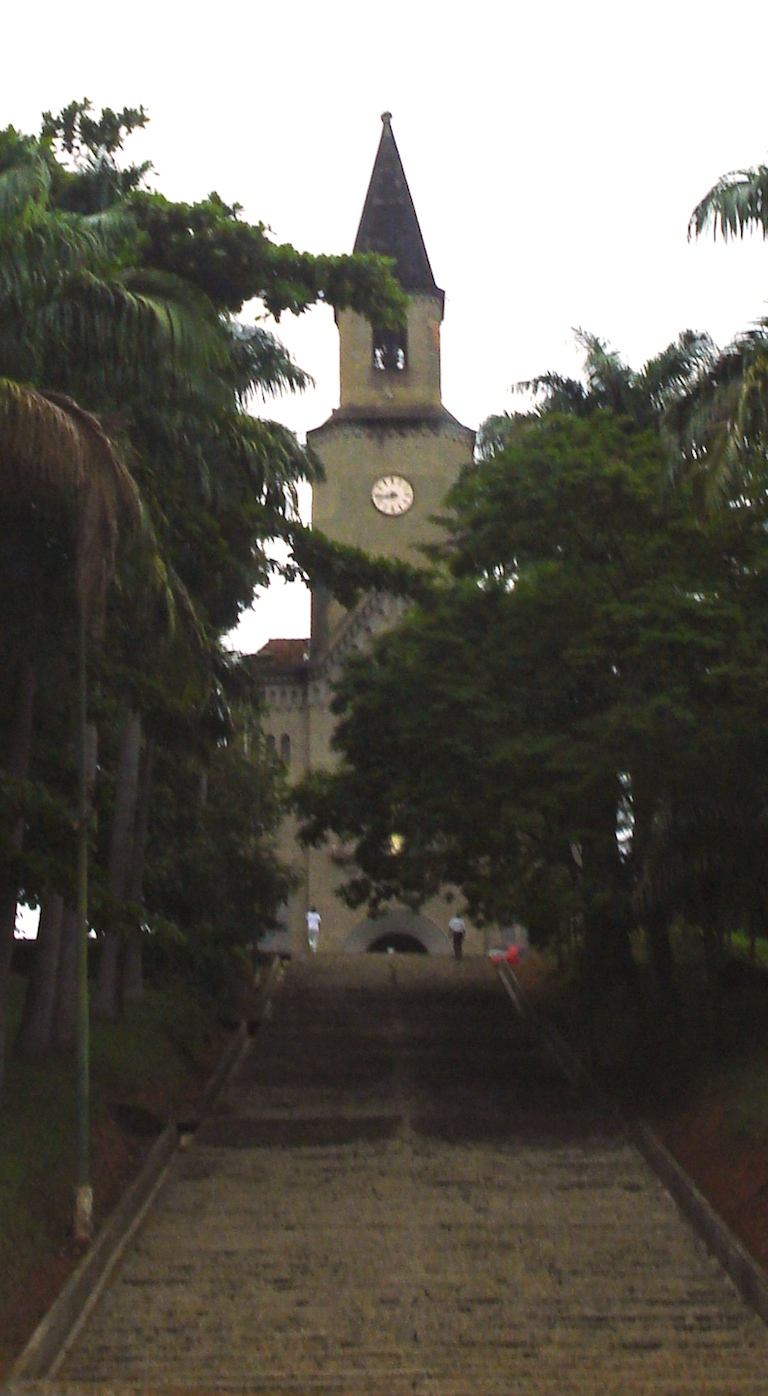
Another View

== See also ==
- Catholic Church in Brazil
