= Barão de Mauá Station =

Train station in Rio de Janeiro, Brazil

Barão de Mauá Station Estação Barão de Mauá / Estação Leopoldina
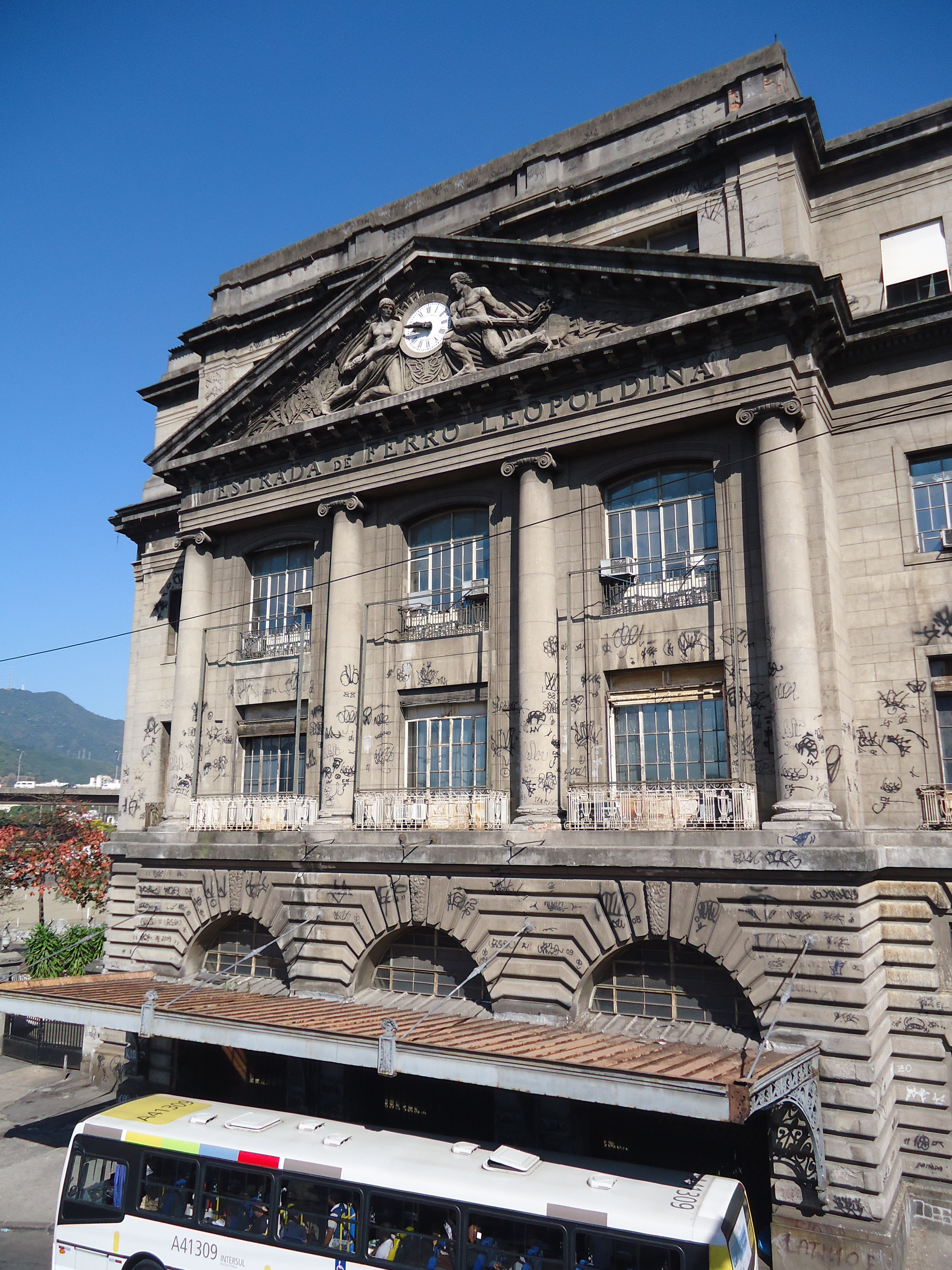
- Façade of the abandoned station in 2012

General information
- Location: Rio de Janeiro, RJ; Brazil
- Coordinates: 22°54′27″S 43°12′42″W

History
- Opened: 6 December 1926
- Closed: February 2001
Location

The Barão de Mauá Station (also known as the Leopoldina Station) is a former train station in Rio de Janeiro, Brazil. The station, named after Irineu Evangelista de Sousa, was constructed in 1926 as the Rio terminus of the Leopoldina Railway. Designed by Scottish architect Robert Prentice, the building is four storeys tall and initially included a British embassy in addition to its railway platforms. The station served as a significant intercity terminus for much of its existence until the late 20th century when long-distance rail travel in Brazil effectively ceased following the privatization of railways. The station was finally closed to rail traffic in 2001 after an accident where an EMU train lost control of its brakes and collided with one of the platform pillars. All rail traffic has been diverted to the Central do Brasil Station which is the terminus for SuperVia commuter rail lines to Rio de Janeiro. Since the station's closing, there had been government proposals to reopen the station for long-distance travel, including as the terminus of a proposed high-speed rail line to São Paulo, however, other decision was taken and in February 2024, President Luiz Inácio Da Silva signed a cooperation agreement with the then-mayor of Rio de Janeiro, Eduardo Paes, under which the federal government transferred management of the station to the municipality for the space's restoration. Paes stated that the building is to be used by federal institutes, while a convention center and "Cidade do Samba 2", designed to house the warehouses for Série Ouro samba schools, are to be built at the rear of the site, alongside a *Minha Casa, Minha Vida* housing project and a Technological Educational Gymnasium. He added that there is no deadline for the completion of these projects. And it was also stated the obsolete vehicles trains and trams to be transferred to Deodoro, this includes 4 built in 1896 and an 1948 Alco FA1, all in very bad conditions, non reparable.
