= Angustura, Minas Gerais =

Angustura
- Location within Brazil
- Coordinates: 21°44′51″S 42°40′36″W
- Country: Brazil
- Region: Southeast
- State: Minas Gerais
- Municipality: Além Paraíba
- Time zone: UTC-3 (UTC-3)
  - Summer (DST): UTC-2 (UTC-2)

Angustura is a district in the municipality of Além Paraíba in the Zona da Mata (Minas Gerais)|Zona da Mata region of Minas Gerais state, Brazil. It lies about 25 km (16 mi) north of Além Paraíba and is the seat of a district of that city of the same name.
