= Laranjal, Paraná =

Coordinates: 24°53′13″S 52°28′08″W

- Municipality
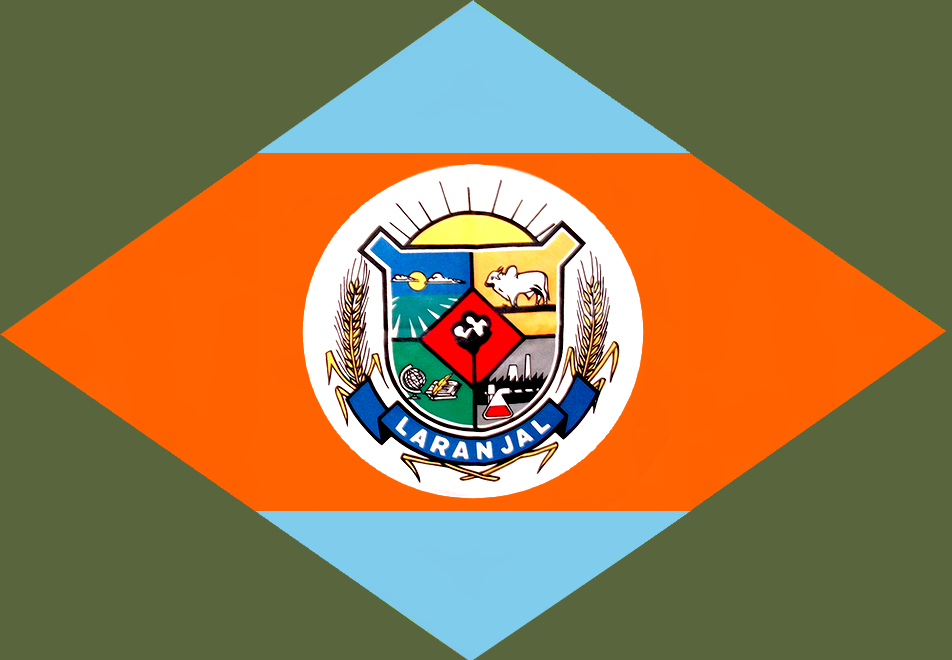
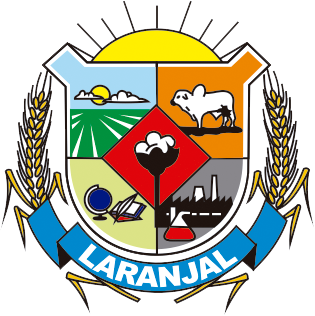
- Flag Coat of arms
- Interactive map of Laranjal, Paraná
- Country: Brazil
- Region: Southern
- State: Paraná
- Mesoregion: Centro-Sul Paranaense

Population (2020)
  - Total: 5,784
- Time zone: UTC−3 (BRT)

Laranjal, Paraná is a municipality in the state of Paraná in the Southern Region of Brazil.

== See also ==
- List of municipalities in Paraná
