= Olaria, Minas Gerais =

Town and municipality in the state of Minas Gerais, Brazil

Coordinates: 21°51′39″S 43°56′13″W

- Municipality
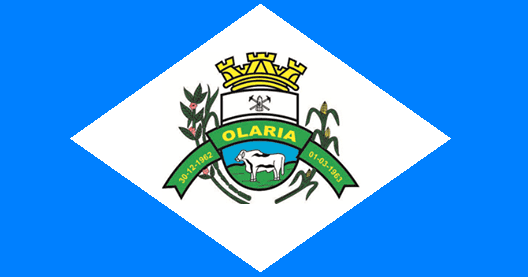
- Flag
- Interactive map of Olaria, Minas Gerais
- Country: Brazil
- State: Minas Gerais
- Region: Southeast
- Time zone: UTC−3 (BRT)

Location of Olaria

Olaria is a municipality in the state of Minas Gerais in the Southeast region of Brazil. As of 2020, the estimated population was 1,720.

== See also ==
- List of municipalities in Minas Gerais
