= Campestre, Minas Gerais =

Town and municipality in the state of Minas Gerais, Brazil

Coordinates: 21°42′39″S 46°14′45″W

- Municipality
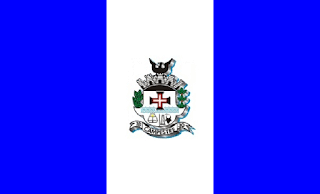
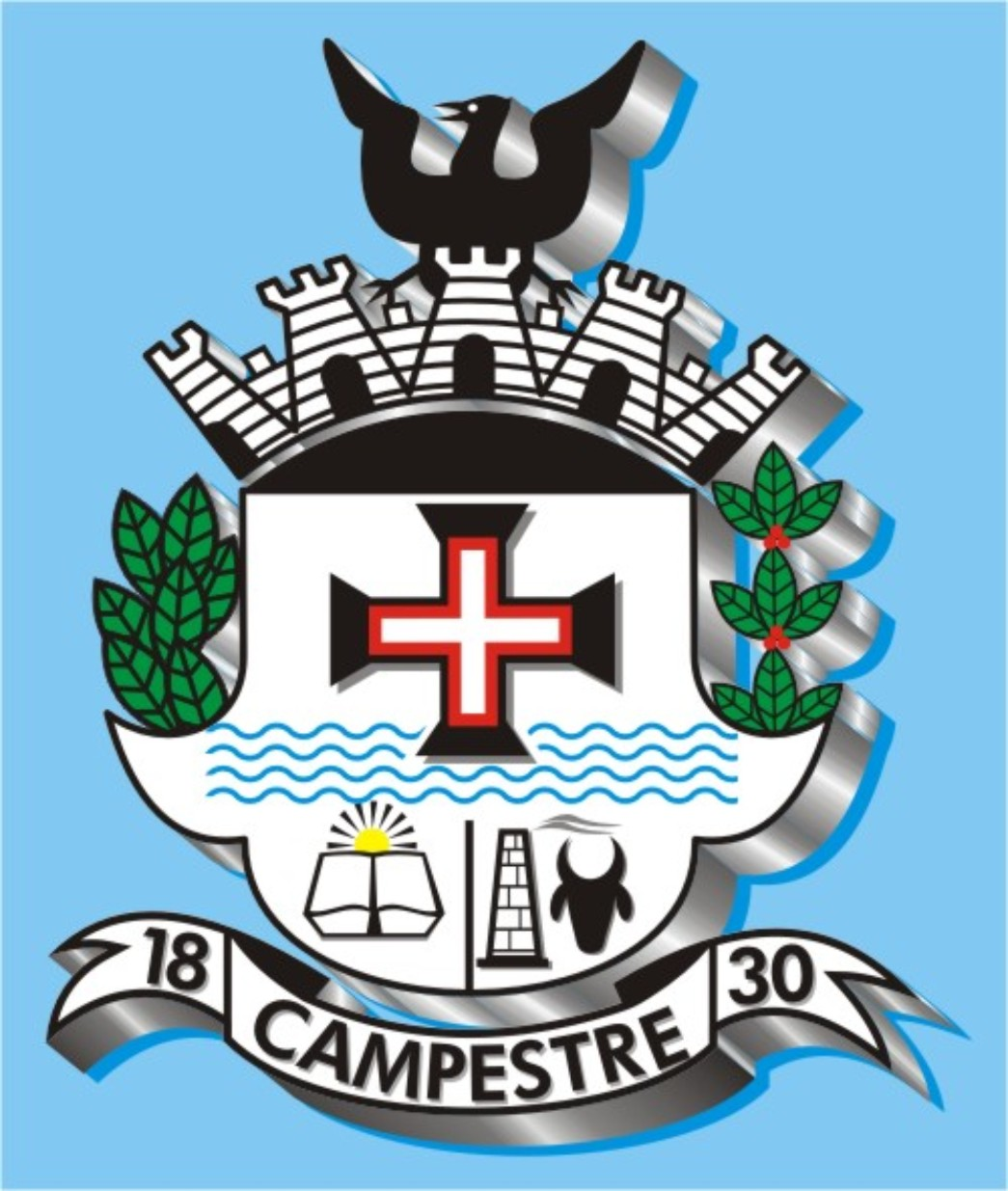
- Flag Coat of arms
- Interactive map of Campestre, Minas Gerais
- Country: Brazil
- State: Minas Gerais
- Region: Southeast
- Time zone: UTC−3 (BRT)

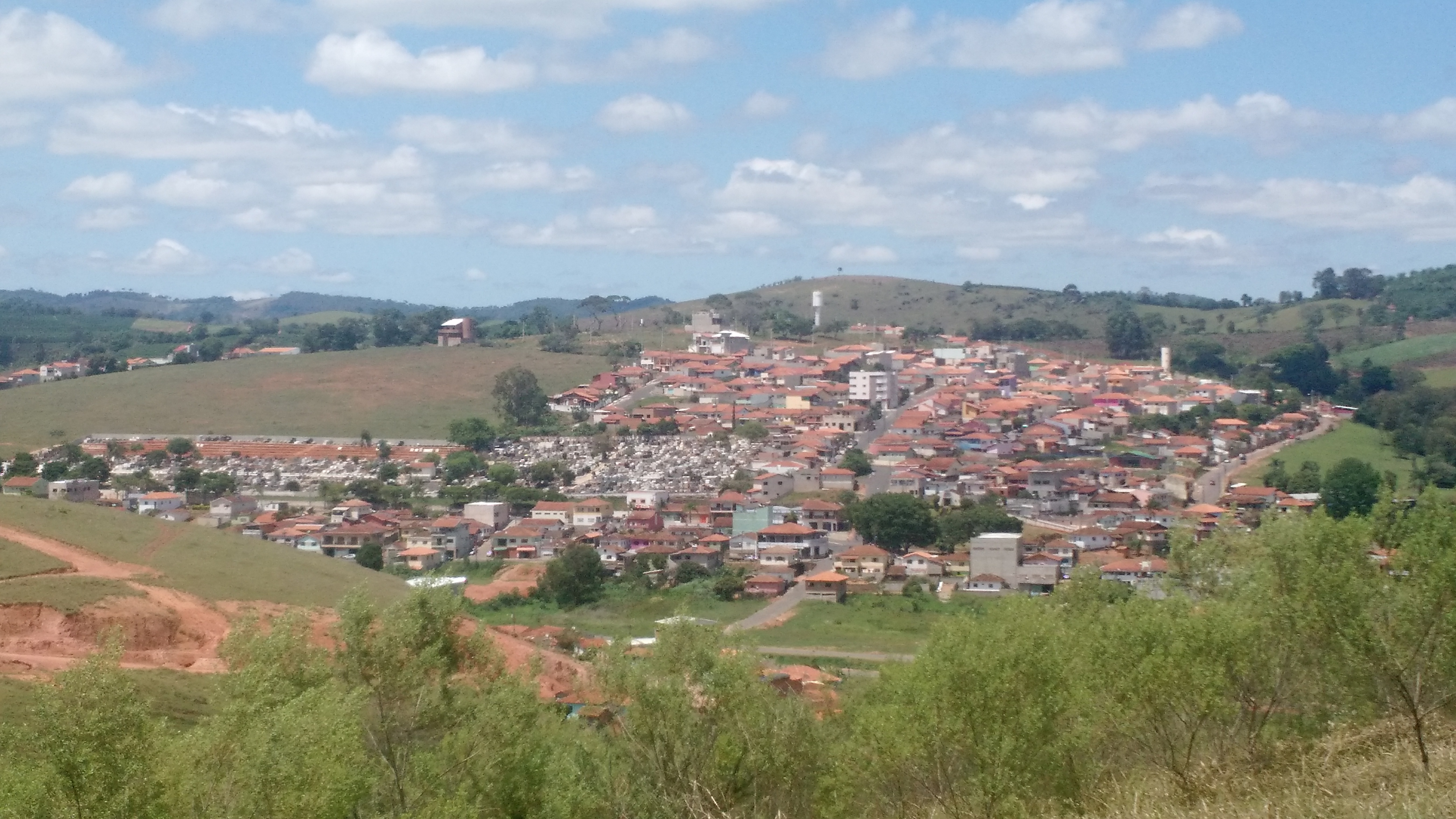
Panoramic view of Campestre

Campestre is a Brazilian municipality located in the south of the state of Minas Gerais. Its population is 21,054 (2020) and its area is 54 km^{2} (21 sq mi).

== See also ==
- List of municipalities in Minas Gerais
