= Senador Cortes =

Coordinates: 21°48′S 42°56′W

- Municipality
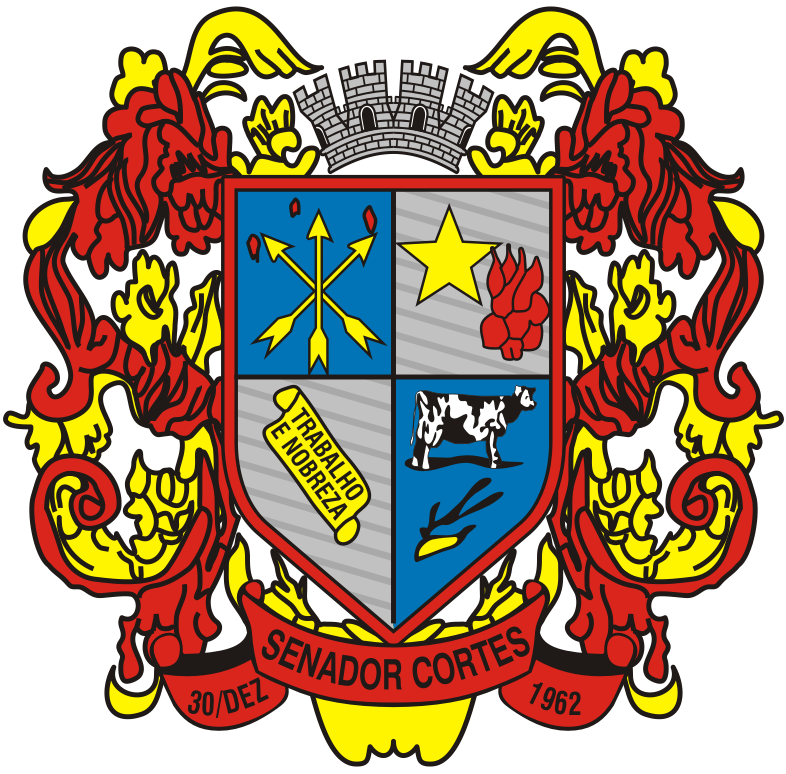
- Coat of arms
- Interactive map of Senador Cortes
- Country: Brazil
- Region: Southeast
- State: Minas Gerais
- Mesoregion: Vale do Rio Doce

Population (2020)
  - Total: 2,003
- Time zone: UTC−3 (BRT)

Senador Cortes is a municipality in the state of Minas Gerais in the Southeast region of Brazil.

The city is named after the Senator of the Brazilian Empire, Agostinho Cezario de Figueiredo Cortes, member of very traditional families of Minas Gerais State.

== See also ==
- List of municipalities in Minas Gerais
