= Itamarati de Minas =

Coordinates: 21.4158°S 42.8178°W

- Municipality
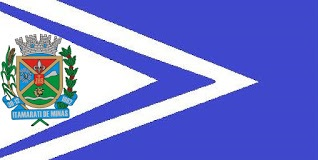
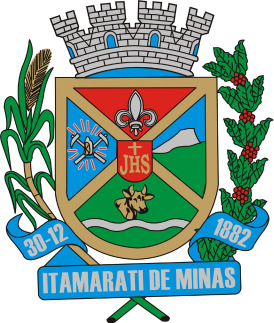
- Flag Coat of arms
- Interactive map of Itamarati de Minas
- Country: Brazil
- Region: Southeast
- State: Minas Gerais
- Mesoregion: Zona da Mata

Population (2020)
  - Total: 4,375
- Time zone: UTC−3 (BRT)

Itamarati de Minas is a municipality in the state of Minas Gerais in the Southeast region of Brazil.

== See also ==
- List of municipalities in Minas Gerais
