= Laranjal, Minas Gerais =

Coordinates: 21.3739°S 42.4769°W

- Municipality
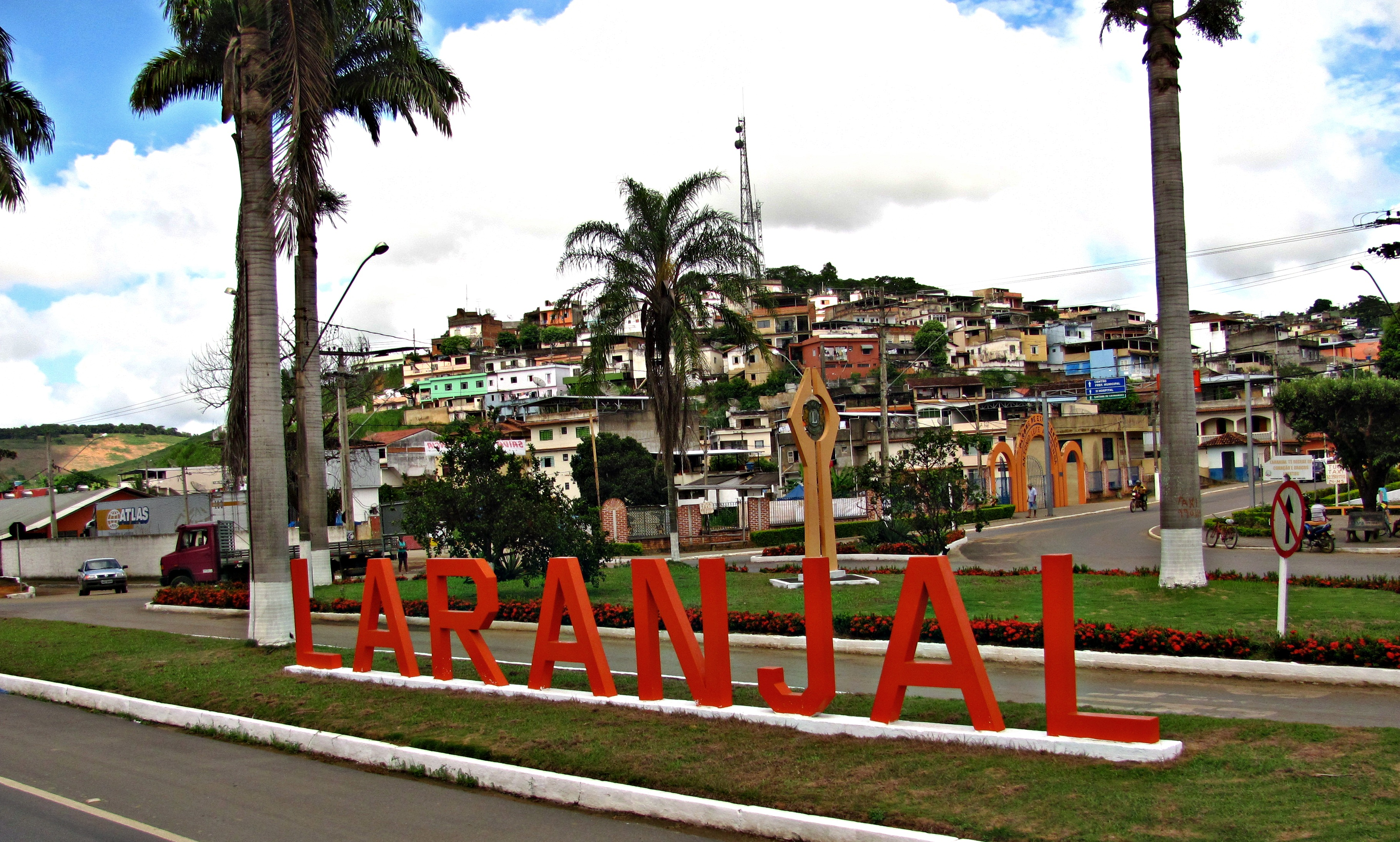

- Coat of arms
- Interactive map of Laranjal, Minas Gerais
- Country: Brazil
- Region: Southeast
- State: Minas Gerais
- Mesoregion: Vale do Rio Doce

Population (2020)
  - Total: 6,833
- Time zone: UTC−3 (BRT)

Laranjal, Minas Gerais is a municipality in the state of Minas Gerais in the Southeast region of Brazil.

== See also ==
- List of municipalities in Minas Gerais
