= Volta Grande =

Human settlement

Coordinates: 21°46′15″S 42°32′20″W

- Municipality
- Interactive map of Volta Grande
- Country: Brazil
- State: Minas Gerais
- Region: Southeast
- Time zone: UTC−3 (BRT)

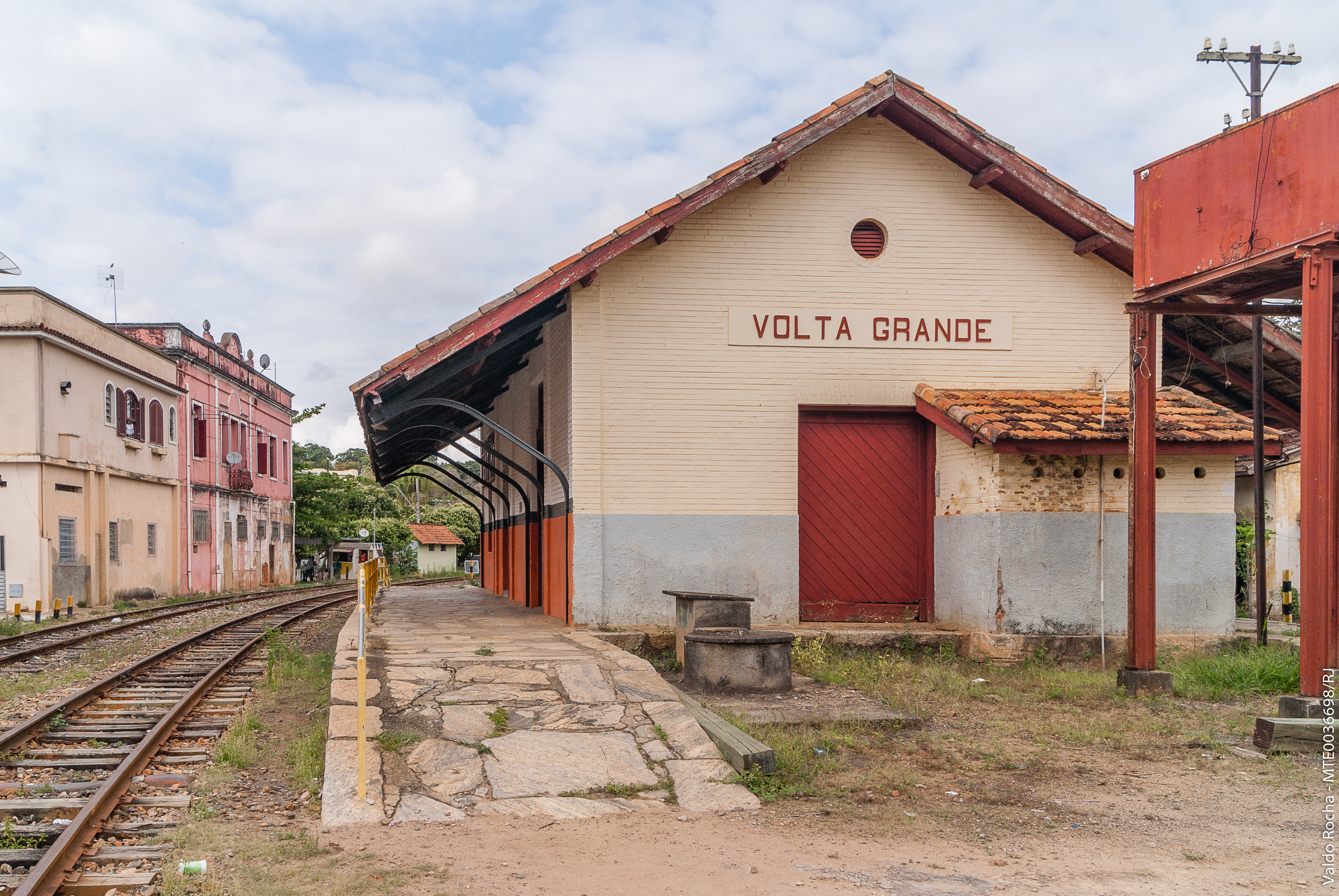
Train station at Volta Grande

Volta Grande is a Brazilian municipality in the state of Minas Gerais. As of 2020 its population was estimated to be 5,261.

== Geography ==
Volta Grande is located in the Zona da Mata mesoregion of Minas Gerais near the border with the state of Rio de Janeiro. The city is 352 km (219 mi) by road from the state capital of Belo Horizonte. It lies at an altitude of 210 m (690 ft).

=== Climate ===
The climate is tropical with rains during the summer and mean annual temperature around 19 °C (66 °F), with variations between 15 °C (59 °F) (average minimum) and 23 °C (73 °F) (mean maximum).

=== Hydrography ===
The rivers Paraiba do Sul and Angu drain the municipality of Volta Grande which is part of the Paraiba do Sul river basin.

== History ==
The town originated from a village formed in 1835 and was elevated to a district of the municipality of Alem Paraíba in 1891. Emancipation came in 1938.

== Notable people ==
It is the birthplace of film director Humberto Mauro.

== See also ==
- List of municipalities in Minas Gerais
