= Santo Antônio do Aventureiro =

- Municipality
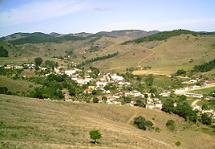

- Location in Minas Gerais state

- Location in Brazil
- Coordinates: 21°45′28″S 42°48′57″W
- Country: Brazil
- Region: Southeast
- State: Minas Gerais

Area
  - Total: 202.03 km^{2} (78.00 sq mi)

Population (2020)
  - Total: 3,602
  - Density: 17.83/km^{2} (46.18/sq mi)
- Time zone: UTC−3 (BRT)
- Website: www.stoantonioaventureiro.mg.gov.br

Santo Antônio do Aventureiro is a municipality in the state of Minas Gerais, Brazil. The population is 3,602 (2020 est.) in an area of 202.03 km^{2}. The elevation is 385 m. It became an independent municipality in 1962.

== See also ==
- List of municipalities in Minas Gerais
