= Além Paraíba =

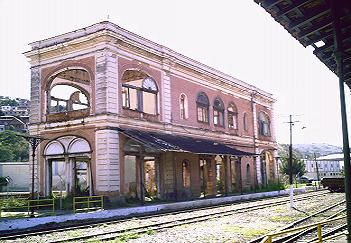
- Porto Novo Old Railway Station

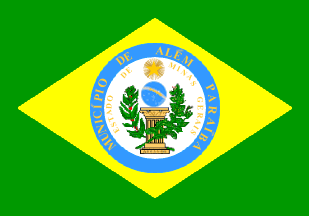
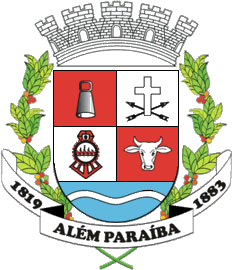
- Flag Coat of arms

- Location in Minas Gerais
- Coordinates: 21°53′16″S 42°42′14″W
- Country: Brazil
- Region: Southeast
- State: Minas Gerais
- Founded: September 28, 1883

Government
  - Mayor: Sérgio Antônio Ribeiro Ferreira

Area
  - Total: 511.199 km^{2} (197.375 sq mi)
- Elevation: 140 m (460 ft)

Population (2020)
  - Total: 35,401
  - Density: 69.6/km^{2} (180/sq mi)
- Time zone: UTC−3 (BRT)
- Website: alemparaiba.mg.gov.br

Além Paraíba is a city in the southeastern Zona da Mata region of Minas Gerais, Brazil. The name indicates its position on the far bank (from Rio de Janeiro) of the Rio Paraíba do Sul. It was known as São José d'Além Parahyba until 1923.

== Railways ==
Além Paraíba was at the junction of the Estrada de Ferro Central do Brasil (1871) and the Estrada de Ferro Leopoldina (1873). The grand but somewhat ruinous main station (Porto Novo) now houses a small railway museum dedicated to the EF Leopoldina.

The Empreza Ferro Carril Além Parahyba followed in 1895 with a 4 km mule railway to Saúde which ran along the main streets and was electrified in 1925 but closed following a fatal accident in 1939. The tracks are still in existence.

== Districts ==
The city comprises the following districts:

- Banqueta
- Bela Vista
- Boiadeiro
- Esplanada
- Goiabal
- Granja
- Ilha Gama Cerqueira
- Ilha do Lazareto
- Ilha Recreio
- Jaqueira
- Jardim Paraíso
- Morro dos Cabritos
- Morro da Conceição
- Morro do Cipó
- Parada Breves
- Porto Novo
- Porto Velho
- Praça da Bandeira
- Santa Marta
- Santa Rita
- Santa Rosa
- São Geraldo
- São José
- São Sebastião
- Sítio Branco
- Terra do Santo
- Terreirão
- Timbira
- Vila Caxias
- Vila Laroca

== See also ==
- List of municipalities in Minas Gerais
- Angustura, a town north of the city, a seat of a district belonging to the city of Além Paraíba.
