= Recreio =

Coordinates: 21°31′30″S 42°28′08″W

- Municipality
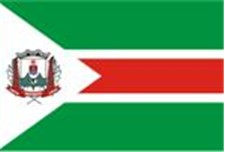
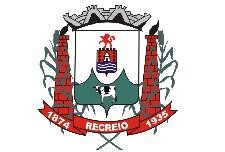
- Flag Coat of arms
- Interactive map of Recreio
- Country: Brazil
- Region: Southeast
- State: Minas Gerais
- Mesoregion: Vale do Rio Doce

Population (2020)
  - Total: 10,520
- Time zone: UTC−3 (BRT)

Recreio is a municipality in the state of Minas Gerais in the Southeast region of Brazil.

== See also ==
- List of municipalities in Minas Gerais
