= Abrahão =

Abrahão or Abraão is a Portuguese language surname and given name. It may be a variant of Abraham. The name is most prevalent in Brazil, and more common as a surname. The name may refer to:

== People ==
=== Given name ===
- Abrahão de Moraes (1916–1970), Brazilian astronomer and mathematician
- Abraão José Bueno (born 1977), Brazilian serial killer
- Abraão Lincoln Martins (born 1983), Brazilian football player
- Abrahão Pio dos Santos Gourgel (born 1961), Angolan politician
- Anísio Abraão David (born 1938), Brazilian illegal gambling operator

=== Surname ===
- Benjamin Abrahão Botto (1890–1938), Brazilian photographer
- Filipe Abraão (1979–2019), Angolan basketball player
- Miguel M. Abrahão (born 1961), Brazilian writer
- Sophia Abrahão (born 1991), Brazilian singer and actress

== Places ==
- Massamá e Monte Abraão, Portugal
- Vila do Abraão, Brazil
