= Tamoios Ecological Station =

- Estação Ecológica de Tamoios
- IUCN category Ia (strict nature reserve)
- Location within Brazil
- Nearest city: Rio de Janeiro
- Coordinates: 23°05′02″S 44°30′50″W
- Area: 9,361 hectares (23,130 acres)
- Designation: Ecological station
- Created: 23 January 1990

Tamoios Ecological Station (Portuguese: Estação Ecológica de Tamoios) is a coastal marine ecological station in the state of Rio de Janeiro, Brazil.

== Foundation ==
The coastal marine Ecological Station, which has an area of 9,361 hectares (23,130 acres), was created on 23 January 1990. It is administered by the Chico Mendes Institute for Biodiversity Conservation. It is located in the municipalities of Angra dos Reis and Parati in Rio de Janeiro state. The ecological station comes under the 1980 decree that provides for co-locating nuclear power plants and ecological stations. It is located in the Bay of Ilha Grande, and contains 29 islands and islets. The highest point is 132 metres (433 ft). It also includes the marine environment within a radius of 1 kilometre (0.62 mi), which comprises 4% of the Ilha Grande Bay. The ecological station's area is 96.64% marine and 3.36% land.

The station has IUCN protected area category Ia (strict nature reserve). The overall purpose is to conserve nature and support scientific research. The specific purpose is to protect and monitor a representative sample of the Atlantic maritime island ecosystem and its marine aquatic environment. It is within the 12,400 hectares (31,000 acres) Tamoios Environmental Protection Area, created in 1982. It is part of the 221,754 hectares (547,970 acres) Bocaina Mosaic, created in 2006.

== Climate ==
Annual rainfall is 2,500 millimetres (98 in). Temperatures vary from 19 to 27 °C (66 to 81 °F). The bay is a mixed estuarine system with two ocean intakes, one on each side of Ilha Grande, and the main source of fresh water coming from Sepetiba bay. The coastal mountain range runs close to the coast line. It intercepts humid ocean air and creates a very humid climate, with torrential downpours that cause sudden increases in river flow.

== Ecology ==
The South American tern (Sterna hirundinacea) visits the islands between June and August. Vegetation on the islands is part of the Atlantic Forest biome, and varies considerably depending on the size of the island, soil conditions and degree of human disturbance. It includes low montane formations rich in palm trees and rock formations of grasses, sedges and cacti. There are degraded areas on the islands from deforestation, fires and other inappropriate land use. Fishing in the region has been destructive in the past. It is hoped that the ecological station will serve as a protective shield to the coastal bays, allowing the marine ecosystems to revive. Prohibited activities include landing on the islands, diving, fishing and anchoring.

== Sources ==
- APA de Tamoios (in Portuguese), INEA: Instituto Estadual do Ambiente, archived from the original on 2016-10-04
- Esec de Tamoios (in Portuguese), Chico Mendes Institute for Biodiversity Conservation
- "Estação Ecológica de Tamoios", Ambiente Brasil (in Portuguese)
- Estação Ecológica de Tamoios (in Portuguese), ICMBio
- Mosaico de Unidades de Conservação da Bocaina - SP e RJ (PDF) (in Portuguese), RBMA
- Unidade de Conservação: Estação Ecológica de Tamoios (in Portuguese), MMA: Ministério do Meio Ambiente
