= Tamoios Environmental Protection Area =

Protected area in Rio de Janeiro, Brazil

- Área de Proteção Ambiental de Tamoios
- IUCN category VI (protected area with sustainable use of natural resources)
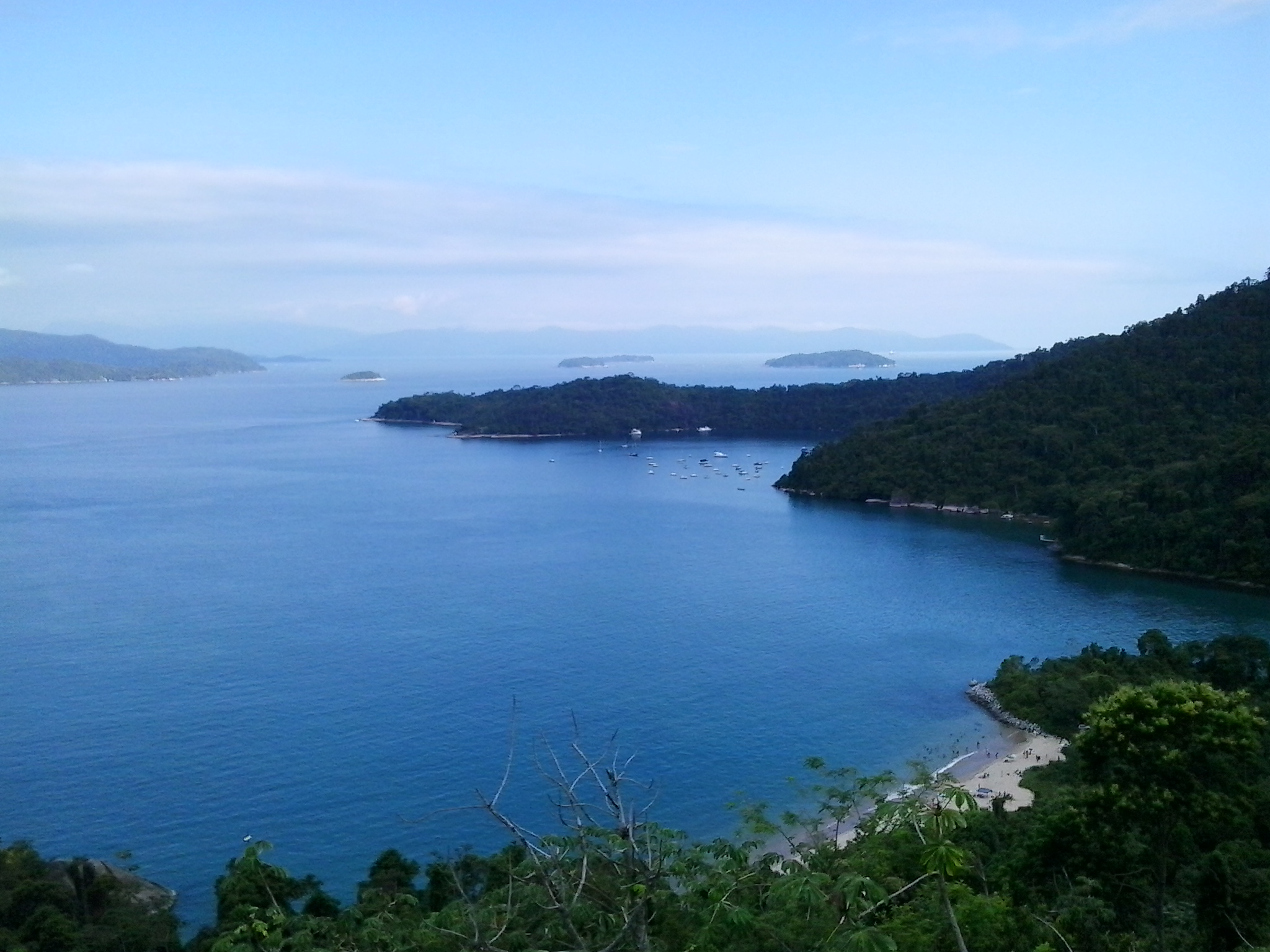
- Baía da Ilha Grande

- Location within Brazil
- Nearest city: Angra dos Reis, Rio de Janeiro
- Coordinates: 23°03′46″S 44°17′09″W
- Area: 21,400 hectares (53,000 acres)
- Designation: Environmental protection area
- Created: 5 December 1982
- Administrator: Fundação Estadual de Engenharia do Meio Ambiente

The Tamoios Environmental Protection Area (Portuguese: Área de Proteção Ambiental de Tamoios) is an environmental protection area of the state of Rio de Janeiro, Brazil. It protects an area of coastal forests, mangroves, rocky shores and islands.

== Location ==
The Tamoios Environmental Protection Area (APA) is in the municipality of Angra dos Reis, Rio de Janeiro, in the region known as the Costa Verde. The APA has a mainland portion covering the Marinah area, and an insular portion covering the Ilha Grande and all other islands in the municipality of Angra dos Reis in the basins of Ilha Grande, Ribeira and Jacuacanga. The APA extends across Angra dos Reis from the mouth of the Mambucaba River, adjacent to the historic village of Mambucaba, in the west on the boundary with the municipality of Paraty to the boundary with the municipality of Mangaratiba in the east. It has an area of 21,400 hectares (53,000 acres). The boundaries contain 90,000 hectares (220,000 acres), but only the land and islands are covered by the decree creating the APA.

The reserve protects extensive areas of mangroves, which are important as breeding areas for fish and shellfish. There are also rocky coasts and restinga areas of great scenic beauty that are home to a rich variety of flora and fauna. There are over 100 islands within the 900 square kilometres (350 sq mi) of Ilha Grande Bay. Lack of regulation and control has allowed the marine ecosystem to degrade and lose biodiversity and landscape quality.

19 of the islands are part of the Tamoios Ecological Station. The APA contains the 36 square kilometres (14 sq mi) Praia do Sul Biological Reserve and the 15 kilometres (9.3 mi) Ilha Grande State Park. The APA also includes 7,173 hectares (17,720 acres) of land that is not fully protected. The Ilha Grande has been part of the Atlantic Forest Biosphere Reserve since 1992. It is part of the Bocaina Mosaic of conservation units.

== History ==
The Tamoios Environmental Protection Area was created by decree 9.452 of the governor of Rio de Janeiro on 5 December 1982. The decree was signed in 1986. The purpose is to protect the natural environment of great scenic beauty, home to rare and endangered species, as well as caiçaras communities integrated into these ecosystems. The master plan was instituted on 1 July 1994.

Decree 41.921 of June 2009 authorized installation of new projects in the wildlife conservation area of the APA, where previously only renovation or expansion of existing buildings was allowed. Since 2011 there has been discussion about creation by the state of an Ilha Grande Marine Environmental Protection Area to control and manage the marine environment. The management plan was approved on 25 April 2013.

== Sources ==
- APA de Tamoios (in Portuguese), INEA: Instituto Estadual do Ambiente, archived from the original on 2016-10-04
- APA de Tamoios (APA) (in Portuguese), ISA: Instituto Socioambiental
- APA-Tamoios - Ilha Grande - RJ (in Portuguese), IlhaGrande.org
- Mosaico de Unidades de Conservação da Bocaina - SP e RJ (PDF) (in Portuguese), RBMA
