= Ilha Grande State Park =

State park in Rio de Janeiro, Brazil

- Parque Estadual da Ilha Grande
- IUCN category II (national park)
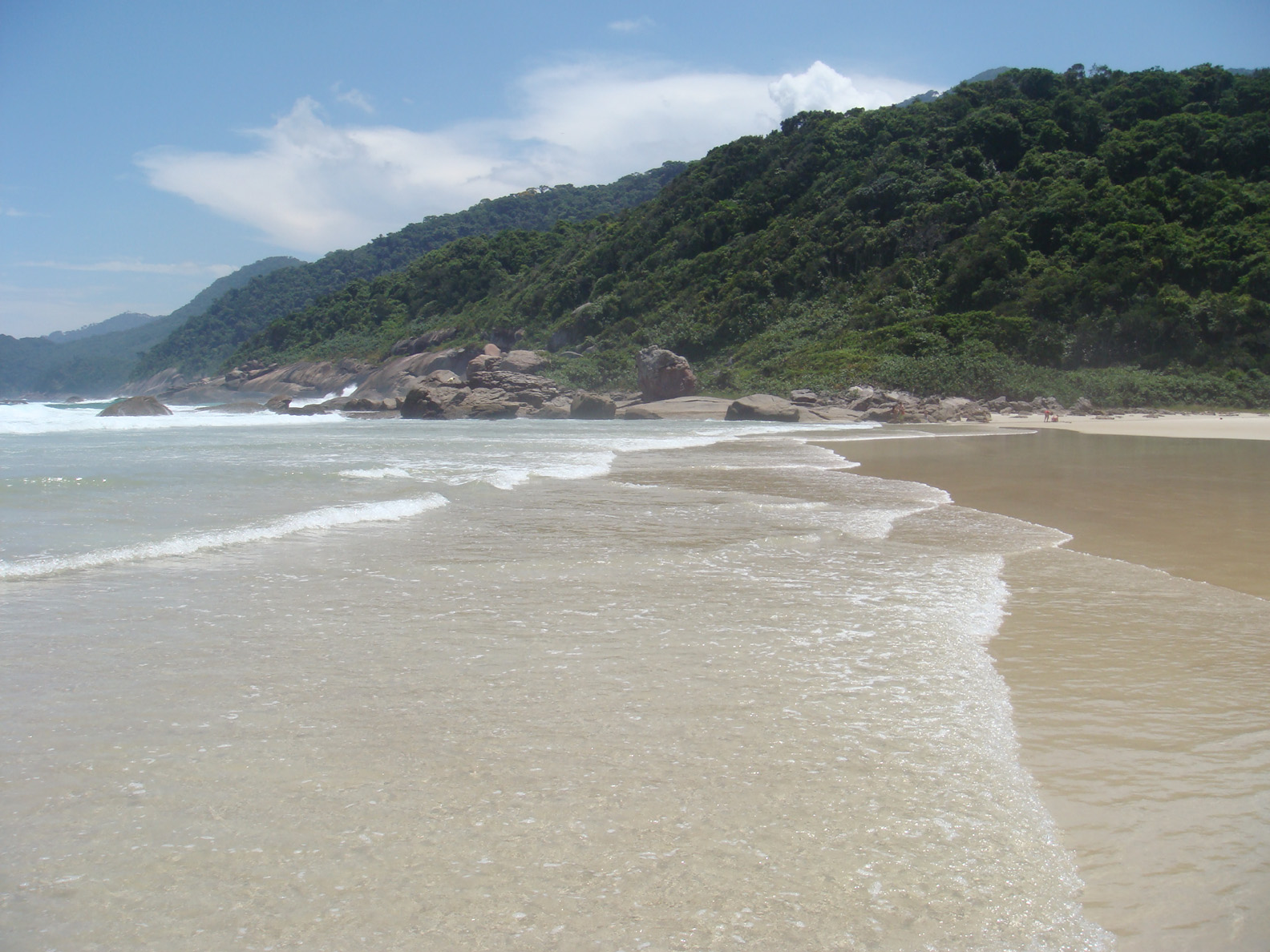
- Lopes Mendes beach

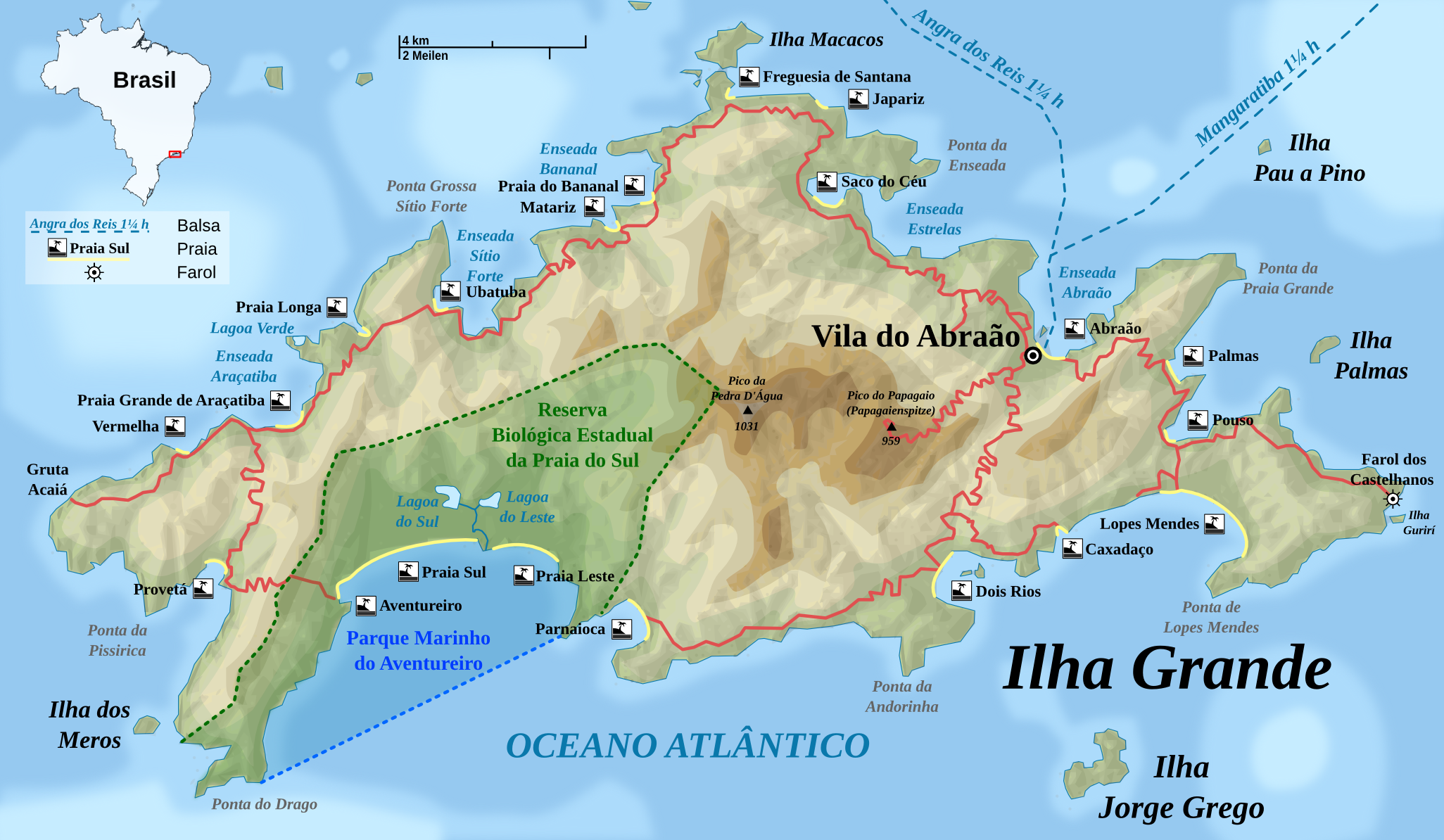
- Nearest city: Angra dos Reis, Rio de Janeiro
- Coordinates: 23.150402°S 44.230350°W
- Area: 12,072 hectares (29,830 acres)
- Designation: State park
- Created: 1971
- Administrator: Instituto Estadual do Ambiente of Rio de Janeiro

UNESCO World Heritage Site
- Part of: Paraty and Ilha Grande – Culture and Biodiversity
- Criteria: Mixed: v, x
- Reference: 1308rev-002
- Inscription: 2019 (43rd Session)

The Ilha Grande State Park (Portuguese: Parque Estadual da Ilha Grande) is a state park in the state of Rio de Janeiro, Brazil.

== Location ==
The Ilha Grande State Park is on the island of Ilha Grande off the south coast of Rio de Janeiro near the border with São Paulo, in the Angra dos Reis municipality. Although within the area of the Bocaina Mosaic of protected areas, as of 2016 the park was not among the mosaic's conservation units. It covers 62.5% of the island, with an area of 12,072 hectares (29,830 acres). Along with the Praia do Sul Biological Reserve and the Aventureiro Sustainable Development Reserve, 87% of the island or 16,972 hectares (41,940 acres) are protected. It is within the 12,400 hectares (31,000 acres) Tamoios Environmental Protection Area, created in 1982.

== Environment ==
The island is made up of mountains with small plains irrigated with dozens of streams of clear water, with pools, rapids and waterfalls. More than 90% of the park is covered by Atlantic Forest. There are also restingas, heaths and mangroves. The island has eight beautiful beaches, separated by section of rocky shore and cliffs that plunge into the sea. The surrounding marine habitat supports a rich marine life. There are archaeological remains of tools and middens from 3,000 years ago. Of more recent date there is an old lighthouse, aqueduct, dam and hydroelectric power plant, the ruins of two prisons, stone paths from the colonial era and several ruined farmhouses.

The state park is administered by the Instituto Estadual do Ambiente of Rio de Janeiro. Any predatory actions that could harm the environment are forbidden, including cutting trees, pulling up seedlings, hunting and fishing, feeding or harming animals, agriculture, or residential, commercial or industrial occupation. The main beaches are supervised. The island still suffers from problems such as growing numbers of visitors, poor garbage collection, lack of sewage treatment, illegal construction and predatory hunting and fishing.

== History ==
The Ilha Grande State Park was created on 28 July 1971 to preserve the natural resources and support tourism on the Ilha Grande. When created the park had an area of 4,330 hectares (10,700 acres). It was officially established with land use regulated on 25 August 1978. It was expanded to cover 12,072 hectares (29,830 acres) in 2007, or 62.5% of the island.

== Sources ==
- APA de Tamoios (in Portuguese), INEA: Instituto Estadual do Ambiente, archived from the original on 2016-10-04

It is part of the 221,754 hectares (547,970 acres) Bocaina Mosaic, created in 2006.

- Mosaico de Unidades de Conservação da Bocaina - SP e RJ (PDF) (in Portuguese), RBMA, archived from the original (PDF) on 2016-10-11
- "Parque Estadual da Ilha Grande - Angra dos Reis - RJ", Ilhagrande.org (in Portuguese)
- "Parque Estadual da Ilha Grande", Ilha Grande (in Portuguese)
