= Aventureiro Sustainable Development Reserve =

Sustainable Development Reserve in Rio de Janeiro

- Reserva de Desenvolvimento Sustentável do Aventureiro
- IUCN category VI (protected area with sustainable use of natural resources)
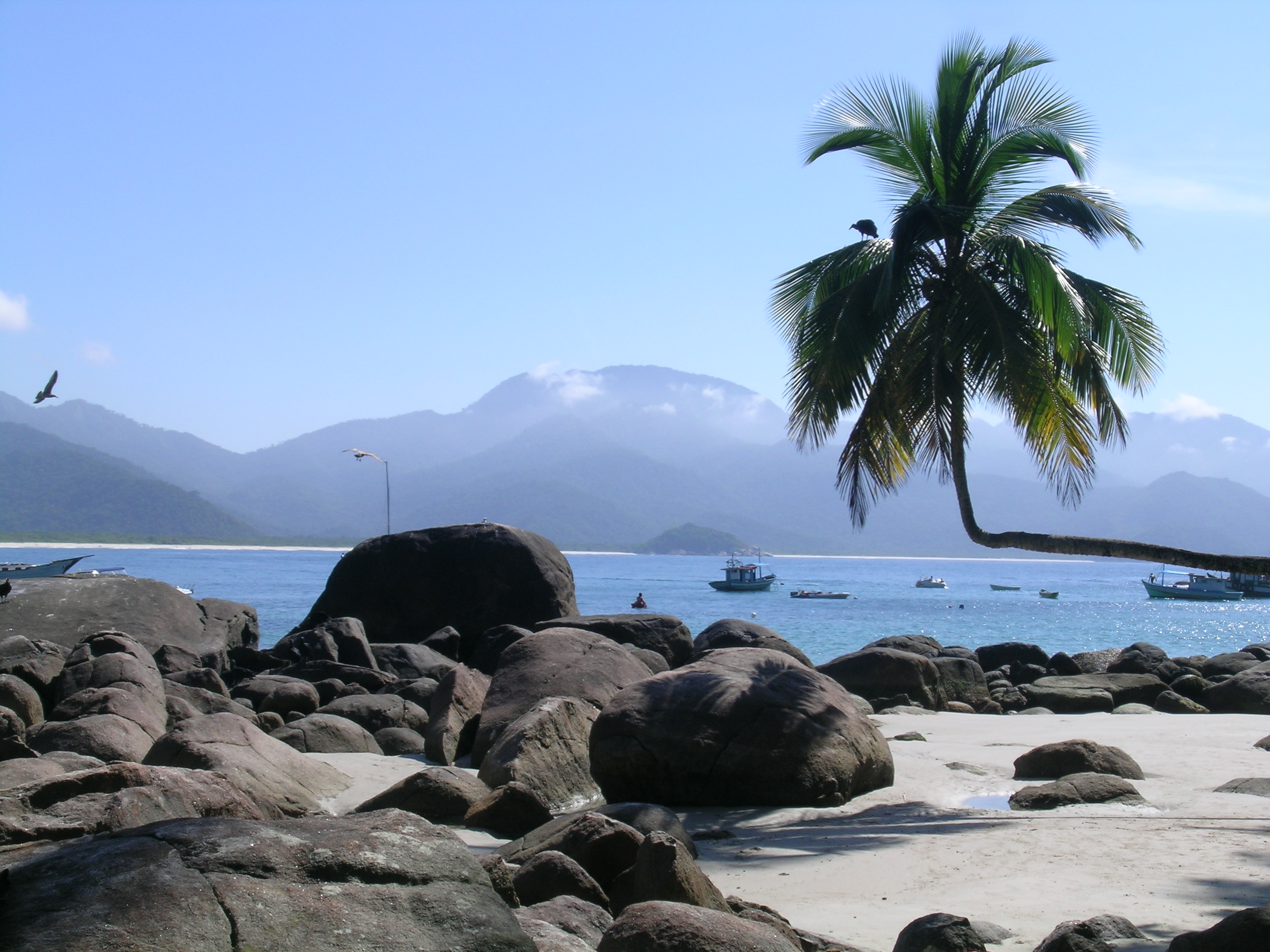
- The bay from the beach

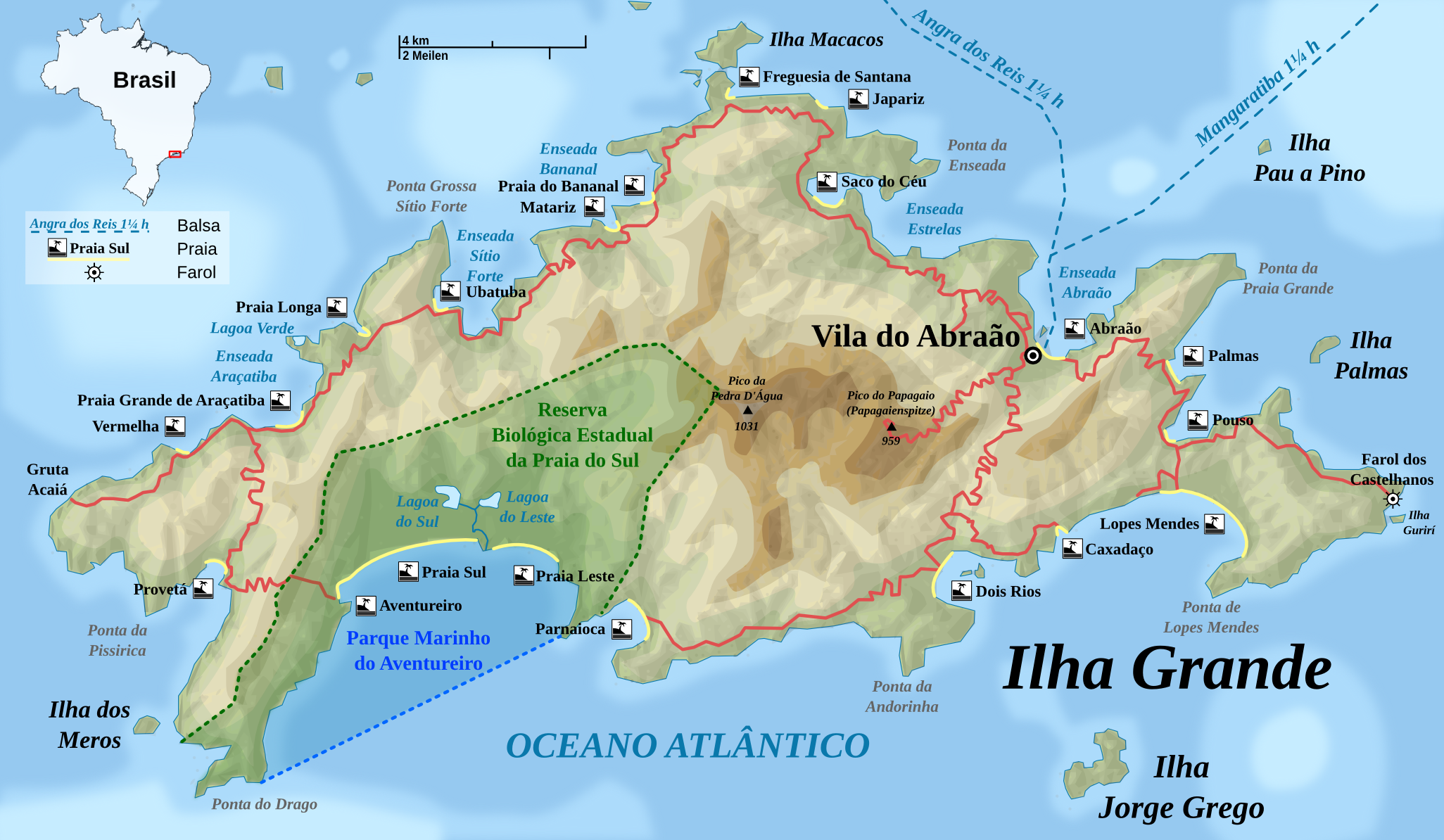
- Ilha Grande. The marine park covers the bay in the southwest.
- Nearest city: Angra dos Reis, Rio de Janeiro
- Coordinates: 23.190933°S 44.299951°W
- Area: 1,312 hectares (3,240 acres)
- Designation: Sustainable development reserve
- Created: 27 November 1990
- Administrator: Instituto Estadual do Ambiente (RJ)

The Aventureiro Sustainable Development Reserve (Portuguese: Reserva de Desenvolvimento Sustentável do Aventureiro), formerly the Aventureiro Marine State Park, is a sustainable development reserve in the state of Rio de Janeiro, Brazil. It supports artisanal fishing by a small traditional community on the Ilha Grande, an island off the southwest coast of the state.

== Location ==
The Aventureiro Sustainable Development Reserve (RDS) is in the municipality of Angra dos Reis, Rio de Janeiro. It has an area of 1,312 hectares (3,240 acres). It covers a small part of the southwest of the Ilha Grande off the south coast of Rio de Janeiro near the border with São Paulo, and the bay in the southwest of the island. The RDS covers a small area of land, plus the bay, shore and rocks up to the high water mark. The Praia do Sul Biological Reserve the remaining land around the bay. 62.5% of the island is covered by the Ilha Grande State Park, making a total of 87% of the island protected.

== History ==
The Aventureiro Marine State Park was created by state decree 15.983 of 27 November 1990. The purpose was to safeguard exceptional natural beauty, flora and fauna for use in education, recreational and scientific purposes. It is part of the Bocaina Mosaic of conservation units.

A caiçaras community had lived in the area for over 150 years. In recognition of their claims, on 28 May 2014 law 6793 authored by deputy Carlos Minc created the Aventureiro RDS from 2.7% of the Praia do Sul Biological Reserve, and the area covered by the Aventureiro Marine Park was incorporated into the RDS. The RDS aims to preserve the ecosystems and also the traditional way of life of the caiçaras fishing community of about 50 families. Only artisanal fishing is allowed, under the control of the Instituto Estadual do Ambiente (State Environmental Institute). It was expected that creation of the RDS would help to protects the biological reserve.

== Sources ==
- Mosaico de Unidades de Conservação da Bocaina - SP e RJ (PDF) (in Portuguese), RBMA, archived from the original (PDF) on 2016-10-11
- "Parque Estadual da Ilha Grande - Angra dos Reis - RJ", Ilhagrande.org (in Portuguese)
- PES Marinho do Aventureiro (in Portuguese), ISA: Instituto Socioambiental
- "Reserva de Desenvolvimento Sustentável do Aventureiro - Ilha Grande - Angra dos", ilhagrande.org (in Portuguese)
