= Serra do Mar Ecological Corridor =

Protected areas in Brazil

- Corredor Ecológico da Serra do Mar
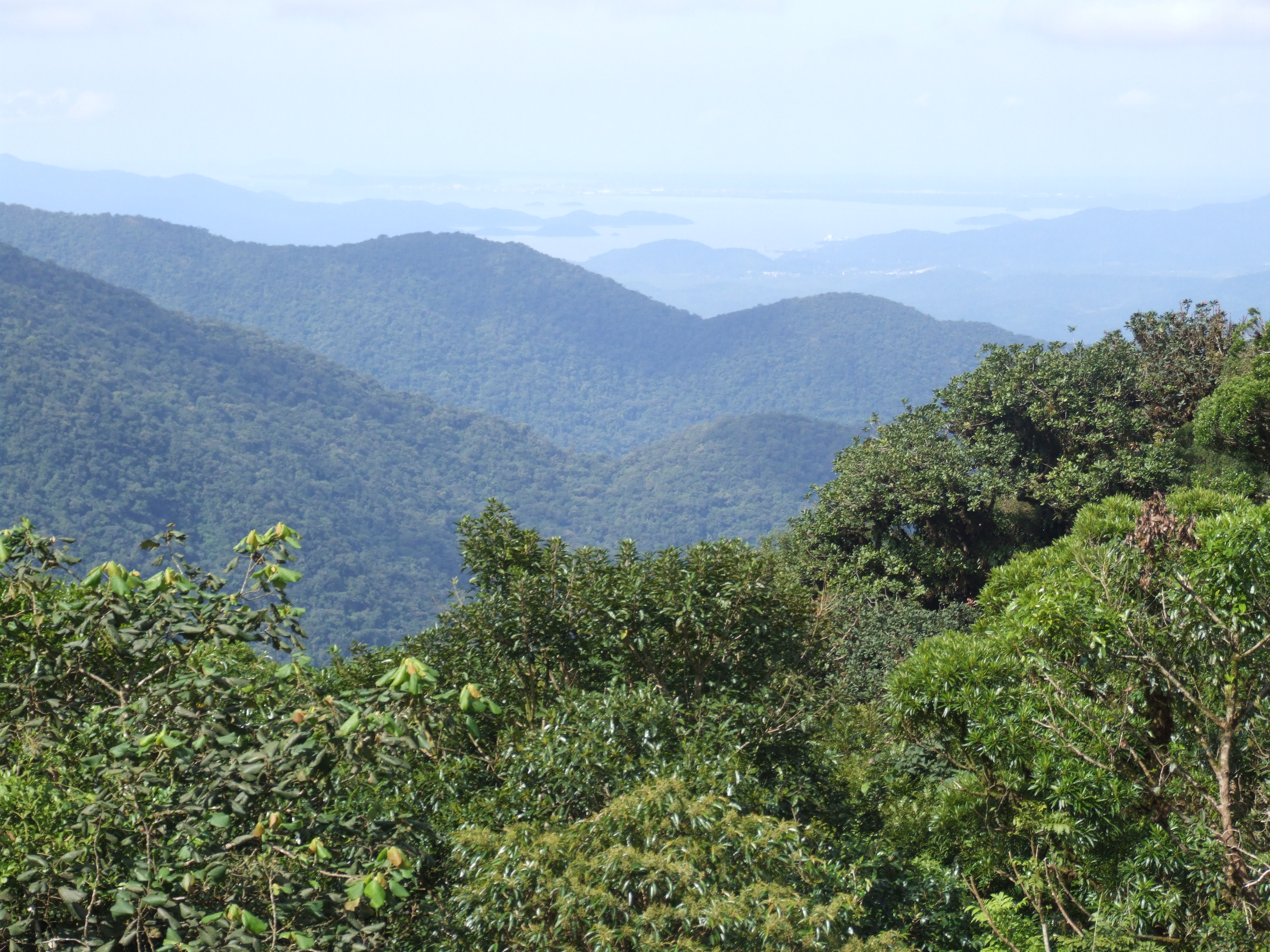
- Antonina Bay from the Serra do Mar

- Location within Brazil
- Coordinates: 25°30′39″S 48°20′36″W
- Designation: Ecological corridor

The Serra do Mar Ecological Corridor (Portuguese: Corredor Ecológico da Serra do Mar or Corredor de Biodiversidade da Serra do Mar) is a large collection of protected areas in the states of Rio de Janeiro, Minas Gerais, São Paulo and Paraná in southern Brazil that form an ecological corridor connecting areas of Atlantic Forest.

== Extent ==
The Serra do Mar Ecological Corridor extends from Paraná to Rio de Janeiro and covers about 12,600,000 hectares (31,000,000 acres). It encompasses some of the most densely populated areas of Brazil, within which there are several important fragments of Atlantic Forest. The corridor is one of the areas with the richest biodiversity in the Atlantic Forest.

== Purpose ==
An ecological corridor is an area of great biological importance that consists of a network of protected areas interspersed with varying levels of human occupation and different forms of land use. The corridor provides integrated management to ensure the survival all species, maintain ecological and evolutionary processes, and develop a strong regional economy based on sustainable use of natural resources. It allows for the flow of plant and animal genes between the protected areas, thus maintaining genetic diversity.

== Mosaics ==
Protected area mosaics have the potential to strengthen ecological corridors by expanding the scale of conservation planning and increasing the chances of reconnecting natural areas within and between the mosaics. The Serra do Mar Ecological Corridor contains several protected area mosaics. The Lagamar Mosaic, covering 2,119,000 hectares (5,240,000 acres), was created in May 2006. It has great importance in conserving Atlantic Forest, and is supported by SOS Mata Atlântica and by the Atlantic Forest Biosphere Reserve. It was the second mosaic to be created in Brazil, after the Piauí Mosaic, created in March 2005.

A project to create three new protected area mosaics began in December 2005, coordinated by the National Council of the Atlantic Forest Biosphere Reserve. These were the Bocaina Mosaic, Central Rio de Janeiro Atlantic Forest Mosaic and Mantiqueira Mosaic. Funding was provided by Conservation International, the Fund for the Global Environment Facility (GEF), the Government of Japan, the MacArthur Foundation and the World Bank. The Ministry of the Environment gave the mosaics formal structure in March 2007. Their purpose is to give integrated management of different conservation units in a region, including federal, state, municipal and private units, which may be different form of strictly protected or sustainable use unit.

Together the three new mosaics included 51 units covering over 900,000 hectares (2,200,000 acres) in the states of Rio de Janeiro, Minas Gerais and São Paulo. The Bocaina Mosaic has an area of 221,754 hectares (547,970 acres) and contains 10 conservation units and their buffer zones on the southern coast of Rio de Janeiro and the northern coast of São Paulo. The Central Coastal Atlantic Forest Mosaic has an area of 233,710 hectares (577,500 acres) and contains 22 conservation units and their buffer zones in Rio de Janeiro. The Mantiqueira Mosaic has an area of 445,615 hectares (1,101,140 acres) and contains 19 conservation units and their buffer zones in Rio de Janeiro, São Paulo and Minas Gerais.

== Sources ==
- "Corredor ecológico da Serra do Mar", Acervo da Folha do Meio (in Portuguese), FMA: Folha do Meio Ambiente, 20 December 2006, archived from the original on 23 September 2016
- "Contextualização do Parque Estadual da Ilha do Mel" (PDF), Plano de Manejo - Parque Estadual Ilha do Mel (in Portuguese), STCP Engenharia de Projetos Ltda., 2011
- Lino, Clayton Ferreira; Albuquerque, João Lucílio; Dias, Heloisa (2007), Mosaicos de unidades de conservação no Corredor da Serra do Mar (PDF) (in Portuguese), São Paulo: Conselho Nacional da Reserva da Biosfera da Mata Atlântica
