= Praia do Sul Biological Reserve =

Protected area on Ilha Grande, Brazil

Praia do Sul State Biological Reserve
- Reserva Biológica Estadual da Praia do Sul
- IUCN category Ia (strict nature reserve)
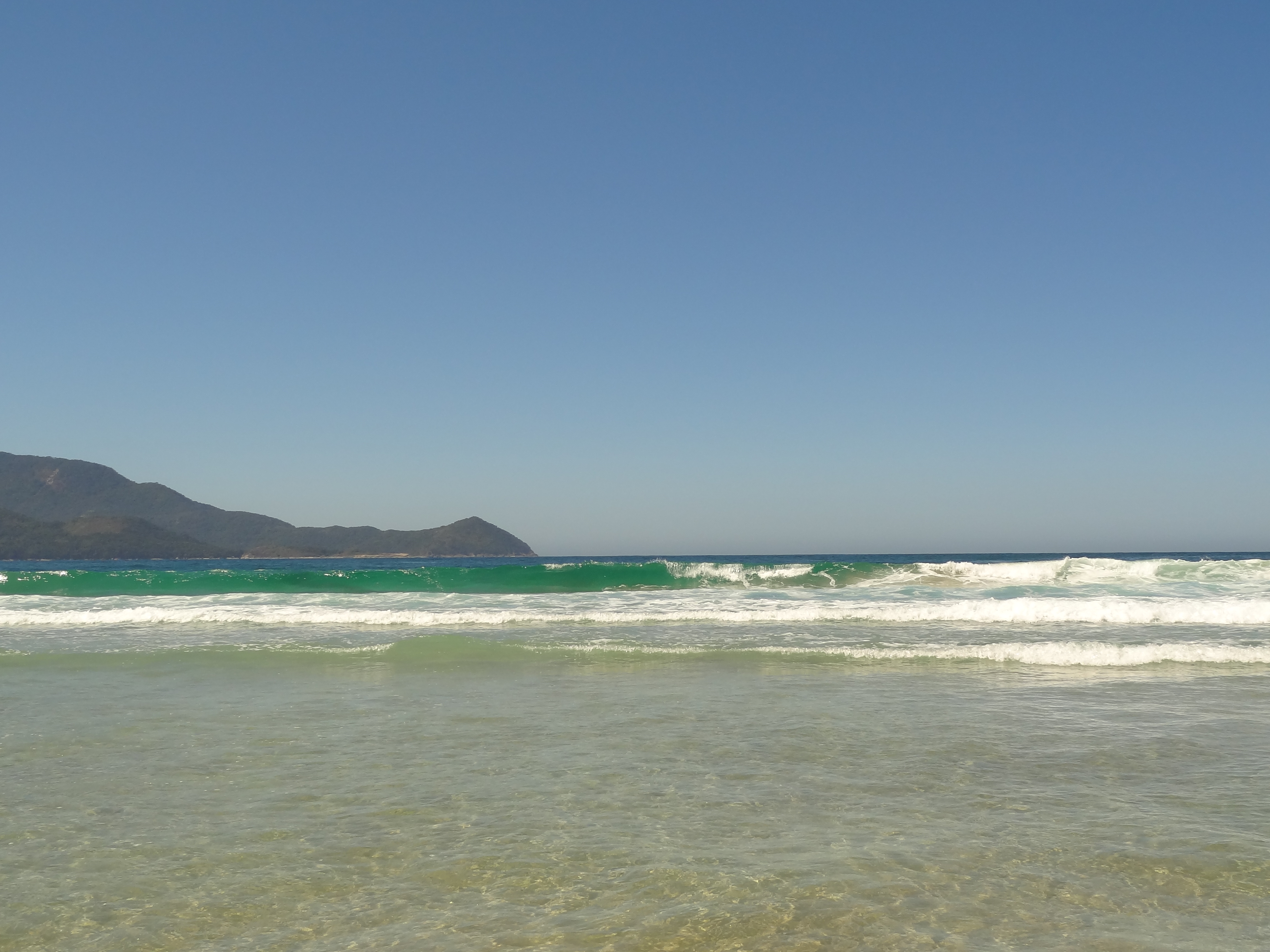
- View from the beach in 2012

- Location within Brazil
- Nearest city: Angra dos Reis, Rio de Janeiro
- Coordinates: 23°10′34″S 44°17′17″W
- Area: 3,502 hectares (8,650 acres)
- Designation: Biological reserve
- Created: 2 December 1981

UNESCO World Heritage Site
- Part of: Paraty and Ilha Grande – Culture and Biodiversity
- Criteria: Mixed: v, x
- Reference: 1308rev-003
- Inscription: 2019 (43rd Session)

Praia do Sul State Biological Reserve (Portuguese: Reserva Biológica Estadual da Praia do Sul) is a biological reserve on the island of Ilha Grande, in the State of Rio de Janeiro, in Brazil.

== History ==
The reserve was created on 2 December 1981 on Praia do Sul, Ilha Grande, in the municipality of Angra dos Reis. The purpose was to preserve the natural ecosystems home to indigenous flora and fauna. It was integrated with the 1,312 hectares (3,240 acres) Aventureiro Marine State Park, created in 1990, which covers the shores and waters of the bay to the south of the reserve. It is within the 12,400 hectares (31,000 acres) Tamoios Environmental Protection Area, created in 1982. It is part of the 221,754 hectares (547,970 acres) Bocaina Mosaic, created in 2006.

On 28 May 2014 the area was reduced by 2.7% to accommodate the Vila do Aventureiro. The area is now about 3,502 hectares (8,650 acres). The former marine state park and the small part of the biological reserve is now the Aventureiro Sustainable Development Reserve. A skeleton found in the reserve was dated to 3,000 years ago, and showed that he was a strong rower and expert diver.

== Status ==
As of 2009 the State Biological Reserve was a "strict nature reserve" under IUCN protected area category Ia, with a total area of 3,447 hectares (8,520 acres). The reserve is open only for educational or research purposes. About half of the reserve is covered in dense Atlantic Forest, with many species of flora and fauna including parrots, otters, woodpeckers, shore birds, monkeys, armadillos, pacas and snakes. There is a rich variety of rainforest trees and large mangroves. Along with the Ilha Grande State Park about 87% of the island or 16,972 hectares (41,940 acres) are protected.

== Sources ==
- APA de Tamoios (in Portuguese), INEA: Instituto Estadual do Ambiente
- Mosaico de Unidades de Conservação da Bocaina - SP e RJ (PDF) (in Portuguese), RBMA
- "Parque Estadual da Ilha Grande - Angra dos Reis - RJ", Ilhagrande.org (in Portuguese)
- PES Marinho do Aventureiro (in Portuguese), ISA: Instituto Socioambiental
- "Reserva Biológica da Praia do Sul - Ilha Grande - Angra dos Reis - RJ", IlhaGrande.org, 15 December 2015
- Reserva Biológica Estadual da Praia do Sul (in Portuguese), INEA
- "Reserva de Desenvolvimento Sustentável do Aventureiro - Ilha Grande - Angra dos", ilhagrande.org (in Portuguese)
- Triana, Elisa (29 May 2009), "Strict Nature Reserves in Brazil", The Encyclopedia of Earth
