= Atlantic Forest Biosphere Reserve =

Protected area in Brazil

- Mata Atlântica Biosphere Reserve
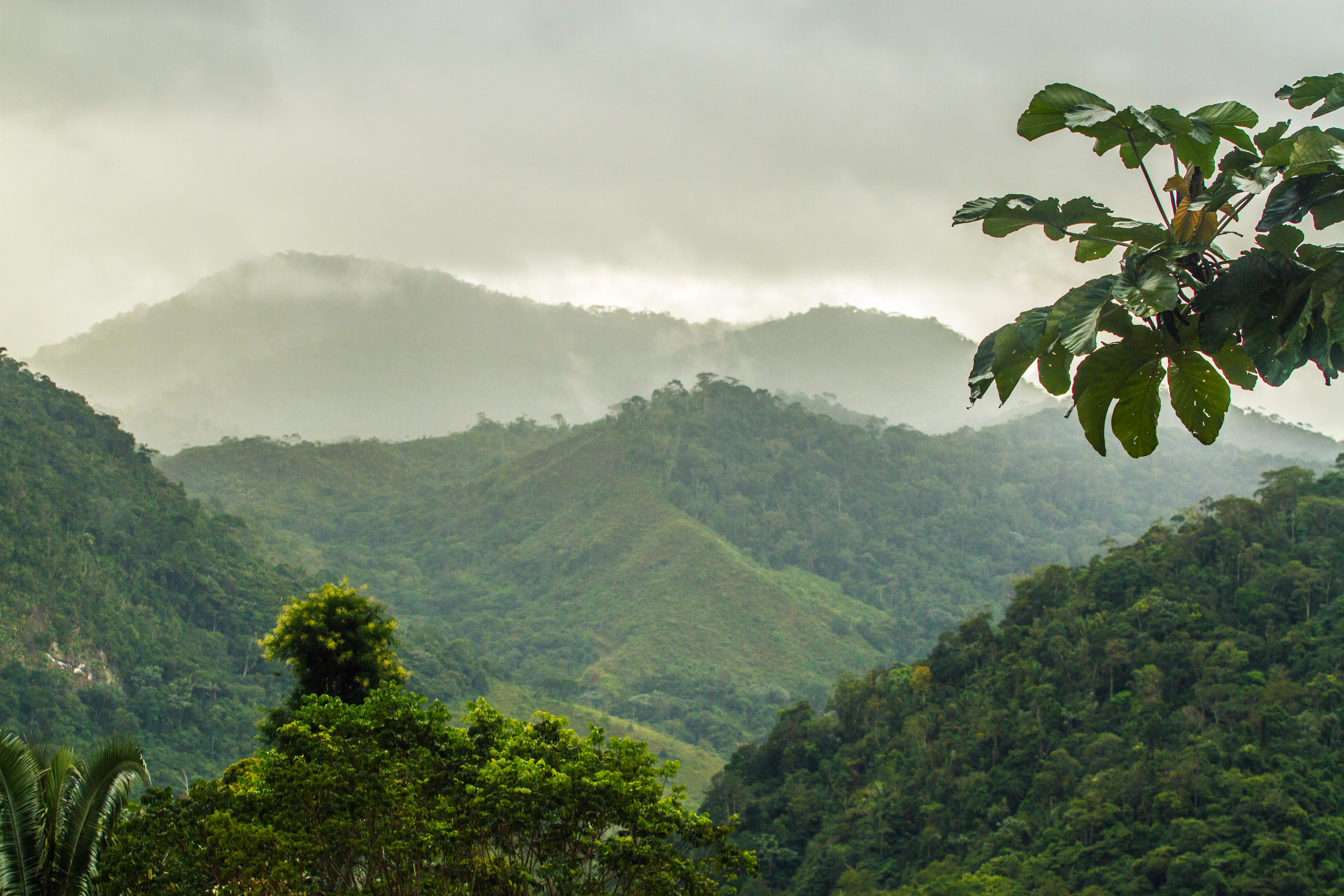
- Alto Cariri National Park, Guaratinga, Bahia, Brazil

- Location within Brazil
- Coordinates: 25.388872°S 48.556029°W
- Area: 62,319,744 hectares (153,995,440 acres) (Note: As of 2016 the RBMA official website gave an area of 62,319,744 hectares (153,995,440 acres), while UNESCO gave an area of 29,473,484 hectares (72,830,570 acres). Possibly there was a delay in recognition of the more recent expansions.)
- Designation: Biosphere reserve
- Created: 1991
- Administrator: Conselho Nacional da Reserva da Biosfera da Mata Atlântica; Forest Institute of São Paulo (Instituto Florestal)
- Website: www.rbma.org.br/rbma/index_rbma.asp

The Atlantic Forest Biosphere Reserve, or Mata Atlântica Biosphere Reserve (MABR, Portuguese: Reserva da Biosfera da Mata Atlântica), is a biosphere reserve covering remnants of the Atlantic Forest in Brazil, including fully protected and sustainable use conservation units and buffer zones. It is the largest such reserve in the world.

== Extent ==
The Atlantic Forest Biosphere Reserve (MABR) extends for 3,000 kilometres (1,900 mi) parallel to the coast of Brazil along the Serra Mantiqueira, Serra Geral and Serra do Mar from 02°50'S to 33°45'S, and from 34°45'W to 55°15'W. As of 2011 UNESCO reported that the reserve had a total area of 29,473,484 hectares (72,830,570 acres), including core areas of 4,052,544 hectares (10,014,050 acres), buffer zones of 12,646,302 hectares (31,249,690 acres) and transition areas of 12,774,638 hectares (31,566,820 acres). It ranges in altitude from −50 to 2,897 metres (−164 to 9,505 ft) above sea level.

The reserve includes remnants of Atlantic Forest in 15 states, including Minas Gerais, Mato Grosso do Sul, and the coastal states of Ceará, Rio Grande do Norte, Paraíba, Pernambuco, Alagoas, Sergipe, Bahia, Espírito Santo, Rio de Janeiro, São Paulo, Paraná, Santa Catarina and Rio Grande do Sul. As of 2016 the reserve covered parts of over 1,000 municipalities. The surrounding areas had 120 million inhabitants and accounted for 70% of the GDP of Brazil. The core zones consisted of more than 700 fully protected conservation units. A few thousand people lived in the buffer zones, mainly traditional communities of indigenous people, quilombolas, fishermen and so on.

== Ecosystems ==
The Atlantic Forest Biosphere Reserve covers tropical humid forests in mountain and highland systems and coastal marine environments. It includes remnants of the Atlantic Forest and relevant secondary forests. The moist, sub-tropical, semi-deciduous forest includes species such as Araucaria angustifolia, Podocarpus lambertii and Drimys brasiliensis. Associated ecosystems include upland meadows with grasses and small heaths, cerrado, mangroves, salt marsh scrublands and sand spits. These lie in the most densely populated parts of Brazil, resulting in threats to their environmental integrity.

93% of the Atlantic Forest has been destroyed. The remnants contain 171 of the 202 threatened species in Brazil, including golden lion tamarins and several near-extinct forest cats. The many protected areas in the biosphere reserve include the Caraça Natural Park, the Itatiaia National Park and the privately owned Caratinga Biological Station, home to a population of the highly endangered woolly spider monkeys, three other primates and more than 200 rare birds.

== History ==
One of the triggers for creating the biosphere reserve was a catastrophic landslide on several slopes of the Serra do Mar in 1985, caused by deforestation that had resulted from pollution from the industrial center of Cubatão. The 1988 constitution of Brazil declared that the Atlantic Forest was National Patrimony. The Atlantic Forest Biosphere Reserve was defined in 1991, covering a few parts of Rio de Janeiro, São Paulo and Paraná. Non-government organizations played an important role in its creation. In 1992 it covered about 2,499,990 hectares (6,177,600 acres), with 356,998 hectares (882,160 acres) of sea. The Atlantic Forest Biosphere Reserve was the first biosphere reserve in Brazil. It was recognized by UNESCO's Man and the Biosphere Programme in 1993.

From 1992 to 2002 the biosphere reserve was expanded in four phases to include 15 states (including Mato Grosso do Sul) covering about 35,000,000 hectares (86,000,000 acres) divided into core, buffer and transition zones. The São Paulo City Green Belt Biosphere Reserve was added in 1994. It covers 73 municipalities in São Paulo state including the city of São Paulo. Six phases had been completed by 2008. In 2008 it had an estimated area of 62,319,744 hectares (153,995,440 acres), including 16,149,934 hectares (39,907,360 acres) of sea. This makes it the largest forested biosphere reserve in the world. The core zones, either in fully protected conservation units or in other legally protected areas such as mangroves and riparian forests, covered 7,300,000 hectares (18,000,000 acres).

== Organization and activities ==
The reserve is administered by the Conselho Nacional da Reserva da Biosfera da Mata Atlântica and the Forest Institute of São Paulo (Instituto Florestal). The management approach involves partnerships and processes in which a wide variety of stakeholders participate. The national council includes representatives of federal, state and municipal governments, non-government organizations, scientists, business leaders and residents of the reserve. There are state-level committees in almost all the states. The objective is to support large-scale conservation and management of the ecosystems. This includes conserving and restoring ecological corridors, and conserving and restoring the rich biological diversity of the Atlantic Forest. Other objectives include development of sustainable usage and social practices.

A project to create three new protected area mosaics in the Serra do Mar Ecological Corridor began in December 2005, coordinated by the National Council of the Atlantic Forest Biosphere Reserve. These were the Bocaina Mosaic, Central Rio de Janeiro Atlantic Forest Mosaic and Mantiqueira Mosaic. Funding was provided by Conservation International, the Fund for the Global Environment Facility (GEF), the Government of Japan, the MacArthur Foundation and the World Bank. The Ministry of the Environment gave the mosaics formal structure in March 2007. Their purpose is to give integrated management of different conservation units in a region, including federal, state, municipal and private units, which may be different form of strictly protected or sustainable use unit.

The biosphere reserve has managed to obtain large amounts of funding from international sources such as the World Bank, Inter-American Development Bank and KfW cooperation bank, has managed to have several World Heritage Sites recognized in the Atlantic Forest biome, and has made significant contributions to environmental awareness and education in Brazil. Programs include:

- Core zone conservation and research program
- Forestry resources program
- Eco-tourism program
- Water and forest program
- Annual Mata Atlantica Update
- Public policy program
- International cooperation program

== Sources ==
- Baptista, Sandra Regina (2008), Forest Recovery and Just Sustainability in the Florianopolis City-region (Thesis), ProQuest, ISBN 978-1-109-06209-0
- Biosphere Reserve Information – Brazil – MATA ATLÂNTICA (INCLUDING SAO PAULO CITY GREEN BELT), UNESCO
- Brown, Jessica; Mitchell, Nora J.; Beresford, Michael (2005), The Protected Landscape Approach: Linking Nature, Culture and Community, IUCN, ISBN 978-2-8317-0797-6
- "Corredor ecológico da Serra do Mar", Acervo da Folha do Meio (in Portuguese), FMA: Folha do Meio Ambiente, 20 December 2006, archived from the original on 2016-09-23
- Leal, Carlos Galindo; Câmara, Ibsen de Gusmão (2003), The Atlantic Forest of South America: Biodiversity Status, Threats, and Outlook, Island Press, ISBN 978-1-55963-989-7
- Nemeth, Darlyne G.; Kuriansky, Judy; Hamilton, Robert B (2012-09-20), Living in an Environmentally Traumatized World: Healing Ourselves and Our Planet, ABC-CLIO, ISBN 978-0-313-39732-5
- Platt, Rutherford H. (2006), The Humane Metropolis: People and Nature in the 21st-century City, Univ of Massachusetts Press, ISBN 1-55849-554-1
- Riley, Laura; Riley, William (2005), Nature's Strongholds: The World's Great Wildlife Reserves, Princeton University Press, ISBN 0-691-12219-9
- Schreurs, Miranda; Papadakis, Elim (2009-09-21), The A to Z of the Green Movement, Scarecrow Press, ISBN 978-0-8108-7041-3
- Texto Síntese (in Portuguese), RBMA
