= Vila do Abraão =

Village in Ilha Grande, Brazil

Coordinates: 23°09′S 44°10′W

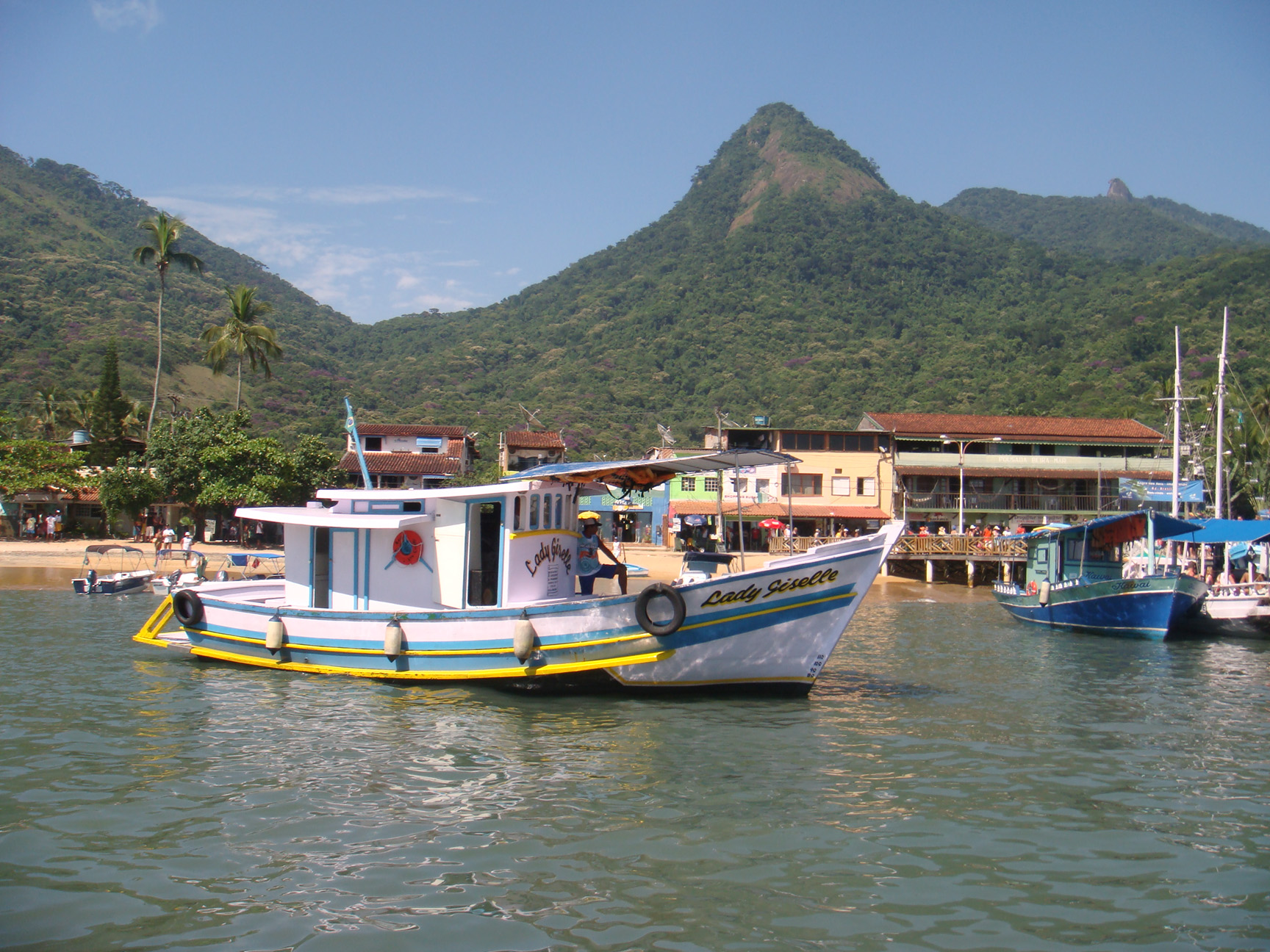
Porto do Abraão.

Vila do Abraão is a village in Ilha Grande, Brazil. It is part of the Angra dos Reis municipality in the state of Rio de Janeiro.

The village is located in a cove and is the largest urban center on the island, with roughly 3,000 inhabitants. It contains most of the island's infrastructure and is therefore considered the "capital" of the island.

== History ==
The settlement of the region began in the colonial period. The most accepted hypothesis for the origin of the name abraão (not to be confused with the mistranslation "Abraham") relates to the term abra in old Portuguese, meaning "bay". Thus, the name refers to the large bay that is the location.

The development of Vila do Abraão gained momentum in the late nineteenth century, at the time of the Empire of Brazil, when a leper hospital was built nearby. The leper hospital was built between 1884 and 1887, and served the dual purpose of hosting immigrants arriving by ship to Brazil, where the passengers were given health screenings and ships were disinfected. From the 1930s, the leper hospital was used as a military base and prison, and was demolished in the 1950s.

Vila do Abraão gained new momentum in 1994, when the nearby prison was closed down. The attractions of the island supported the rapid development of tourism, transforming the town into a tourist hub. Hostels, bars, and restaurants were constructed, and sea and land trails were developed connecting the town to the beaches and other attractions of Ilha Grande.

The village has a pier where ferry boats transporting passengers and goods between the village and Angra dos Reis and Mangaratiba dock daily. Also making use of the dock and pier are sloops and schooners that transport tourists to other places on the island.
