= Ilha Grande =

Island located off the coast of Rio de Janeiro state, Brazil

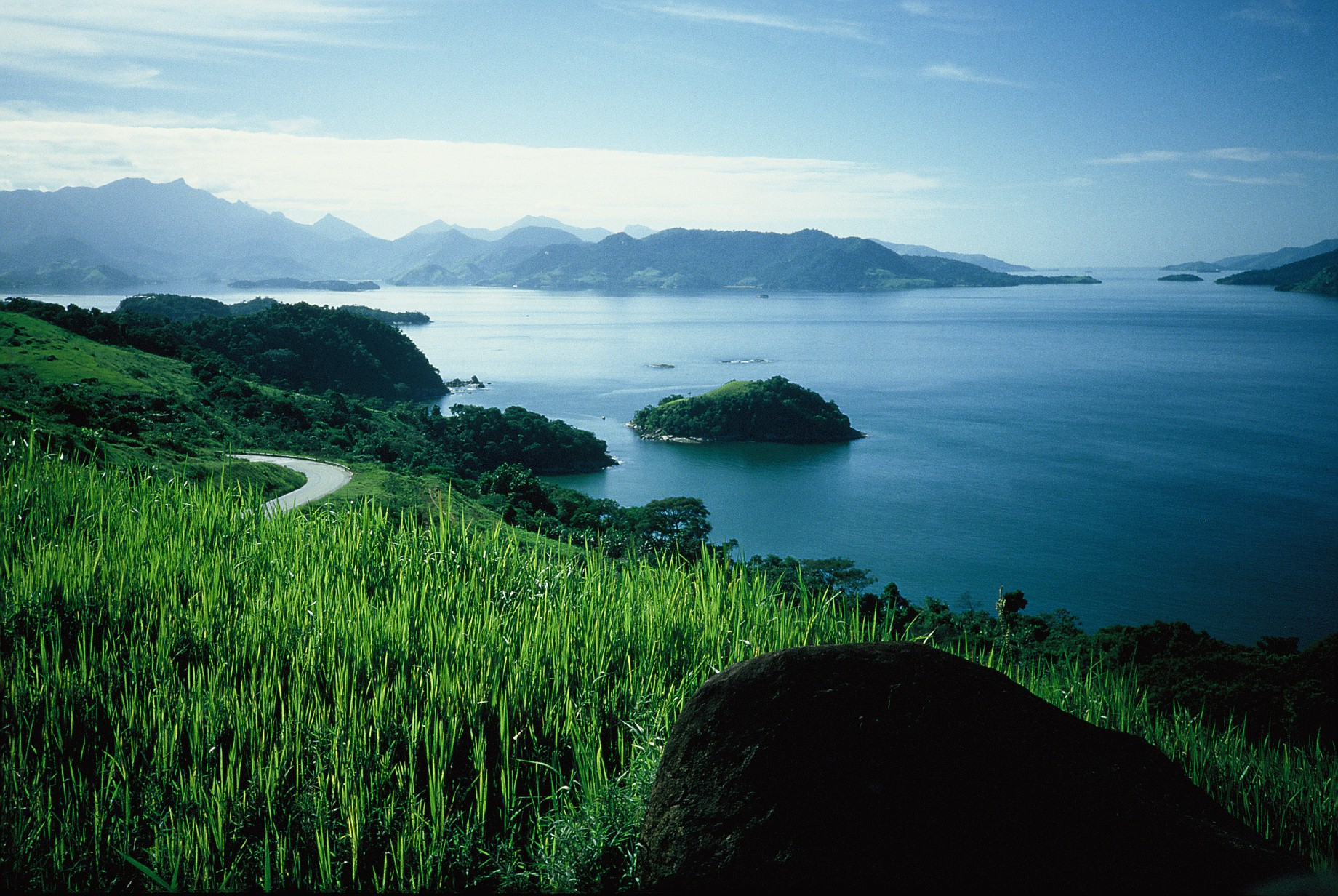
- View of Ilha Grande from the mainland

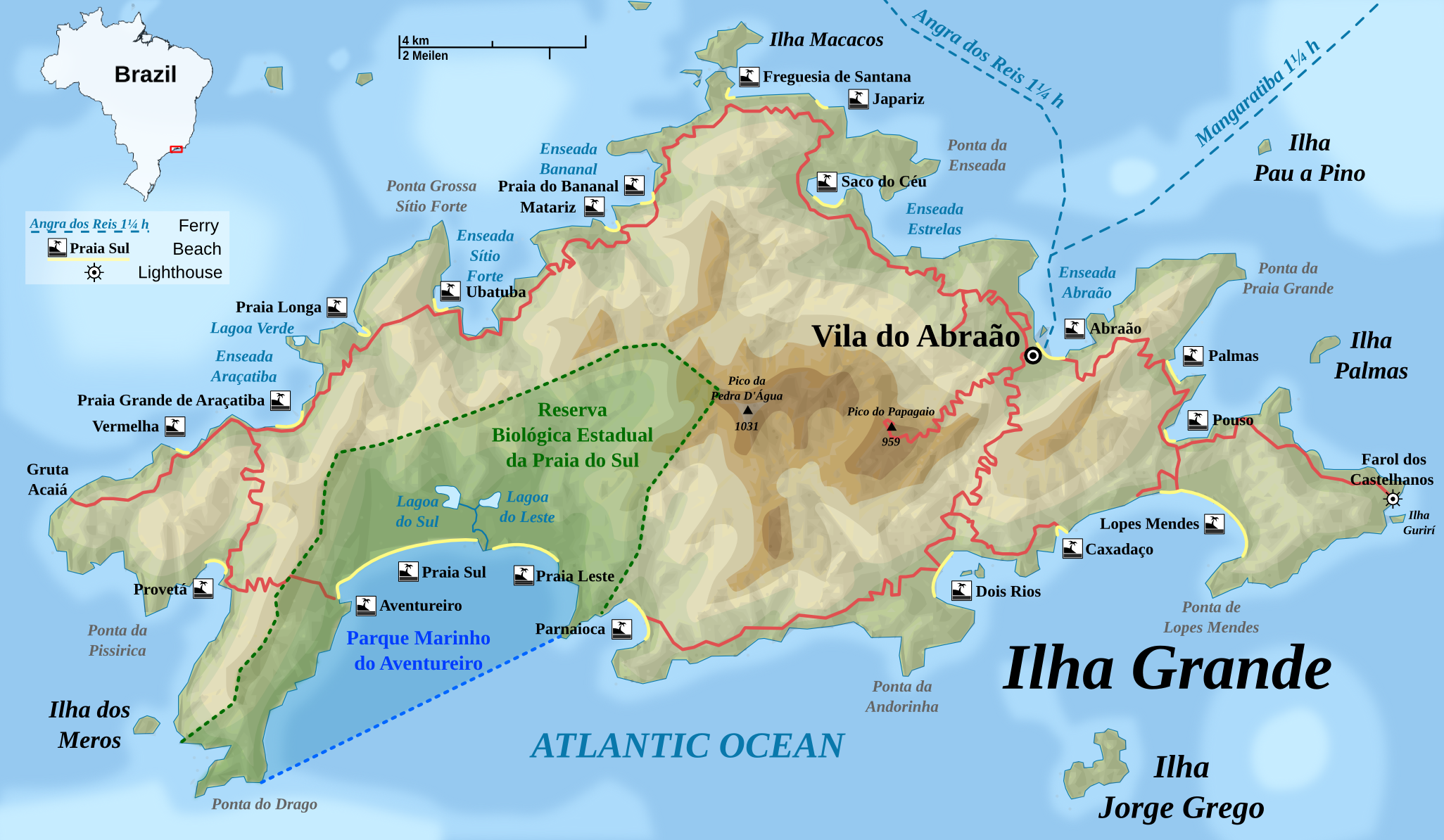
- English topographic map of Ilha Grande

- Location within Rio de Janeiro (state) Location within Brazil

Geography
- Location: Atlantic Ocean
- Coordinates: 23°09′S 44°14′W
- Area: 193 km^{2} (75 sq mi)
- Highest elevation: 1,031 m (3383 ft)
- Highest point: Pico da Pedra D'Água

Administration
- Brazil
- Municipality: Angra dos Reis
- State: Rio de Janeiro

Demographics
- Population: ~5000 (2014)

UNESCO World Heritage Site
- Official name: Paraty and Ilha Grande – Culture and Biodiversity
- Criteria: Cultural and Natural: (v), (x)
- Designated: 2019 (43rd session)
- Reference no.: 1308
- Region: Latin America and the Caribbean

Ilha Grande (Portuguese pronunciation: [ˈiʎɐ ˈɡɾɐ̃dʒi]), or "big island", is a 193 km^{2} (75 sq mi) forested island located around 12 km (7.5 mi) off the Atlantic coast of Angra dos Reis, Rio de Janeiro, Brazil, and about 243 km (151 mi) from São Paulo. The highest point on Ilha Grande is the 1,031 m (3,383 ft) tall Pico da Pedra D'Água.

== History ==
For almost a century, the Brazilian government declared the island off-limits, banning unauthorized entry, as it had contained an immigration quarantine station and, later, a maximum-security prison (Colônia Penal de Dois Rios, later known as Instituto Penal Cândido Mendes). The Cândido Mendes Penal Colony, which housed some of the most dangerous offenders in Brazil, was closed in 1994.

On 1 January 2010, devastating mudslides killed at least 19 people on the island.

On 5 July 2019, Ilha Grande and Paraty were inscribed as a UNESCO World Heritage Site.

== Environment ==
Ilha Grande and Paraty are contained within the 12,400 hectares (31,000 acres) of Tamoios Environmental Protection Area (APA), created in 1982. The main island (and APA) contains the Aventureiro Sustainable Development Reserve, created in 2014 from the former Aventureiro Marine State Park, which was integrated with the Praia do Sul Biological Reserve. 62.5% of the island is covered by the Ilha Grande State Park, giving a total of 87% of the island protected status.

=== Wildlife ===
Ilha Grande is one of the most pristine examples of Brazil's endangered Atlantic rainforest habitat, containing a multitude of species of plants and animals. A hotspot for biodiversity and conservation, Ilha Grande is home to at least 110 resident and migratory avian species, including Magellanic penguins and red-ruffed fruitcrows. The island has been designated an Important Bird Area (IBA) by BirdLife International because it supports significant populations of solitary tinamous, white-necked hawks, red-browed amazons, unicolored antwrens, cinnamon-vented pihas, bare-throated bellbirds, and azure-shouldered and black-backed tanagers.

There are at least 20 species of mammals, from capybara and coatimundi to primates, such as common and black-tufted marmosets and brown howler monkeys. Smaller animals, such as rodents and carnivores, include gray slender and big-eared opossums, Brazilian squirrel, crab-eating fox and raccoon, red-rumped agouti and the hairy dwarf porcupine. Several species of bat also inhabit caves on the island, mainly from the Artibeus, Molossus and Saccopteryx genera, emerging at sunset to feed on swarms of flying insects.

At least 40-50 species of reptiles and amphibians can be found on the island, including the Argentine black-and-white tegu, Brazilian torrent frog, Bocaina tree frog, broad-snouted caiman, chicken snakes, Chironius, Dipsas and Echinanthera snakes, garden tree boa, geckos, Imantodes snakes, Jackson's and Brazilian fathead anoles, lava lizards, mabuya, painted coralsnake, smallhead worm lizards and the venomous Yarará lancehead. Invertebrates and arthropods number in the hundreds, with at least 400-500 species identified on Ilha Grande.

The seas around the island, which are also a protected marine reserve, feature a unique convergence of tropical equatorial, subtropical and temperate currents, enabling one to see corals, tropical fish, sharks, hawksbill sea turtles and cetaceans, such as the southern right whale, humpback whale, Bryde's whale, orca and rough-toothed dolphins.

== Access ==
Most of the visitor facilities, lodging and the park headquarters are located at Vila do Abraão. The village may be reached from the mainland by local ferries. The island is an ecotourism destination. Although it has no roads and motorised vehicles are banned, the island has more than 150 km (93 mi) of hiking trails connecting the coastal villages and hamlets. A common activity for visitors is to trek to Lopes Mendes beach, about a two-hour hike from Vila do Abraão. Travel companies offer trips to see the island's various beaches, mountains trails and waterfalls.

A popular outdoor destination, the island remains largely undeveloped as much of the area falls within Ilha Grande State Park (Parque Estadual da Ilha Grande). Thus, the remainder of the island is subject to stringent development restrictions in order to preserve the natural environment; vehicles are not permitted and roads are virtually non-existent. For visitors there are several options for reaching and staying on the island. Several small villas and hamlets cater to researchers, tourists and nature-lovers, and around 2,000 people inhabit the largest town on the island, Vila do Abraão.

== Gallery ==
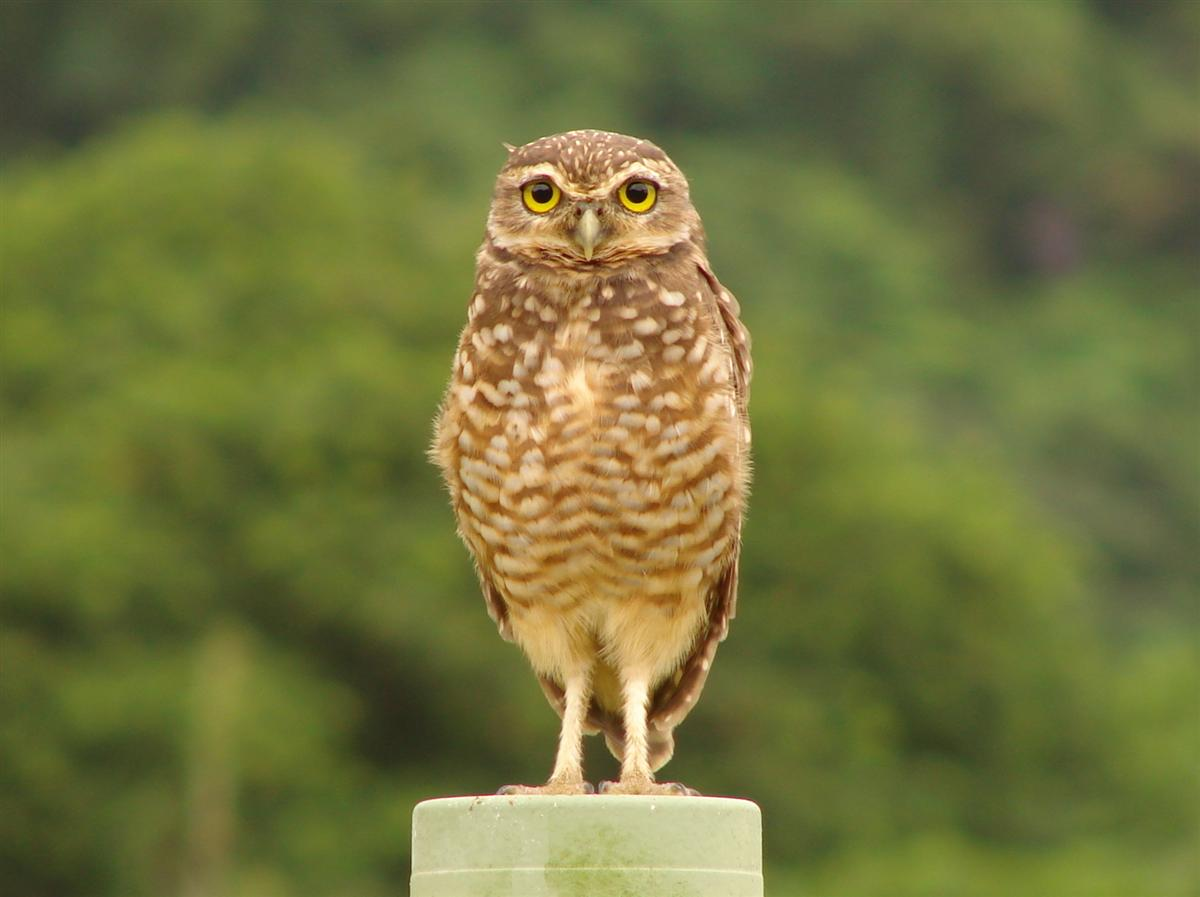
Burrowing owl on the island

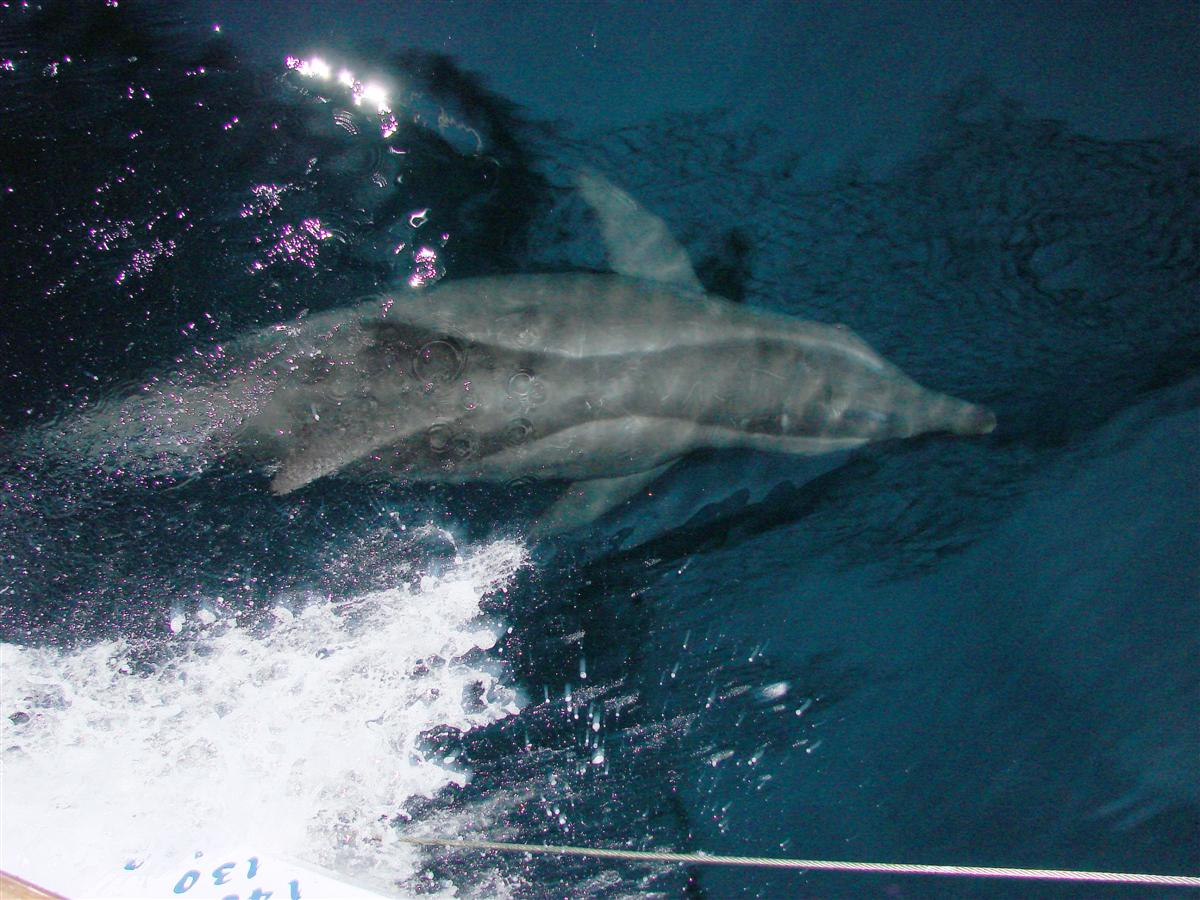
Atlantic bottlenose dolphin near the island

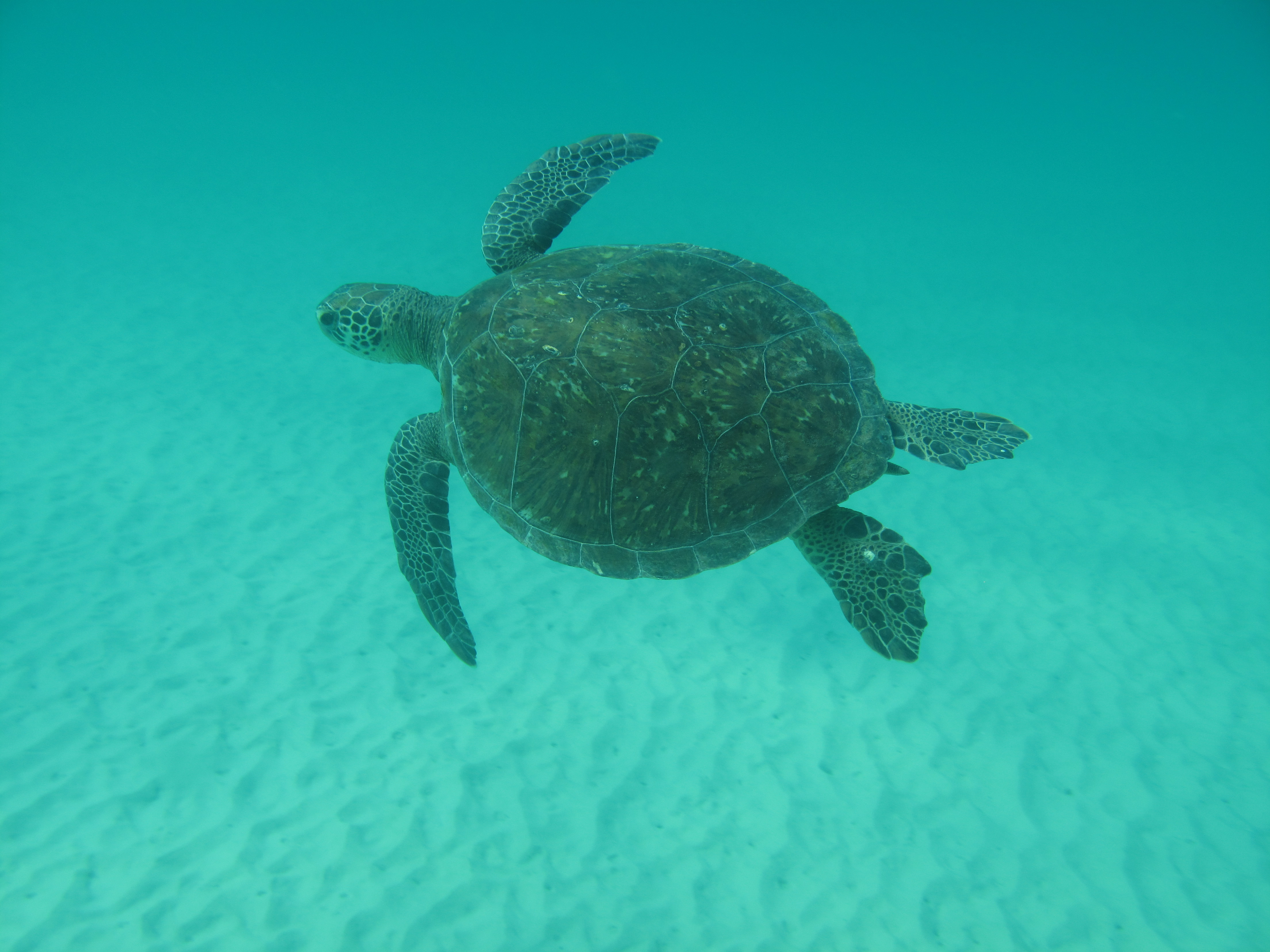
Green sea turtle off the coast of Ilha Grande
