= Massamá e Monte Abraão =

- Civil parish
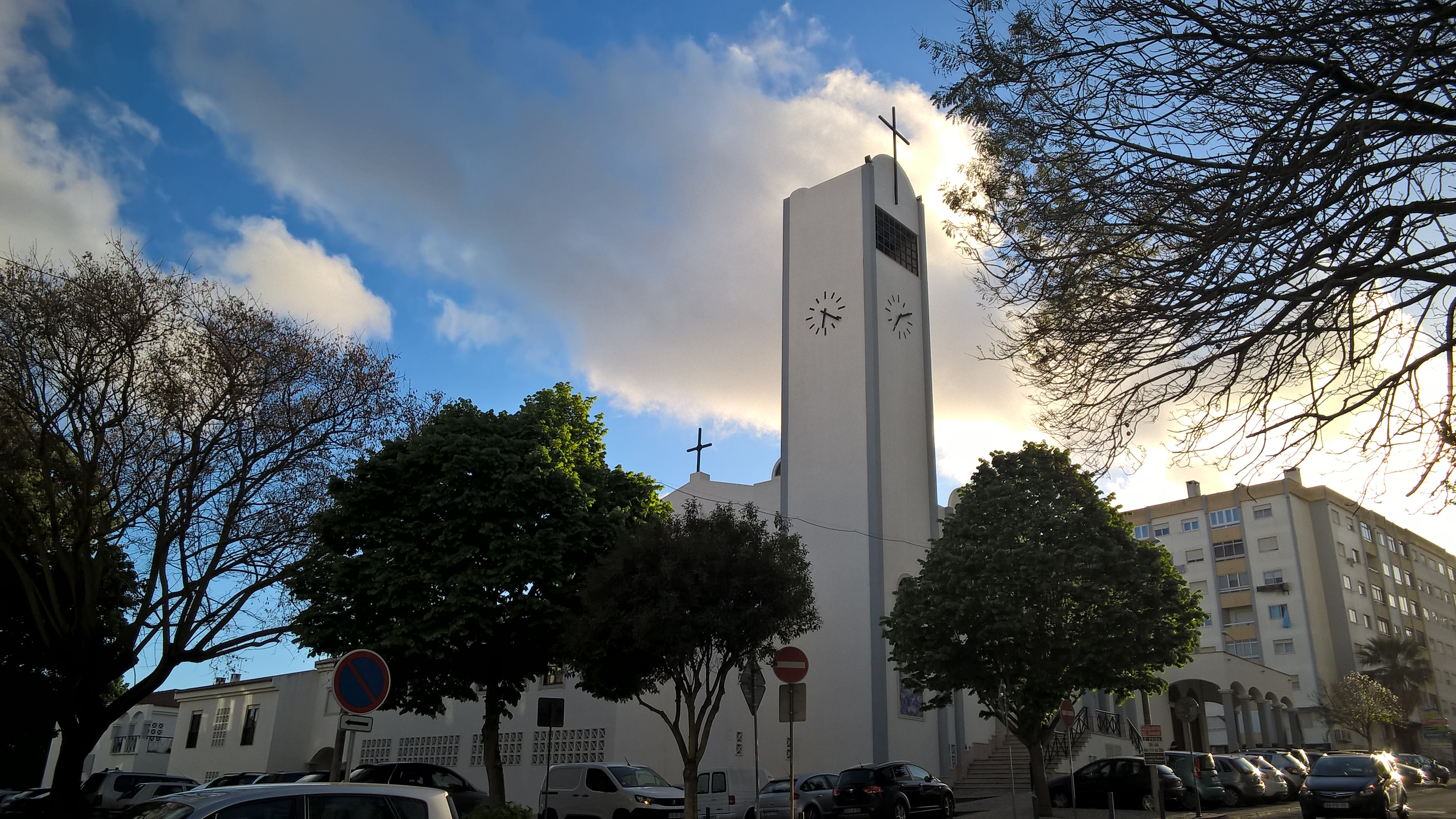

- Location in Portugal
- Coordinates: 38.757°N 9.275°W
- Country: Portugal
- Region: Lisbon
- Metropolitan area: Lisbon
- District: Lisbon
- Municipality: Sintra

Area
  - Total: 3.09 km^{2} (1.19 sq mi)

Population (2011)
  - Total: 48,921
  - Density: 15,800/km^{2} (41,000/sq mi)
- Time zone: UTC+00:00 (WET)
  - Summer (DST): UTC+01:00 (WEST)

Massamá e Monte Abraão is a civil parish in the municipality of Sintra, Lisbon District, Portugal. It was formed in 2013 by the merger of the former parishes Massamá and Monte Abraão. The population in 2011 was 48,921, in an area of 3.09 km^{2}.
