= Bocaina Mosaic =

Protected area mosaic in Brazil

- Mosaico Bocaina
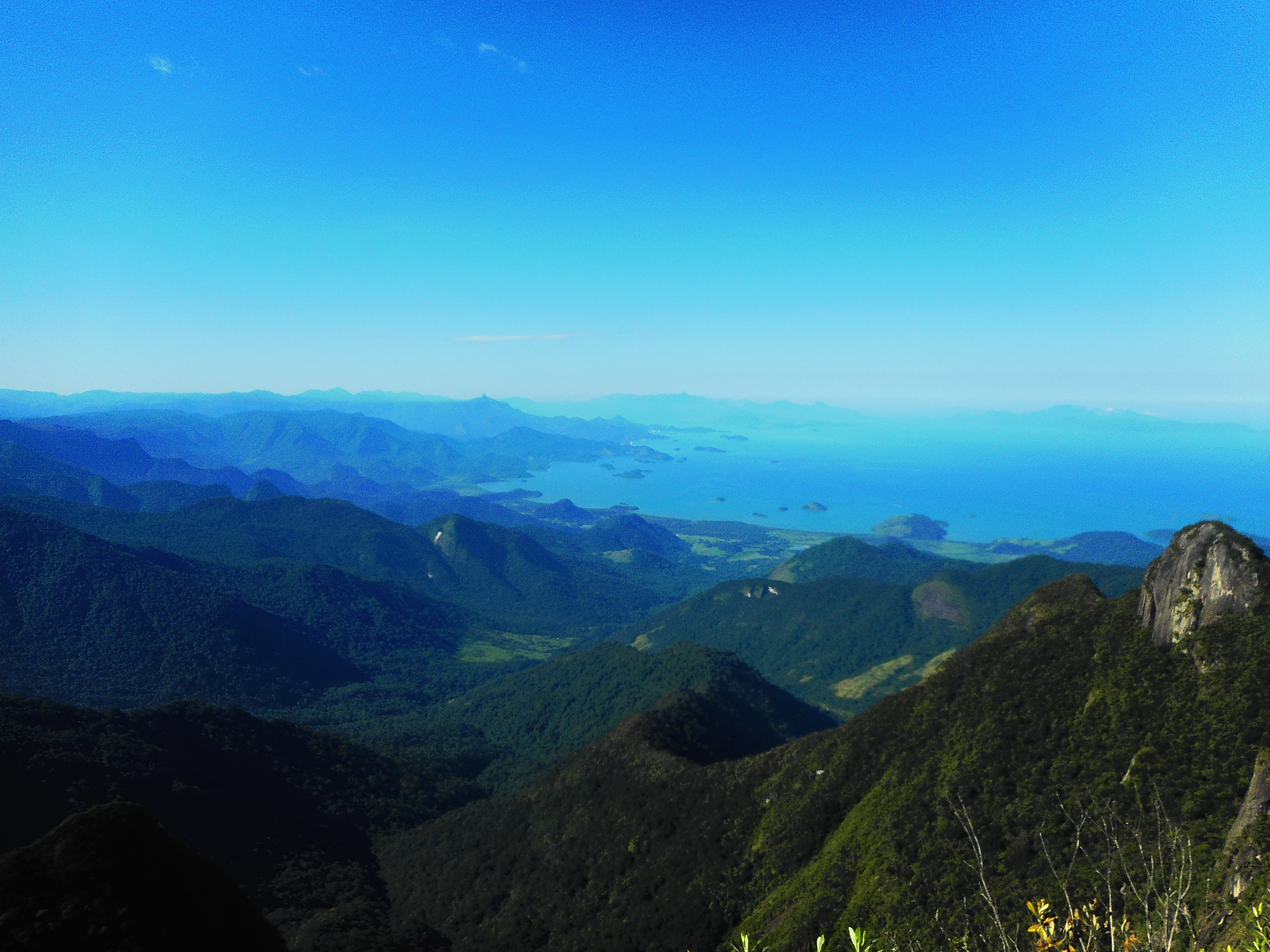
- View from the Pedra da Macela on the RJ/SP border

- Location within Brazil
- Nearest city: Paraty, Rio de Janeiro
- Coordinates: 23°17′13″S 44°44′20″W
- Area: 221,754 hectares (547,970 acres)
- Designation: Protected area mosaic
- Created: 11 December 2006

The Bocaina Mosaic (Portuguese: Mosaico Bocaina) is a protected area mosaic on the border between Rio de Janeiro and São Paulo, Brazil. It provides coordinated management for a group of 10 federal, state and municipal conservation units covering an area of Atlantic Forest along the coast and up the slopes of the Bocaina plateau.

== Creation ==
A project to create three new protected area mosaics in the Serra do Mar Ecological Corridor began in December 2005, coordinated by the National Council of the Atlantic Forest Biosphere Reserve. These were the Bocaina Mosaic, Central Rio de Janeiro Atlantic Forest Mosaic and Mantiqueira Mosaic. Funding was provided by Conservation International, the Fund for the Global Environment Facility (GEF), the Government of Japan, the MacArthur Foundation and the World Bank.

The Bocaina Mosaic was created by the ministry of the environment by decree 349 of 11 December 2006. The mosaic acquired its formal structure in March 2007. The purpose is to give integrated management of different conservation units in the region, including federal, state, municipal and private units, which may be different types of strictly protected or sustainable use unit.

== Extent and purpose ==
The Bocaina Mosaic has an area of 221,754 hectares (547,970 acres) and contains 10 conservation units and their buffer zones on the southern coast of Rio de Janeiro and the northern coast of São Paulo. It ranges from coastal areas through steep slopes to the top of the dissected Bocaina plateau at an altitude of 2,088 metres (6,850 ft). It is one of the main strongholds of Atlantic Forest vegetation, covered by dense rain forest (submontane, montane and high montane), high montane araucaria forest, alpine meadows, marine coastal and island ecosystems. The environment is still in good condition despite many places where humans have interfered.

The Bocaina Mosaic aims to encourage integrated management of the various protected areas, contributing to the preservation and conservation of natural and fishing resources as well as sustainable development of the territory. It is included in the Atlantic Forest Biosphere Reserve recognized by UNESCO. The mosaic has an advisory board with representation of government agencies and civil society to provide integrated management of the conservation units and their buffer zones.

== Conservation units ==
The conservation units include:

Name	Level	Created	State	Area (ha)
Aventureiro Sustainable Development Reserve (Note: Until 2014 the Aventureiro Sustainable Development Reserve was the Aventureiro Marine State Park.)	State	1990	Rio de Janeiro	1,300
Paraty Bay, Paraty-Mirim and Saco do Mamanguá Environmental Protection Area	Municipal	1984	Rio de Janeiro	3,070
Bananal Ecological Station	State	1987	Rio de Janeiro	884
Cairuçu Environmental Protection Area	Federal	1983	Rio de Janeiro	33,800
Ilha Anchieta State Park	State	1977	São Paulo	830
Praia do Sul Biological Reserve	State	1981	Rio de Janeiro	3,600
Serra da Bocaina National Park	Federal	1972	Rio de Janeiro; São Paulo	97,953
Serra do Mar State Park (includes the Cunha and Santa Virgínia nuclei)	State	1977	São Paulo	47,500
Tamoios Ecological Station	Federal	1990	Rio de Janeiro	8,700
Tamoios Environmental Protection Area	State	1986	Rio de Janeiro	90,000

== Sources ==
- "Corredor ecológico da Serra do Mar", Acervo da Folha do Meio (in Portuguese), FMA: Folha do Meio Ambiente, 20 December 2006, archived from the original on 23 September 2016
- Lino, Clayton Ferreira; Albuquerque, João Lucílio; Dias, Heloisa (2007), Mosaicos de unidades de conservação no Corredor da Serra do Mar (PDF) (in Portuguese), São Paulo: Conselho Nacional da Reserva da Biosfera da Mata Atlântica
- Mosaico de Unidades de Conservação da Bocaina - SP e RJ (PDF) (in Portuguese), RBMA, archived from the original (PDF) on 2016-10-11
- "Reserva de Desenvolvimento Sustentável do Aventureiro - Ilha Grande - Angra dos", ilhagrande.org (in Portuguese)
