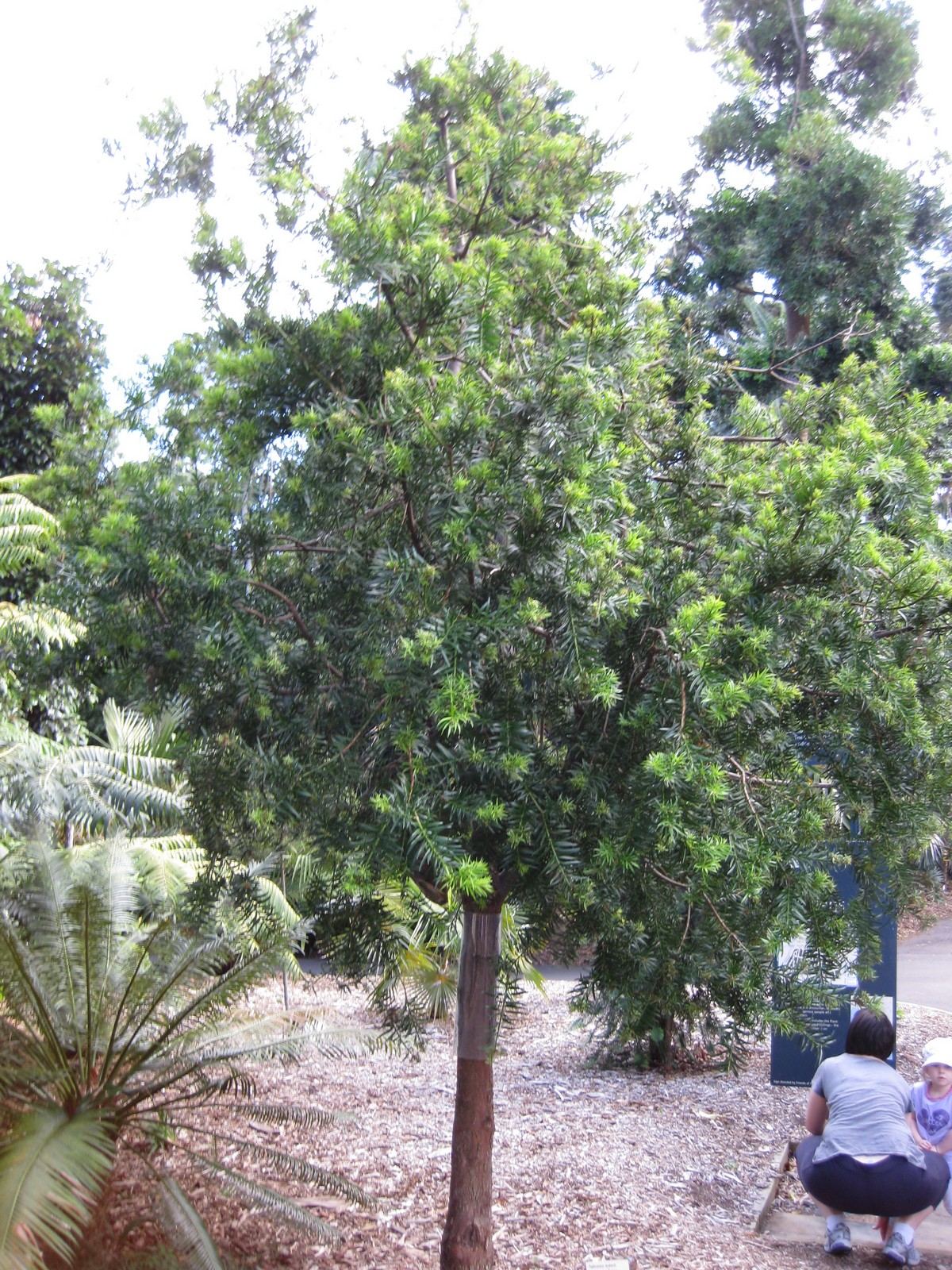

Conservation status
- Near Threatened (IUCN 3.1)

Scientific classification
- Kingdom: Plantae
- Clade: Tracheophytes
- Clade: Gymnosperms
- Division: Pinophyta
- Class: Pinopsida
- Order: Araucariales
- Family: Podocarpaceae
- Genus: Podocarpus
- Species: P. lambertii

Binomial name
- Podocarpus lambertii Klotzsch ex Endl.

Synonyms
- Nageia lambertii (Klotzsch ex Endl.) F.Muell.; Podocarpus lambertii subsp. horsmanii (Silba) Silba; Podocarpus lambertii var. horsmanii Silba; Podocarpus lambertii subsp. tigreensis (Silba) Silba; Podocarpus lambertii var. tigreensis Silba

= Podocarpus lambertii =

Species of conifer

Podocarpus lambertii is a species of conifer in the family Podocarpaceae. It is a tree native to southeastern and southern Brazil and Misiones Province of northeastern Argentina.
