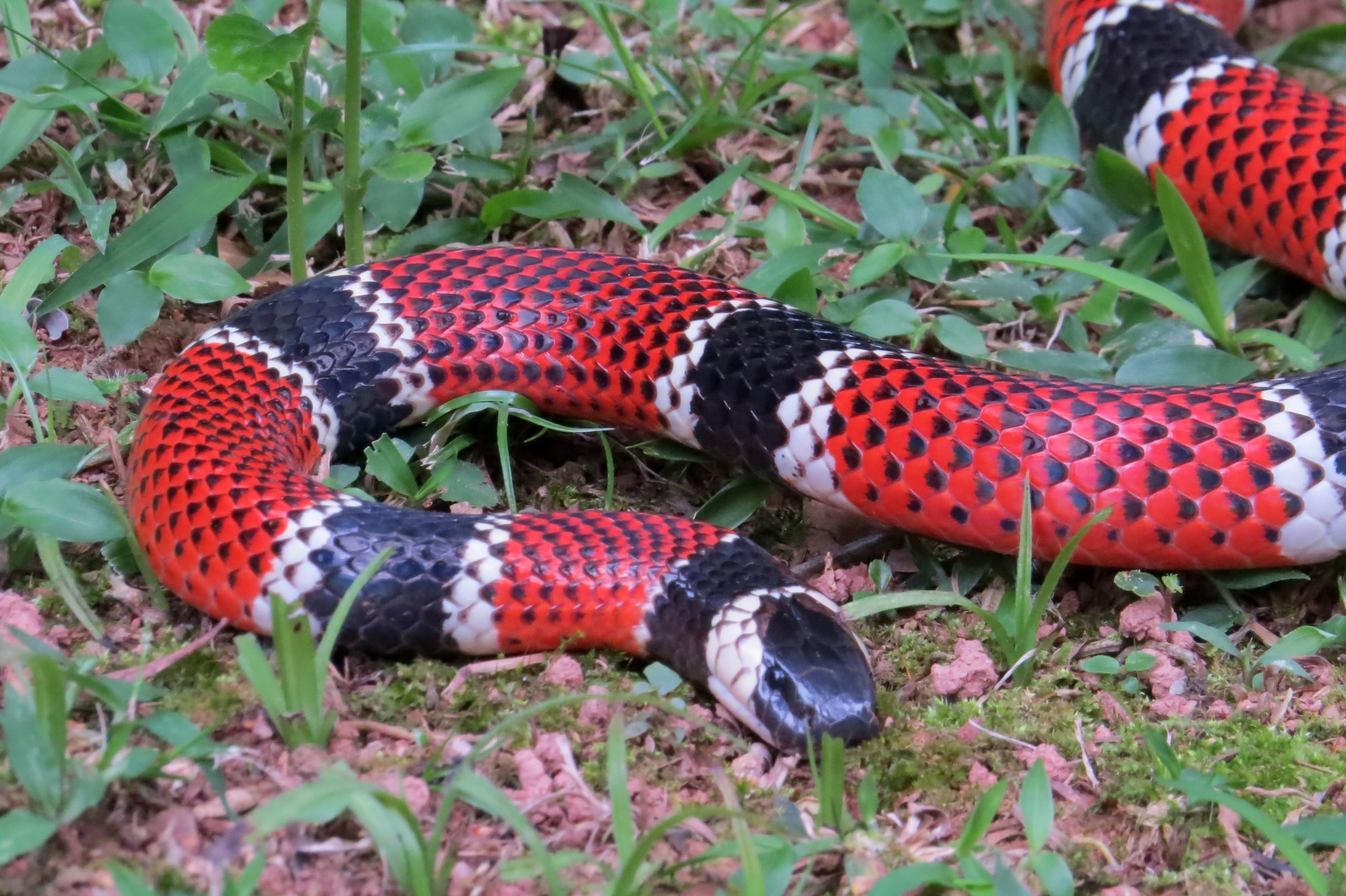

Conservation status
- Least Concern (IUCN 3.1)

Scientific classification
- Kingdom: Animalia
- Phylum: Chordata
- Class: Reptilia
- Order: Squamata
- Suborder: Serpentes
- Family: Elapidae
- Genus: Micrurus
- Species: M. corallinus

Binomial name
- Micrurus corallinus (Merrem, 1820)
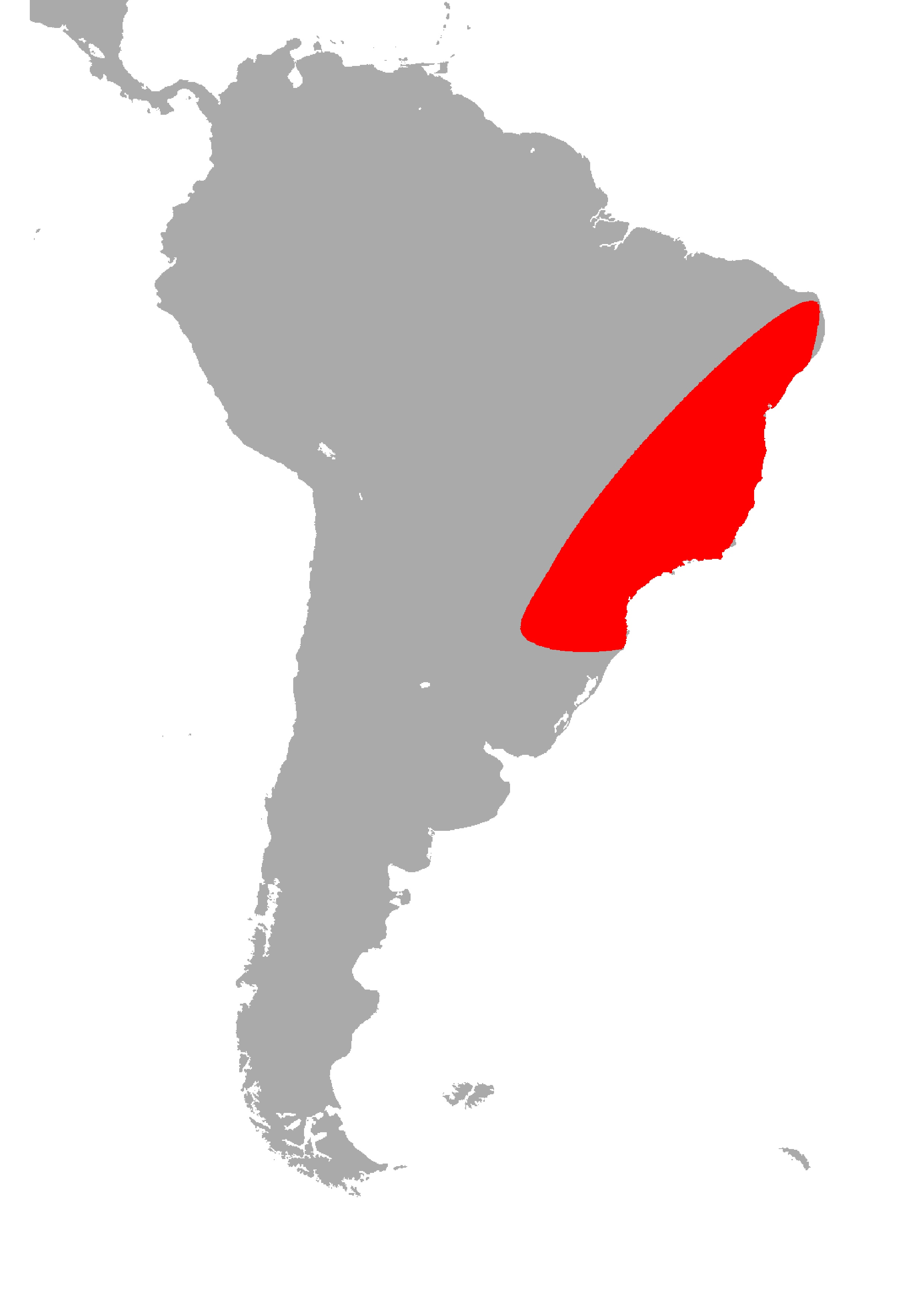

Synonyms
- Elaps corallinus Merrem, 1820

= Micrurus corallinus =

Species of snake

Micrurus corallinus, also known commonly as the painted coral snake, is a species of highly venomous snake in the family Elapidae. The species is native to eastern South America (Argentina, Brazil, and Paraguay). There are no recognized subspecies.

== Common names ==
Local common names for Micrurus corallinus include cobra coral pintada, mboi-chumbe, vibora de coral, boicora, bocora, coral-verdadeira, ibiboboca, and mboi-yvyvovo.

== Description and behavior ==
The painted coral snake is a medium-sized tri-colored snake which can grow to a total length (tail included) of 98 cm (39 in), but most are closer to 65–85 cm (26–33 in).

It is a snake with nocturnal habits found on the coastlines, in leaf litter, and under logs and stones. Its diet is based on caecilians, amphisbaenids, lizards (including gymnophthalmids), other snakes (including colubrids).

The head color is black with a white or yellow band on the posterior portion of the parietals. This band narrows strongly mid-dorsally. The body has wide red rings that are separated by a series of 15–27 (usually 17–21) narrower black rings with white borders. The tail has 3–8 alternating black and yellow rings. It has a slim body, with a moderately short tail in males, and a very short tail in females. The head is round, small, and little distinct from the neck. The eyes are slightly small, with round pupils. It has smooth and shiny dorsal scales, without apical pits. The supra-anal keels are absent in males.

== Geographic distribution and habitat ==
In South America Micrurus corallinus is found in Brazil (Rio Grande do Sul, Rio Grande do Norte, Bahia, Santa Catarina, Espírito Santo), northeastern Argentina (Misiones), and Paraguay. It is mainly found in the Amazon basin in tropical deciduous and evergreen forest at elevations ranging from sea level to 500 m (1,600 ft).

== Reproduction ==
Micrurus corallinus is oviparous, with adult females laying up to 15 eggs.

== Venom ==
Micrurus corallinus is not aggressive towards humans. The group of coral snakes represents only 1% of accidents in Central and South America, however the venom produced by them is highly potent, with neurotoxic action, causing neuromuscular block, which results in death from respiratory arrest, resulting from paralysis of the respiratory muscles. The LD_{50} for a 5–27 grams mouse is 0.007 mg. 0.2 mg/kg (intramuscular injection), 0.09 mg/kg (intraperitoneal) and 0.04 mg/kg (intravenous).

The venom of this species is a compound of the three-finger toxin families, Phospholipase A2, L-amino acid oxidase, True venom lectin, SVMP (snake venom metalloproteinase), Kunitz-type inhibitor (Venom Kunitz-type), NGF (NGF -beta) and Waprin. The amount of venom extracted from this species is 3 mg. The venom of this species has presynaptic activity. M. corallinus has alpha-neurotoxins with pre-synaptic activity that causes a high and spontaneous release of acetylcholine associated with the postsynaptic block of the electrical transmission between the nerve and the muscle.

When live specimens of M. corallinus were "milked" in a laboratory, the average venom yield was 10–12 mg, which is approximately twice the estimated lethal dose of 6–8 mg for an adult human. The maximum venom yield was 65 mg, which is enough to kill 5-6 people.
