= Angra dos Reis =

Municipality in Rio de Janeiro state, Brazil

- Municipality
- Municipality of Angra dos Reis
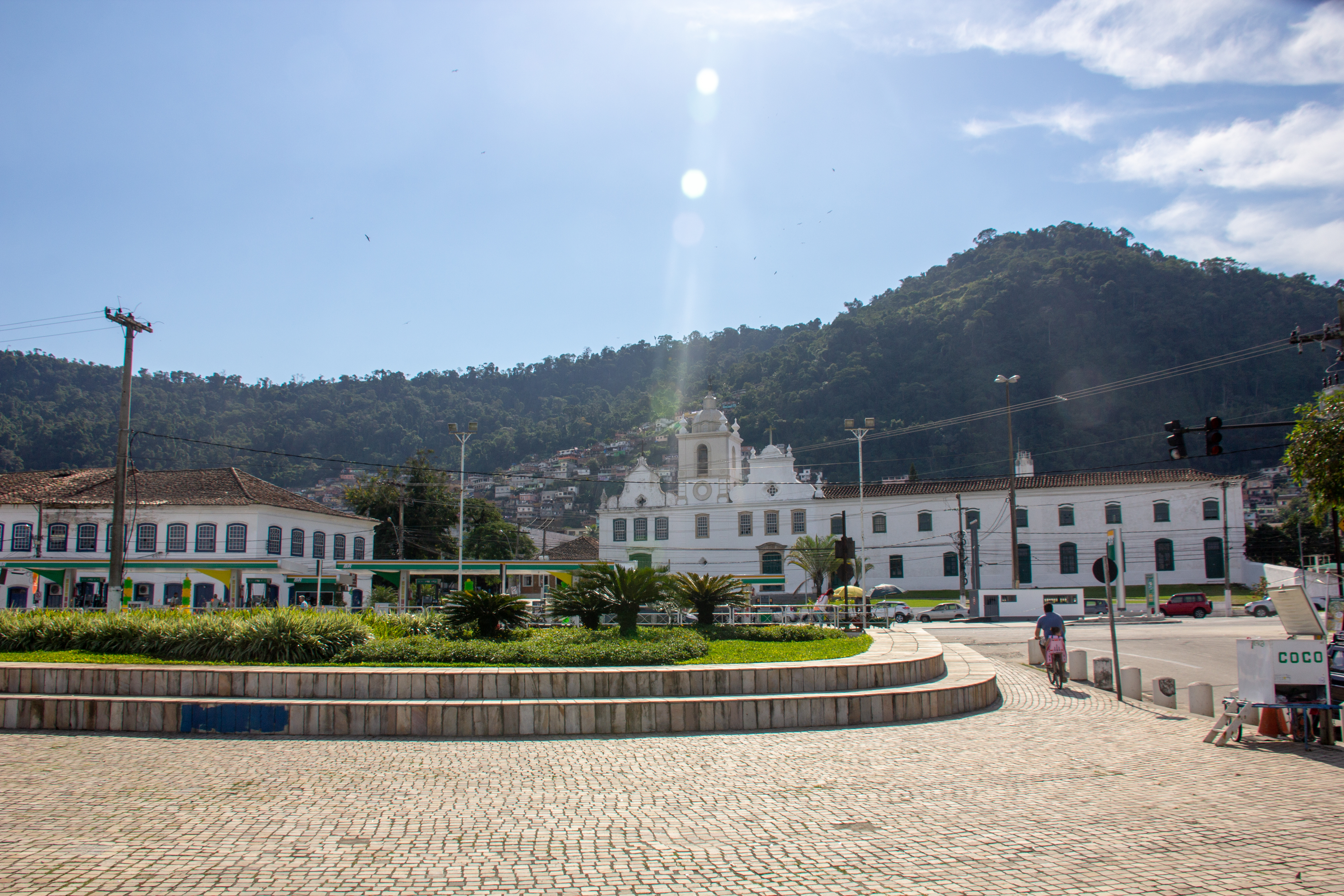
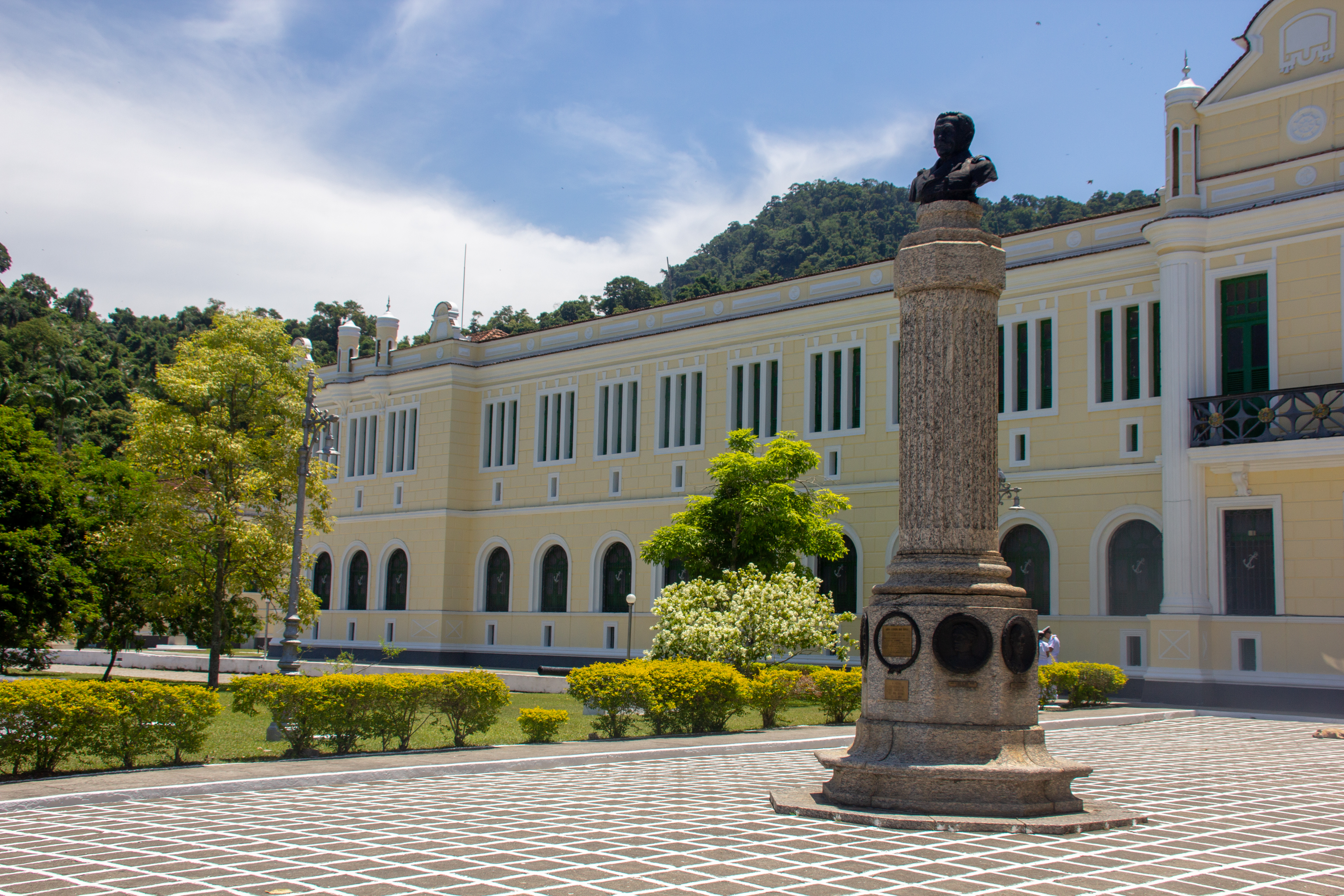
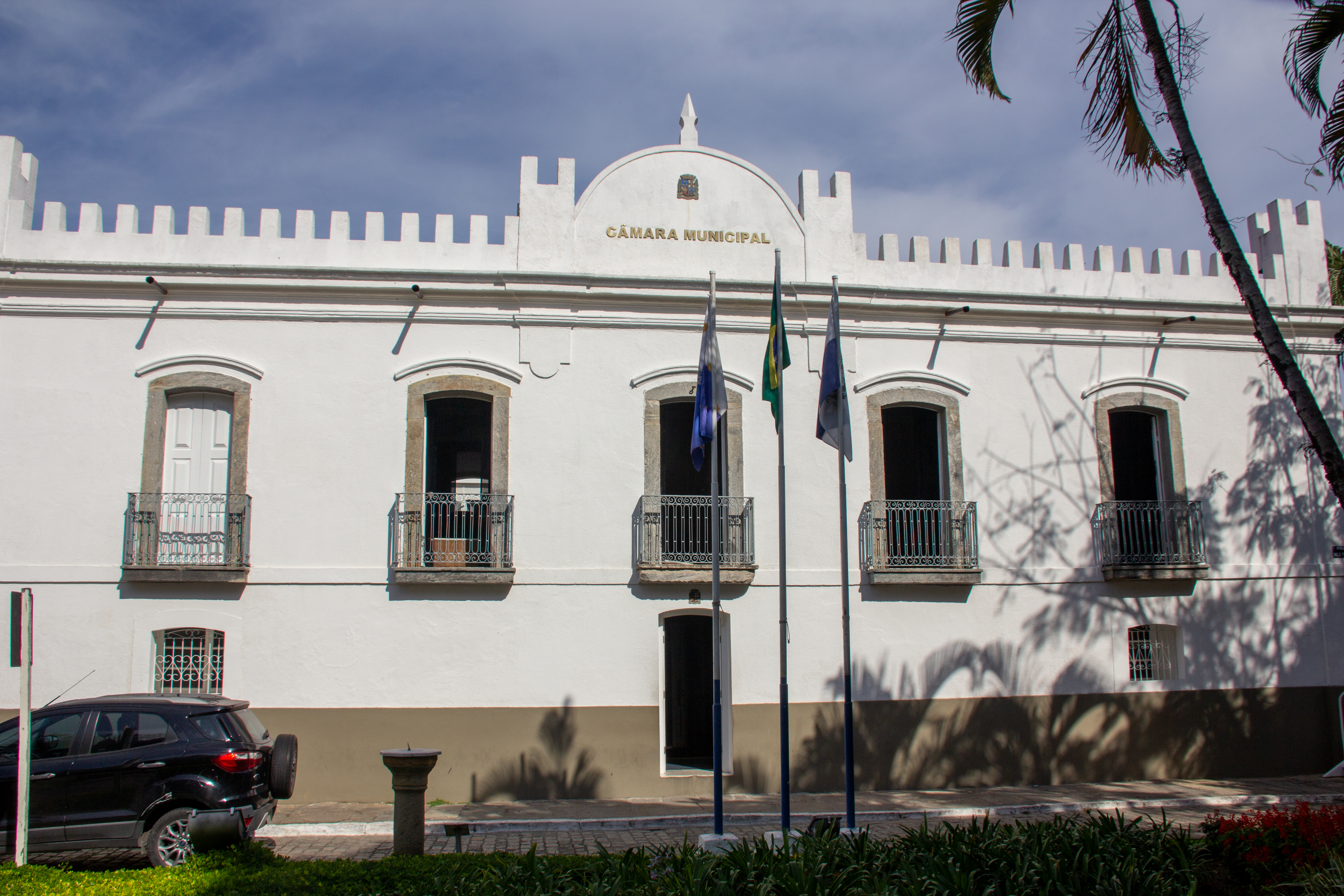
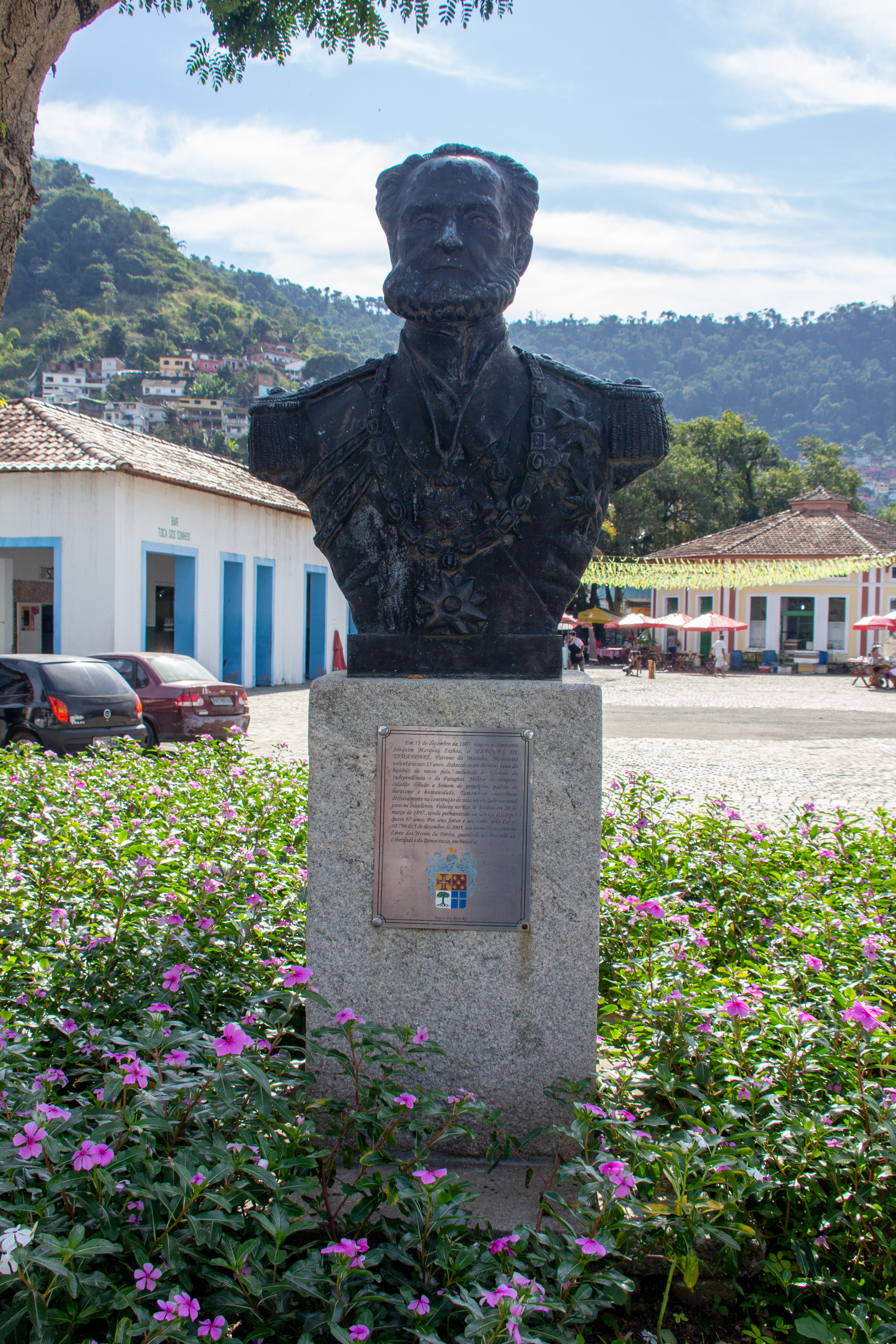
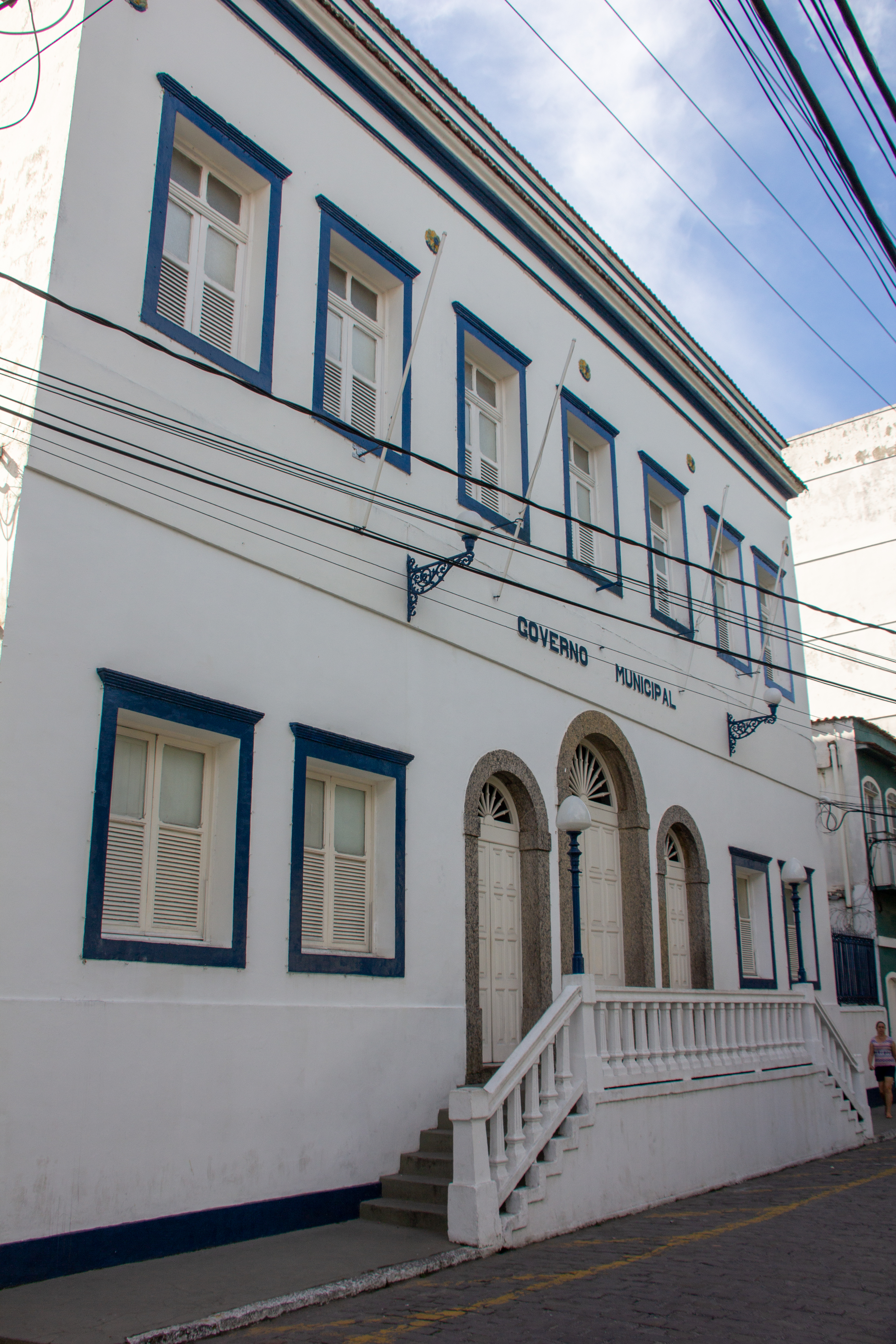
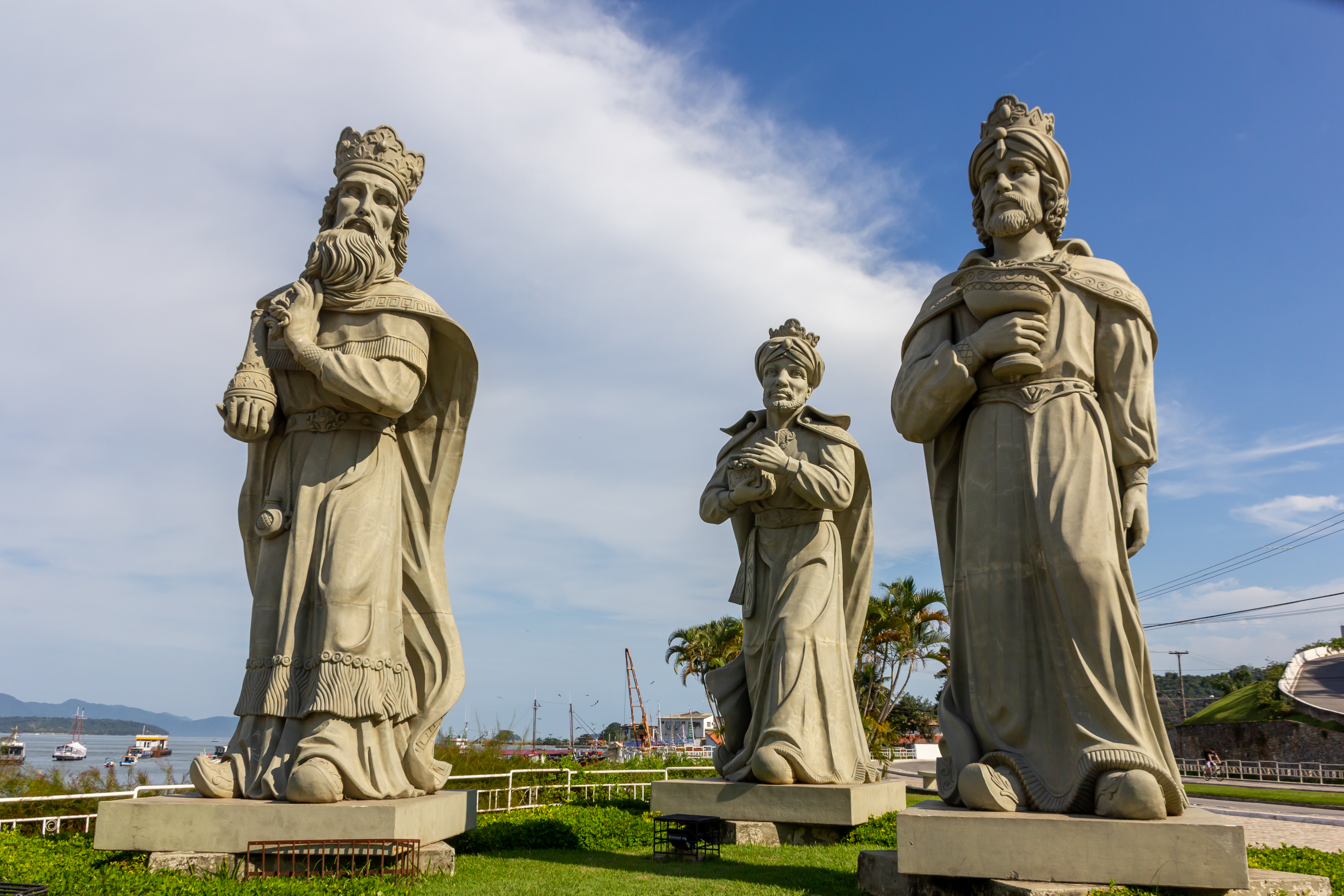
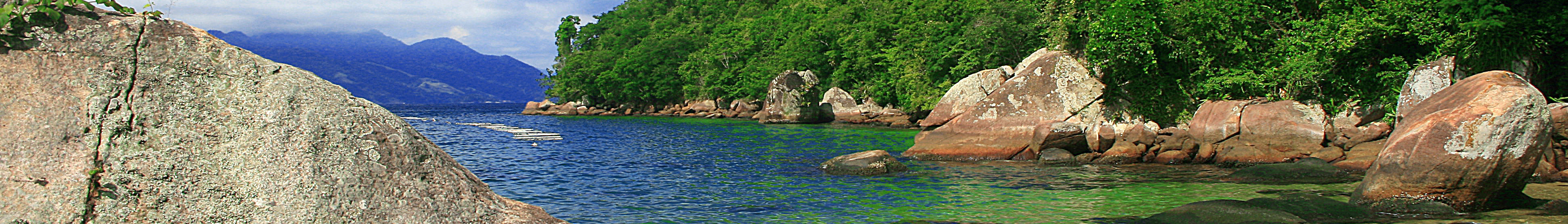

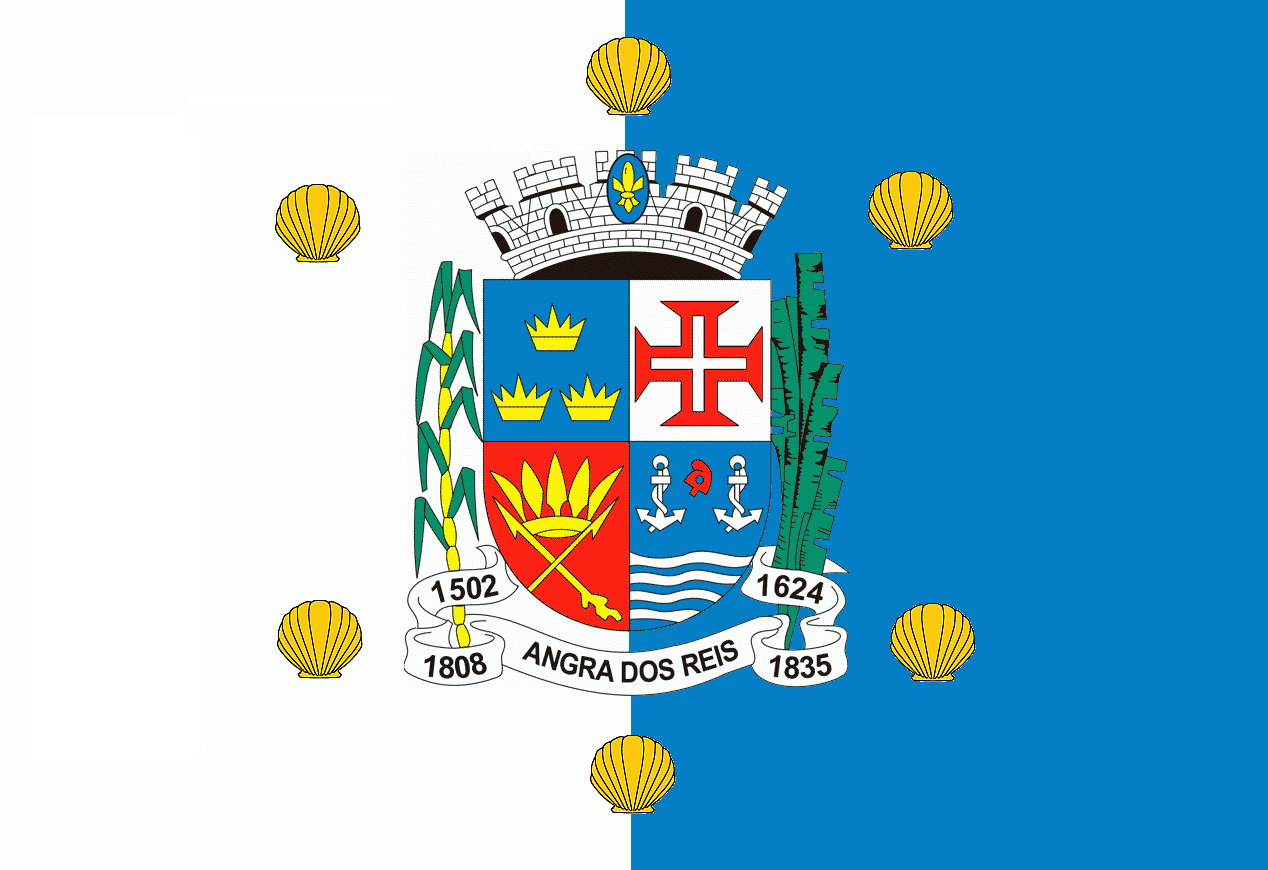
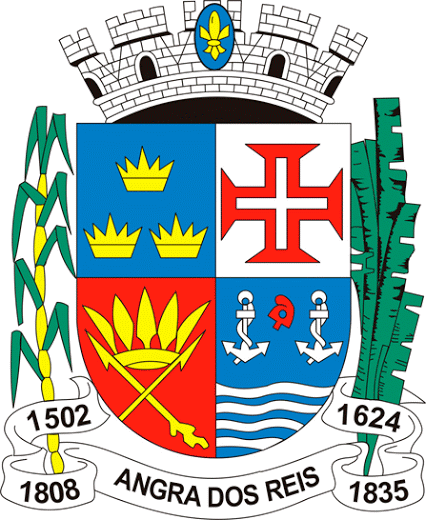
- Flag Coat of arms
- Nickname: Angra
- Location in Rio de Janeiro
- Coordinates: 23°00′24″S 44°19′05″W
- Country: Brazil
- Region: Southeast
- State: Rio de Janeiro
- Founded: 6 January 1502

Government
  - Mayor: Fernando Jordão (MDB)

Area
  - Total: 816.3 km^{2} (315.2 sq mi)
- Elevation: 5.78 m (19.0 ft)

Population (2022 Brazilian Census)
  - Total: 167,434
  - Estimate (2025): 179,142
  - Density: 205.1/km^{2} (531.2/sq mi)
- Demonym: angrense
- Time zone: UTC−3 (BRT)
- HDI (2010): 0.724 – high
- Website: angra.rj.gov.br

Angra dos Reis (Portuguese pronunciation: [ˈɐ̃ɡɾɐ duʒ ˈʁejʃ]; Portuguese for cove or bay of the Kings) is a municipality located in the southern part of the Brazilian state of Rio de Janeiro. The city is located by the sea and includes in its territory many offshore islands, the largest being Ilha Grande.

The area was first documented by Europeans on January 6, 1502, and has been under continual settlement since 1556. Its population was in the 2022 Census 167,434 inhabitants.

== History ==
The port municipality fell into decline after 1872, having been bypassed by the advent of railways. It came back into prominence in the 1920s, when a railway extension connected it to the states of Minas Gerais and Goias, as a terminus for the transportation of agriculture production from these same two states. The railway extension, in metre gauge, still exists and is currently operated by the Ferrovia Centro-Atlântica company.

In the mid-twentieth century, the municipality was an essential part of the implementation of Companhia Siderúrgica Nacional – CSN, Volta Redonda, and the endpoint for coking coal supplied from Santa Catarina. Today, the same company also uses the port for some of its steel exports.

Its current importance is due, in part, to having a ferry terminal facility in the Bay of Ilha Grande and its harbour, used by TEBIG Petrobras, which transports large quantities of crude oil, and thus positions the port of Angra dos Reis as one of the busiest in the country.

Today, because of its beaches and nearby points of interest, the place has become a focal point for tourism. Within the municipality are over three hundred islands, many of them owned by celebrities, with the largest island being Ilha Grande (Big Island). The Brazilian plastic surgeon and philanthropist Ivo Pitanguy was a noted resident.

Most of the region consists of hilly terrain, which helped generate the landslides that occurred at the beginning of 2010, when numerous homes and hotels were severely damaged or destroyed, mainly on Ilha Grande.

== Economy ==
The most important economic activities are commerce, fishing, industry, services, and tourism. The port has an oil terminal as well as shipbuilding (Keppel Fels, former Verolme) facilities. Brazil's nuclear power stations, Angra I and Angra II are located nearby. They employ 3,000 people, and generate another 10,000 indirect jobs in Rio de Janeiro State. Tourism is highly developed, with beaches, islands and clean waters for swimming or scuba diving. The nuclear power stations also warm the area's waters with their thermal discharges, a form of thermal pollution.

There is a small amount of cattle raising, with approximately 4,200 head. The main agricultural products cultivated are:

- bananas: 1,460 hectares / 3,600 tons
- coconut: 10 hectares / 130,000 units
- oranges: 4 hectares / 25 tons
- hearts of palm (palmito): 50 hectares / 75 tons
- sugarcane: 20 hectares / 390 tons

Data are from IBGE

== Etymology ==
Gaspar de Lemos, a navigator and commander of the Portuguese naval fleet landed at Ilha Grande on 6 January 1502, a “Kings’ day” – that is, “Dia de Reis”. Accordingly, the place was named “Angra dos Reis”, which means “Creek of the Kings” or loosely – “Anchorage of the Kings”.

== Transportation ==
The city is served by Angra dos Reis Airport. It is on the Rio-Santos Highway. There are once-daily ferries between Ilha Grande and mainland Angra dos Reis, and between Ilha Grande and Mangaratiba. Angra dos Reis has a bus station approximately 2.5 km (1.6 mi) from the city center, with coach buses to São Paulo, Rio de Janeiro, Belo Horizonte, Campo Grande, Juiz de Fora and São José dos Campos, among other cities. The city also has also 28 urban bus lines that do not cross city limits.

== Geography ==
=== Location ===
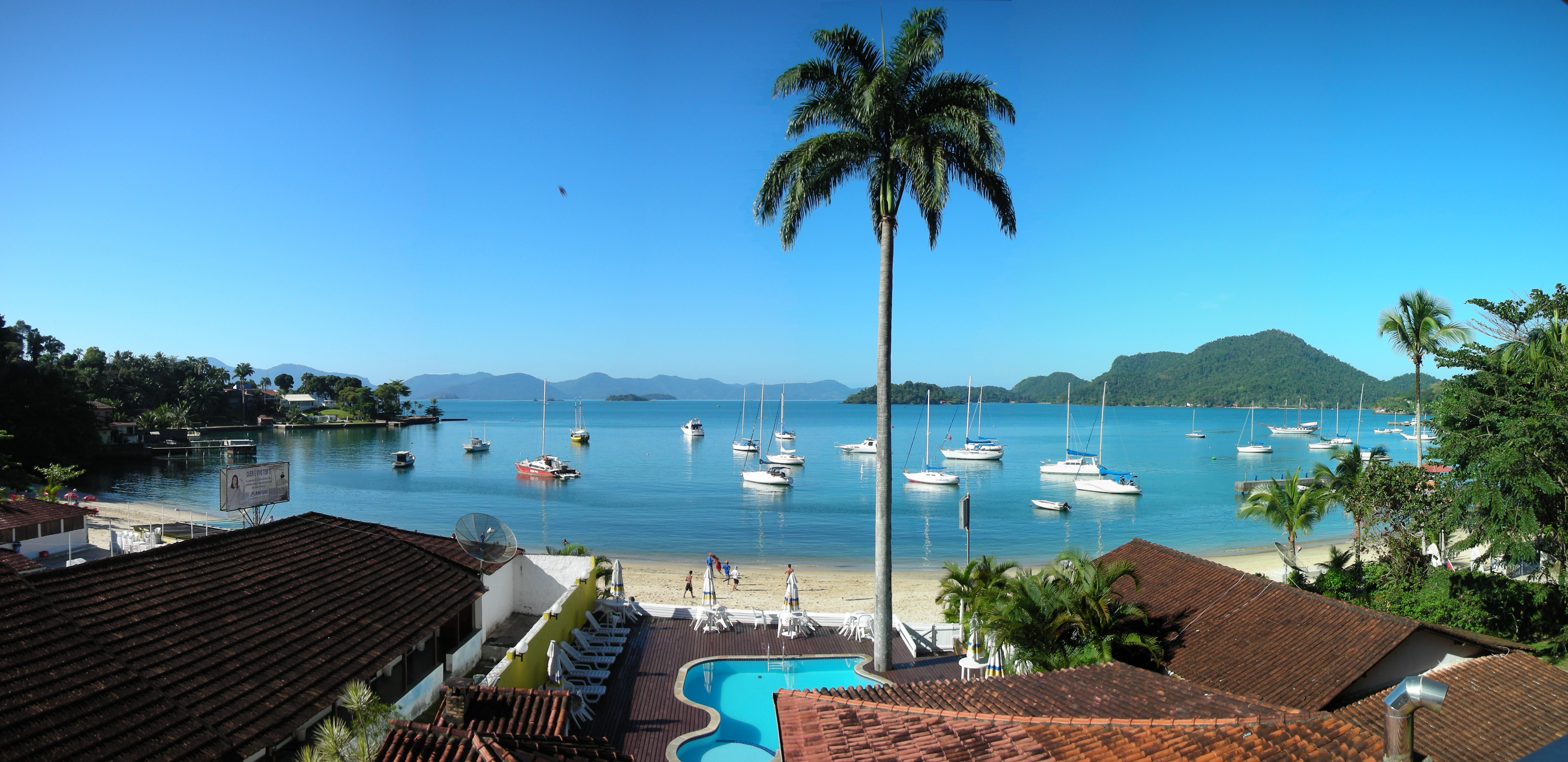
Angra dos Reis Bay view

Angra dos Reis has an area of 816.3 km^{2}. The neighboring municipalities are Paraty, Rio Claro and Mangaratiba in Rio de Janeiro state, and Bananal and São José do Barreiro, which are adjacent in São Paulo state.

The municipality contains the 12,072-hectare (29,830-acre) Ilha Grande State Park, created in 1971 on the Ilha Grande off the southern coast. It contains the 3,502-hectare (8,650-acre) Praia do Sul Biological Reserve, a strictly protected conservation unit created in 1981 on the Ilha Grande. It contains the 1,312-hectare (3,240-acre) Aventureiro Sustainable Development Reserve, formerly the Aventureiro Marine State Park, also on Ilha Grande. The municipality also contains part of the Tamoios Ecological Station. The conservation units are contained within the 12,400-hectare (31,000-acre) Tamoios Environmental Protection Area, created in 1982.

=== Climate ===
According to Köppen climate classification, Angra dos Reis has a tropical monsoon climate (Am).

Climate data for Angra dos Reis (1981–2010)
Month	Jan	Feb	Mar	Apr	May	Jun	Jul	Aug	Sep	Oct	Nov	Dec	Year
Mean daily maximum °C (°F)	29.8 (85.6)	30.1 (86.2)	29.0 (84.2)	28.2 (82.8)	25.7 (78.3)	24.7 (76.5)	24.0 (75.2)	24.3 (75.7)	24.5 (76.1)	25.4 (77.7)	26.9 (80.4)	28.3 (82.9)	26.7 (80.1)
Mean daily minimum °C (°F)	23.3 (73.9)	23.0 (73.4)	22.5 (72.5)	21.4 (70.5)	19.0 (66.2)	17.7 (63.9)	16.6 (61.9)	17.3 (63.1)	18.3 (64.9)	19.4 (66.9)	20.7 (69.3)	22.0 (71.6)	20.1 (68.2)
Average precipitation mm (inches)	235.6 (9.28)	188.5 (7.42)	206.0 (8.11)	166.9 (6.57)	114.0 (4.49)	71.5 (2.81)	90.1 (3.55)	54.0 (2.13)	120.9 (4.76)	141.6 (5.57)	148.9 (5.86)	258 (10.2)	1,796 (70.7)
Average precipitation days (≥ 1.0 mm)	14	11	12	10	9	7	8	7	12	13	12	15	130
Source: Instituto Nacional de Meteorologia
