= Sobral =

Sobral may refer to:

== People ==
- Sobral (surname)
- Marcos Sobral (born 1960), Brazilian botanist whose standard author abbreviation is Sobral

== Places ==
- Sobral Base, a defunct research station in Antarctica
- Sobral, Ceará, a municipality in the State of Ceará, Brazil
- Sobral de Monte Agraço Municipality, Portugal
- Sobral de Monte Agraço (parish), a civil parish in the Portuguese municipality
- Sobral Pichorro e Fuinhas, a civil parish in the municipality of Fornos de Algodres, Portugal

== Other uses ==
- Sobral Fault, a geological formation in South America
- Sobral Formation, a geological formation in Antarctica
- Sobral Unit, a geological formation in Europe

== See also ==
- Sobrado (disambiguation)
- Sobreira (disambiguation)
- Sobreiro (disambiguation)
- Sobro
- Sobroso
