= Sobreira =

Sobreira is the Portuguese and Galician name for the cork oak tree (Quercus suber), and may refer to:

== People ==
- Rafael Sobreira da Costa, Brazilian footballer

== Places ==
- Sobreira (Paredes), a parish in Paredes Municipality, Portugal

== See also ==
- Sobreiro (disambiguation)
- Sobral (disambiguation)
- Sobrado (disambiguation)
