= Paraty-Mirim State Park =

State park in Rio de Janeiro, Brazil

- Parque Estadual De Paraty-Mirim
- IUCN category II (national park)
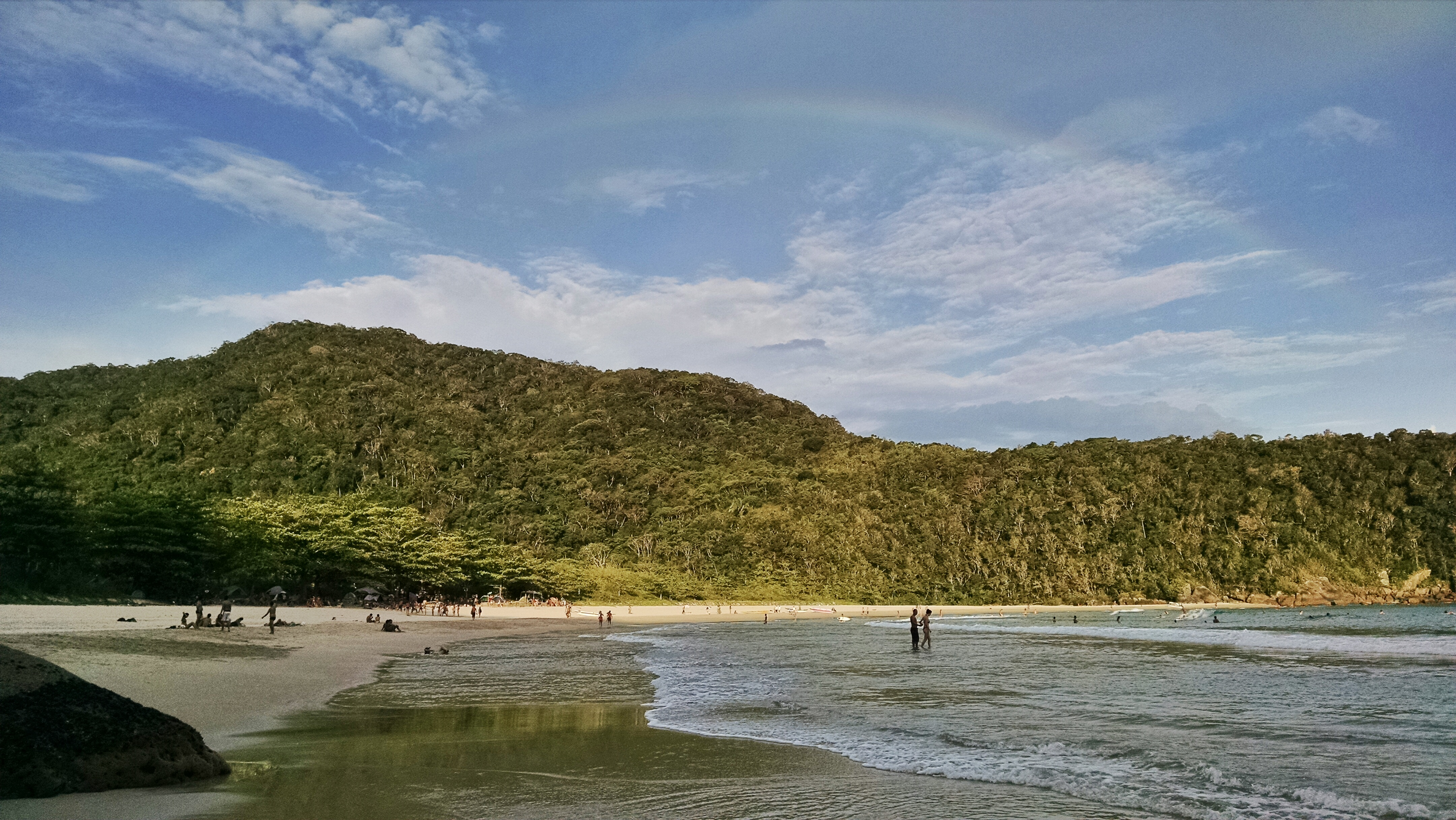
- Martim de Sá Beach

- Location within Brazil
- Nearest city: Paraty, Rio de Janeiro
- Coordinates: 23°14′25″S 44°38′05″W
- Designation: State park
- Created: 29 November 1972

The Paraty-Mirim State Park Portuguese: Parque Estadual De Paraty-Mirim), sometimes spelled Parati Mirim State Park, is a state park in the state of Rio de Janeiro, Brazil. It preserves a ruined village that was once a significant port.

== Location ==
The former village of Paraty-Mirim is on the southern coast of the state about 15 kilometres (9.3 mi) from the municipal seat of Paraty. The village was once an alternative to the port of Paraty for shipping gold and conducting other transactions. During the coffee boom it was also a place were slaves were landed, often illegally, for the São Paulo plantations. The village became depopulated during the 19th century. All that remains is a colonial residence, a church dedicated to Our Lady of Conception, and many ruins. The village is protected by the Paraty-Mirim State Park, the Cairuçu Environmental Protection Area and the Juatinga Ecological Reserve.

The Paraty-Mirim State Park covers an area of unusual beauty, with wide slopes covered by abundant vegetation. The park contains the beach, the river and the indigenous reserve of Paraty-Mirim. The ruins have been listed by the National Institute of Historic and Artistic Heritage (IPHAN). The park is contained with the Cairuçu Environmental Protection Area.

== History ==
The Paraty-Mirim State Park was created by state decree 15.927 of 29 November 1972. Since it was in a tourist region, it became the Paraty-Mirim State Recreation Area (Portuguese: área estadual de lazer de Paraty-Mirim) by Decree 996 of 17 November 1976. Later it was transformed into an ecological park to prevent the expansion of tourism from damaging the local ecosystem.

Public hearings were held in October 2013 on re-categorizing the Paraty Mirim State Recreation Area and the Juatinga Ecological Reserve as a State Park and a state-level Sustainable Development Reserve conforming to the definitions in the National System of Nature Conservation Units (SNUC). The best preserved areas of the recreation area would be contained in the State Park.

== Sources ==
- "Arredores de Paraty: Paraty-Mirim", Cidades Históricas Brasileiras (in Portuguese)
- "Consulta pública em Paraty, RJ, discute situação de áreas protegidas", G1 Globo (in Portuguese), 24 October 2013
- "Paraty Parques e reservas: Parque Ecológico de Paraty-Mirim", UOL Viagem (in Portuguese)
- "Parque Estadual De Paraty-Mirim", ParatyBrasil (in Portuguese), archived from the original on 2016-03-03
