= Sobreiro =

Sobreiro is, along with sobreira, the Portuguese (and old Galician) name for the cork oak tree (Quercus suber), and may refer to:

== Places ==
- O Sobreiro, a place in the Xustáns parish, Ponte Caldelas municipality, Galicia (Spain)
- Sobreiro, a place in the Lavadores parish, Vigo municipality, Galicia (Spain)
- Sobreiro, a little hamlet in the Mafra municipality (Portugal)
- Sobreiró de Baixo, a parish in Vinhais municipality (Portugal)
- Bairro dos Sobreiros, a place in Rio Maior municipality (Portugal)
- Vale Sobreiro, a place in Caranguejeira parish, in Leiria municipality (Portugal)

== Art works ==
- O Sobreiro, a 1905 painting by Carlos I of Portugal

== See also ==
- Sobreira (disambiguation)
- Sobroso
- Sobro
- Sobral (disambiguation)
- Sobrado (disambiguation)
- Sobredo
- Sobrido
