= Paraty Airport =

Paraty Airport Aeroporto de Paraty
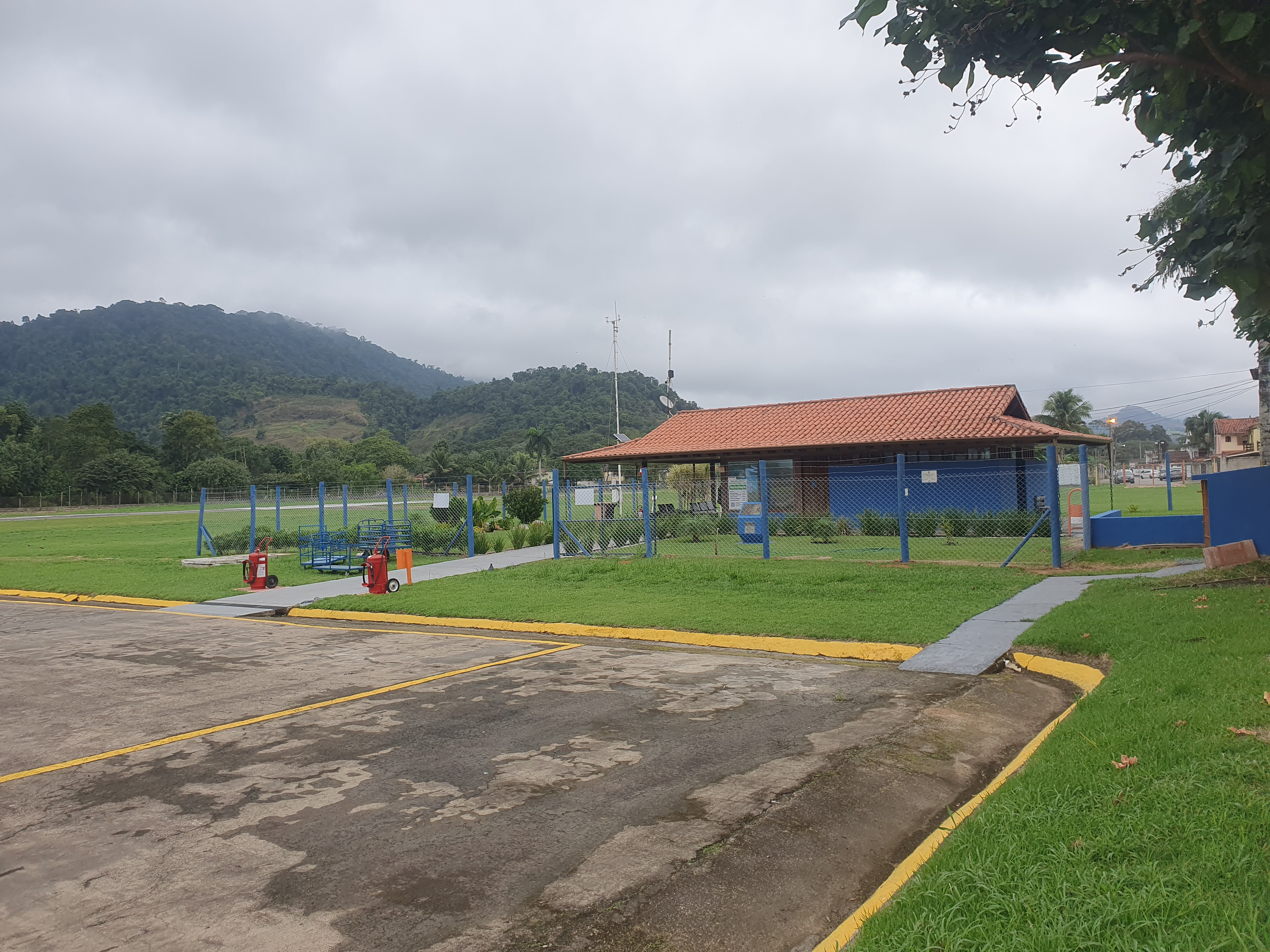
- Terminal seen from the apron
- IATA: JPY; ICAO: SDTK; LID: RJ0011

Summary
- Airport type: Public
- Serves: Paraty
- Time zone: BRT (UTC−03:00)
- Elevation AMSL: 3 m (9.8 ft)
- Coordinates: 23°13′26″S 044°43′24″W

Map
- Location in Brazil JPY (Brazil)

Runways
| Direction | Length | | Surface |
| Direction | m | ft | Surface |
|---|---|---|---|
| 10/28 | 850 | 2,789 | Asphalt |
- Sources: ANAC, DECEA

Paraty Airport (IATA: JPY, ICAO: SDTK), is the airport serving Paraty, Brazil.

== Access ==
The airport is located 2 km (1 mi) from downtown Paraty.

== Gallery ==
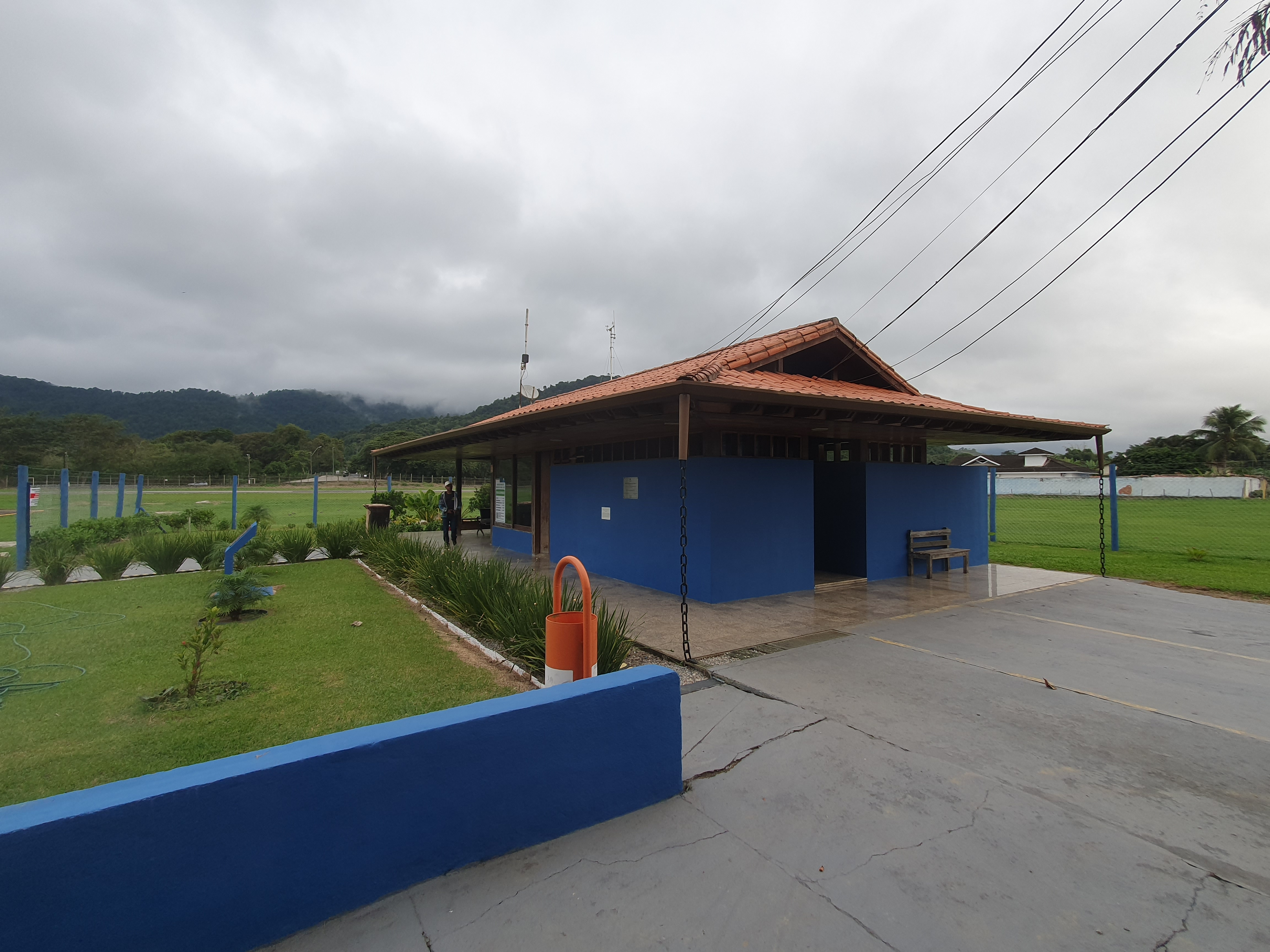
Paraty Airport terminal landside

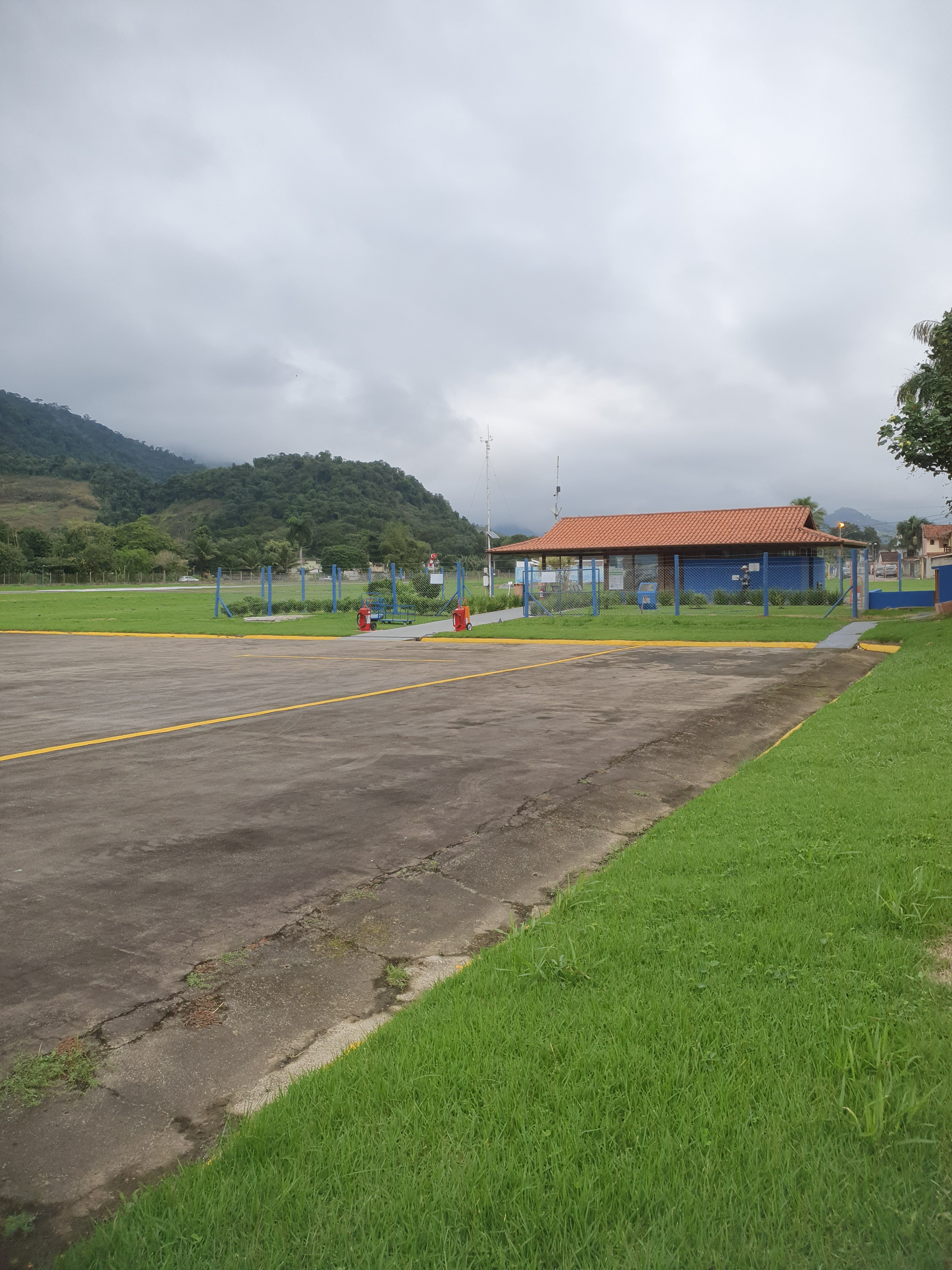
Paraty Airport apron view

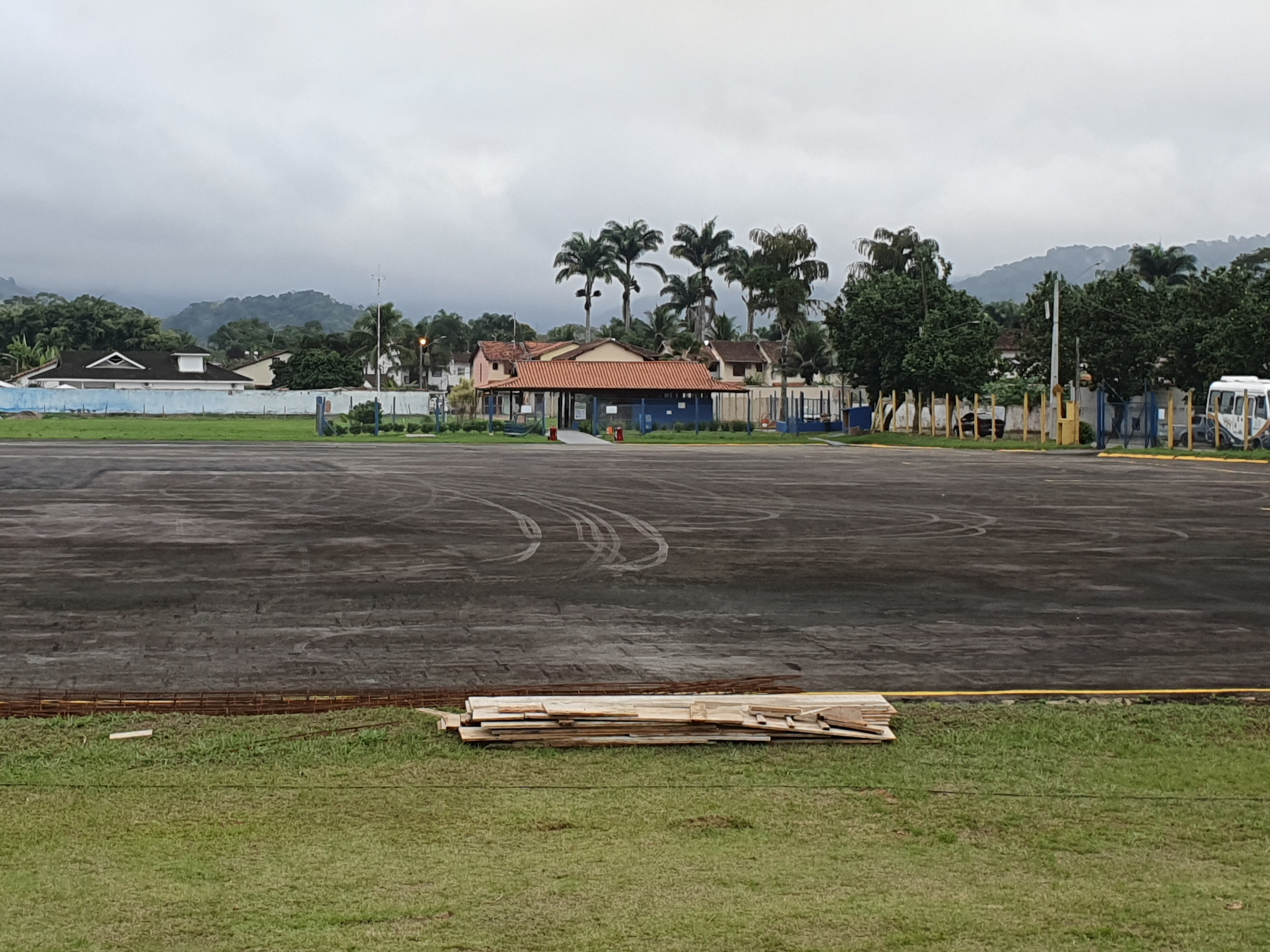
Paraty Airport apron view

== See also ==
- List of airports in Brazil
