= Cairuçu Environmental Protection Area =

- Área de Proteção Ambiental de Cairuçu
- IUCN category V (protected landscape/seascape)
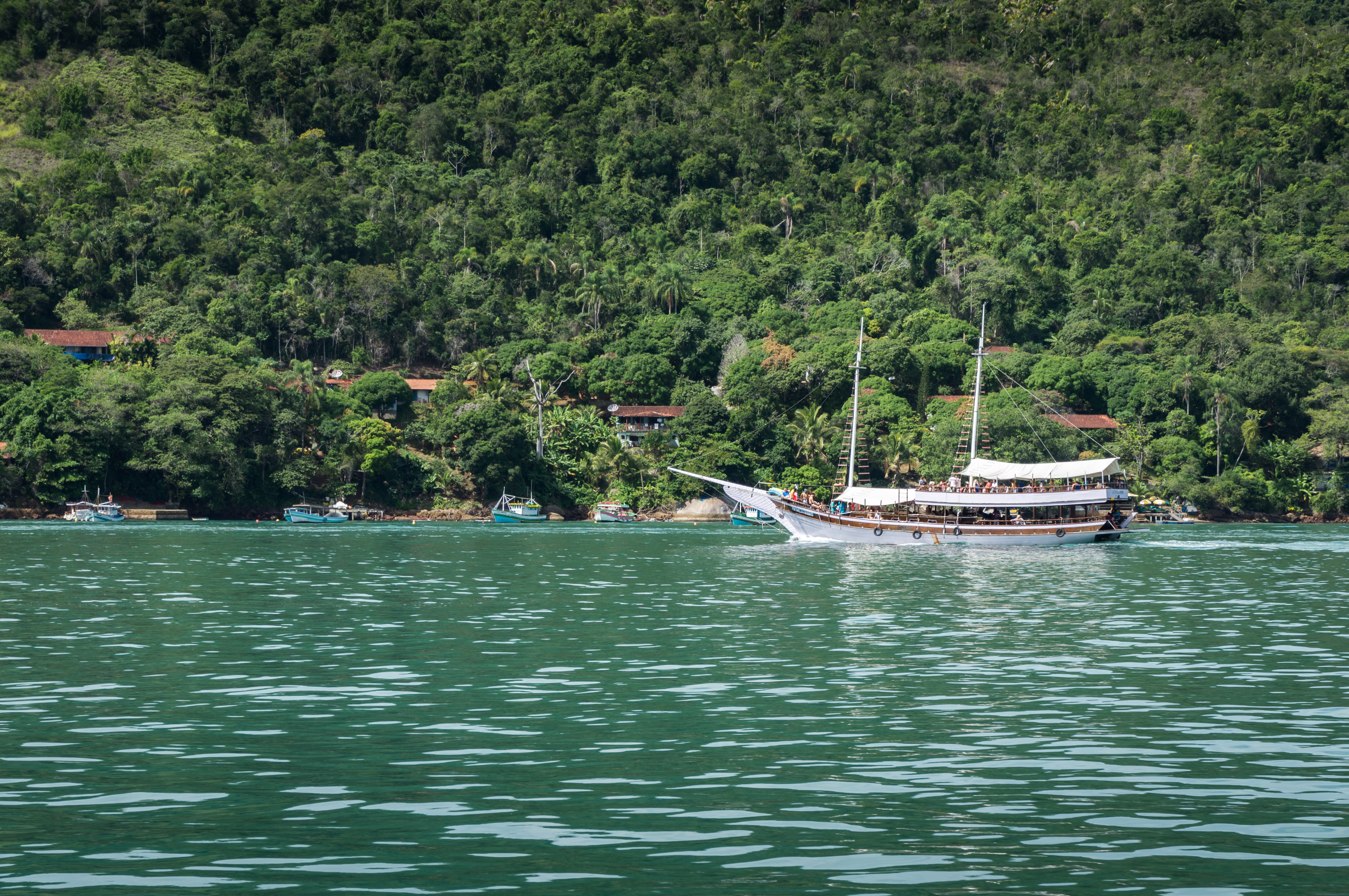
- Coast near Paraty

- Location within Brazil
- Nearest city: Paraty, State of Rio de Janeiro
- Coordinates: 23.278°S 44.677°W
- Area: 32,610 hectares (80,600 acres)
- Designation: Environmental Protection Area
- Created: 27 December 1985

UNESCO World Heritage Site
- Part of: Paraty and Ilha Grande – Culture and Biodiversity
- Criteria: Mixed: v, x
- Reference: 1308rev-004
- Inscription: 2019 (43rd Session)

Cairuçu Environmental Protection Area (Portuguese: Área de Proteção Ambiental de Cairuçu) is a protected area in the south of Rio de Janeiro state, Brazil. It contains an important remnant of the Atlantic Forest biome.

== Location ==
Cairuçu Environmental Protection Area lies in the Paraty municipality in the south of Rio de Janeiro state. It has a continental land area of 33,800 hectares (84,000 acres) plus 63 islands with a total of 890.72 hectares (2,201.0 acres). It includes the villages of Guarani Araponga and Paraty-Mirim, the Quilombo do Campinho, the Juatinga Ecological Reserve and the Paraty Bay, Paraty-Mirim and Saco do Mamanguá Municipal Environmental Protection Area. It adjoins and in some areas overlaps the Serra da Bocaina National Park. It contains the Paraty-Mirim State Park, created in 1972. It is part of the 221,754-hectare (547,970-acre) Bocaina Mosaic, created in 2006.

== Purpose ==
The environmental protection area was established on 27 December 1985 and is administered by the Chico Mendes Institute for Biodiversity Conservation. It is classed as IUCN protected area category V: protected landscape/seascape. The purpose is to preserve nature, scenic landscapes, fauna, flora and water systems as well as the traditional communities of caiçaras, quilombolas and indigenous people. (Note: Caiçaras are people of south and south east Brazil descended from a mix of Europeans, Africans and indigenous people who live by traditional occupations such as fishing, agriculture and crafts. Quilombolas are descendants of African slaves who escaped and formed villages called quilombos in remote areas.) It tries to reconcile human activities with preservation of wildlife and other natural resources.

== Environment ==
The region includes an important remnant of the Atlantic Forest biome including the various transitions from coastal mangroves to humid tropical forest on the hillsides. Protected species include southern muriqui (Brachyteles arachnoides), buffy-tufted marmoset (Callithrix aurita), oncilla (Leopardus tigrinus), green sea turtle (Chelonia mydas), sea ginger coral (Millepora alcicornis), catfish (Trichogenes longipinnis), black-capped piprites (Piprites pileata), white-necked hawk (Leucopternis lacernulatus), brown-backed parrotlet (Touit melanonotus) and Chaco eagle (Harpyhaliaetus coronatus).

== Sources ==
- APA Cairuçu: Quem Somos (in Portuguese), ICMBio, archived from the original on 2016-06-06
- APA de Cairuçu (in Portuguese), Chico Mendes Institute for Biodiversity Conservation.
- Mosaico de Unidades de Conservação da Bocaina - SP e RJ (PDF) (in Portuguese), RBMA, archived from the original (PDF) on 2016-10-11
- "Paraty Parques e reservas: Parque Ecológico de Paraty-Mirim", UOL Viagem (in Portuguese)
- Unidade de Conservação: Área de Proteção Ambiental de Cairuçu (in Portuguese), MMA: Ministério do Meio Ambiente
