= Paraty Bay, Paraty-Mirim and Saco do Mamanguá Environmental Protection Area =

Protected area in Rio de Janeiro, Brazil

- Área de Proteção Ambiental Baia de Paraty, Paraty-Mirim e Saco do Mamanguá
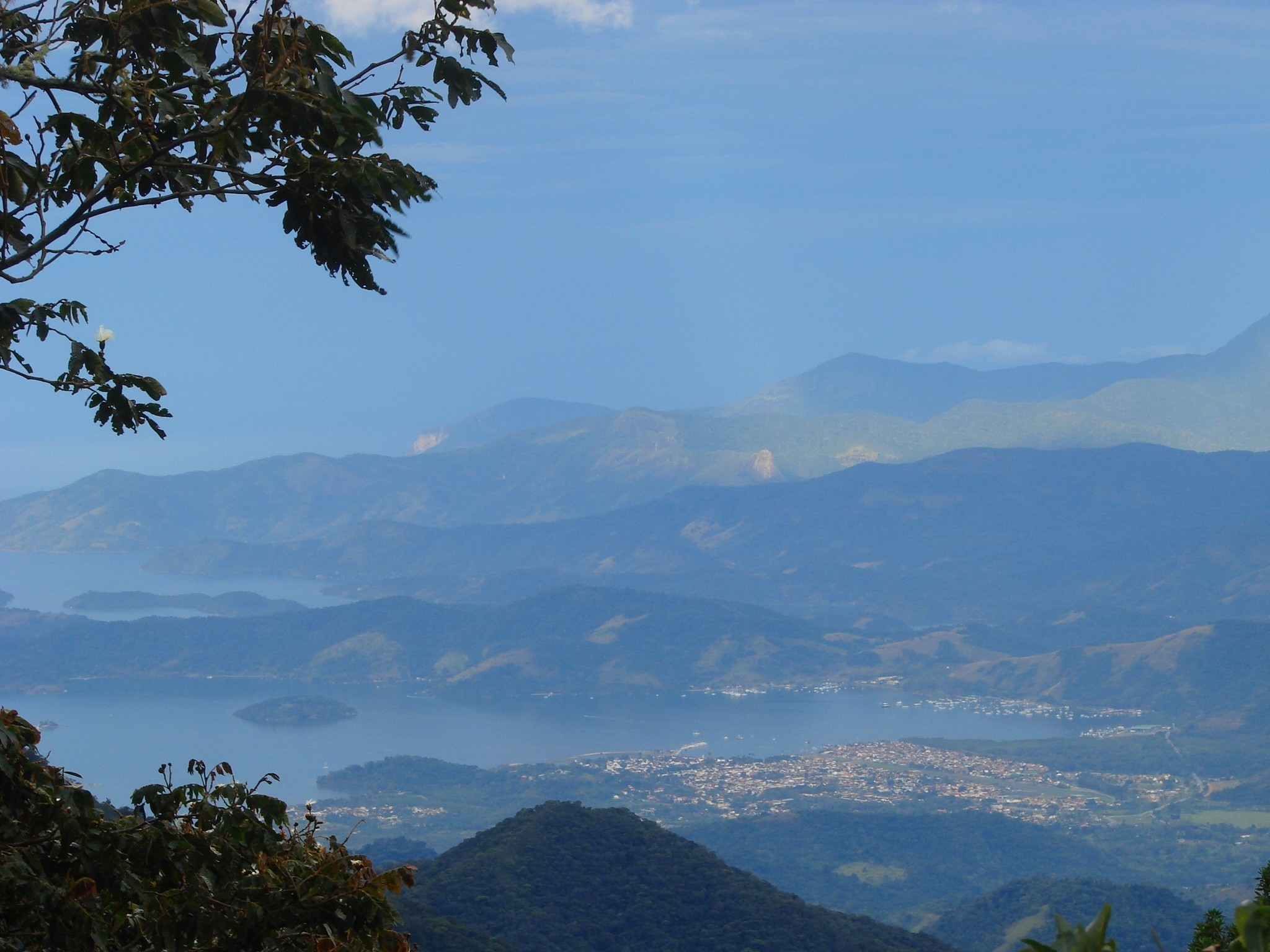
- Partial view of the Baía de Parati

- Location within Brazil
- Nearest city: Paraty, Rio de Janeiro
- Coordinates: 23°12′54″S 44°41′37″W
- Area: 5,642 hectares (13,940 acres)
- Designation: Environmental protection area
- Created: 11 October 1984
- Administrator: Secretaria Municipal de Meio Ambiente, Pesca e Agricultura de Paraty/ Prefeitura Municipal de Parati

The Paraty Bay, Paraty-Mirim and Saco do Mamanguá Environmental Protection Area (Portuguese: Área de Proteção Ambiental Baia de Paraty, Paraty-Mirim e Saco do Mamanguá) is a municipal environmental protection area in the state of Rio de Janeiro, Brazil.

== Location ==
The Paraty Bay, Paraty-Mirim and Saco do Mamanguá Environmental Protection Area (APA) is in the municipality of Paraty, Rio de Janeiro. It is administered by the municipal department of the environment, fishing and agriculture. It is part of the Bocaina Mosaic of conservation units. The federally administered 33,800-hectare (84,000-acre) Cairuçu Environmental Protection Area contains the APA.

The ecosystems in the APA are of great importance in maintaining the fishing resources and exceptional scenic beauty which attracts international tourists and contributes to the economy of the region. Forbidden activities include bottom trawling, collection of shellfish for sale, any potentially polluting industries, and any other activities that would compromise maintenance of the ecosystems. However, these prohibitions are not enforced. As of 2016 the APA did not have a headquarters, management plan or managing council.

== History ==
The Paraty Bay, Paraty-Mirim and Saco do Mamanguá Environmental Protection Area was created by municipal law 685 on 11 October 1984, and was resized by law 744 of 9 November 1987. It covers an area of 5,642 hectares (13,940 acres) of the Bay of Paraty, Paraty Mirim and the Saco do Mamanguá. The objective is to protect the breeding areas of marine organisms in the municipality.

== Sources ==
- Área de Proteção Ambiental (APA) de Cairuçu: Quem Somos (in Portuguese), ICMBio, archived from the original on 2016-06-06
- Secretaria de Desenvolvimento Urbano e Meio Ambiente de Paraty - SEDUMA (in Portuguese), SEDUMA
- Unidades de Conservação que compõem os três novos Mosaicos do Corredor da Serra do Mar (PDF) (in Portuguese), MMA: Ministerio do Meio Ambiente, 14 December 2006
