= Sobral (surname) =

Sobral is a Portuguese surname. Notable people with the surname include:

- Carlos Sobral (born 1950), Brazilian jewelry designer
- Figueiredo Sobral (1926 – 13 August 2010), Portuguese painter, sculptor and poet.
- José María Sobral (1880–1961), Argentine military scientist and Antarctic explorer
- Leila Sobral (born 1974), Brazilian basketball player
- Luísa Sobral (born 1987), Portuguese singer and songwriter
- Marcos Sobral (born 1960), Brazilian botanist
- Marta Sobral (born 1964), Brazilian female basketball player
- Manuel Sobral (born 1968), Canadian welterweight boxer
- Renato Sobral (born 1975), Brazilian professional mixed martial arts fighter
- Salvador Sobral (born 1989), Portuguese singer
