= Carlos Sobral =

Carlos Sobral is a Brazilian designer. He began his career in 1960s Rio de Janeiro. Sobral took, and continues to take, an environmentally responsible approach by working with unusual recycled materials such as recycled tires.

== Career ==
Sobral traveled for years between craft fairs and cultural events and consulted restaurants to find buyers for his hand-crafted goods. Distribution was challenging, as other artists created and sold similar products in the same markets. However, in 1976, Sobral stumbled across a new material – resin – that proved to be a turning point in his career.

At a craft fair in Cabo Frio, Sobral first encountered jewelry made by Argentinean artisans from polyester resin. Unable to obtain information about the material from the artisans, Sobral investigated on his own. He discovered a source of resin and built a workshop on a small farm located in Jardim Alvorada, Nova Iguaçu, a suburb of Rio de Janeiro. Here, he launched his new company, Genesis, which eventually evolved into the current company, Sobral.

Sobral grew in size and popularity through the 1980s and 1990s, earning recognition and respect throughout the jewelry and fashion industries worldwide. Genesis evolved into Memphis, a better-equipped workshop that shared space with a local samba school. In 1982, Sobral traveled to Paris without the ability to speak French. Sobral opened a portable display to sell products when Parisians headed to the country for holidays during the summer months. The following year, Sobral chose a time better suited to selling products, and his designs quickly gained popularity in Europe. By 1988, Sobral was running a million-dollar company.

In 1991, Sobral opened a store in the Rio neighborhood of Ipanema, the first of many Sobral boutiques. His continued success in Paris was reflected in the various awards he received. He was awarded the Etoile de Mode five times at Paris's BIJORHCA designer jewelry show. Among 600 exhibitors worldwide, Sobral was honored by the Designer Jury in September 2004, the College Jury of the Paris Fashion School in January and September 2005, the press Jury in January 2006, and the Shop Jury in September 2006. Also in 2006, he received Best in Show for his “Pop Art” collection. The following year, designer Karl Lagerfeld commissioned Sobral to create accessories for the Maison Karl Lagerfeld Summer 2008 collection.

== Current status ==
As of 2010, Sobral has 17 boutiques throughout North America, South America, and Europe, including stores in New York City, Paris, Rio de Janeiro, São Paulo, Heidelberg, Honfleur, Armação dos Búzio, and Paraty. Sobral also has a vast network of distributors, and the company's designs are sold in hundreds of authorized retail shops on four continents.

Sobral continues his work in Jardim Alvorada, living with his wife Elisa and their adopted stray dogs.
