= Juatinga Ecological Reserve =

Protected area in Rio de Janeiro, Brazil

- Reserva Ecológica Estadual da Juatinga
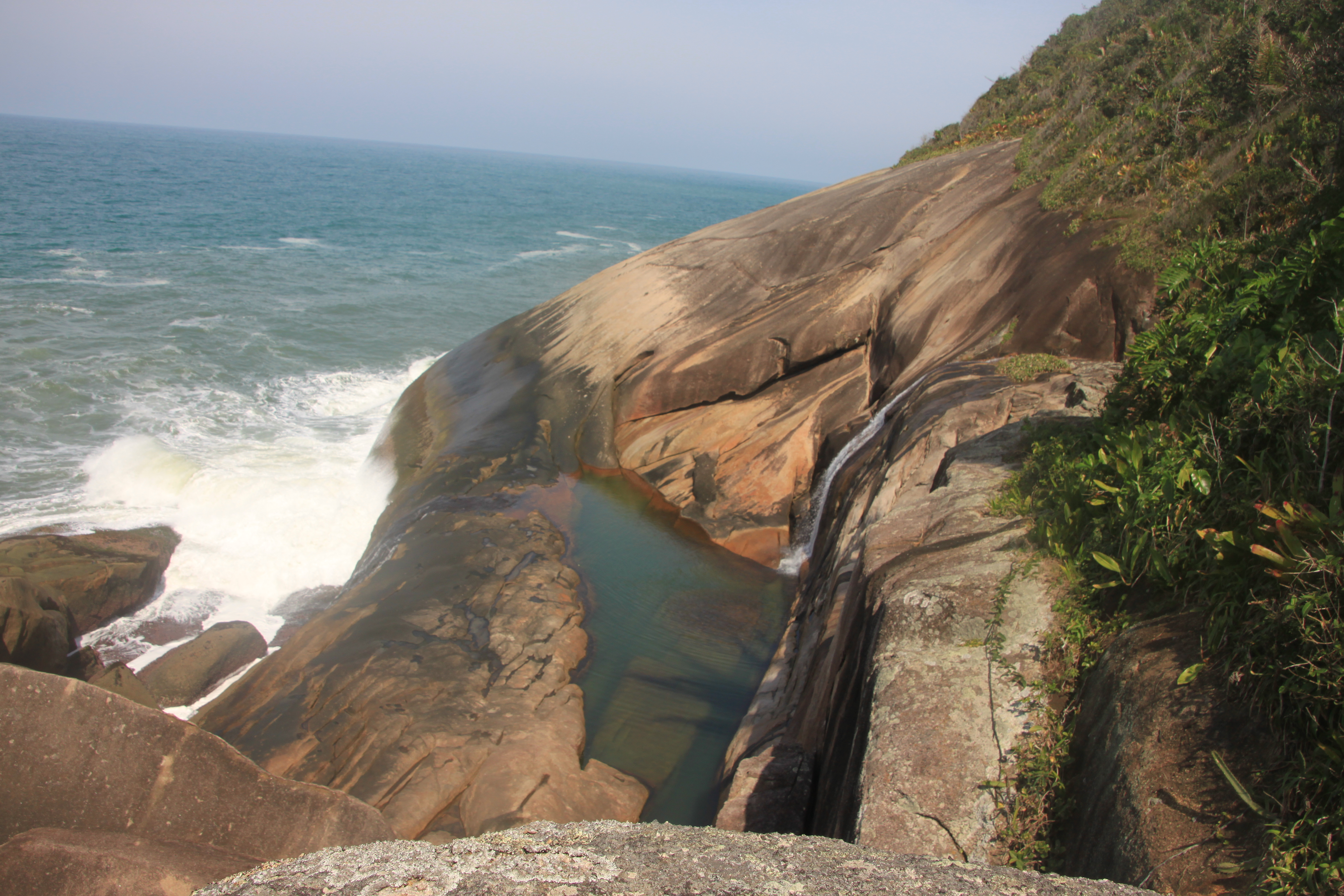
- Saco Bravo waterfall

- Location within Brazil
- Nearest city: Paraty, Rio de Janeiro
- Coordinates: 23°16′45″S 44°32′15″W
- Area: 9,960 ha (38.5 sq mi)
- Designation: Ecological reserve
- Created: 30 October 1992

The Juatinga Ecological Reserve (Portuguese: Reserva Ecológica Estadual da Juatinga) is an ecological reserve in the state of Rio de Janeiro, Brazil. It protects a rugged peninsula projecting into the Atlantic Ocern that is mainly covered by Atlantic Forest, and also helps maintain the traditional lifestyle of residents of small villages along the coast.

== Location ==
The Juatinga Ecological Reserve is in the municipality of Paraty, Rio de Janeiro. It has an area of 9,960 hectares (24,600 acres). It is contained within the Cairuçu Environmental Protection Area. The reserve is part of the Atlantic Forest Biosphere Reserve.

The reserve protects a peninsula in the extreme east of the municipality that projects into the Atlantic Ocean. The Juatinga peninsula is in the northern Ribeira belt. The reserve has rugged terrain, located where the Serra do Mar meets the coastal plain, with elevations that range from sea level to over 1,000 metres (3,300 ft). It has granitoid rocks from the Proterozoic and sediments from the Cenozoic. The most common type of soil is Háplico cambisol, and there is also red-yellow latosol and humic cambisol.

== History ==
The reserve is in area where there has been intense pressure on the land from speculators and squatters. The Juatinga Ecological Reserve was created by state decree 17.981 of 30 October 1992. It is home to about 400 families, or 2,000 people, living in basic conditions in small coastal villages. It was created to promote the caiçaras culture of the residents of the reserve, reconciling their life style with conservation of the environment.

== Environment ==
The region has a tropical humid climate with a distinct rainy season. Annual rainfall ranges from 768 to 2,045 millimetres (30.2 to 80.5 in).

The Juatinga Ecological Reserve protects submontane and montane tropical rainforest, mangroves and restinga. Vegetation is mainly dense rainforest. Some areas contain vegetation in different stages of succession, including agricultural fields, scrub and secondary growth. A 2014 study of the Laranjeiras-Praia do Sono and Praia do Sono-Praia de Antigos trails in the south of the reserve found that one of the trails was somewhat degraded, and had ravine erosions in several places.

The primary rainforest at higher elevations protects threatened species such as the southern muriqui (Brachyteles arachnoides) and the jaguar (Panthera onca). The State Environmental Institute (INEA) arranged a weekend bird watching event in the reserve in August 2016 to raise environmental awareness. About twenty participants recorded 106 bird species.

== Sources ==
- "Juatinga Ecological Reserve", Chalés da Serra do Mar (in Portuguese)
- Observadores de pássaros registram mais de cem espécies de aves na reserva Ecológica Estadual da Juatinga, em Paraty (in Portuguese), SEA: Secretaria de Estado do Ambiente, 20 August 2016
- Rangel, Luana de Almeida; Guerra, Antonio José Teixeira (2014), "Degradação de trilhas na Reserva Ecológica da Juatinga em Paraty – Rio de Janeiro", Ambiente e Agua (in Portuguese), 9 (4), doi:10.4136/ambi-agua.1434
