= Paraty =

Historic municipality in Brazil

Coordinates: 23°13′10″S 44°42′53″W

- Municipality
- Municipality of Paraty
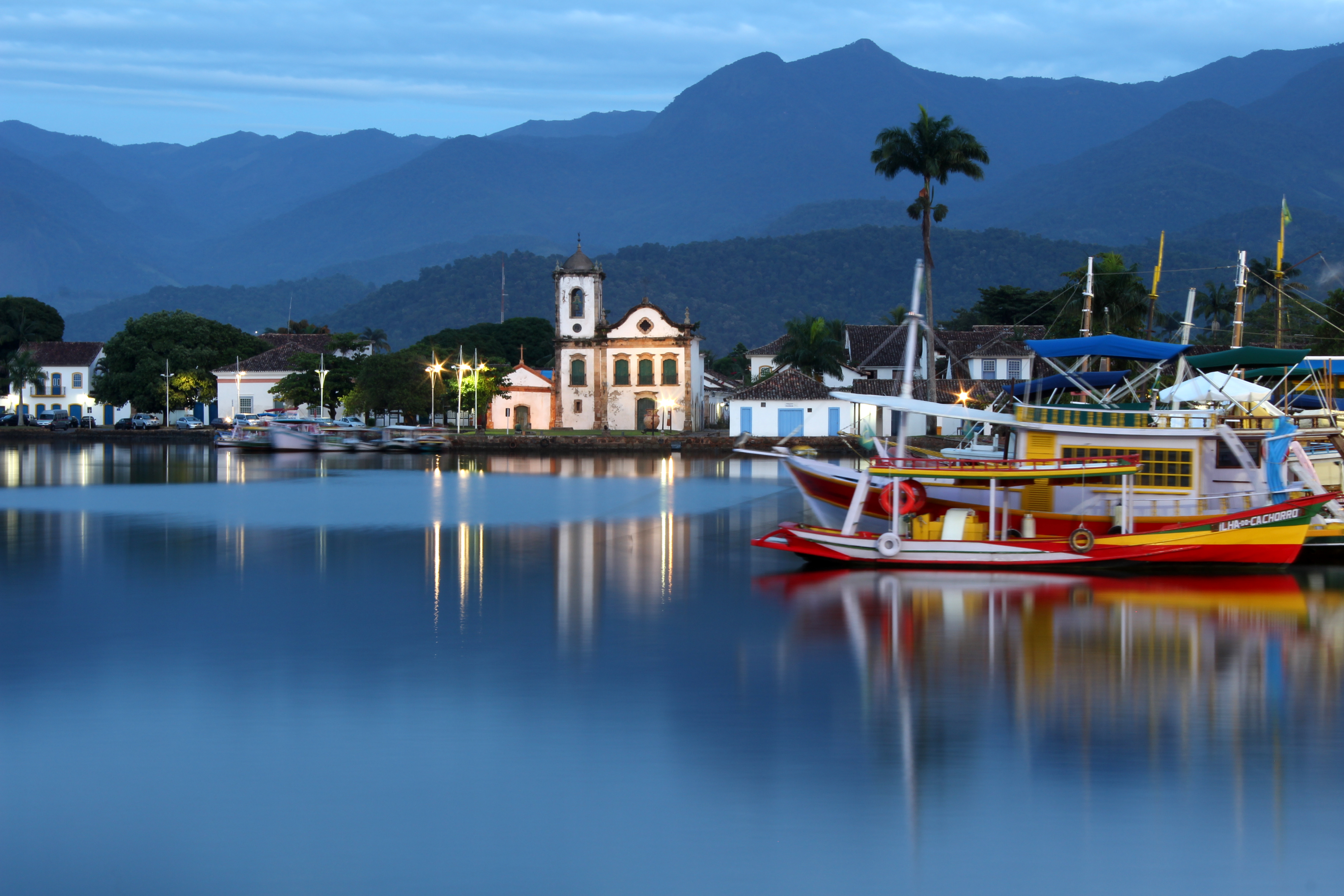
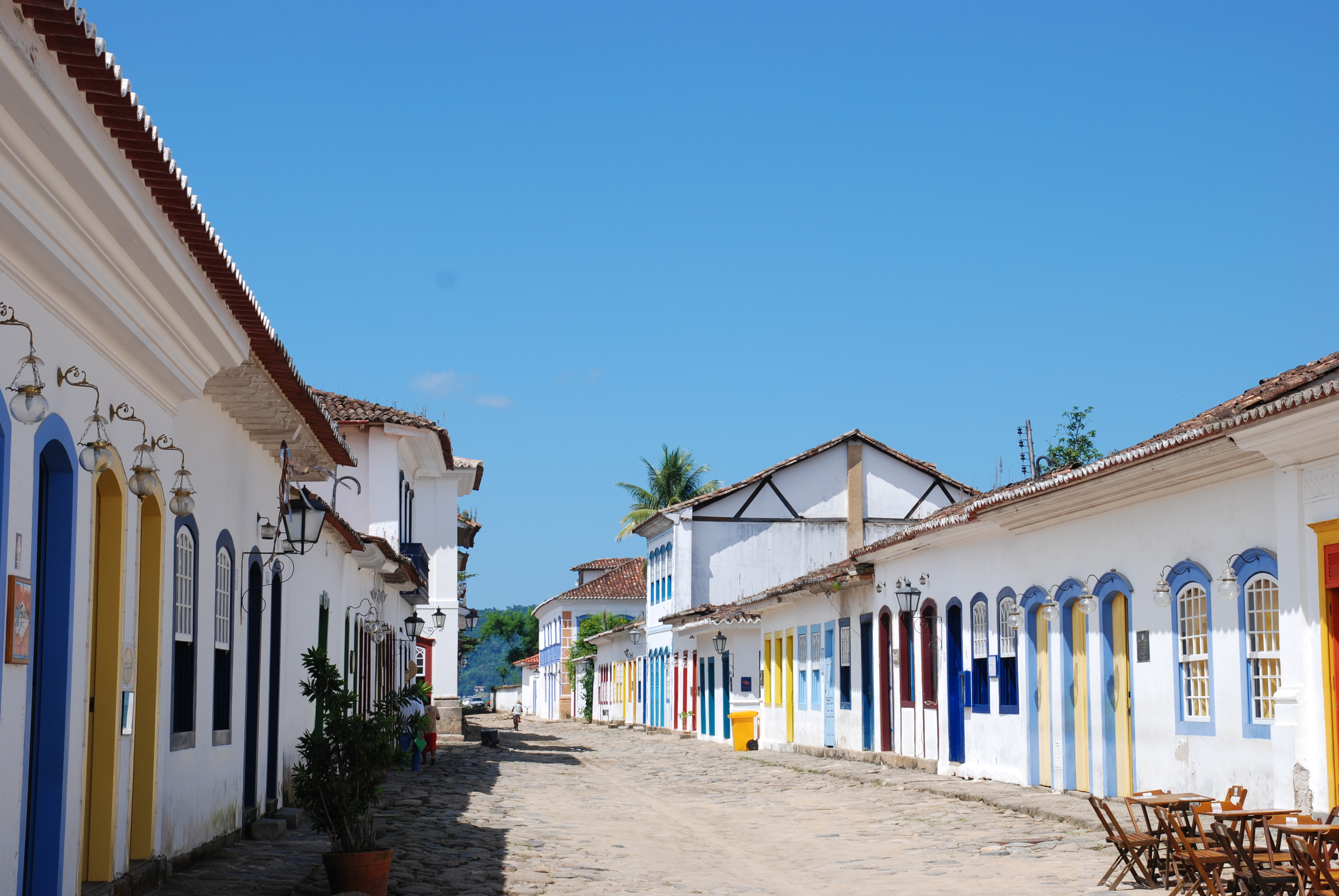
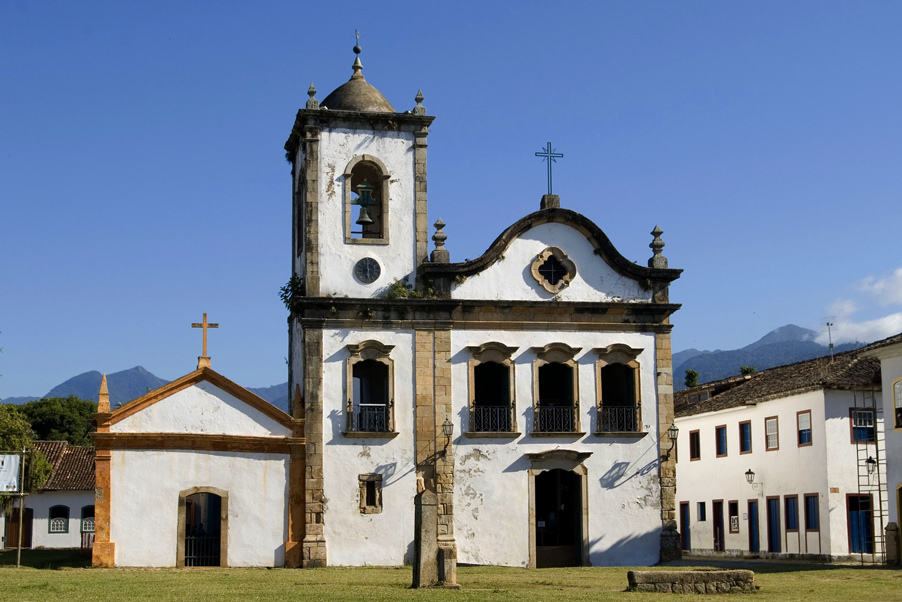
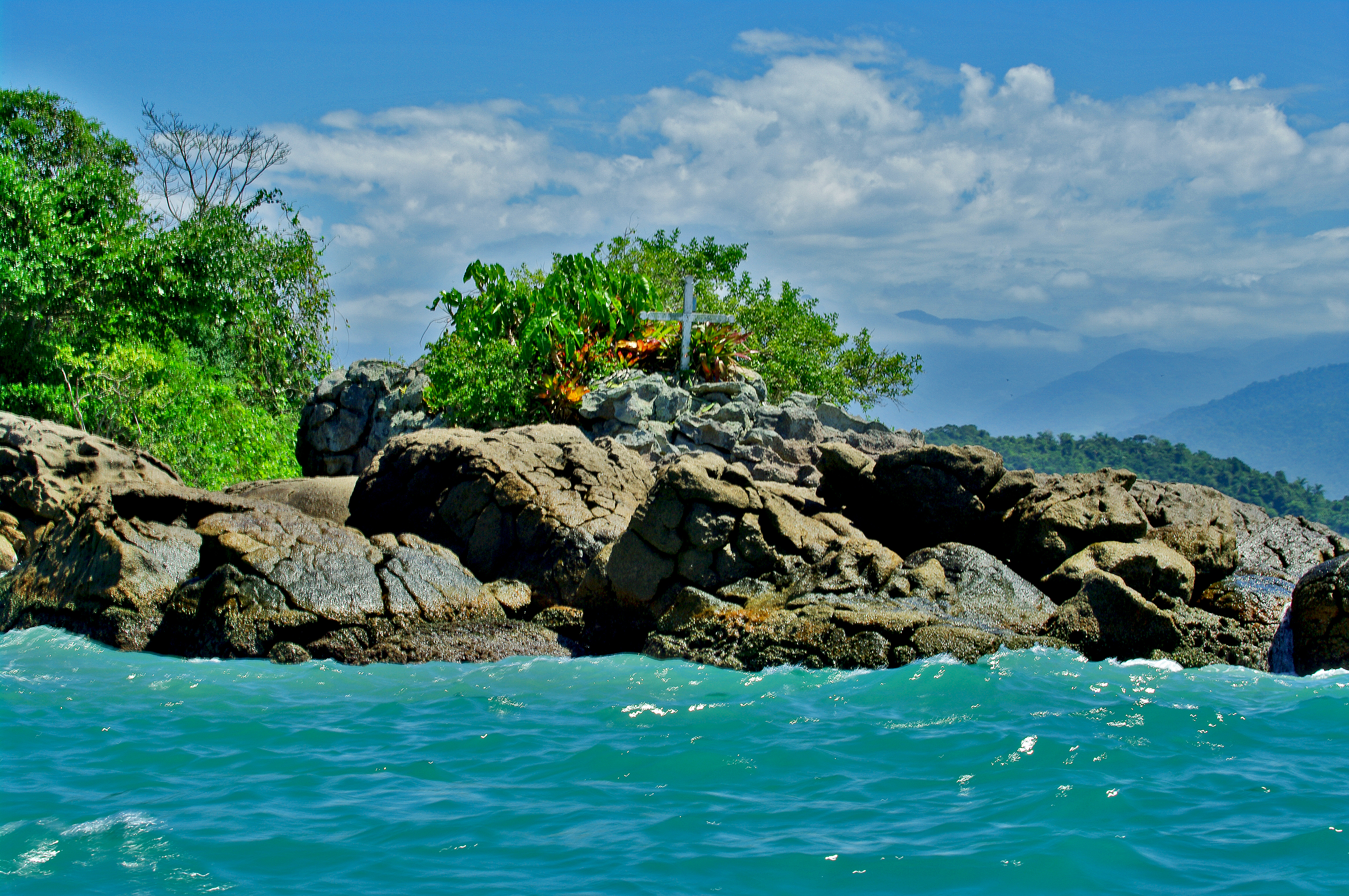
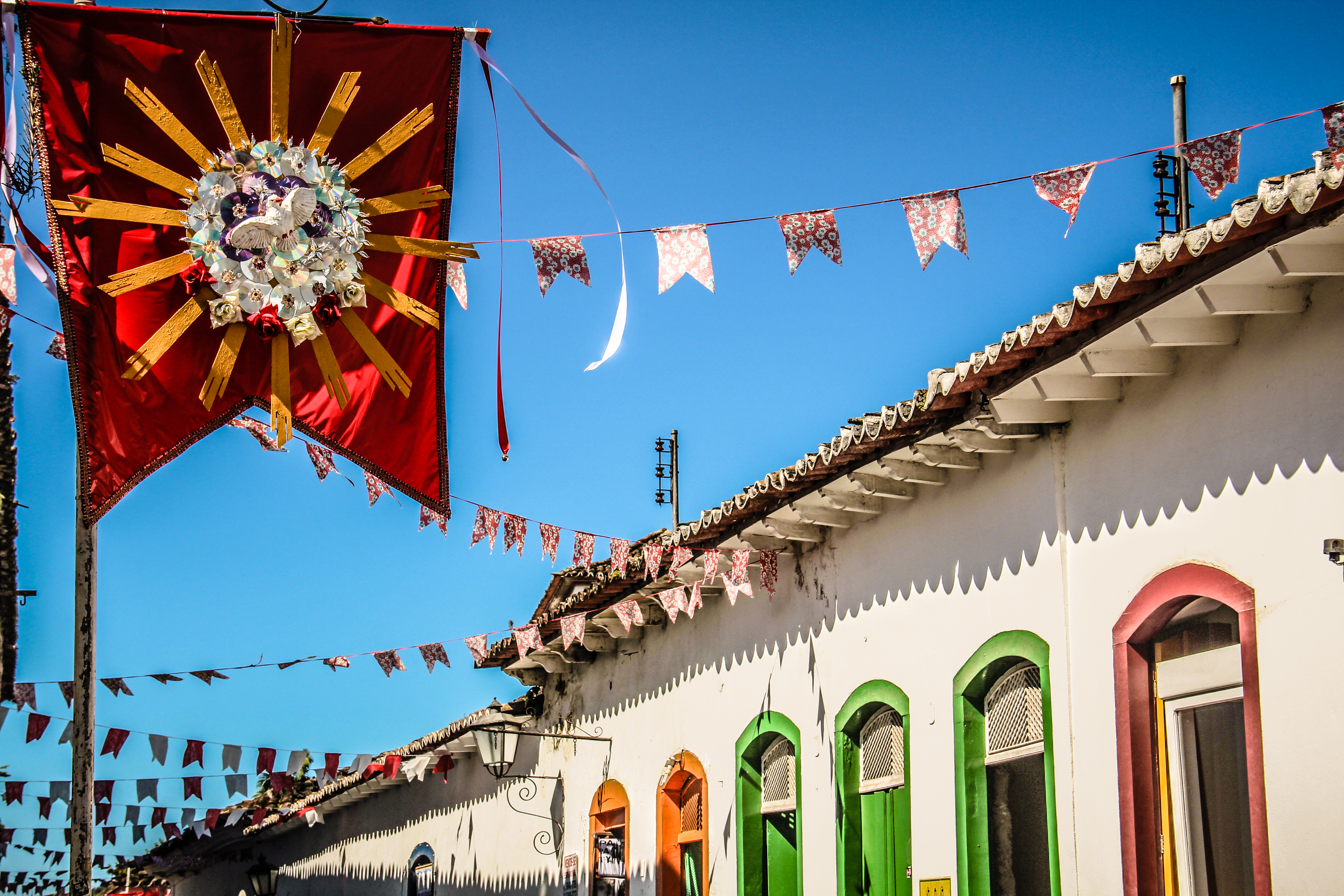
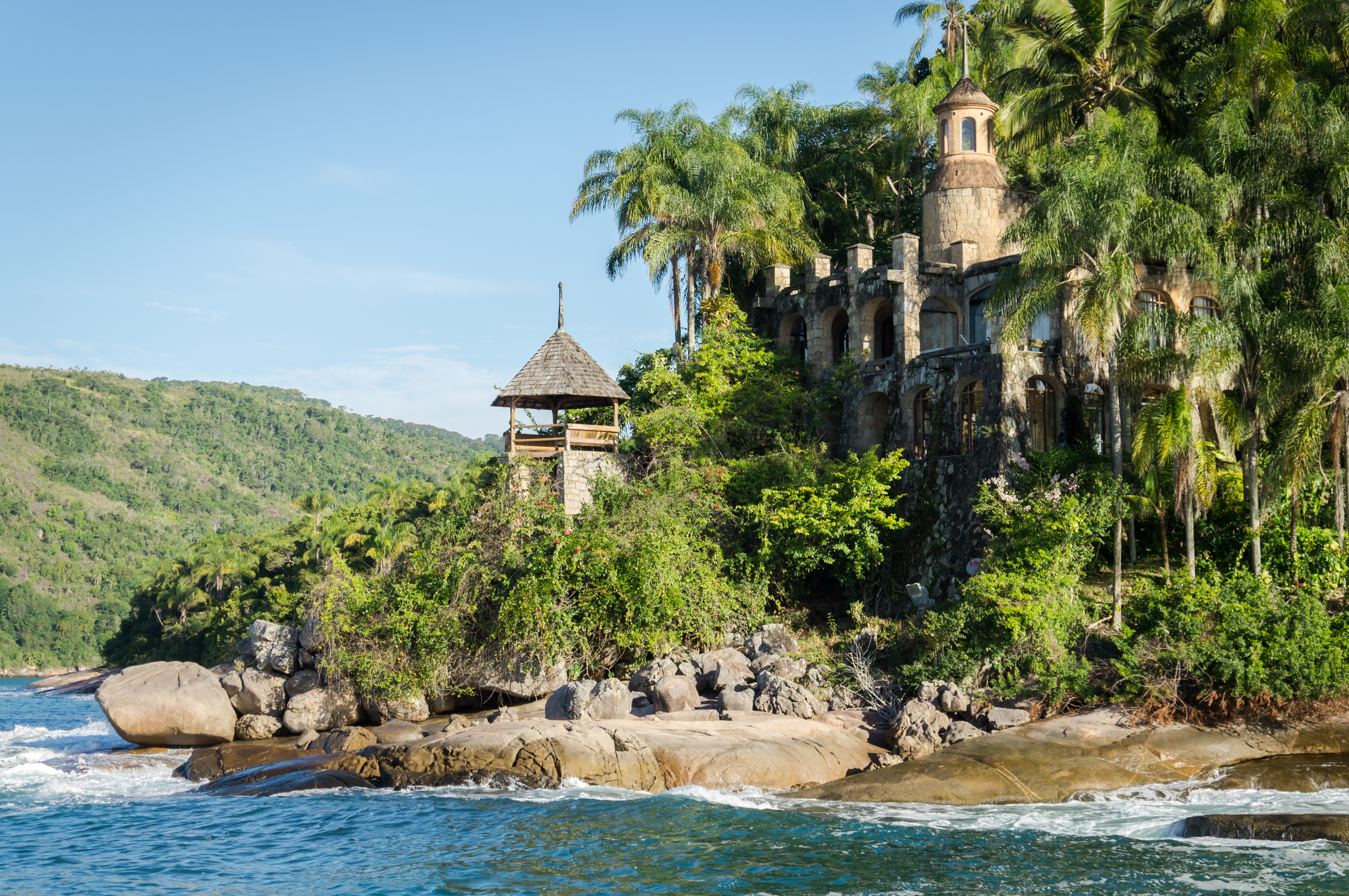

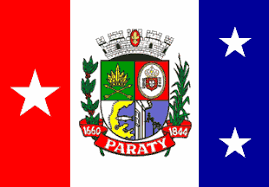
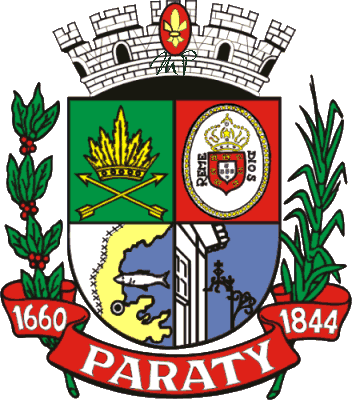
- Flag Coat of arms

- Location in Rio de Janeiro state
- Country: Brazil
- Region: Southeast
- State: Rio de Janeiro

Government
  - Mayor: José Carlos Porto Neto

Area
  - Total: 924.295 km^{2} (356.872 sq mi)
- Elevation: 5 m (16 ft)

Population (2025)
  - Total: 47,668
  - Density: 48.95/km^{2} (126.8/sq mi)
- Demonym(s): paratiense caiçara
- Time zone: UTC−3 (BRT)
- CEP: 23970-000
- HDI (2010): 0.693 – medium
- Website: paraty.rj.gov.br

UNESCO World Heritage Site
- Part of: Paraty and Ilha Grande – Culture and Biodiversity
- Criteria: Mixed: v, x
- Reference: 1308rev-005
- Inscription: 2019 (43rd Session)

Paraty (or Parati; Brazilian Portuguese pronunciation: [paɾaˈt͡ʃi]) is a Brazilian municipality on the southern coast of the state of Rio de Janeiro. It is 258 kilometres from the state capital, the city of Rio de Janeiro. Alongside the Atlantic Ocean, the municipal area has an average altitude of just five metres above sea level. It covers 924.295 square kilometres and has an estimated population of 47,668, giving a population density of 48.95 inhabitants per square kilometre. According to an estimate by the Brazilian Institute of Geography and Statistics (IBGE) from 2014, it ranks 43rd among the municipalities of the state of Rio de Janeiro by population.

== Toponym ==
The Tupinologist Eduardo Navarro, in his Dictionary of Old Tupi (2013), identifies the etymon parati'y, from Old Tupi, meaning "river of the paratis," formed by the combination of parati (parati) and 'y (river). Paraty refers both to a species of fish in the mullet family (Mugilidae) and to a variety of cassava; however, Navarro states that the place name derives from the name of the fish.

The demonym for Paraty is spelled with an "i": its inhabitants are known as Paratienses.

== Geography ==
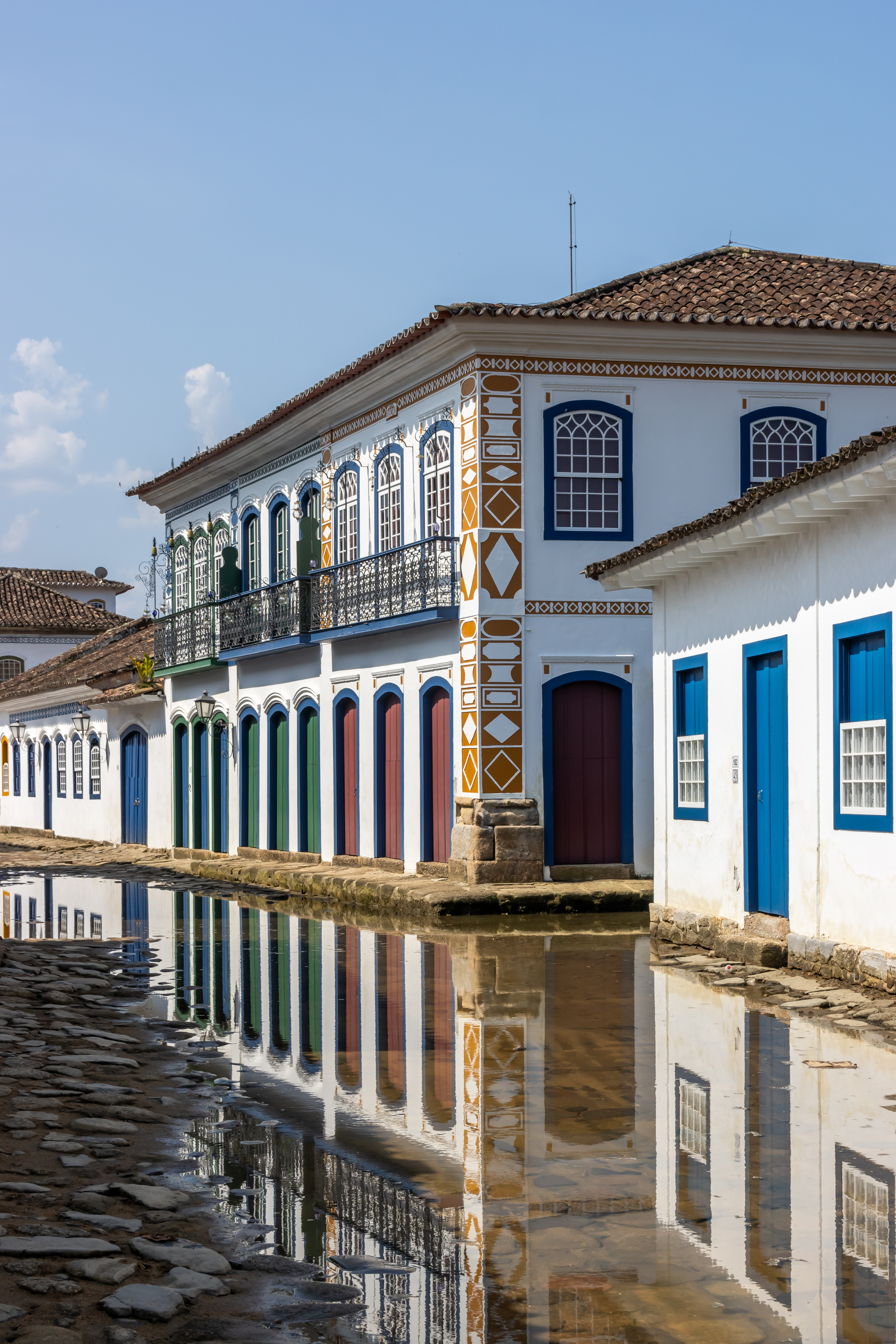
Water floods Paraty's streets during high tide

The town is located on the Bay of Ilha Grande, which is dotted with many tropical islands. Rising as high as 1,300 meters behind the town are tropical forests, mountains, and waterfalls. It is the southernmost and westernmost city in Rio de Janeiro state.

Paraty is listed by IPHAN as a National Historic Landmark. More than 80% of its territory is protected by conservation units:

- Cairuçu Environmental Protection Area, where the village of Trindade is located
- Tamoios Ecological Station
- Serra da Bocaina National Park
- Baia de Paraty, Paraty Mirim and Saco do Mamanguá Environmental Protection Area
- Juatinga Ecological Reserve

Nearby is the Serra do Mar State Park of São Paulo. The municipality also includes an indigenous village and an Afro-Brazilian quilombo settlement.

=== Climate ===
Paraty exhibits a tropical monsoon climate. Temperature lows range from 11 to 19 °C (52 to 66 °F), while highs range from 23 to 29 °C (73 to 84 °F). Its wettest month is January, with an average of 19 rainfall days. Sea temperatures remain consistently warm, ranging from 21.8 to 26.3 °C (71.2 to 79.3 °F).

== Municipal symbols ==
=== Flag ===
The flag of Paraty was adopted on August 12, 1967. The overall colors of the flag represent the following traits: gold signifies strength, silver represents innocence, red is bravery, blue serenity, and green is the color of abundance.

Red, white, and blue are the three colors that have traditionally been used to decorate the historic houses of the city. The colors are displayed in three vertical stripes, with a coat of arms on the center. The large white star on the red stripe symbolizes the first district, and on the blue stripe two small stars represent the second and third districts. The three stars are placed in a triangular form, in homage to the strong presence of Freemasonry in the architecture of the city. The crown represents the royal traditions that discovered the country and founded the independent country. The real reason for green is the Portuguese house of Bragança and yellow for the Austrian house of Habsburg (Dom Pedro I and Dona Leopoldina).

=== Coat of arms ===
The coat of arms shown on the flag was adopted on November 30, 1960. The four quarters of the coat of arms symbolize the following:

1. The first green-colored quarter on the upper left-hand side with a feathered headdress above two crossed arrows, represents the original inhabitants of the region, the Guaianás tribe.
2. The second quarter in red with a white oval seal with the royal Portuguese coat of arms surrounded by the word "Remédios," a seal which was used in colonial times to authenticate official documents; Our Lady of Remedies has been patron saint of the town since 1646.
3. The third quarter, which is white, blue and yellow is an outline of the city and the bay with a superimposed silver fish that is perhaps a reference to Tupi language origin of the city name.
4. Finally the fourth quarter of blue shows the corner of a colonial house and a wrought-iron rail which is representative of the colonial-style houses that exemplify Paraty.

The flora which supports the red scroll are a branch of coffee tree and a stalk of sugarcane. The scroll itself bears the inscription "1660 Paraty 1844" These are the dates that Paraty initially achieved status as a town and then later city status. Above the shield is a crown consisting of five towers, with the center tower emblazoned with a red shield bearing a gold fleur-de-lis, which symbolizes Our Lady of Remedies, the patron saint of the city.

== History ==
The village of Paraty was founded in 1597. It was established formally as a town by Portuguese colonists in 1667, in a region populated by the Guaianás Indians.

The Guaianás people who lived where the city now stands called the entire area "Paraty". In the Tupi language "Paraty" means "river of fish". Even today the Brazilian Mullet (Mugil brasiliensis) still come back to spawn in the rivers that spill into the Bay of Paraty. When the region was colonized by the Portuguese, they adopted the Guaianás name for their new town.

=== The Gold Trail ===
After the discovery of the world's richest gold mines in 1696 in the mountains of Minas Gerais, Paraty became an export port for gold to Rio de Janeiro and from there on to Portugal. The ensuing gold rush led to the construction of the "Caminho do Ouro" or "Gold Trail", a 1200 kilometer road, paved in steep areas with large stones, which connected Paraty to Diamantina via Ouro Preto and Tiradentes. Not only was it used to transport gold to Paraty, but it was also used to convey supplies, miners and African slaves by mule train over the mountains to and from the gold mining areas. Two sections of the Caminho do Ouro have been excavated near Paraty and are now a tourist destination for hiking.

The Gold Trail fell into disuse because of attacks on the gold laden ships bound for Rio de Janeiro by pirates who frequented the islands and coves of the Bay of Angra dos Reis. Eventually a safer overland route from Minas Gerais to Rio de Janeiro was created because of these pirate raids. Finally, the gold itself began to run out in the late 18th century, and Paraty declined.

The Gold Trail was submitted for inclusion on the World Heritage List in August 2004.

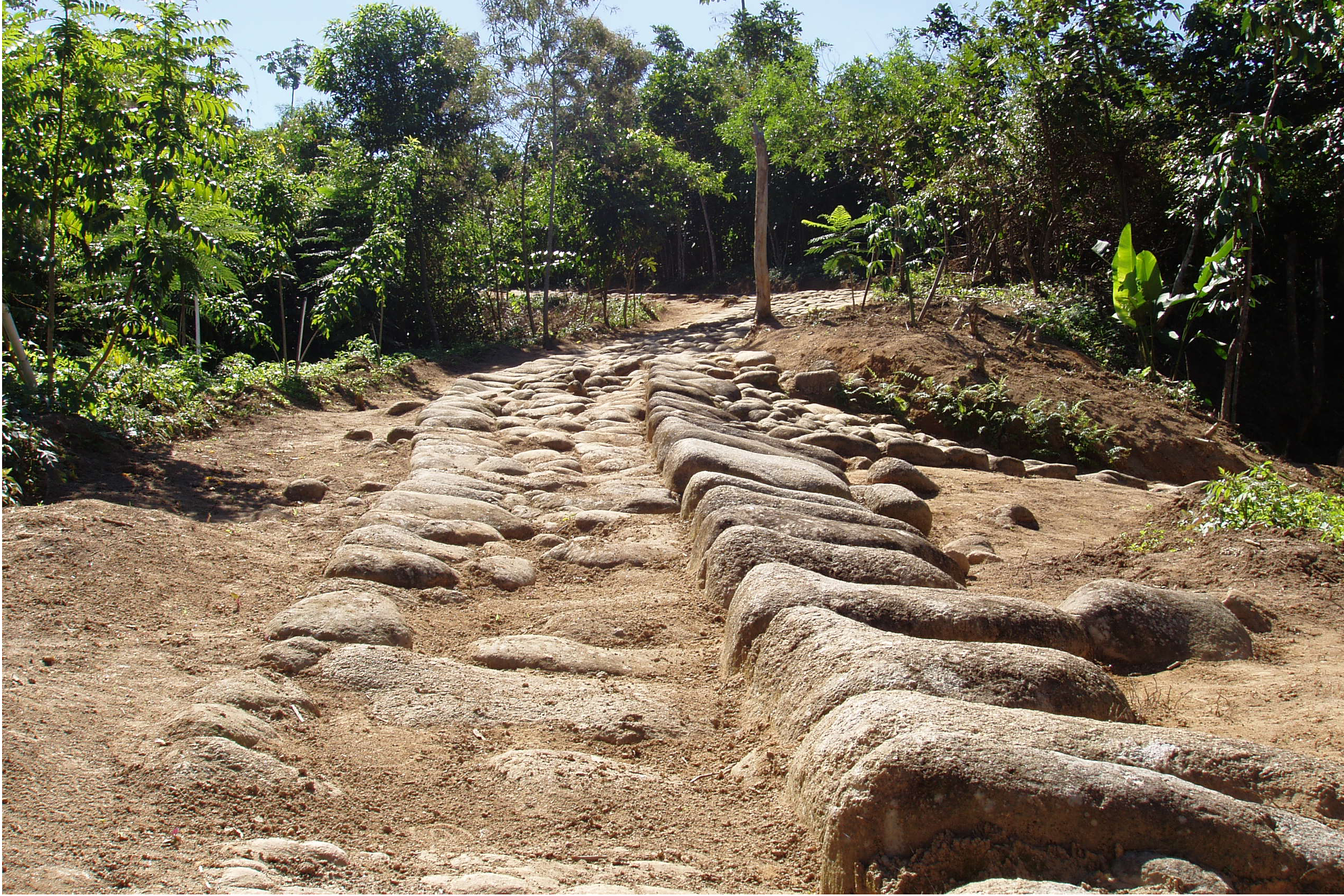
Stones on the Gold Trail

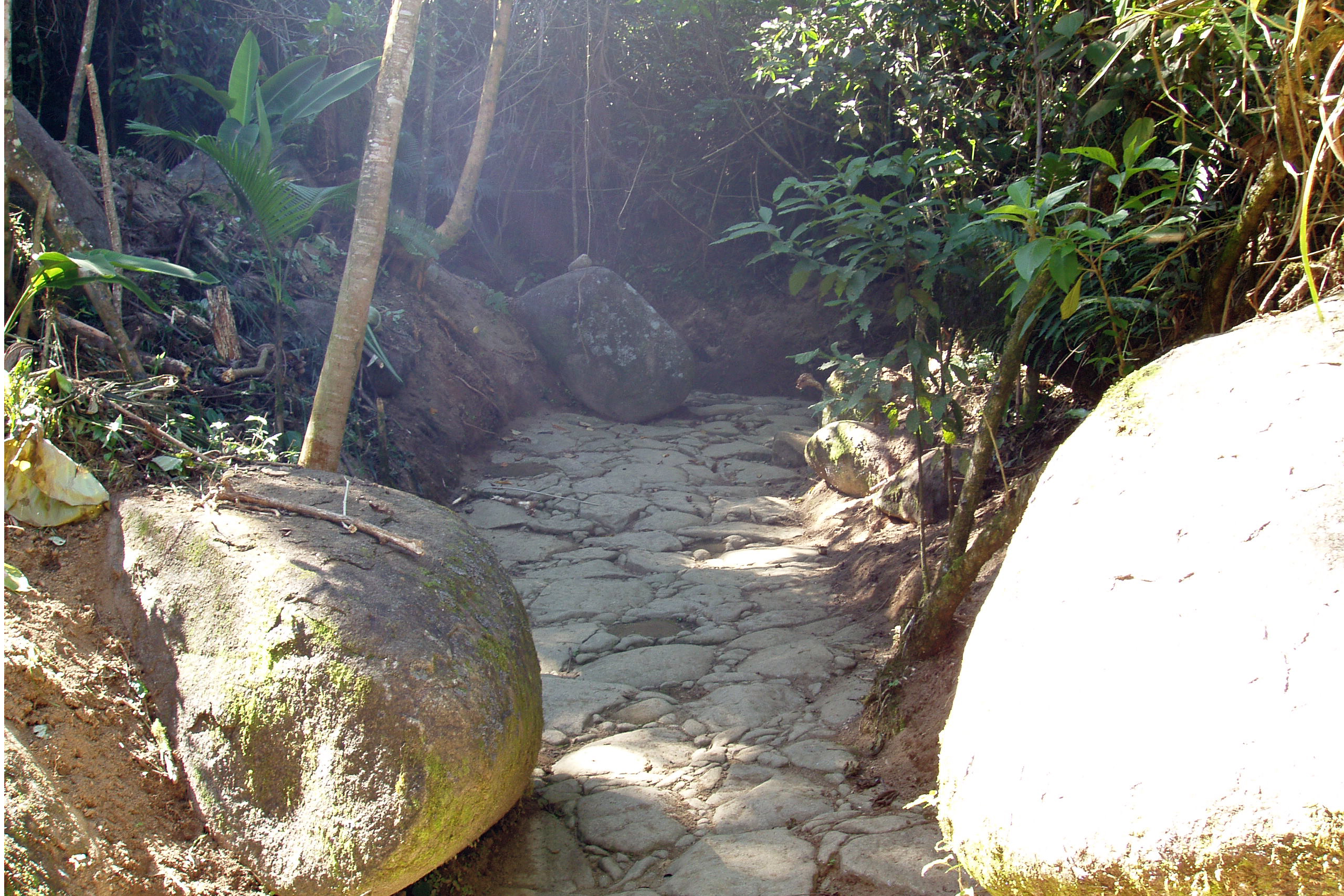
the Gold Trail

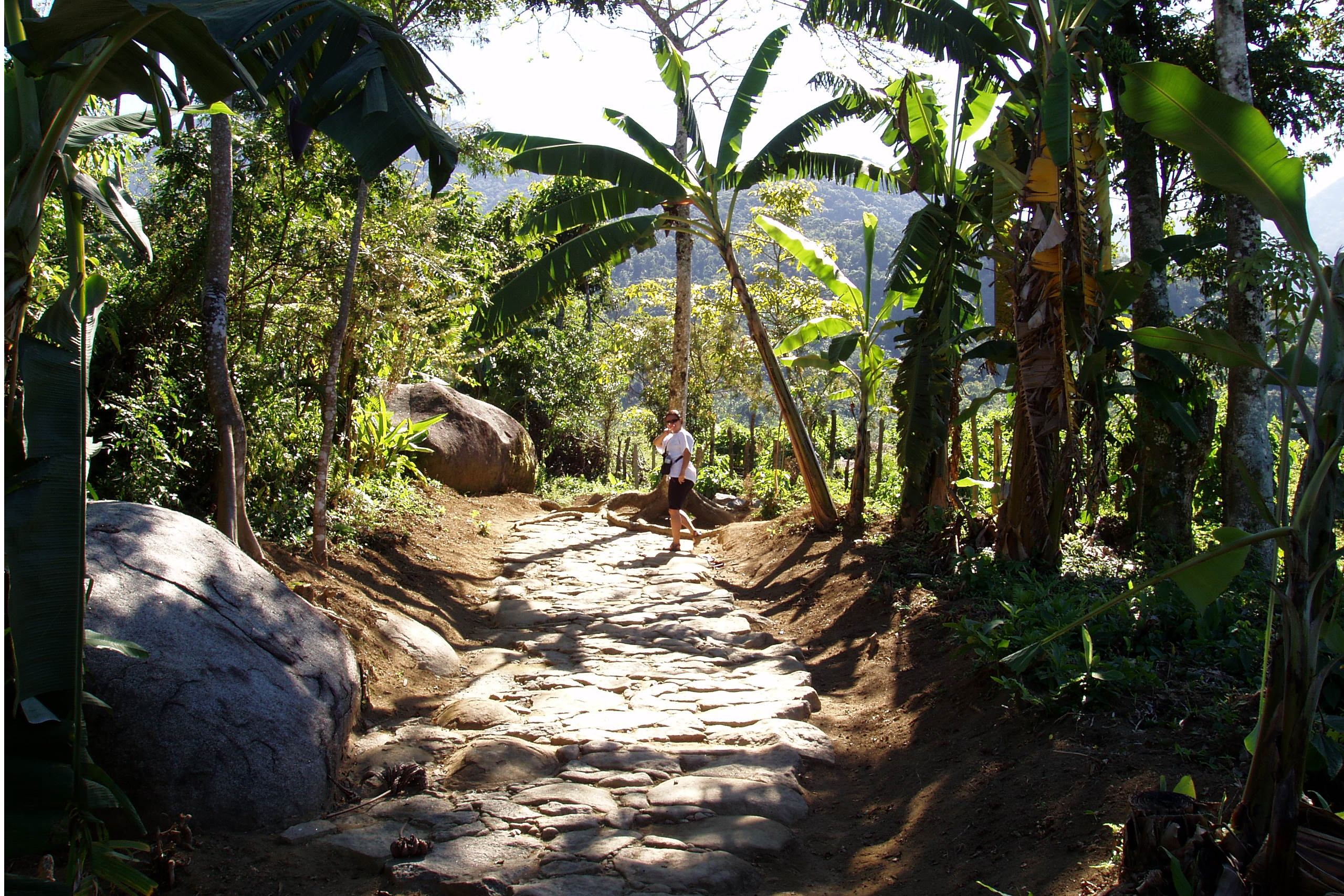
Hiking the Gold Trail

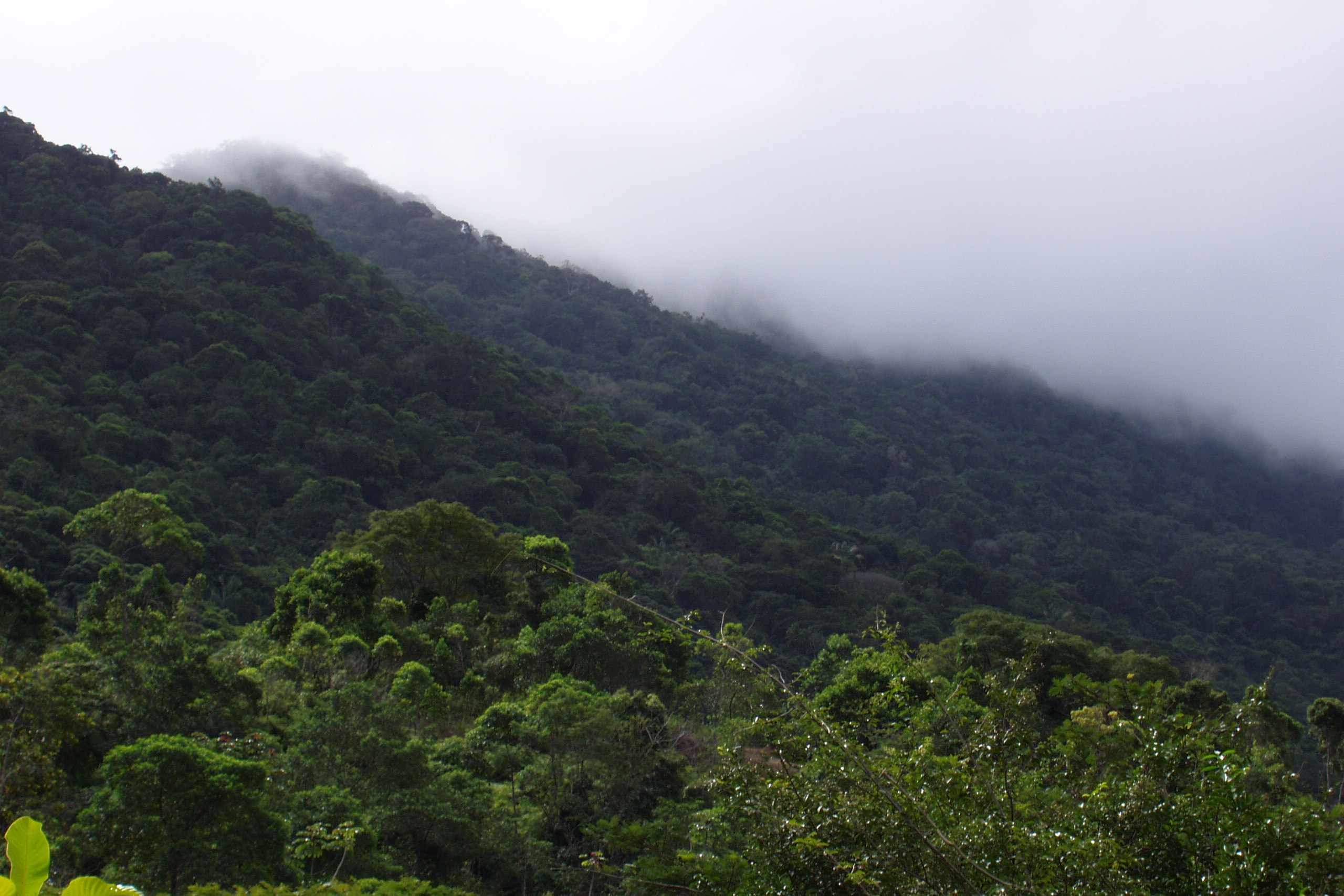
View from the Gold Trail

=== Cachaça ===
Before the gold mines came sugar cane, the products of which were the main exports of Brazil beginning around the 1500s. Under Portuguese occupation, most of the colony's regions were dedicated to the production of sugar, but Paraty remained focused on cachaça. This is most likely due to the more-humid climate, which resulted in a better mash. Cachaça, a spirit distilled from sugarcane juice, is the main ingredient in a caipirinha, the national drink of Brazil. Cachaça is said to be older than rum, as it has been made since the 1500s. Through the gold rush, cachaça remained an economic powerhouse in Paraty, widely demanded both in Brazil and in Europe. By 1820, over 150 cachaça stills were operating in the region. Over time, the production of cachaça became entwined with the identity of Paraty, and the "cachaça of Paraty" was awarded a Protected Indication of Provenance in 2007.

=== Economic revival ===
The city's economic activity revived as a port for a new boom, the coffee trade of the Paraiba do Sul River Valley in the early 19th century, until a railway along the valley created cheaper transport to the port of Rio de Janeiro. Since then, Paraty has been out of the mainstream, which is why it did not change for centuries, until a paved road was built from Rio de Janeiro to Santos, near São Paulo, in the 1970s. The city then began a new cycle of activity, which transformed a small, almost abandoned town living on very limited economic activity, mainly fishing and agriculture (bananas, manioc, sugarcane) into a tourism destination.

As of 2019, the historic town of Paraty has been listed as UNESCO World Heritage Site for its mixed cultural-natural landscape, encompassing its coastal historic center and nine natural areas.

== Architecture ==
Paraty is known for the cobblestone-paved streets throughout the Historic Center District. No cars or trucks are allowed in this part of town, only foot traffic or bicycles. Motor vehicles are only allowed in the Historic District on Wednesdays for deliveries. Horses and carts are a very common sight in Paraty and are frequently used all around the city.

Paraty has been able to maintain many of its historic buildings. Much of the architecture of the city has not changed for 250 years or more.

=== Churches ===
There are four important historic baroque churches in Paraty:

==== Chapel of Saint Rita ====
Capela de Santa Rita is the oldest church in Paraty. It was completed in 1722. This was the church of the freed slaves and freeman, former slaves. It is currently home to the Museum of Sacred Art.

==== Church of Nossa Senhora do Rosário e São Benedito ====
This church was built and used by Paraty's African slaves. It dates back to the year 1725. The church has a much simpler, more rustic style than the other three churches in Paraty. Every year in the first week of December the festivities of São Benedito are held in this church.

==== Chapel of Nossa Senhora das Dores ====
This chapel dates back to 1800. It was used mostly by the rich women of society. Construction was overseen by the presiding priest, Father Antonio Xavier da Silva Braga. The building was later renovated in 1901. The image of Nossa Senhora da Piedade was stolen from this chapel. It was finally recovered in the 1990s, and now can be seen at the Museum of Sacred Art in the Capela de Santa Rita.

==== Church of Nossa Senhora dos Remédios ====
Igreja Matriz Nossa Senhora dos Remédios is the largest church in Paraty. It takes up over an entire city block. Its construction began in 1646 when a woman named Maria Jácome de Melo donated the land for the construction of the village of Paraty, however she demanded two conditions: The first was the building of a chapel dedicated to Nossa Senhora dos Remédios and the second was that no one would harm the Indians that lived in the area at that time. The church was completed in 1873.

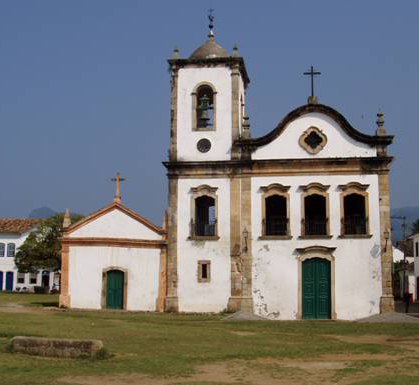
Capela de Santa Rita

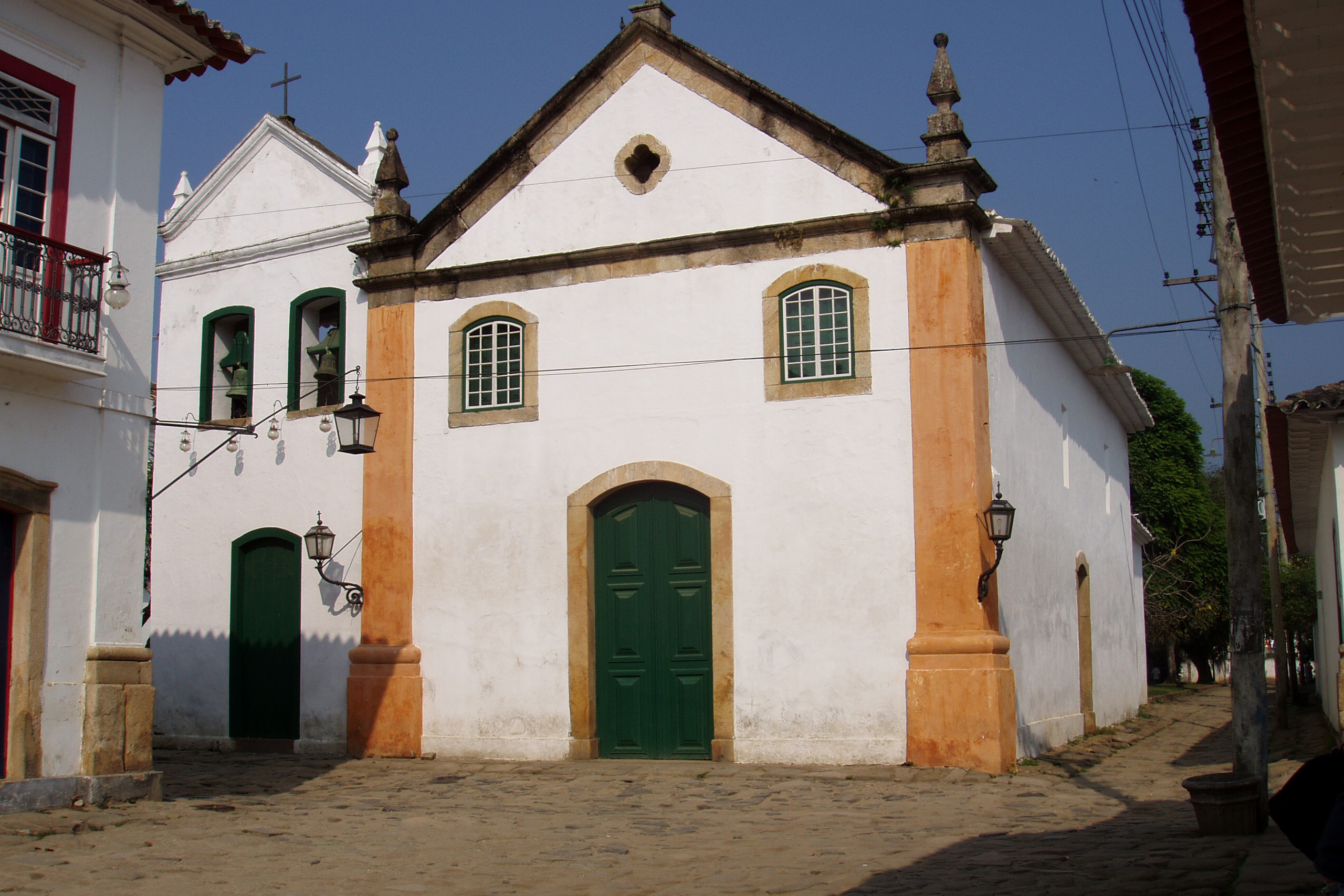
Igreja de Nossa Senhora do Rosário e São Benedito

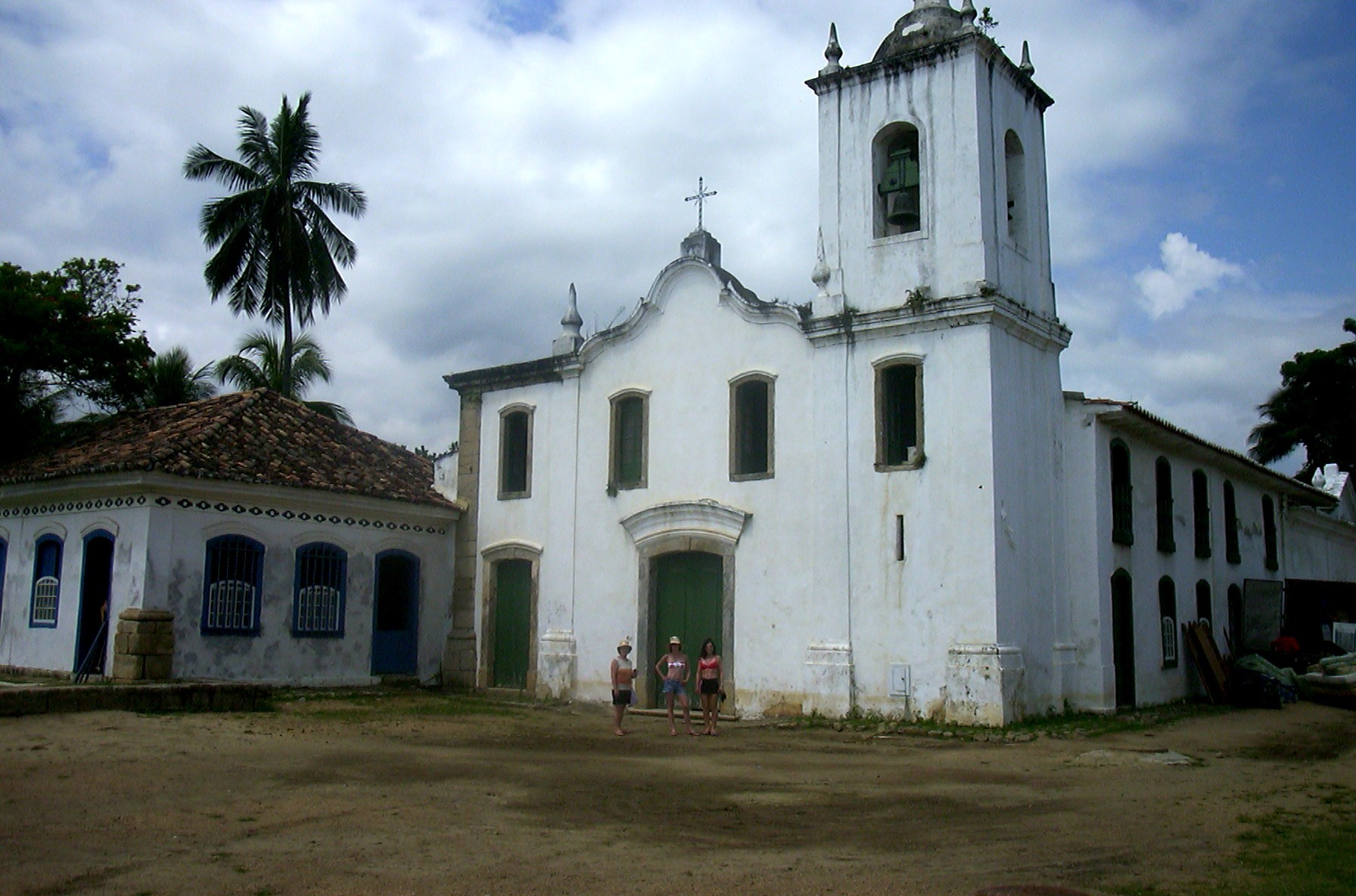
Capela de Nossa Senhora das Dores

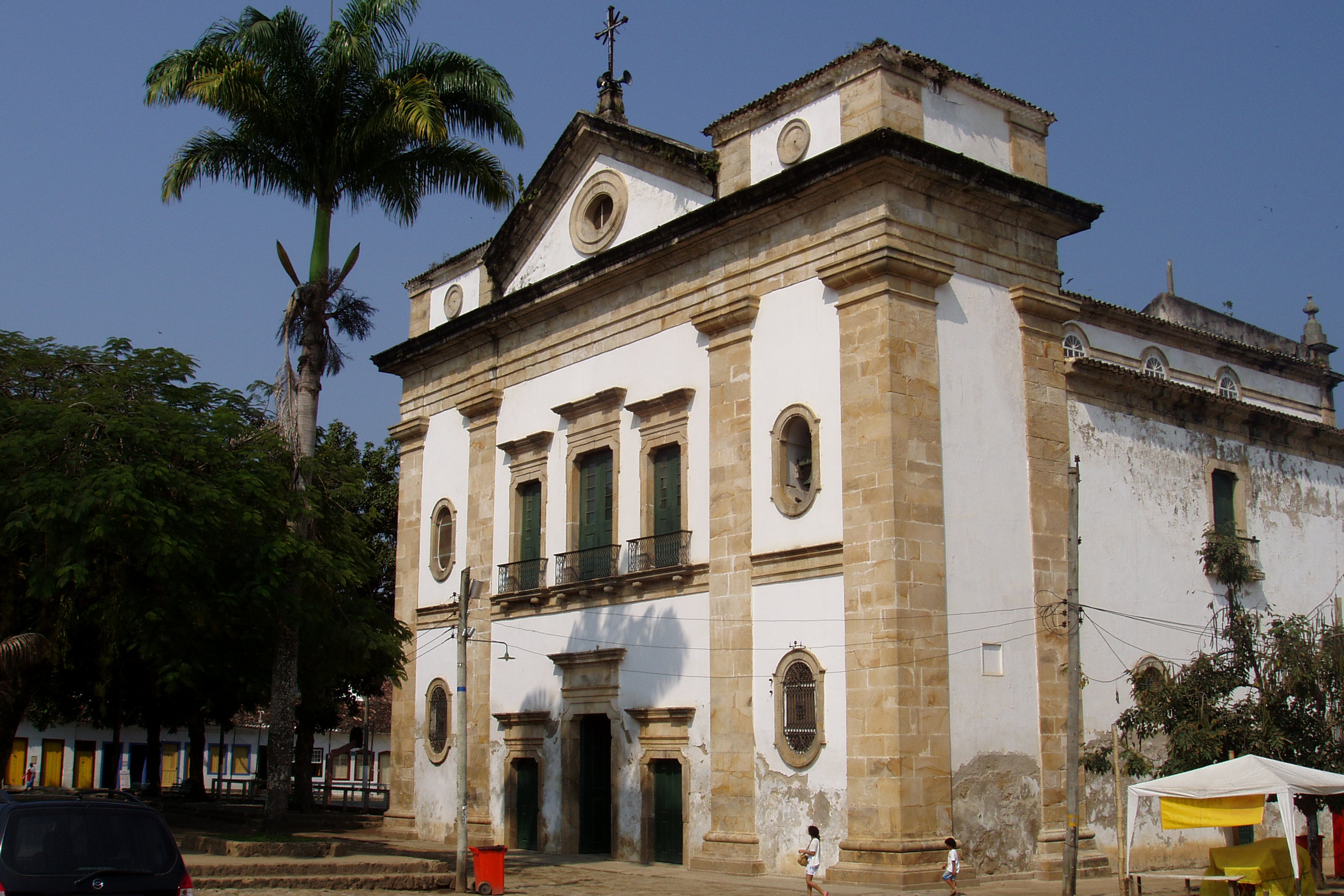
Igreja Matriz da Nossa Senhora dos Remédios

==== Chapel of the Generosa ====
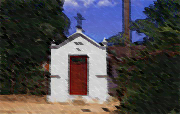
Capela da Generosa

Additionally, there is a very small chapel called Capela da Generosa which according to legend, was constructed in 1901 by the order of a generous female patron, in memory of Teodoro. Teodoro supposedly drowned in the river Perequê-Açu when he tried to fish on Good Friday, a day on which according to tradition it was not recommended to fish.

==== Chapel of Nossa Senhora da Conceição ====
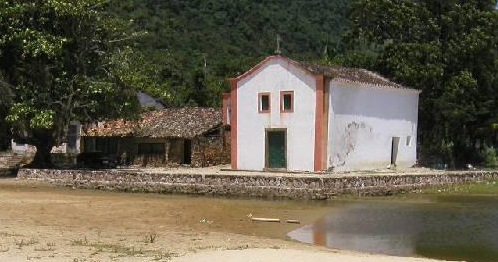
Capela Nossa Senhora da Conceição

There are also historical churches in two nearby small villages, Paraty Mirim and Penha.

Paraty-Mirim (Little Paraty) is the site of first chapel built by settlers in the region around Paraty (1686). At the time of its construction Paraty-Mirim an important commercial center and thriving village. Today however, all that remains there are the church itself and a scattering private homes. Although in recent years the tourist trade has grown there due to the pristine beaches in the area and Paraty-Mirim now has a few small inns, a couple of restaurant/bars and offers boat tours.

==== Church of Nossa Senhora da Penha ====
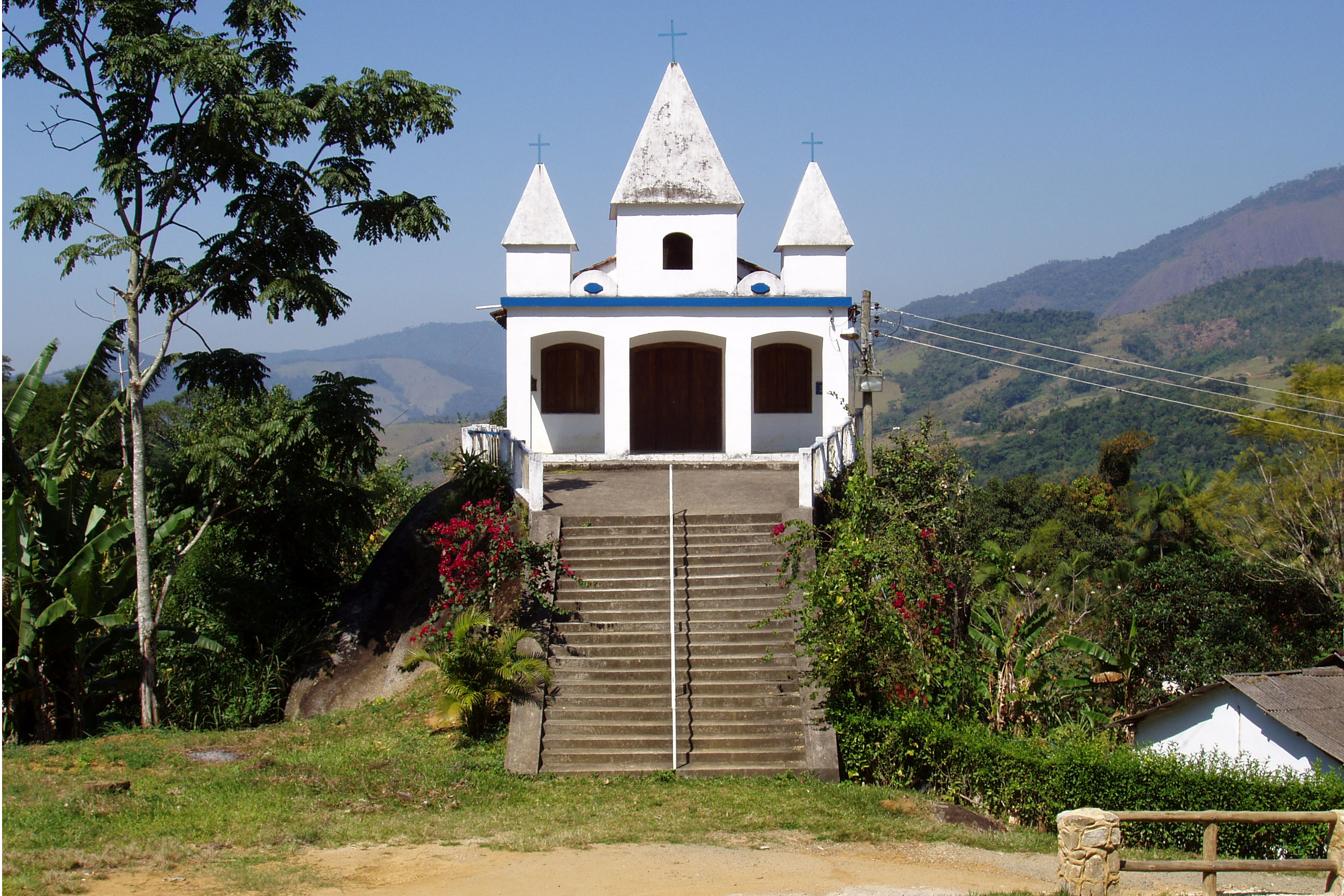
Igreja de Nossa Senhora da Penha

This church is unique in that it was built on top of a huge boulder in the small hamlet of Penha, just outside Paraty. The church is located directly across from the Tourist Information Center at the trail-head of the Caminho do Ouro.

=== Forts ===
There are two colonial forts in Paraty: Forte Defensor and Forte Patitiba.

==== Forte Defensor ====
Forte Defensor was built in 1703 and outfitted with six cannons for the protection of the city's important commercial warehouses. With the aforementioned economic decline of the region, it was in ruins until 1822, when it was reconstructed and dedicated to Emperor Dom Pedro I. Some historians believe that it was at the fort that the first nucleus of the town began, in that the area around the fort is still referred to as the "Old Village."

Ruins of the old defensive stone walls together with the cannons can still be seen today. It is also home to a powder house for storing explosives – one of the few still existing in Brazil. Forte Defensor is one of seven fortifications that were built around the harbor of Paraty, two of them being in the city. All of the others that were constructed outside the city are now only ruins.

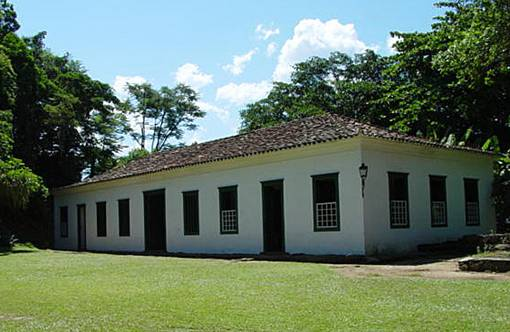
Forte Defensor

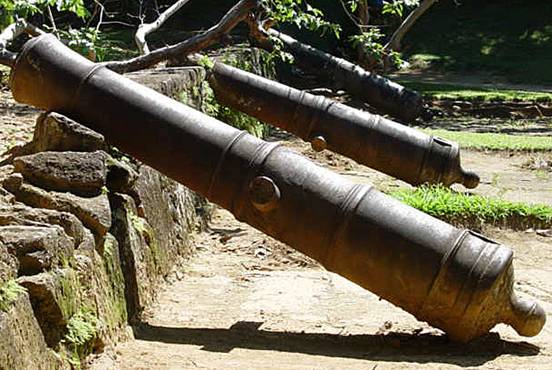
Cannons at Forte Defensor

==== Forte Patitiba [Cadeia Antiga] ====
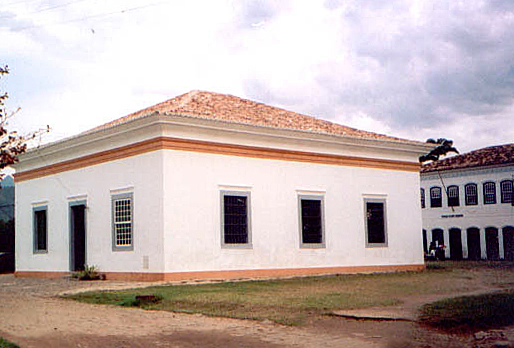
Forte Patitiba

What is left of this fort, also known as Cadeia Antiga (the Old Jail), is a smallish structure which for a while was also used as a prison. It is found in the plaza of Santa Rita, next to the church of same name. Constructed in the beginning of the 18th century, the building was part of a larger Forte Patitiba, the other blockhouse built in the city for defense of the harbor. In the 19th century it was decommissioned and today it houses the local public library.

There are also many colorful colonial houses (refurbished in most cases), many of which have been transformed into shops, pousadas (Brazilian bed-and-breakfasts), restaurants and bars.

=== Flooded Streets ===
Once a month when there is a full moon and the tide is high, seawater rises above its normal levels and pours into the Historic Center District through special openings in the seawalls that separate the city from the harbor. The streets are only flooded for a short time until the tide recedes. The water is usually only 6 to 10 inches (15 to 25 cm) deep, and a few merchants near the seawall put out small bridges to span the flooded streets for the benefit of pedestrians. This routine flooding is supposed to help clean the cobblestone streets.

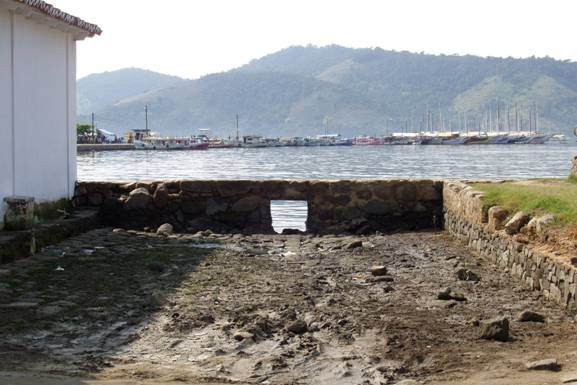
Dry Flood-hole

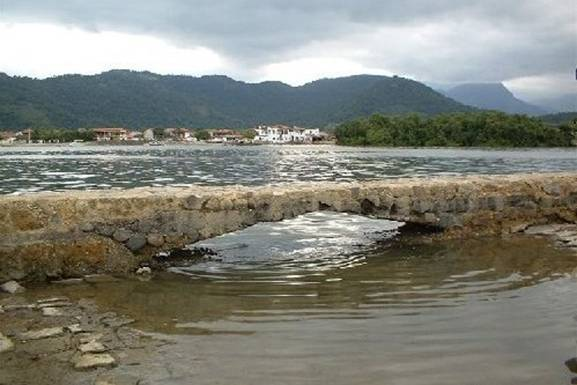
Flood by incoming tide

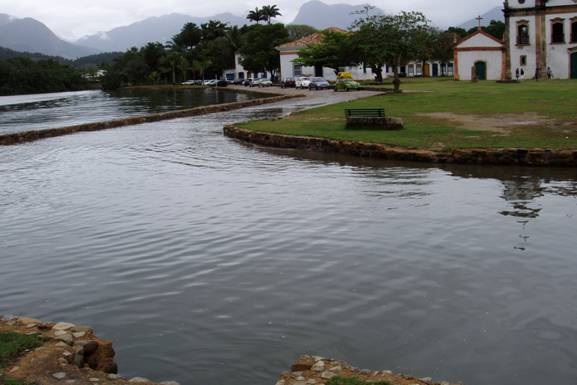
Flooding street

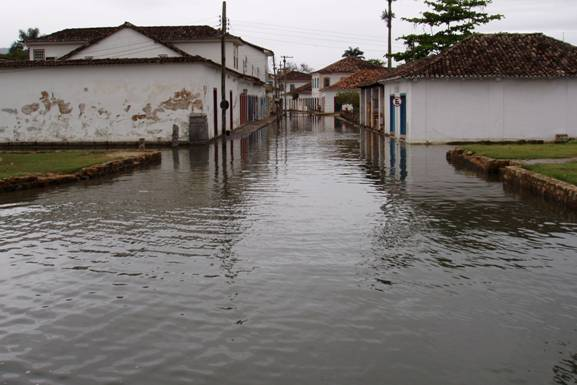
Another flooding street

== Neighborhoods ==
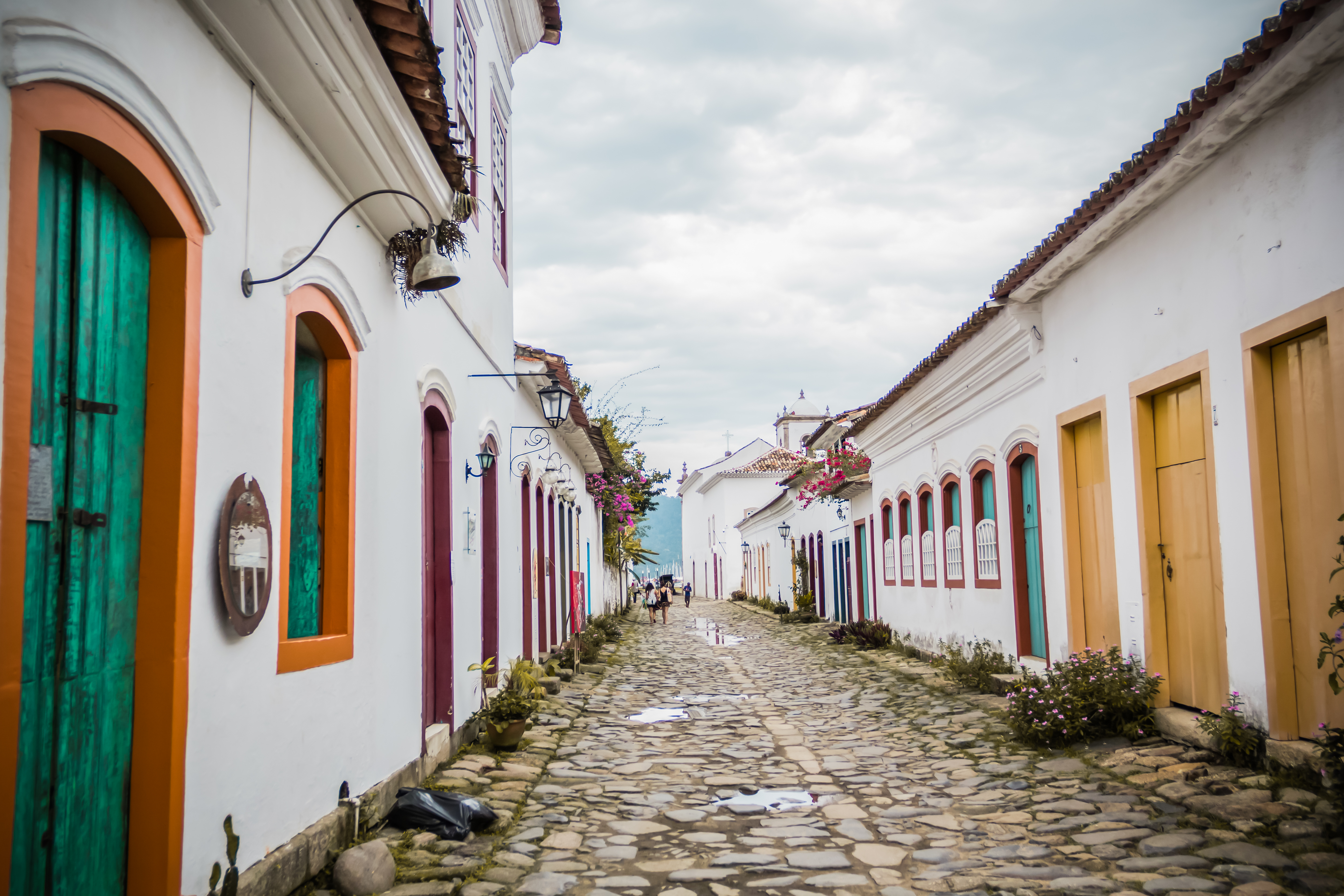
A street in the historic center of Paraty

Paraty is divided into 12 neighborhoods. They are as follows:

- Caboré
- Centro Historico
- Fátima
- Ilha das Cobras
- Jabaquara
- Mangueira
- Parque Imperial
- Parque Ypê
- Patitiba
- Portal de Paraty
- Saudade
- Vila Colonial

The municipality contains the Paraty-Mirim State Park, created in 1972. It contains part of the Tamoios Ecological Station.

== Culture and tourism ==
Tourism in Paraty combines the municipality's cultural heritage with coastal and nature-based activities. The Bay of Paraty contains about 50 beaches, many of which are accessible only by boat, while its sheltered waters are used for sailing, kayaking and snorkelling. Inland, trails and waterfalls in the Atlantic Forest provide opportunities for hiking and ecotourism, complementing visits to the historic centre.

There are many musical and cultural events, the most prominent of which is the FLIP – Festa Literaria Internacional de Paraty (International Literary Festival of Paraty). The town is also known for its local festivals on Catholic holy dates, such as the Feast of the Holy Ghost.

The annual Paraty Bourbon Jazz Festival has occurred every May since 2009. The traditional music event has already brought names like Stanley Jordan, Gary Brown, Ed Motta, Leo Gandelman, Eumir Deodato, Joshua Redman, Pau Brasil Group, Dianne Reaves, Mike Stern, Naná Vasconcellos, Nuno Mindelis, Jacques Morelenbaum, Stanley Clarke, and many other leading names in jazz, blues, soul and R & B from Brazil and the world.

The event usually has two stages, located in the Plaza de Matriz and the Santa Rita Church in the historic center of the city, as well as buskers (street performers) and Orleans Street Jazz Band circling the streets of the Historic Center and DJ Crizz that opens and closes programming every day.

The Casa da Cultura Paraty (Paraty House of Culture) occupies an historic house originally built in 1754 which opened to the public in 2004 and holds a permanent exhibition on local history and culture. In the Salon of Indigenous Culture, visitors can see the "carpets" made of colored sawdust and flower petals used during the festival of Corpus Christi in June. The largest is almost 92 square feet (8.5 m^{2}). The "carpet" is protected by glass so that visitors walk on it as they enter.

Paraty played the part of the Bahian town of Ilhéus in the 1983 Bruno Barreto film Gabriela, Cravo e Canela, starring Sônia Braga and Marcello Mastroianni.

Paraty was also the set for Isle Esme (the place of Edward and Bella's honeymoon) in the movie The Twilight Saga: Breaking Dawn.

== Transportation ==
Paraty airport can be reached from Rio de Janeiro or São Paulo by chartered helicopter or small commercial and private aircraft because presently it has no scheduled flights.

Another possibility of transport is to arrive by sea by way of a sailboat or cruise ship from Rio de Janeiro, Angra dos Reis and Ilha Grande.

Paraty is connected by road to Rio de Janeiro or São Paulo (via road BR-101). Air-conditioned buses leave to go back and forth from Rio to Paraty and Paraty to Rio.

=== Distance from other Brazilian cities ===
- Angra dos Reis – 95 km
- Belo Horizonte – 572 km
- Caraguatatuba – 126 km
- Rio de Janeiro – 236 km
- São Paulo – 330 km
- Ubatuba – 74 km

== Other images ==
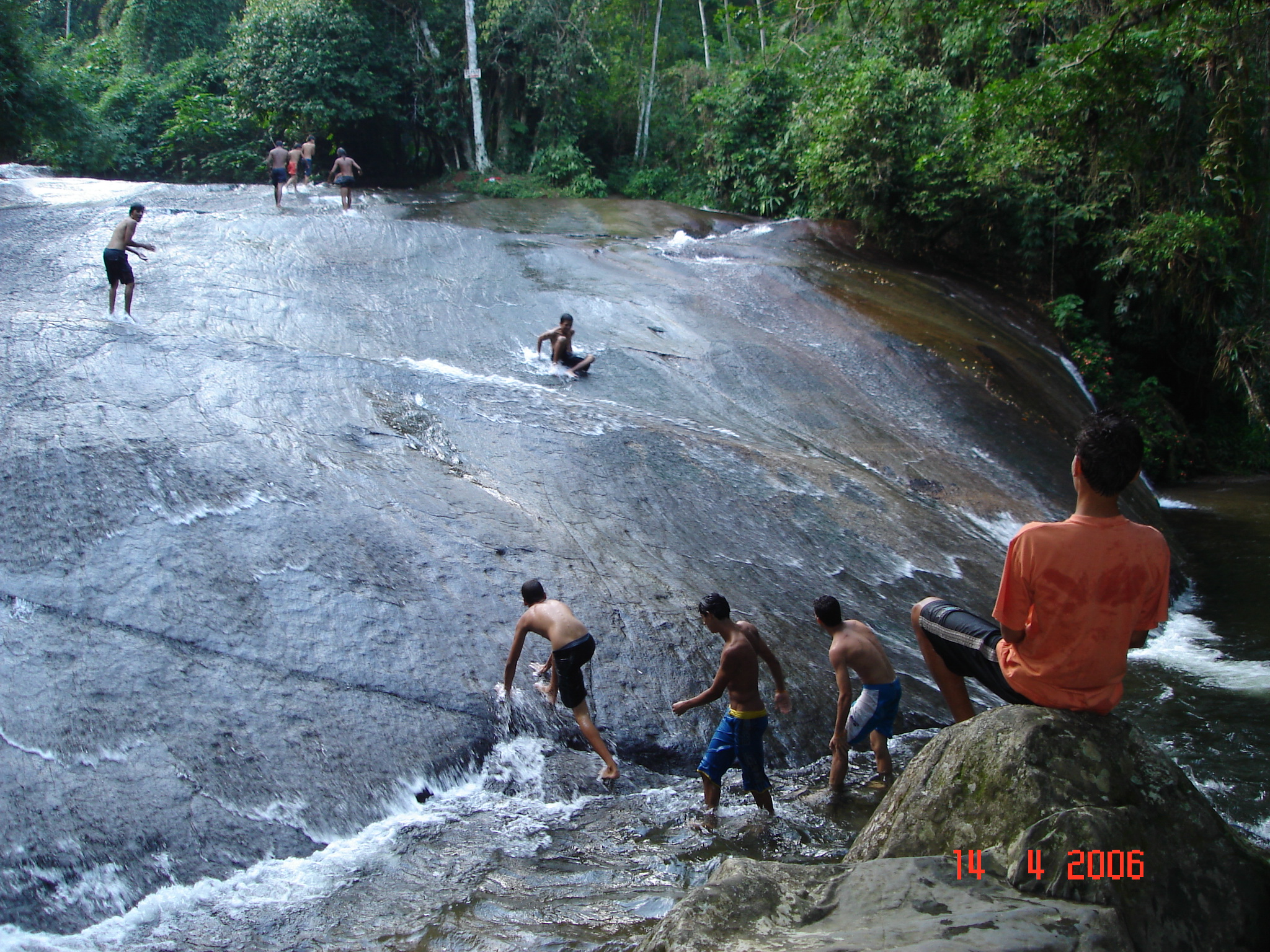
Penha

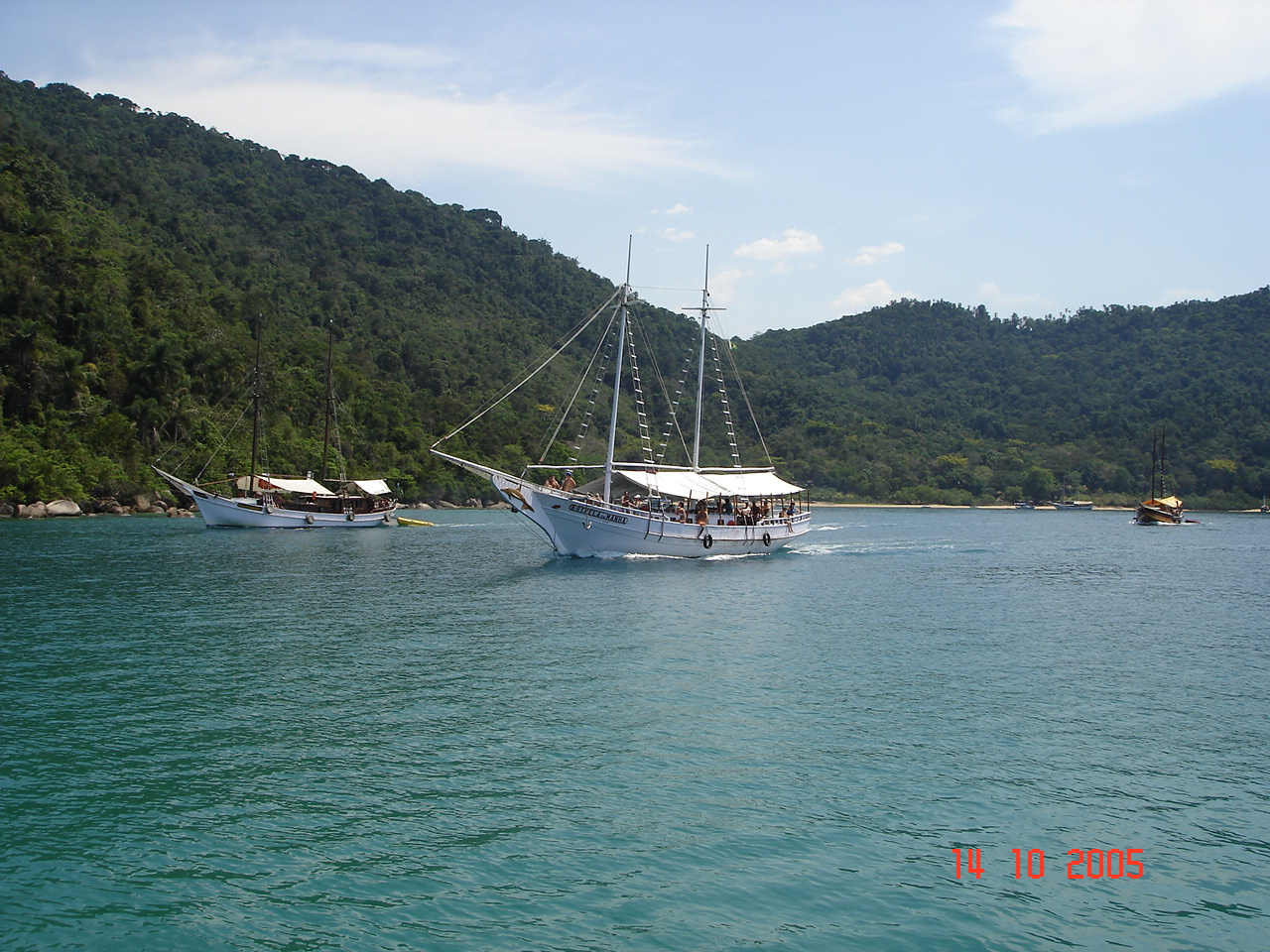
Saveiro in Ilha Comprida

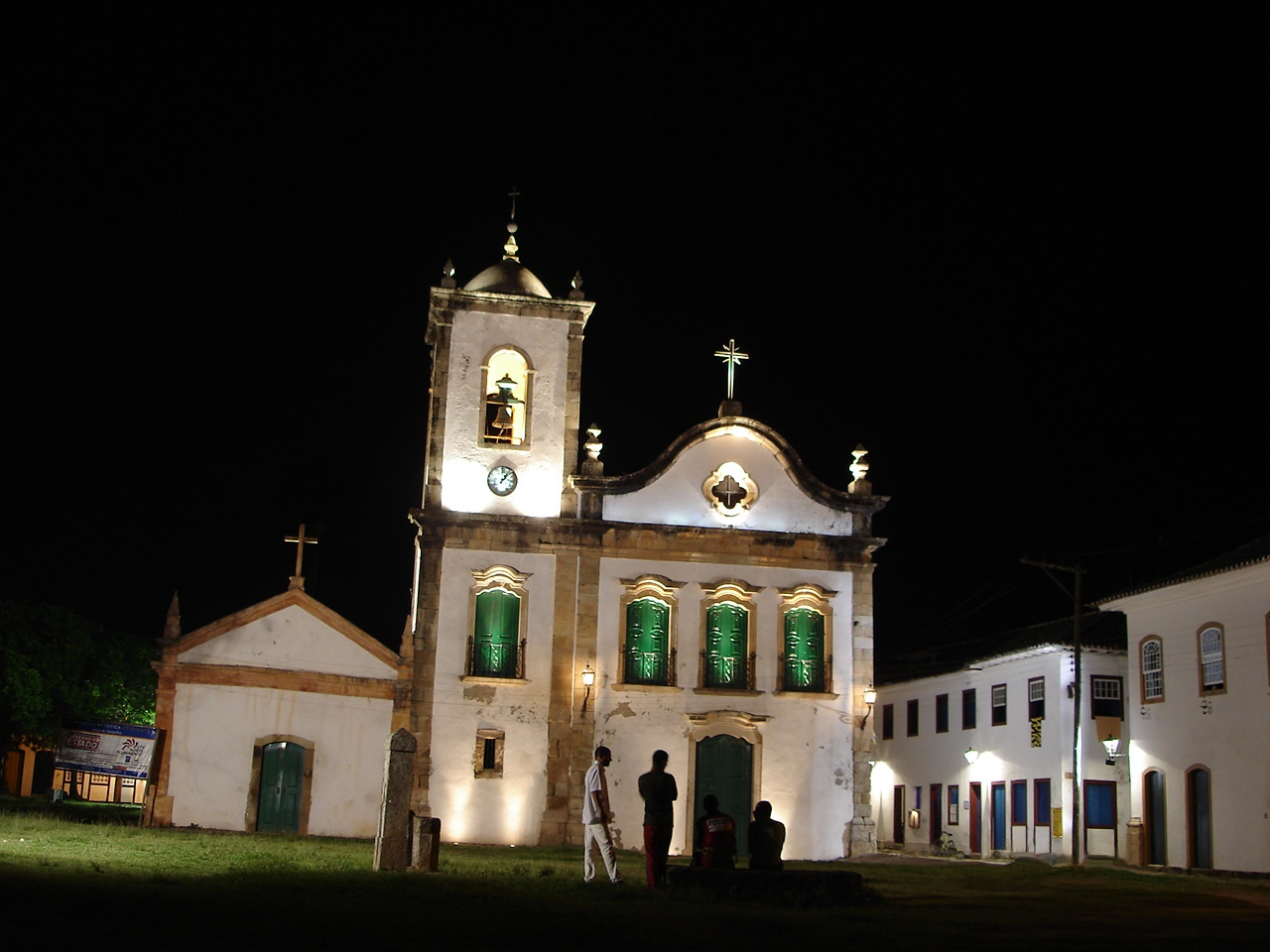
Colonial Church

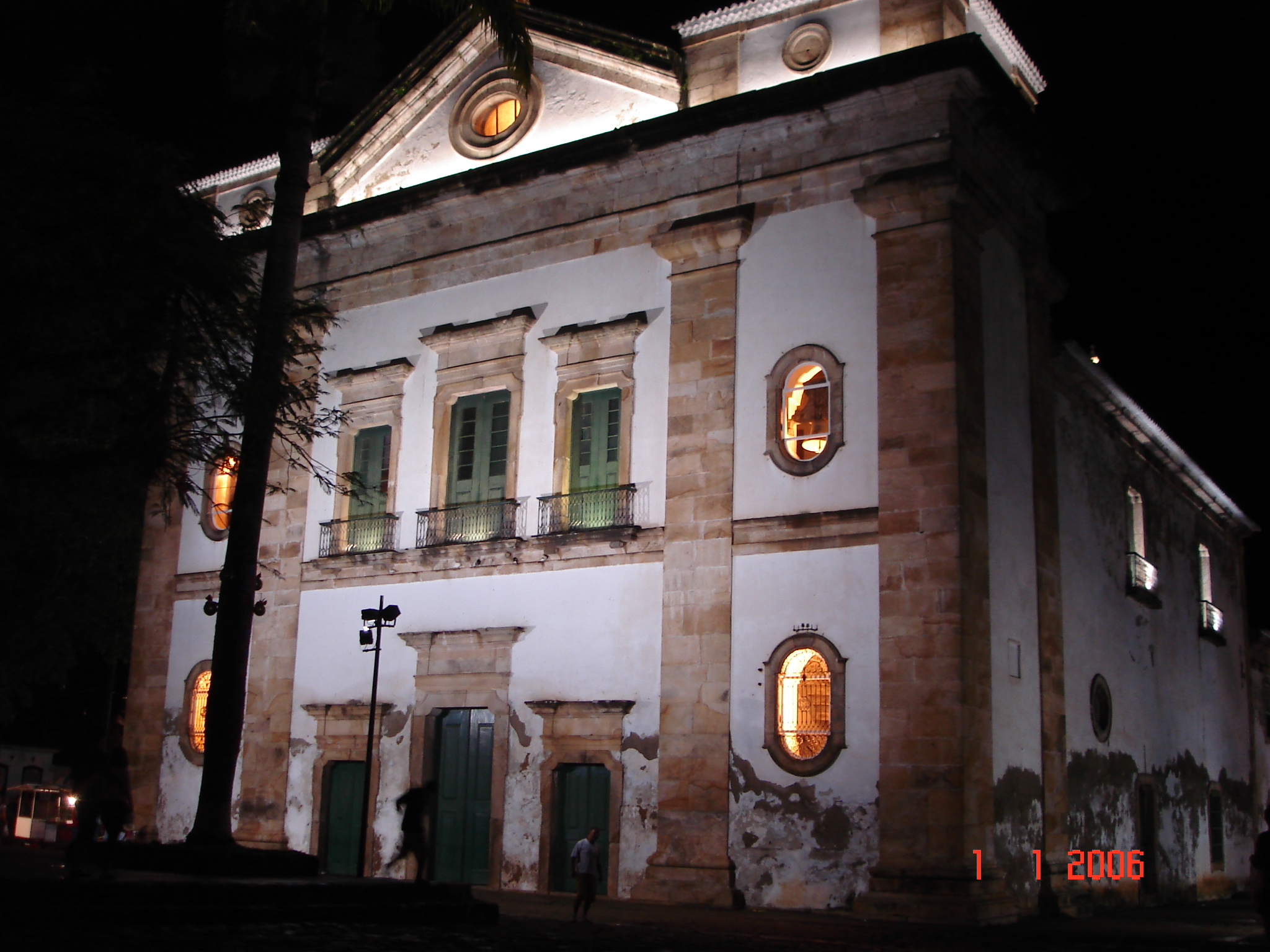
Colonial Church

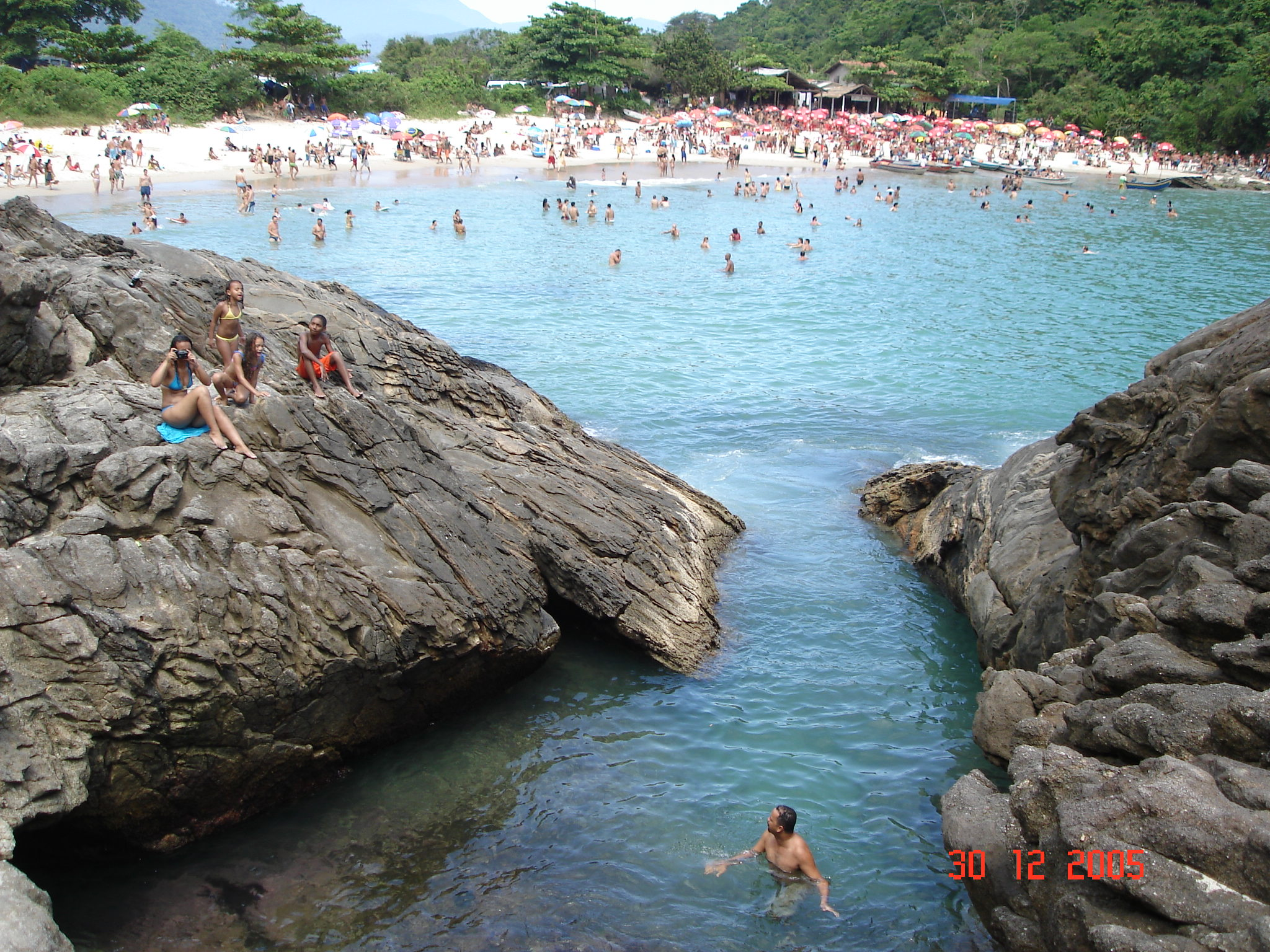
Trindade district

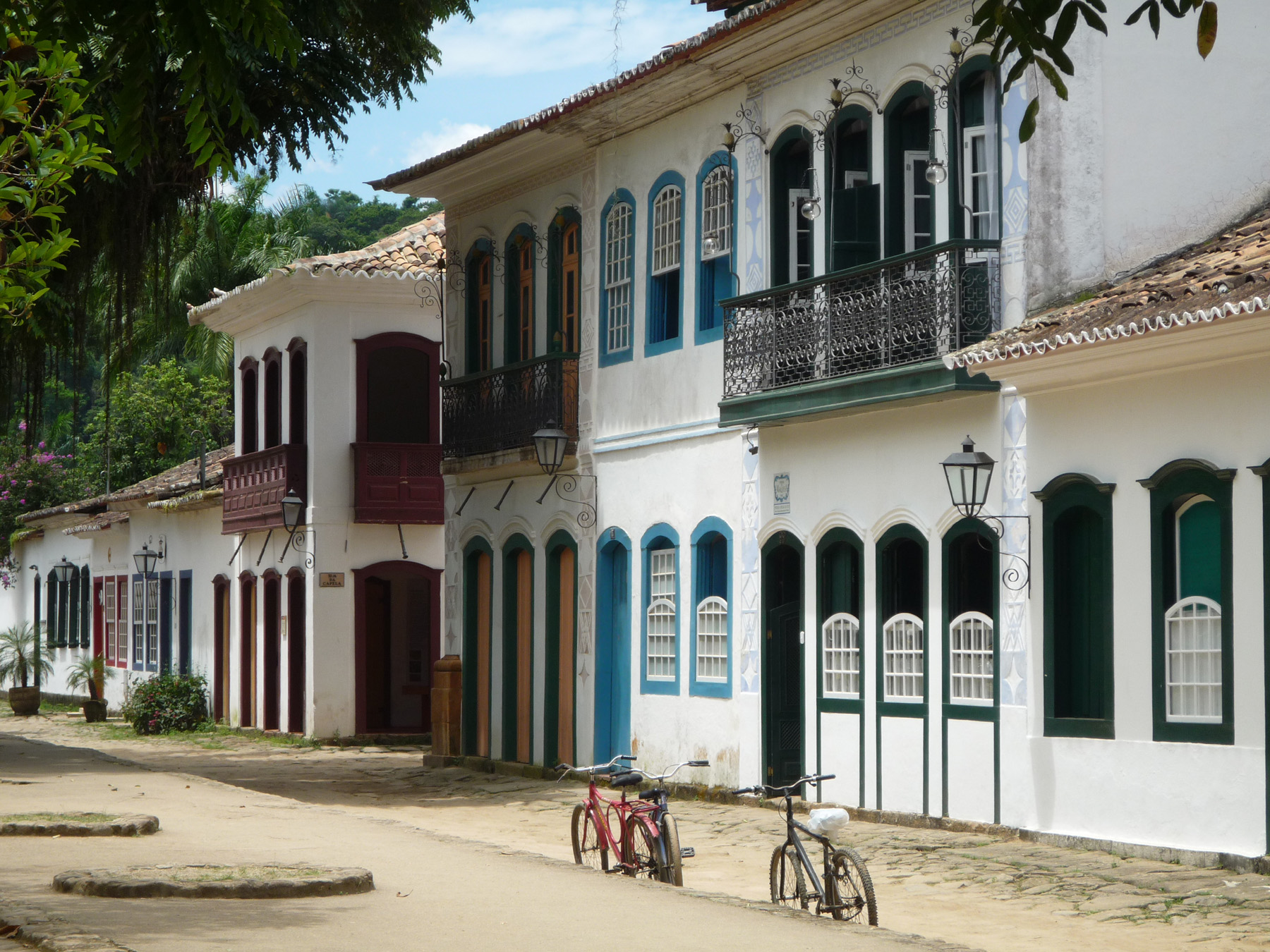
Paraty street
