= Sobrado, Paraíba =

Coordinates: 7°08′38″S 35°14′20″W

- Municipality
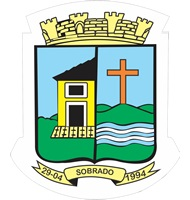
- Coat of arms
- Interactive map of Sobrado, Paraíba
- Country: Brazil
- Region: Northeast
- State: Paraíba
- Mesoregion: Mata Paraibana

Population (2020)
  - Total: 7,815
- Time zone: UTC−3 (BRT)

Sobrado, Paraíba is a municipality in the state of Paraíba in the Northeast Region of Brazil.

== See also ==
- List of municipalities in Paraíba
