= Sobrado =

Sobrado may refer to:

- Sobrado (architecture), a Portuguese colonial house style

== Places ==
Brazil:

- Sobrado, Paraíba, municipality in the state of Paraíba in the Northeast Region

Spain:

- Sobrado, Galicia, municipality in the province of A Coruña, Galicia
  - Sobrado Abbey, more commonly known as Sobrado dos Monxes or Santa María de Sobrado, located in Sobrado, Galicia
- Sobrado, León, municipality in the province of León, Castile and León
- Sobrado (Tineo), a civil parish in Tineo, Asturias

Portugal:

- Sobrado (Castelo de Paiva)
- Sobrado (Valongo)
- Sobradelo da Goma
