= Alto Ribeira Tourist State Park =

State park in São Paulo, Brazil

- Parque Estadual Turístico do Alto Ribeira
- IUCN category II (national park)
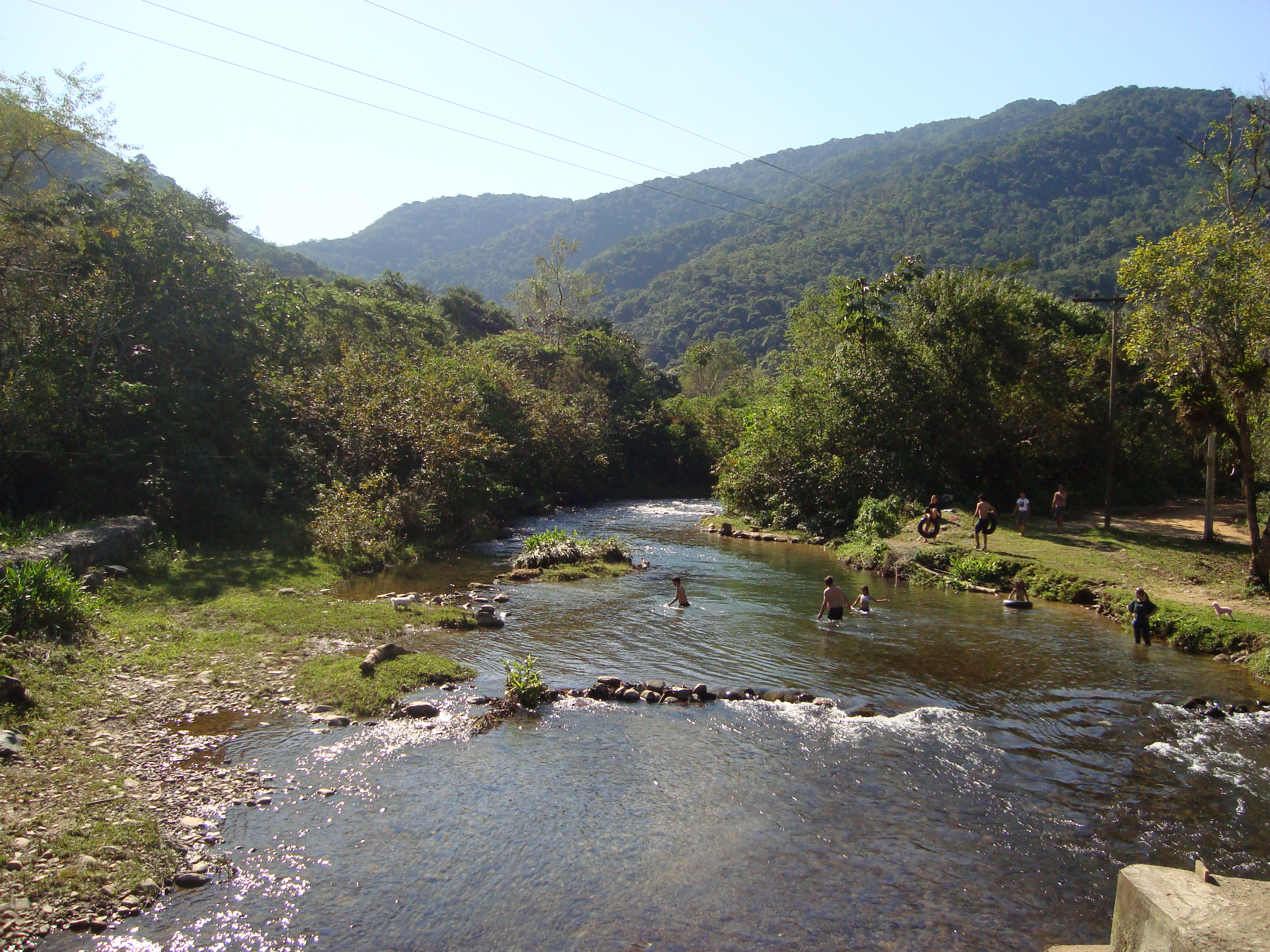
- Rio Betari

- Location within Brazil
- Location: São Paulo, Brazil
- Nearest city: Iporanga in São Paulo
- Coordinates: 24.46°S 48.6°W
- Area: 35,712 hectares (88,250 acres)
- Designation: State park
- Created: 19 May 1958
- Website: www.petar.com.br

The Alto Ribeira Tourist State Park (Portuguese: Parque Estadual Turístico do Alto Ribeira) is a state park in the state of São Paulo, Brazil. It protects a mountainous area of Atlantic Forest and is known for its many caves.

== Location ==
Paranapiacaba ecological continuum

The Alto Ribeira Tourist State Park is divided between the municipalities of Apiaí and Iporanga in the state of São Paulo, lying 320 kilometres (200 mi) away from the city of São Paulo. It has over 350 caves, many waterfalls, trails and archaeological and paleontological sites. There are traditional and quilombola communities in the park. There are four visitor centers and support for enforcement activities and research in order to safeguard and protect the rich natural heritage of the upper Ribeira region, represented by the important biodiversity of the remnants of the Atlantic Forest and its paleontological, archaeological, and historical sites. It is home to one of the most important speleological provinces in Brazil with more than 300 caves registered by the SBE - Sociedade Brasileira de Espeleologia.

== History ==
The Alto Ribeira Tourist State Park is one of the oldest parks in the state of São Paulo, created by state decree 32,283 of 19 May 1958. From the 1990s it became popular for adventure sports such as climbing, rafting and cycling and for environmental education, photography and observation of nature.

São Paulo state decree 58.148 of 21 June 2012 created the Paranapiacaba Conservation Units Mosaic, consisting of the Alto Ribeira Tourist State Park, Intervales State Park, Carlos Botelho State Park, Xitué Ecological Station, Nascentes do Paranapanema State Park and the Serra do Mar Environmental Protection Area in the municipalities of Eldorado, Sete Barras, Tapiraí, Juquiá, Ribeirão Grande and Capão Bonito. The purpose was to promote integrated and participatory management of the conservation units, and to seek to guarantee conservation of the areas covered.

== Environment ==
There are a great many streams and rivers. Flora include the Palmito Juçara (Euterpe edulis) and many species of bromeliads and orchids. Bird species include fasciated tiger heron (Tigrisoma fasciatum) and ornate hawk-eagle (Spizaetus ornatus). Large mammals include lowland paca (Cuniculus paca), South American tapir (Tapirus terrestris) and howler monkeys.

== Facilities ==
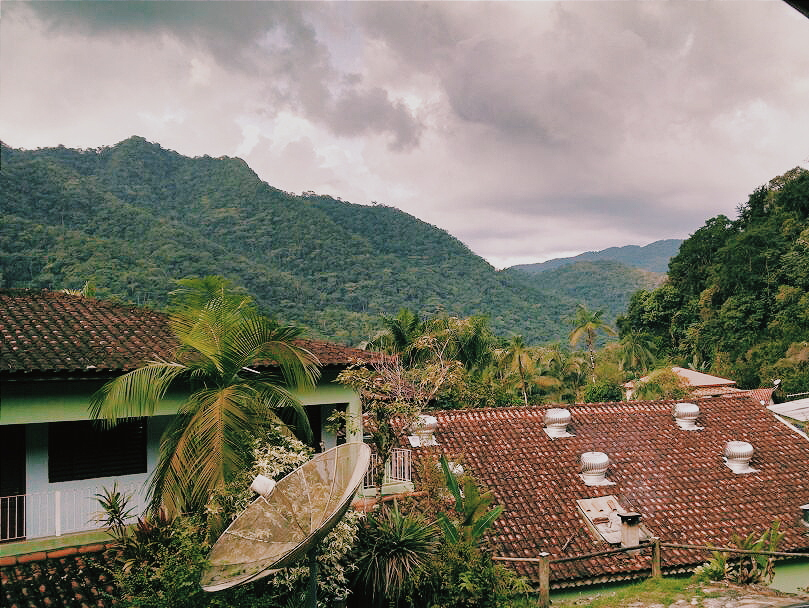
View of the park from a local inn

The park has four visitor centers. Most tours of the parks require a local guide. The Ouro Grosso center is a base for courses on environmental monitoring, seminars and meetings and provides accommodation for public school students. Other than the caves, attractions include:

- Nucleo Santana
  - Cachoeira Andorinhas
  - Cachoeira Beija Flor
  - Cachoeira Couto
- Nucleo Ouro Grosso
  - Cachoeira Arapongas
- Nucleo Caboclos
  - Cachoeira Maximiliano
  - Cachoeira 07 Reis
- Nucleo Casa de Pedra
  - Canyon Castelo

== Caves ==
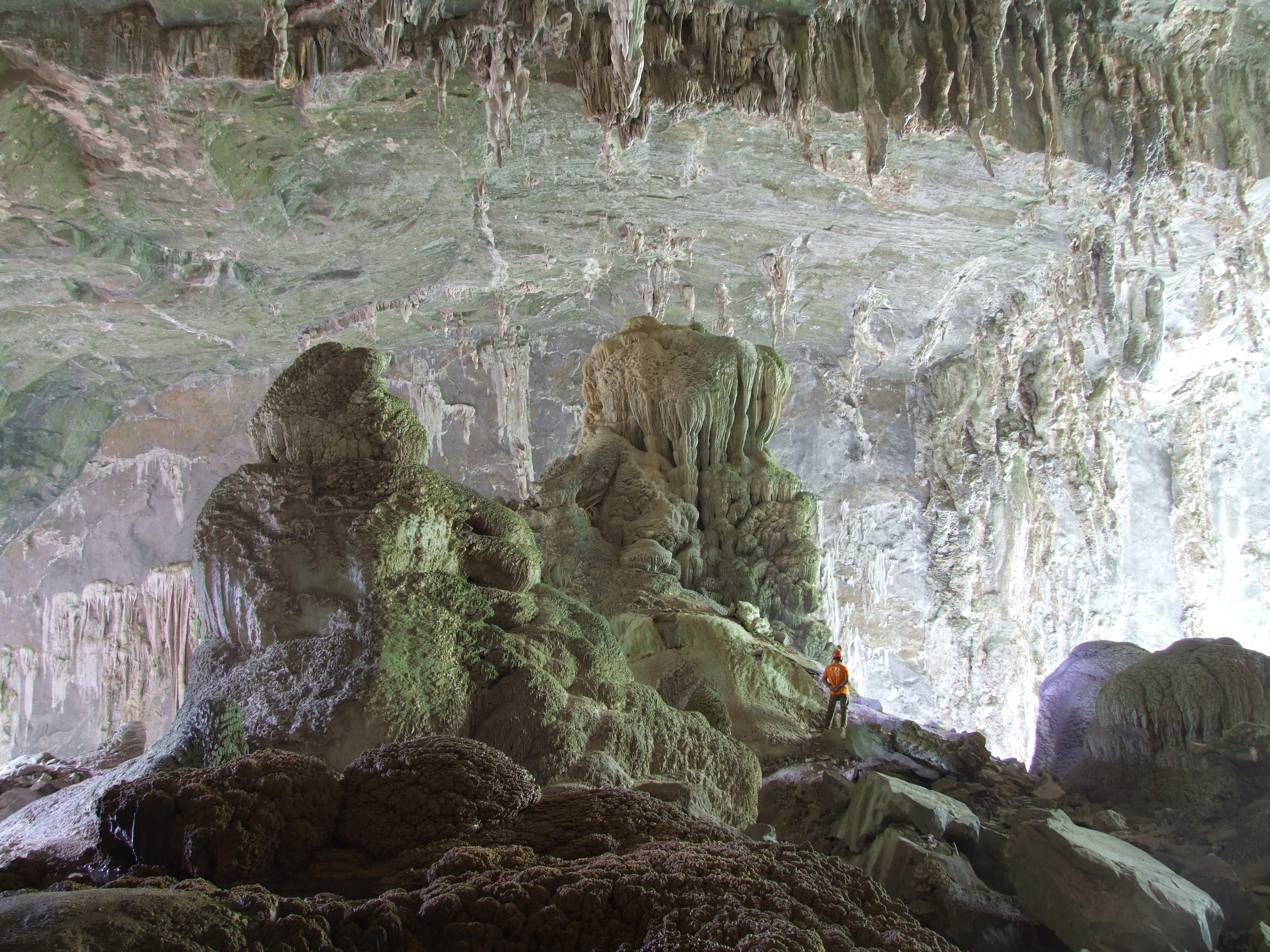
Caverna de Santana

The caves are the main attraction. Some have stairs, walkways and bridges to facilitate access, some contain large rivers. Only four are open to visitors.

Its location in the Atlantic Forest encourages visitors to explore a variety of environments, including rivers, waterfalls, and caves. Its wide range of itineraries may please the most demanding of both beginners and veterans. It has four main areas or units for tourist visitation: Nucleo Santana, Ouro Grosso, Casa de Pedra and Caboclos. The most frequented are Santana and Ouro Grosso.

=== Nucleo Santana ===
- Caverna de Santana is the most visited cave of the State of São Paulo. Rich in formations and labyrinths it consists of a mesh of galleries in three levels, then only two superimposed, through which the Roncador river flows. Part of this cave is easily accessible, with wooden stairs and bridges built in the difficult crossing points. Another can be visited only with the help of highly skilled guides. Finally, a third part is accessible only to specialists and with prior authorization.
- Caverna da Água Suja is essentially composed of an underground river, which receives two tributaries. Its entrance has very high ceiling and width of approximately 10 meters. On the road connecting the towns of Apiaí and Iporanga a path leads to the parking area of the park 1.2 km ahead. Visit only with permission. Tickets at the entrance.

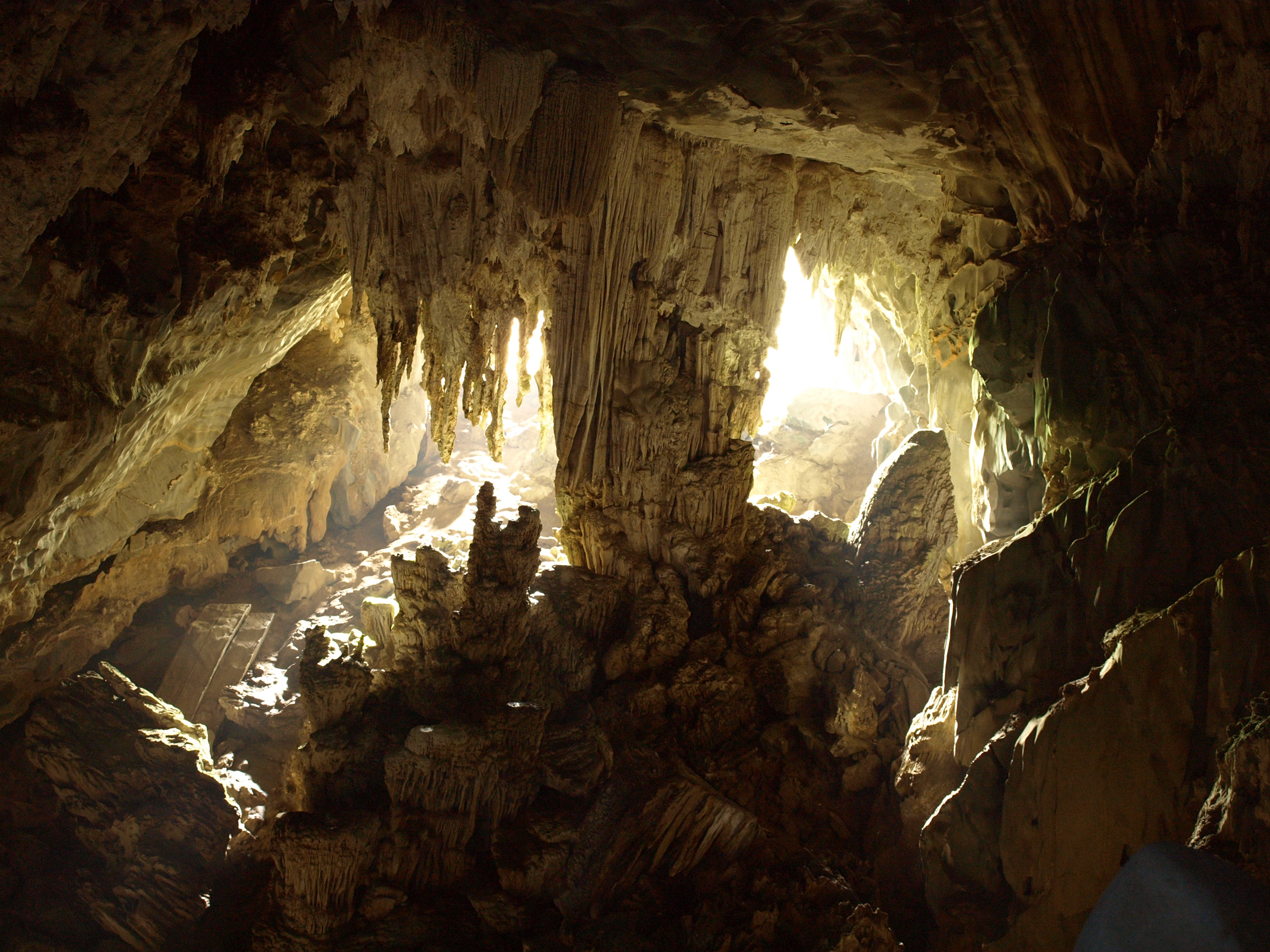
Caverna do Morro Preto

- Caverna do Morro Preto has a very beautiful cave mouth. It features extensive galleries and halls, and also an easy crossing. In only two places there are gaps of up to 5 feet, overcome by wooden stairs. In one of its halls were found traces of prehistoric habitation. Visit only with permission and ticket to the cave at the entrance.
- Caverna do Couto is located just below the Caverna do Morro Preto, this cave passes through the mountain. Beside one of its entrances is a waterfall with water coming from inside the cave, flowing into the Betari river a few feet below. In some places the ceiling is relatively low, but very interesting with hanging droplets reflecting the lights of the lanterns. It has no ornamentation, its length being of 400 meters.

=== Nucleo Caboclo ===
- Caverna da Arataca has three different entrances, the lowest one being the most usual. After 250 meters inside the cave one comes to a passage, on the other side of the mountain. The ceiling is low at the main entrance, but soon opens up into a hall. There are many passages with low ceilings and slopes with chimneys. Visit only with permission.
- Caverna do Monjolinho is 350m long and its course presents itself dry. A stream crosses the Monjolinho cave at a lower level, which is perceptible only by the roar of its waters. Among their formations, highlight is the column known as "Giant Monjolinho". The speleothems are not in good condition and care is needed in places. Visit only with permission.

=== Nucleo Casa de Pedra ===
- Gruta Casa de Pedra is known for the exuberance of its cave mouth which reaches 172m in height. Its main hall of 350m long, 120m wide and 70m high is lit by a large entrance. After the gallery, there is a distance of 25 meters to be covered swimming under strong current. Here one can climb the steep cliffs with the aid of suitable equipment. It can only be visited with specialized instructors and the crossing of borders occurs only with special authorization.

=== Open for visitation ===
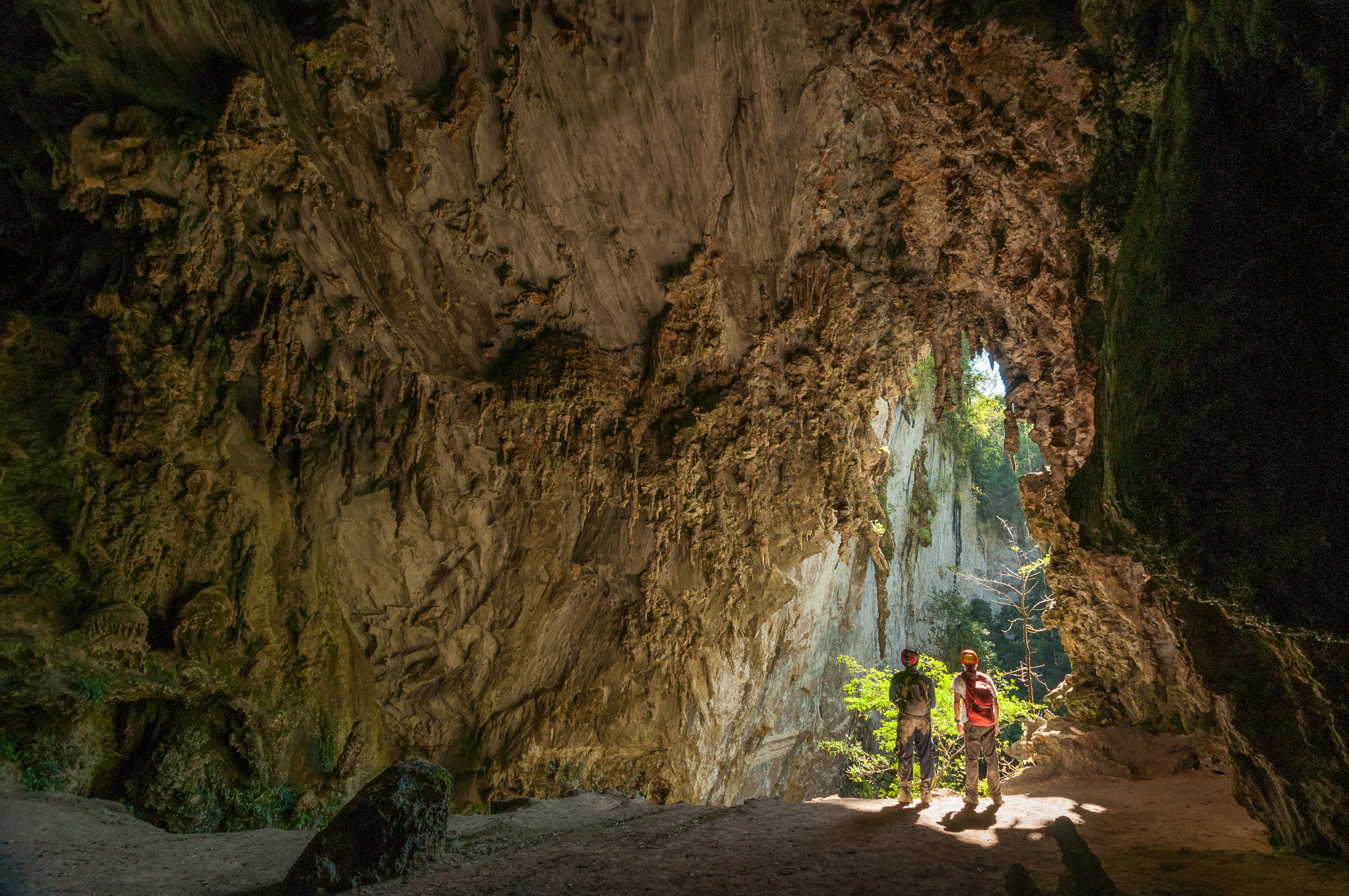
Caverna Temimina

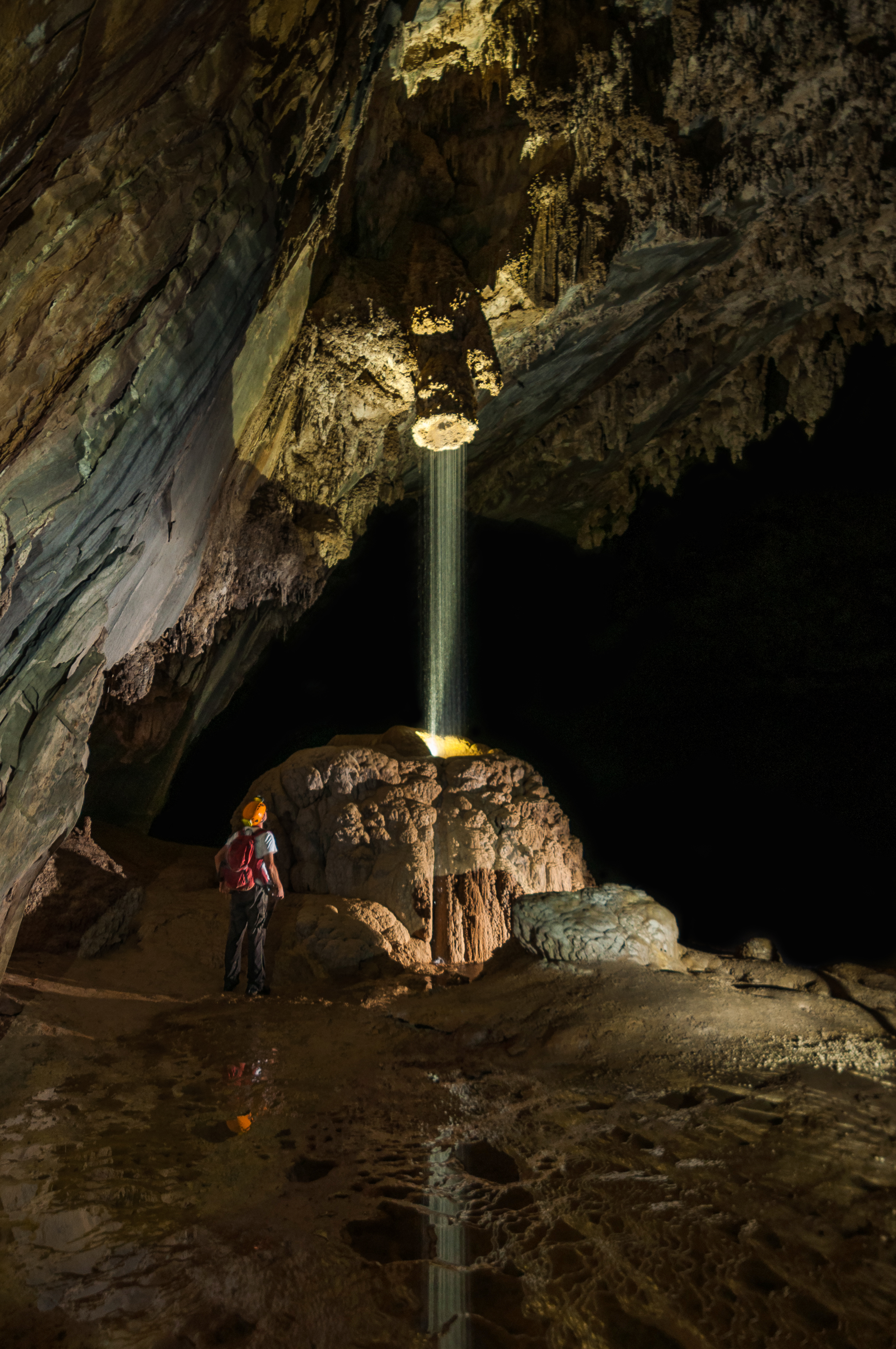
Caverna Temimina

The caves which are open for visitation read as follows:

- Nucleo Santana
  - Caverna de Santana
  - Caverna da Água Suja
  - Caverna do Morro Preto
  - Caverna do Couto
  - Caverna do Cafezal
- Nucleo Ouro Grosso
  - Caverna do Ouro Grosso;
  - Caverna do Alambari de Baixo;
- Nucleo Caboclos
  - Caverna Chapéu
  - Caverna Chapéu Mirim I e II;
  - Caverna das Aranhas;
  - Caverna Teminina
- Nucleo Casa de Pedra
  - Caverna Casa de Pedra
  - Caverna Castelo

== Sources ==
- Alckmin, Geraldo; Covas, Bruno (22 June 2012), "Decreto nº 58.148, de 21 de Junho de 2012", Diário Oficial (in Portuguese), 122 (116), Government of São Paulo
- "Decreto nº 32.283, de 19 de maio de 1958 de São Paulo" (in Portuguese). JusBrasil.
- "O Petar", PETAR Online (in Portuguese)
- Vianna, Lucila Pinsard (2008), DE INVISIVEIS A PROTAGONISTAS POPULAÇOES TRADICIONAIS E UNIDADES DE CONSERVAÇAO, Anna Blume, ISBN 978-85-7419-852-1
