= Paranapiacaba Conservation Units Mosaic =

Protected area in São Paulo, Brazil

- Mosaico de Unidades de Conservação do Paranapiacaba
- IUCN category V (protected landscape/seascape)
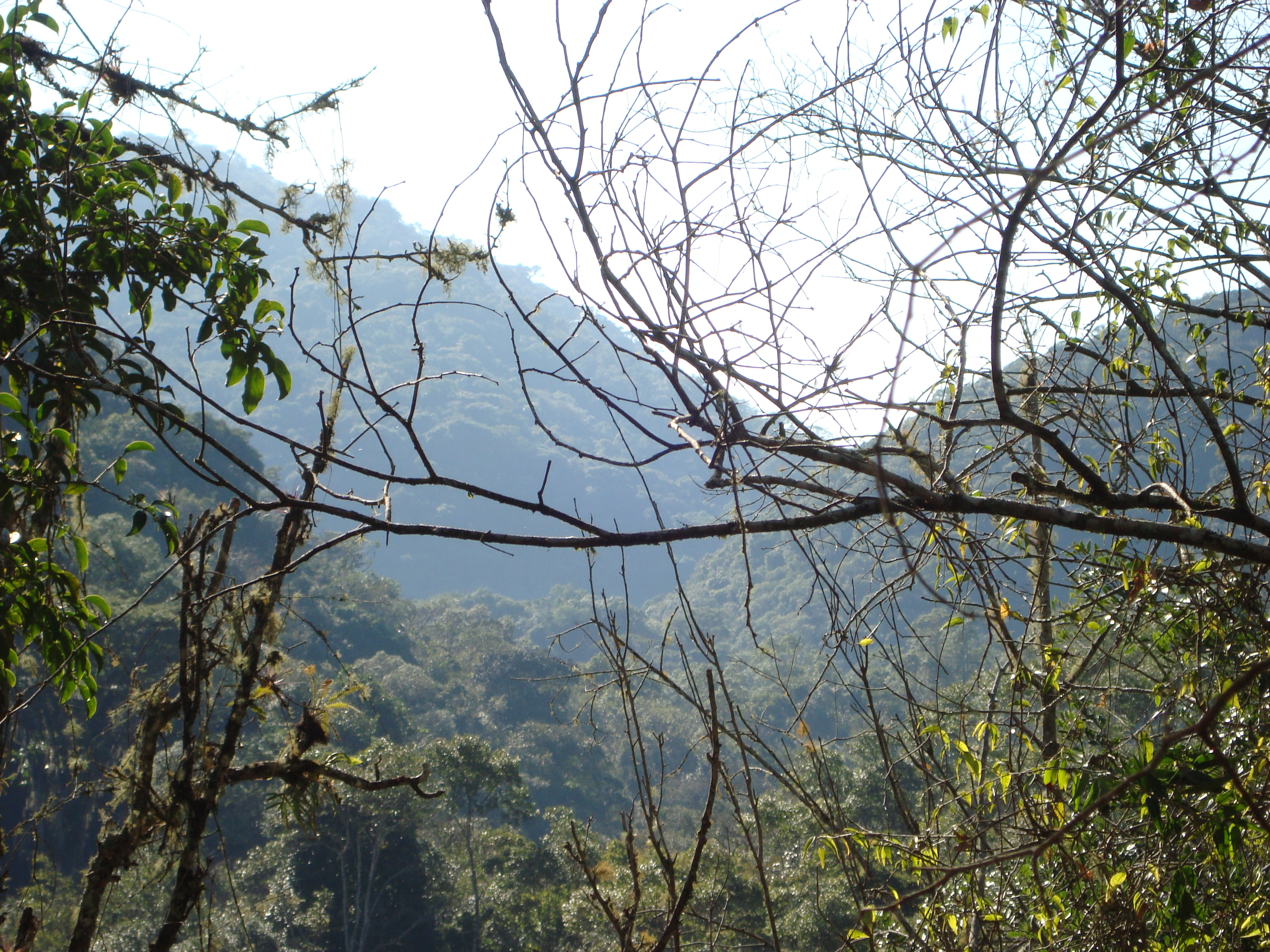
- Atlantic forest in the Intervales State Park

- Location within Brazil
- Coordinates: 24.268417°S 48.413806°W
- Area: 120,000 hectares (300,000 acres)
- Designation: protected area mosaic
- Created: 21 June 2012
- Administrator: Secretário do Meio Ambiente SP

The Paranapiacaba Conservation Units Mosaic (Portuguese: Mosaico de Unidades de Conservação do Paranapiacaba) is a protected area mosaic in the state of São Paulo, Brazil. It is administered by the state, and protects a large area of Atlantic Forest. It is associated with the Paranapiacaba Ecological Corridor of the Atlantic Forest Biosphere Reserve.

== Formation ==
In 1995 the area covered by Paranapiacaba Mosaic was declared part of the Atlantic Forest Biosphere Reserve by UNESCO, and in 2000 it was declared a natural World Heritage Site. The TCCA/FF Paranapiacaba Mosaic Project was approved by the Environmental Compensation Chamber and launched in September 2011 to define the scope, schedule, synergies and integrated management of the mosaic. During the June 2012 United Nations Conference on Sustainable Development (Rio+20) the Nascentes do Paranapanema State Park was created with 22,500 hectares (56,000 acres) of Atlantic Forest covering the sources of the Paranapanema River. The new park and other units would make up the Paranapiacaba Conservation Unit Mosaic, a forest massif of over 250,000 hectares (620,000 acres).

São Paulo state decree 58.148 of 21 June 2012 created the Nascentes do Paranapanema state park and the Paranapiacaba Conservation Units Mosaic. The mosaic consisted of the Alto Ribeira Tourist State Park, Intervales State Park, Carlos Botelho State Park, Xitué Ecological Station, Nascentes do Paranapanema State Park and the Serra do Mar Environmental Protection Area in the municipalities of Eldorado, Sete Barras, Tapiraí, Juquiá, Ribeirão Grande and Capão Bonito. The purpose was to promote integrated and participatory management of the conservation units, and to seek to guarantee conservation of the areas covered. Additional units could be later added to the mosaic by decree. The Secretariat for the Environment had 180 days to constitute the mosaic, and was to provide the material, human and financial resources needed.

== Extent ==
As of 2016 the Serra de Paranapiacaba Mosaic has over 120,000 hectares (300,000 acres) and contains the largest remaining area of Atlantic Forest in Brazil. The Intervales State Park forms the central region of the mosaic. Other conservation units in the mosaic are the Carlos Botelho, Alto Ribeira Tourist, Nascentes do Paranapanema and Caverna do Diabo state parks, Xitué Ecological Station, Serra do Mar Environmental Protection Area and Quilombos do Médio Ribeira Environmental Protection Area.

The forest of the Nascentes do Paranapanema park is extremely well preserved, and is home to the largest population of jaguars (Panthera onca) in the Atlantic Forest. It includes other threatened species such as cougar (Puma concolor), South American tapir (Tapirus terrestris), bush dog (Speothos venaticus), pygmy brocket (Mazama nana) and southern muriqui (Brachyteles arachnoides). The connection between the various areas in the Paranapiacaba mosaic will help the species to survive. The jaguar tends to avoid areas frequented by man, including areas used by hunters and gatherers of heart of palm. It is estimated that there are just 250 individual jaguars in the states of Paraná, São Paulo and Rio de Janeiro, most of them in the mosaic area.

Paranapiacaba ecological continuum

== Ecological corridor ==
The Paranapiacaba Ecological Corridor, also called the Paranapiacaba Continuum, is part of the Tombamento da Serra do Mar, established by resolution CONDEPHAAT 40/1995, and the Atlantic Forest Biosphere Reserve, created by UNESCO in 1991 and recognized in 1999 as a World Heritage Site. As of 2012 the Atlantic Forest Biosphere Reserve (RBMA) "Sources, Caves and Ecotones" project aimed to create and expand conservation units in the Paranapiacaba Ecological Corridor, a unique area for biodiversity conservation, with the largest remaining fragment of Atlantic Forest. The corridor is composed of the Carlos Botelho, Intervales and Alto Ribeira Tourist state parks, the Xitué Ecological Station and the Serra do Mar and Quilombos do Meio Ribeira environmental protection areas.

== Sources ==
- Alckmin, Geraldo; Covas, Bruno (22 June 2012), "Decreto nº 58.148, de 21 de Junho de 2012", Diário Oficial (in Portuguese), 122 (116), Government of São Paulo
- Estação Ecológica de Xitué integra Mosaico de Paranapiacaba (in Portuguese), SAP: Sistema Ambiental Paulista, 11 April 2016
- Protegendo Nascentes, Cavernas e Ecótonos: Criação e Ampliação de UCs no Corredor Ecológico de Paranapiacaba, SP (in Portuguese), RBMA
- Sobre o Parque (in Portuguese), SAP: Sistema Ambiental Paulista, archived from the original on 2016-12-12
- Tomazela, José Maria (18 June 2012), "Governo de SP cria parque para proteger nascentes do Rio Paranapanema", O Estadão (in Portuguese), Sorocaba
