= Caverna do Diabo State Park =

State park in São Paulo, Brazil

- Parque Estadual Caverna do Diabo
- IUCN category II (national park)
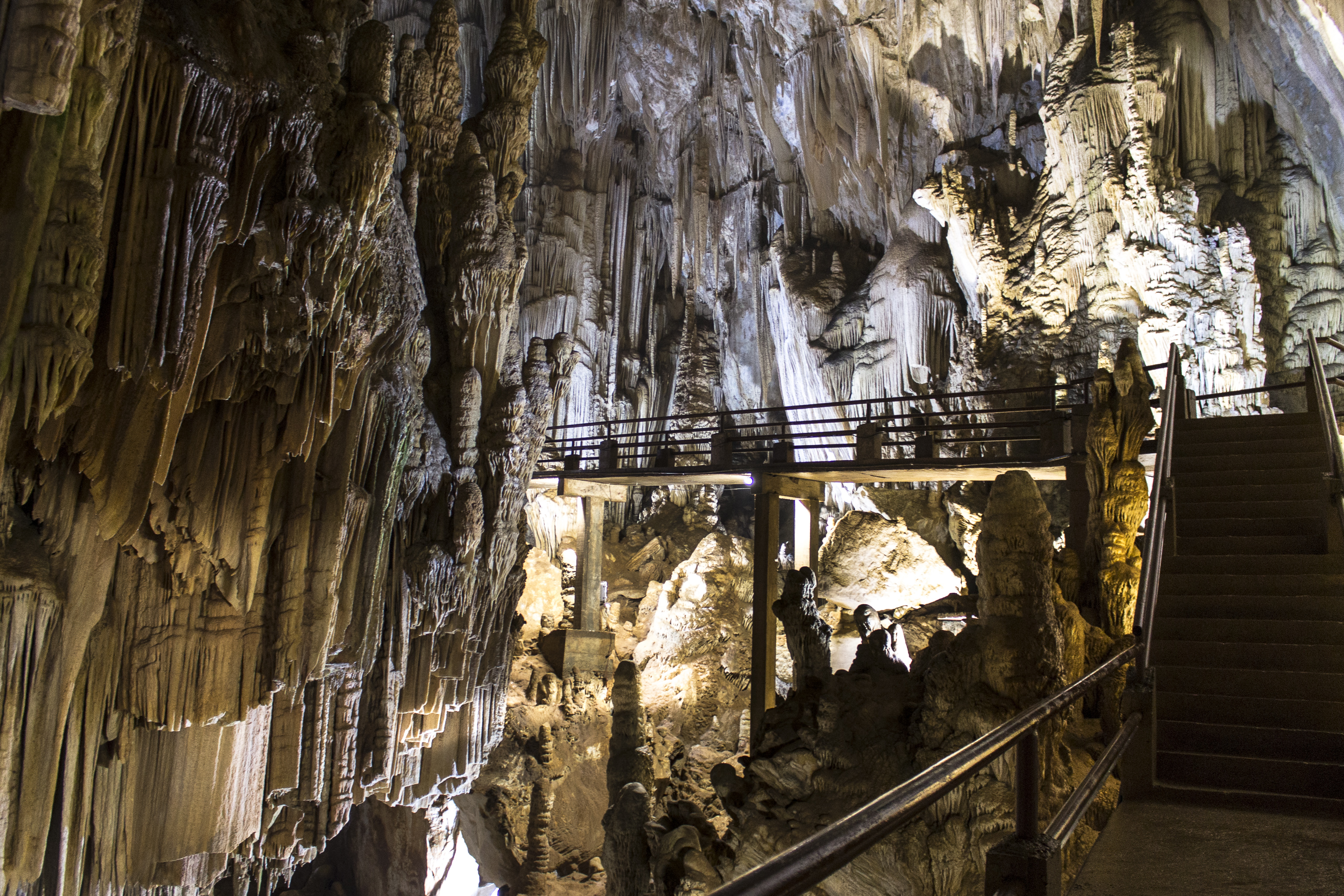
- Walkway in the Caverna da Tapagem

- Location within Brazil
- Nearest city: Barra do Turvo, São Paulo
- Coordinates: 24.659955°S 48.454678°W
- Area: 40,174.82 hectares (99,274.1 acres)
- Designation: State park
- Created: 21 February 2008
- Administrator: Fundação Florestal SP

The Caverna do Diabo State Park (Portuguese: Parque Estadual Caverna do Diabo) is a state park in the state of São Paulo, Brazil, established in 2008. It protects a mountainous area of Atlantic Forest, and is known for the dramatic Caverna da Tapagem or Caverna do Diabo, which draws thousands of visitors each year.

== Location ==
The Caverna do Diabo State Park is divided between the municipalities of Barra do Turvo, Cajati, Eldorado and Iporanga in São Paulo. It has an area of 40,174.82 hectares (99,274.1 acres). The Caverna do Diabo State Park was created by state law 12.810 of 21 February 2008. It was one of several conservation units created by law 12.810 in which the Jacupiranga Mosaic was created from the former Jacupiranga State Park and its surrounding lands. The park was created to preserve the Atlantic Forest biome.

The park forms part of the Serra de Paranapiacaba Mosaic, which has over 120,000 hectares (300,000 acres) and contains the largest remaining area of Atlantic Forest in Brazil. Other conservation units in the mosaic are the Carlos Botelho State Park, Alto Ribeira Tourist State Park, Nascentes do Paranapanema State Park, Intervales State Park, Xitué Ecological Station, Serra do Mar Environmental Protection Area and Quilombos do Médio Ribeira Environmental Protection Area.

== Environment ==
The Caverna do Diabo State Park is in a region that contains mixed rainforests and typical Atlantic Forest, with areas of araucaria. Heart of palm (Euterpe edulis) was once common, but steady clandestine extraction has greatly reduced its numbers.

The vegetation is mainly dense submontane and montane rainforest. Near the cave there is secondary growth forest in an advanced state of regeneration, mainly the Myrtaceae, Fabaceae and Rubiaceae families. The canopy is about 25 metres (82 ft) high with emergents up to 32 metres (105 ft). On the slopes and higher up the forest is gradually replaced by herbaceous-shrubby fields. In a 2009 survey 154 species of trees were identified. There are many species of fauna with a high degree of endemism, including birds, small mammals, reptiles, amphibians and insects. Birds of prey, larger mammals and fish are present in smaller numbers.

== Attractions ==
About 27,000 people visit the park each year, mainly to see the cave, which is at the Caverna do Diabo Center in Eldorado at Km 111 on the SP-165 highway. The park base includes a visitor center, monitor center, restaurant, accommodation for researchers and parking. There are also some shops selling local handicrafts and souvenirs. The visitor center provides environmental interpretation. There are two trails in the park, the Araçá trail and the Mirador do Governador Trail.

The Tapagem Cave (or Devil's Cave: Caverna do Diabo) was found in 1896 by Ricardo Krone. It follows an underground stretch of the Rio das Ostras in the Serra de André Lopes, and is over 5 kilometres (3.1 mi) long. It has been fitted with walkways and lighting to make it accessible to tourists. There is an entrance fee, and also a fee for an environmental monitor, who must accompany visitors.

== Sources ==
- "Caverna do Diabo", PETAR Online (in Portuguese)
- Leonel, Cristiane (2007), Plano de Manejo da caverna do Diabo (PDF) (in Portuguese), Fundação Florestal SP
- Parque Estadual Caverna do Diabo (in Portuguese), MMA: Ministério do Meio Ambiente
- Parque Estadual Caverna do Diabo (in Portuguese), SAP: Sistema Ambiental Paulista, archived from the original on 2015-12-10
- Sobre o Parque (in Portuguese), SAP: Sistema Ambiental Paulista
- Sobre o Parque (in Portuguese), SAP: Sistema Ambiental Paulista, archived from the original on 2016-12-12
- Zanchetta, Inês; Bedeschi, Luciana (28 February 2008), Mosaico do Jacupiranga, no Vale do Ribeira, agora é lei (in Portuguese), ISA: Instituto Socioambiental, archived from the original on 2016-11-21
