= Quilombos do Médio Ribeira Environmental Protection Area =

- Área de Proteção Ambiental dos Quilombos do Médio Ribeira
- IUCN category V (protected landscape/seascape)
- Location within Brazil
- Nearest city: Iporanga, São Paulo
- Coordinates: 24.566529°S 48.363436°W
- Area: 64,625 hectares (159,690 acres)
- Designation: Environmental protection area
- Created: 21 February 2008

The Quilombos do Médio Ribeira Environmental Protection Area (Portuguese: Área de Proteção Ambiental dos Quilombos do Médio Ribeira) is an environmental protection area in the state of São Paulo, Brazil. It supports sustainable development of communities of quilombolas, descendants of African slaves.

== Location ==
The Quilombos do Médio Ribeira Environmental Protection Area (APA) is divided between the municipalities of Barra do Turvo (2.69%), Eldorado (40.84%) and Iporanga (56.47%) in the state of São Paulo. It has an area of 64,625 hectares (159,690 acres). The APA forms part of the Serra de Paranapiacaba Mosaic, which has over 120,000 hectares (300,000 acres) and contains the largest remaining area of Atlantic Forest in Brazil. Other conservation units in the mosaic are the Carlos Botelho State Park, Alto Ribeira Tourist State Park, Nascentes do Paranapanema State Park, Caverna do Diabo State Park, Xitué Ecological Station, Serra do Mar Environmental Protection Area and Intervales State Park.

== History ==
The quilombolas of the Ribeira Valley were escaped or free slaves who settled in the area, mainly in the 18th century, and intermarried with the local people. They were the first in the state of São Paulo to organize themselves to claim land rights. The first grant of land titles were given to the communities of Maria Rosa, Pilões and São Pedro in 2001.

Law 10.850 of 6 July 2001 altered the boundaries of the Jacupiranga State Park to exclude the quilombola communities of Nhunguara, Sapatu and André Lopes, and the Intervales State Park to exclude the quilombola communities of Pilões, Maria Rosa, São Pedro, Ivaporunduva and Pedro Cubas. These communities were included in the Serra do Mar Environmental Protection Area.

The Quilombos do Médio Ribeira Environmental Protection Area was created by law 12.810 of 21 February 2008, which dissolved the old Jacupiranga State Park and created 14 new conservation units in the Jacupiranga Mosaic. It included the quilombola communities of Nhunguara, André Lopes, Sapatu, Ivaporanduva, Galvão, São Pedro, Pilões, Maria Rosa, Pedro Cubas, Pedro Cubas de Cima and Praia Grande, which had been part of the Serra do Mar Environmental Protection Area since 2001.

== Environment ==
The Ribeira de Iguape River, which rises in the state of Paraná, runs through the center of the APA. It is part of the large ecological corridor that connects the Serra do Paranapiacaba conservation units. Flora includes Euterpe edulis, Ficus citrifolia, Orchidaceae and Bromeliaceae. Fauna include cougar (Puma concolor), black-fronted piping guan (Pipile jacutinga) and southern muriqui (Brachyteles arachnoides).

== Economy ==
The APA aims for sustainable development of the quilombo communities it contains, whether through subsistence agriculture, cultural tourism or other activities. Most of the residents have only elementary education, since higher levels of education are not available in the region, and many people over 50 are illiterate. The main source of subsistence is from backyard vegetable plots. Some communities have a health clinic, but care is rudimentary.

== Sources ==
- APA dos Quilombos do Médio Ribeira, ISA: Instituto Socioambiental
- APA da Serra do Mar (APA) (in Portuguese), ISA: Instituto Socioambiental
- "Quilombos do Vale", Petar Informações (in Portuguese), archived from the original on 2016-11-22
- Sobre o Parque (in Portuguese), SAP: Sistema Ambiental Paulista, archived from the original on 2016-12-12
