= Caverna Santana =

Cave in the state of São Paulo, Brazil

Coordinates: 24.5334°S 48.7061°W

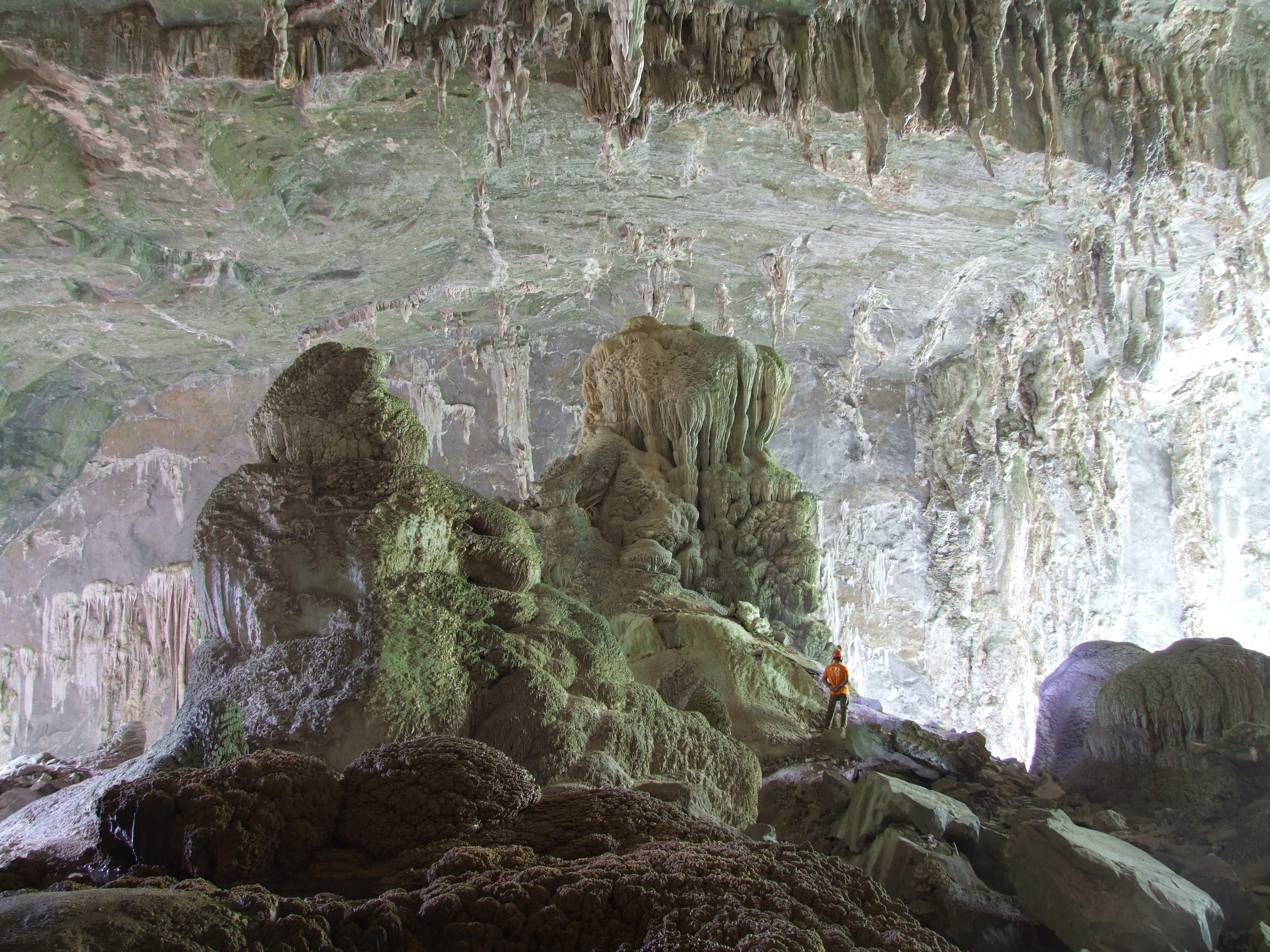
Caverna de Santana

Caverna de Santana (SP-041), also Caverna de Sant'Anna, (Note: Written like this because of the French Spelunker Pierre Martin who used to describe the cave in his own language.) is a cave located inside the Alto Ribeira Tourist State Park, along the road connecting the towns of Apiaí and Iporanga, to the south of the State of Sao Paulo, Brazil. The Flowers' Hall, displaying thousands of flowers of aragonite, and the Taqueupa Hall as one of the many other formations found in the cave, are ranked among the most beautiful and ornate in the world.

== History ==
Discovered and described at the beginning of the twentieth century as "Caverna do Rio Roncador" by the German naturalist Richard Krone, (Note: Named so because of the sound of the Roncador river, which crossed the area of the cave.) it had the potential to become one of the deepest caves in the state, but ended up being one of the most important and visited caves in the country. It is the longest cave within the state area with a horizontal projection of 8.373 meters and unevenness of 61 meters. It is widely used for environmental education tours and photography.

== See also ==
- List of caves in Brazil
