= Carlos Botelho State Park =

State park in São Paulo, Brazil

- Parque Estadual Carlos Botelho
- IUCN category II (national park)
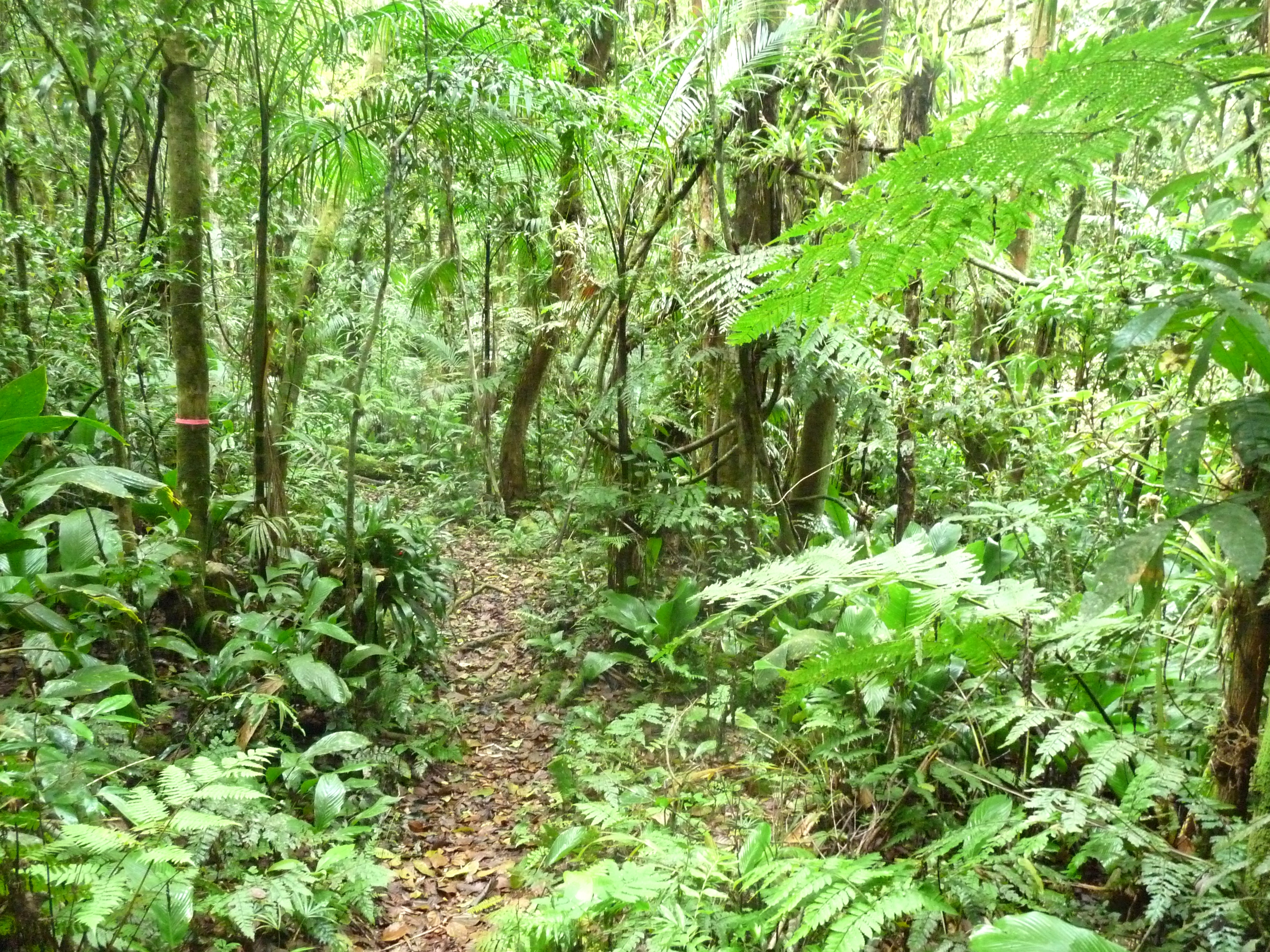
- Vegetation in the park

- Location within Brazil
- Nearest city: São Miguel Arcanjo, São Paulo
- Coordinates: 24.131389°S 47.949167°W
- Area: 37,644 hectares (93,020 acres)
- Designation: State park
- Created: 10 September 1982

The Carlos Botelho State Park (Portuguese: Parque Estadual Carlos Botelho) is a state park is the state of São Paulo, Brazil. It protects a mountainous area of Atlantic Forest. The park contains more than half of Brazil's remaining population of endangered southern muriqui, the largest primate in the Americas other than man.

== Location ==
Paranapiacaba ecological continuum

The Carlos Botelho (Note: The park is named after Carlos Botelho, a doctor specializing in urology who became Secretary of Agriculture of the State of São Paulo and later became a Senator of the Republic. In 1908 he signed the agreement for arrival of the first Japanese immigrants to Brazil.) State Park has its headquarter is São Miguel Arcanjo, São Paulo. It has an area of 37,644 hectares (93,020 acres). The surrounding land includes private landholdings and three private natural heritage reserves, Zizo Park, Rio Taquaral Park and Onça Parda (Cougar) Park. The regional economy is based on agriculture, particularly banana farming in the south, and ecotourism. The park's headquarters is in the Planalto region of the Upper Paranapanema River basin, in the municipalities of São Miguel Arcanjo and Capão Bonito. The Sete Barras center is in the Vale do Ribeira region, in the basin of the Ribeira de Iguape River, in the municipality of Sete Barras.

== History ==
The area occupied by the park was divided into four forest reserves in 1941, named Carlos Botelho, Capão Bonito, Travessão and Sete Barras. The Carlos Botelho State Park was created by state decree 19.499 of 10 September 1982. The objectives are to ensure full protection of fauna, flora and natural beauty, and to support education, recreational and scientific activities. Since its creation the park has attracted many researchers, mainly due to its position between two important river basins, its place in the Paranapiacaba ecological continuum, and the many endemic species it shelters. Land ownership has been fully regularized, and there are no residents in the park.

São Paulo state decree 58.148 of 21 June 2012 created the Paranapiacaba Conservation Units Mosaic, consisting of the Alto Ribeira Tourist State Park, Intervales State Park, Carlos Botelho State Park, Xitué Ecological Station, Nascentes do Paranapanema State Park and the Serra do Mar Environmental Protection Area in the municipalities of Eldorado, Sete Barras, Tapiraí, Juquiá, Ribeirão Grande and Capão Bonito. The purpose was to promote integrated and participatory management of the conservation units, and to seek to guarantee conservation of the areas covered.

In November 2015 a section of the SP-139 Nequinho Fogaça Highway that passes through the park was inaugurated by state governor Geraldo Alckmin. It had been closed since January 2014 while being upgraded. The road used ecologically friendly paving, and has underpasses and overpasses for the animals.

== Environment ==
The park covers a steep and mountainous area with altitudes ranging from 50 to 975 metres (164 to 3,199 ft). Average temperatures are 19 °C (66 °F) with maximum temperature of 34 °C (93 °F). There may be frost in June and July, with light but persistent rainfall in the winter. Annual rainfall is from 1,475 to 2,189 millimetres (58.1 to 86.2 in), with the period from September to February having the most rain. In the lower parts the average temperature is 22 °C (72 °F) and average annual rainfall is 1,600 millimetres (63 in). There are many rivers and waterfalls.

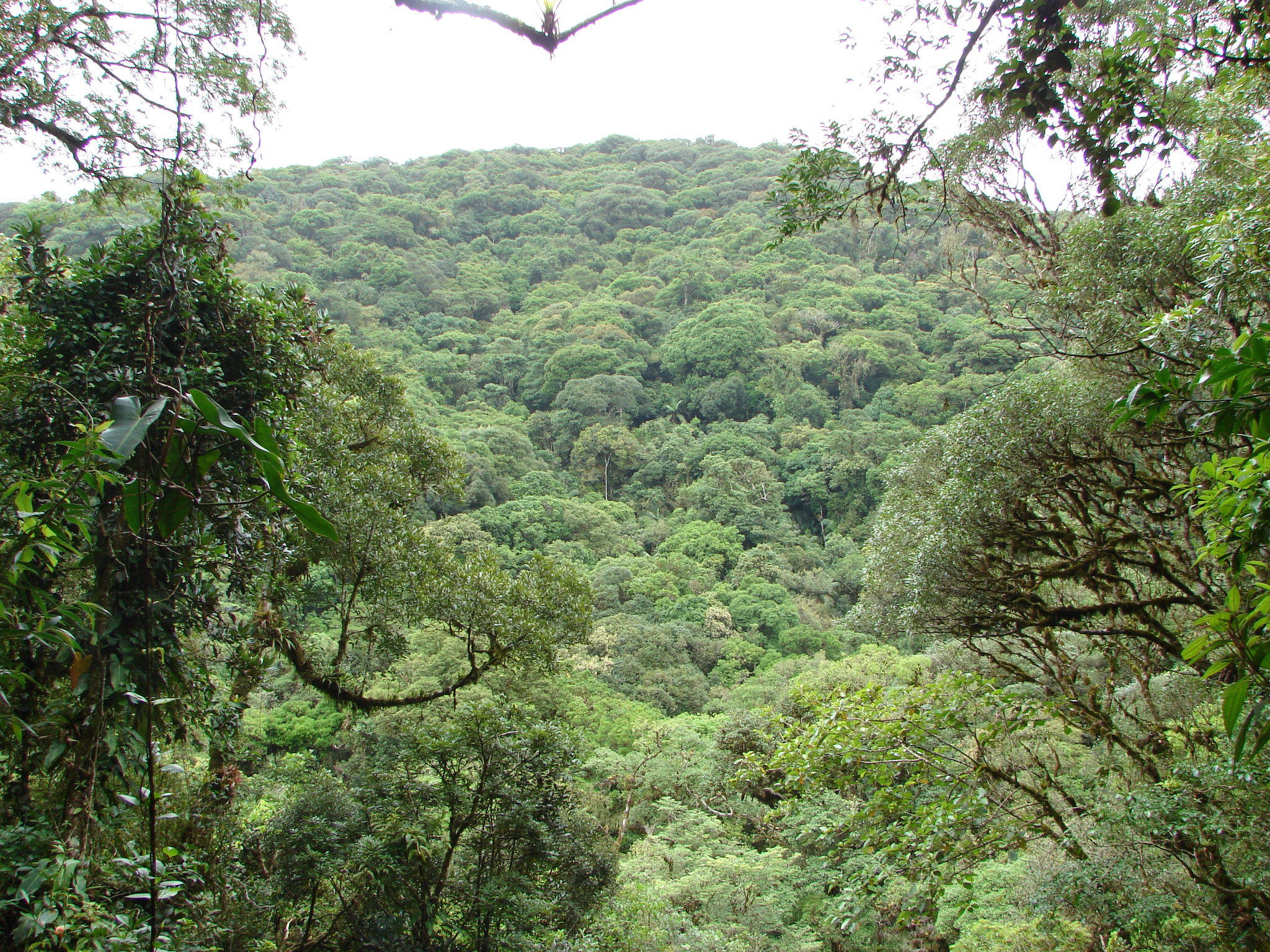
Atlantic Forest in the park

The park is in the Atlantic Forest biome. The vegetation is mainly montane and submontane rainforest. In the highest parts of the park there are small areas of dense high montane rainforest and alpine meadows on shallow and stony soils. There is dense lowland rainforest in the areas below 50 metres (160 ft). Some of the forest is well preserved, with a continuous canopy of more than 20 metres (66 ft), while other areas have secondary formations with a lower and more open canopy. The park interior has areas that are rich in bamboos, particularly Guadua tagoara.

An inventory of vascular species published in 2011 identified 1,143 species in 528 genera and 140 families. There was rich biodiversity among the Myrtaceae, Orchidaceae, Fabaceae, Asteraceae, Melastomataceae, Lauraceae, Rubiaceae and Bromeliaceae. The inventory did not include all species of herbs, lianas and epiphytes. More than 60 of the species were endangered. Evidence of illegal logging of palmito-juçara (Euterpe edulis) is common in some parts of the park.

About 1,200 southern muriqui (Brachyteles arachnoides) remain in Brazil, of whom more than half live in the park. Other endangered species include the jaguar (Panthera onca) and the black-fronted piping guan (Pipile jacutinga). More than 220 species of birds have been identified, but the actual number may be much higher. Species include Amazon parrots, blue-bellied parrot (Triclaria malachitacea), white-necked hawk (Buteogallus lacernulatus) and black hawk-eagle (Spizaetus tyrannus).

== Activities ==
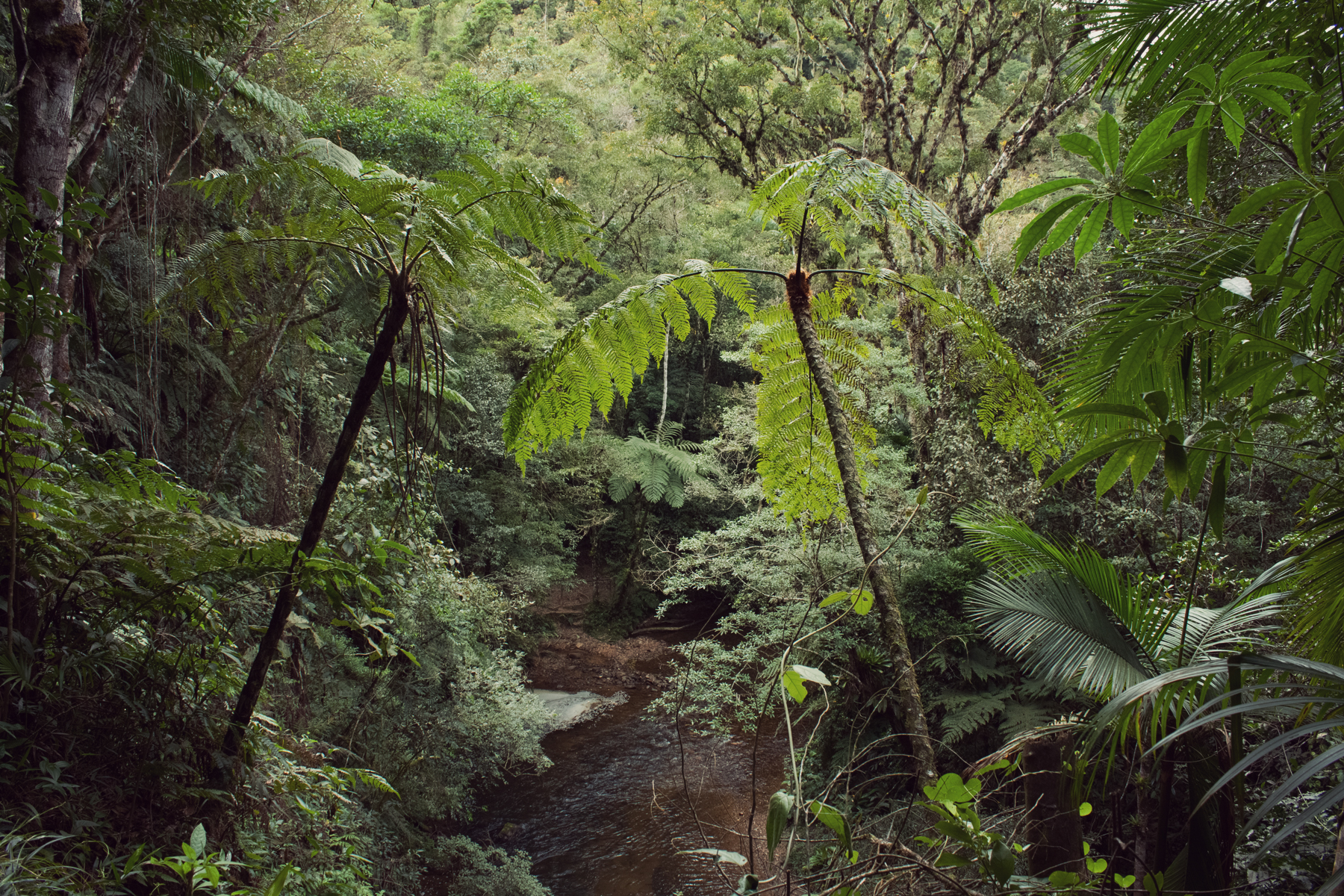
Taquaral River

The park headquarters in São Miguel Arcanjo has an Environmental Education Center with a Zoology Museum and a library with many publications on ecology, animals and plants. The Marco Antônio dos Santos Costa center has an auditorium for 40 people where environmental videos are displayed. There are waterfalls and adventure sports. The park has several trails with varying degrees of difficulty, some taking more than a day, and some requiring a guide. The Figueira trail in the Sete Barras center is 2 kilometres (1.2 mi) long and leads to a huge old fig tree.

The two main trails are near the park headquarters. The Rio Taquaral trail starts at the forest police inspection station and ends on the banks of the Taquaral River. It is 4 kilometres (2.5 mi) long and is marked with signs for students. It shows the succession from fields to secondary forest that is being regenerated to undisturbed native forest. The Represa (Dam) trail follows winding paths and crosses streams through dense greenery, and is best visited with monitors who can interpret the environment. The 7.2 kilometres (4.5 mi) Represa e Fornos (Dam and Furnaces) trail has medium difficulty, requires a guide, and takes about three and a half hours. It passes the ruins of five kilns used to make charcoal in the 1940s when the park was a farm.

== Sources ==
- Alckmin, Geraldo; Covas, Bruno (22 June 2012), "Decreto nº 58.148, de 21 de Junho de 2012", Diário Oficial (in Portuguese), 122 (116), Government of São Paulo
- "Atrações do Parque Estadual Carlos Botelho e arredores", Trilhas e Aventuras (in Portuguese)
- Lima, Renato Augusto Ferreira de; Dittrich, Vinícius Antonio de Oliveira; Souza, Vinícius Castro de; Salino, Alexandre; Breier, Tiago Böer; Aguiar, Osny Tadeu de (2011), "Flora vascular do Parque Estadual Carlos Botelho, São Paulo, Brasil", Biota Neotropica (in Portuguese), 11 (4), doi:10.1590/S1676-06032011000400018
- Parque Estadual Carlos Botelho (in Portuguese), Pick-upau
- Parque Estadual Carlos Botelho: Sobre a Unidade de Conservação (in Portuguese), SAP: Sistema Ambiental Paulista
- "Passeio ecológico pelo Parque Estadual Carlos Botelho – SP, Brasil", Trilheiros.net (in Portuguese), 15 May 2015
- "Serra da Macaca em São Miguel Arcanjo é inaugurada após obra", G1 Globo (in Portuguese), 23 November 2015
- Sobre o Parque (in Portuguese), SAP: Sistema Ambiental Paulista, archived from the original on 2016-12-30
