= Serra do Mar Environmental Protection Area =

Protected area in São Paulo, Brazil

- Área de Proteção Ambiental Serra do Mar
- IUCN category V (protected landscape/seascape)
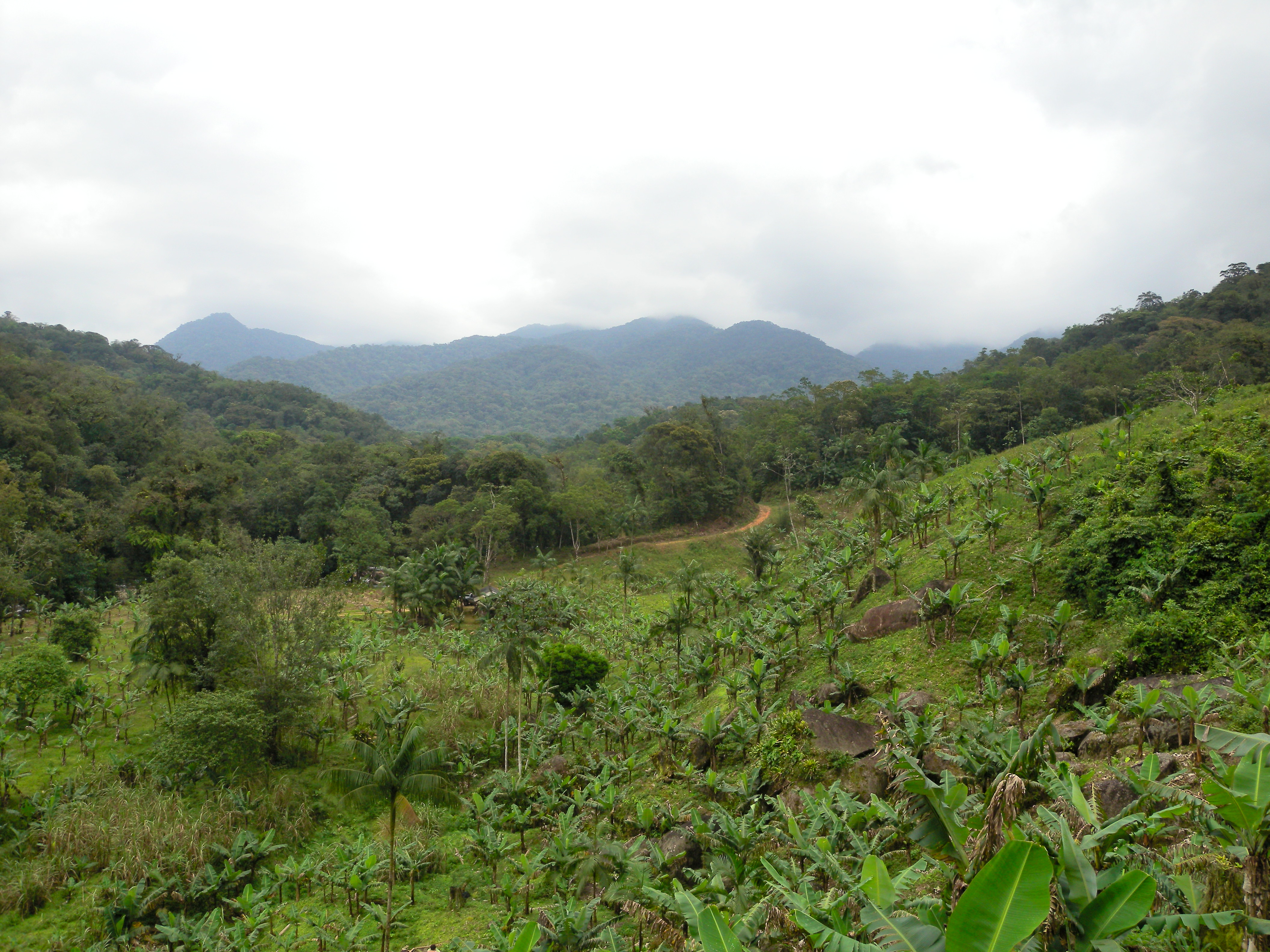
- Landscape in Sete Barras

- Location within Brazil
- Nearest city: Sete Barras, São Paulo
- Coordinates: 24.334625°S 47.843991°W
- Area: 488,865 hectares (1,208,010 acres)
- Designation: Environmental protection area
- Created: 21 September 1984

The Serra do Mar Environmental Protection Area (Portuguese: Área de Proteção Ambiental Serra do Mar) is an environmental protection area in the state of São Paulo, Brazil. It controls land use in an extensive area of Atlantic Forest in the Serra do Mar range.

== Location ==
The Serra do Mar Environmental Protection Area is divided between the municipalities of Capão Bonito (5.23%), Eldorado (18.97%), Guapiara (0.08%), Ibiúna (0.48%), Iporanga (5.63%), Juquiá (16.76%), Juquitiba (2.4%), Miracatu (16.55%), Pedro de Toledo (2.43%), Ribeirão Grande (2.51%), Sete Barras (15.59%) and Tapiraí (13.38%) in the state of São Paulo. It has an area of 488,865 hectares (1,208,010 acres). It is in the south of the state, and covers part of the Ribeira de Iguape River basin. It provides the main link between the Serra do Mar State Park and the other conservation units in the Vale do Ribeira. The APA is part of the Atlantic Forest Biosphere Reserve, recognized by UNESCO as the first such reserve in Brazil and one of the largest in the world to cover a forest area.

== History ==
The Serra do Mar Environmental Protection Area was created by SP governor Franco Montoro by decree 22.717 of 21 September 1984, protecting the slopes of the Serra de Paranapiacaba and adjoining region. It excluded the Alto Ribeira Tourist State Park and the Jacupiranga State Park from the Serra do Mar APA. Decree 43.651 of 26 September 1998 stated that the APA did not include land recognized as the property of the remnants of quilombo communities. The main objective is to protect a part of the Serra do Mar that is covered by an extensive area of Atlantic Forest, one of the best-preserved areas of the center-south region of Brazil, with great diversity of fauna and flora including endemic and endangered species.

Law 10.850 of 6 July 2001 altered the boundaries of the Jacupiranga State Park to exclude the quilombola communities of Nhunguara, Sapatu and André Lopes, and the Intervales State Park to exclude the quilombola communities of Pilões, Maria Rosa, São Pedro, Ivaporunduva and Pedro Cubas. These communities were included in the Serra do Mar APA. Law 12.810 of 21 February 2008 altered the boundaries of the Jacupiranga State Park, conservation units and Jacupiranga Mosaic. The quilombola communities that had formerly been in the Intervales State Park were made part of the Quilombos do Médio Ribeira Environmental Protection Area.

São Paulo state decree 58.148 of 21 June 2012 created the Paranapiacaba Conservation Units Mosaic, including the Alto Ribeira Tourist State Park, Intervales State Park, Carlos Botelho State Park, Xitué Ecological Station, Nascentes do Paranapanema State Park and the portion of the Serra do Mar Environmental Protection Area in the municipalities of Eldorado, Sete Barras, Tapiraí, Juquiá, Ribeirão Grande and Capão Bonito. The purpose was to promote integrated and participatory management of the conservation units, and to seek to guarantee conservation of the areas covered.

== Sources ==
- Alckmin, Geraldo; Covas, Bruno (22 June 2012), "Decreto nº 58.148, de 21 de Junho de 2012", Diário Oficial (in Portuguese), 122 (116), Government of São Paulo
- APA da Serra do Mar (APA) (in Portuguese), ISA: Instituto Socioambiental
- Área de Proteção Ambiental Serra do Mar (in Portuguese), SAP: Sistema Ambiental Paulista
