= Intervales State Park =

State park in São Paulo, Brazil

- Parque Estadual Intervales
- IUCN category II (national park)
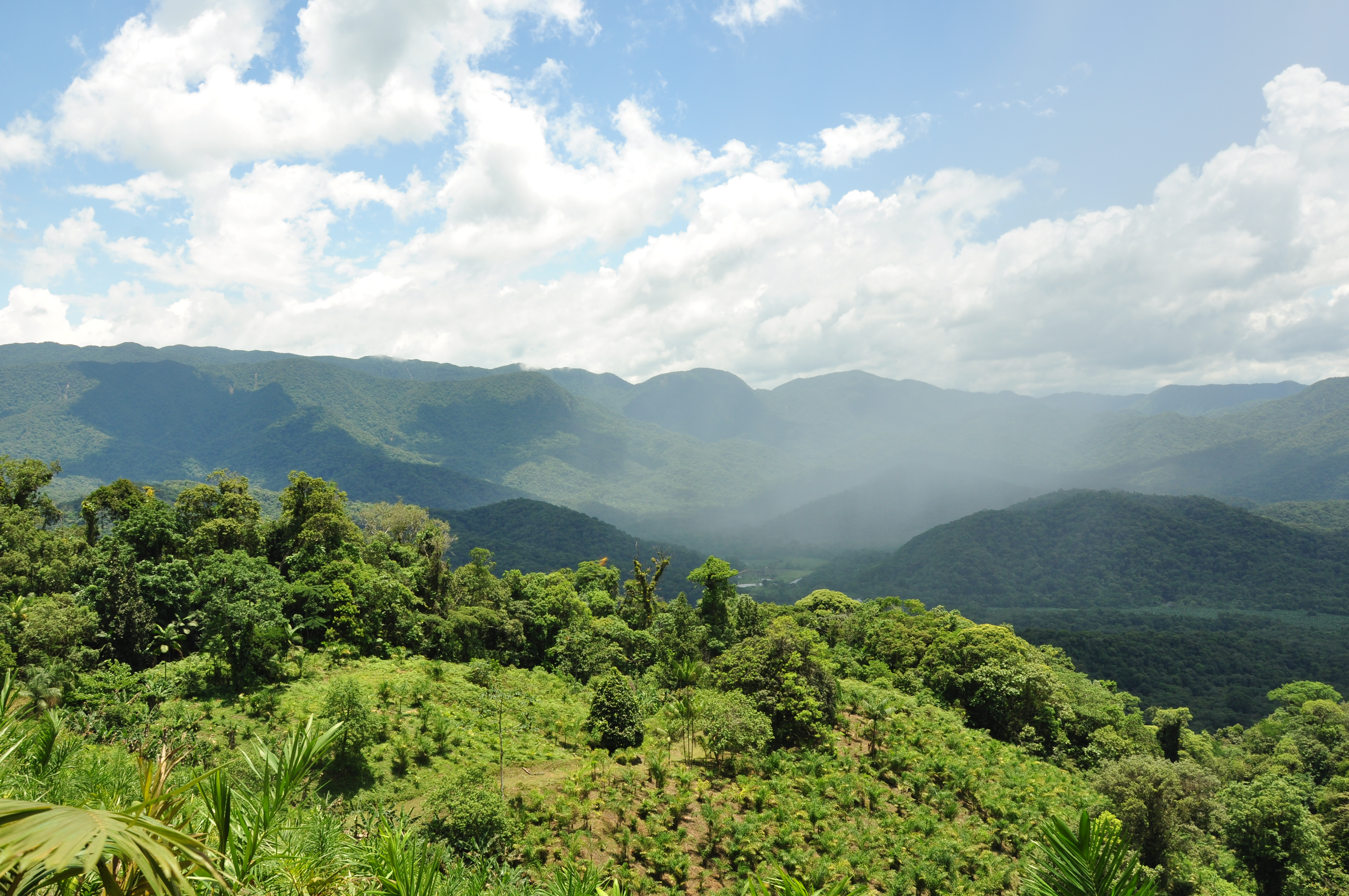
- View of the Atlantic Forest in the park

- Location within Brazil
- Nearest city: Ribeirão Grande, São Paulo
- Coordinates: 24.268417°S 48.413806°W
- Area: 41,704 hectares (103,050 acres)
- Designation: State park
- Created: 8 June 1995

The Intervales State Park (Portuguese: Parque Estadual Intervales) is a state park in the state of São Paulo, Brazil. It protects an area of Atlantic Forest, including parts of the Serra de Paranapiacaba and the Ribeira de Iguape and Paranapanema river basins.

== Location ==
Paranapiacaba ecological continuum

The Intervales State Park has its headquarters in the municipality of Ribeirão Grande, São Paulo. It includes parts of the municipalities of Ribeirão Grande: 147.31 hectares (364.0 acres), Guapiara: 310.12 hectares (766.3 acres), Sete Barras: 1,525.58 hectares (3,769.8 acres), Iporanga: 20,481 hectares (50,610 acres) and Eldorado: 16,660 hectares (41,200 acres). It has a total area of 41,704.27 hectares (103,053.5 acres).

The park forms the central region of the Serra de Paranapiacaba Mosaic, which has over 120,000 hectares (300,000 acres) and contains the largest remaining area of Atlantic Forest in Brazil. Other conservation units in the mosaic are the Carlos Botelho State Park, Alto Ribeira Tourist State Park, Nascentes do Paranapanema State Park, Caverna do Diabo State Park, Xitué Ecological Station, Serra do Mar Environmental Protection Area and Quilombos do Médio Ribeira Environmental Protection Area.

== History ==
The Intervales State Park originated with the Fazenda Intervales (Intervalley Farm), which was managed by Banco Banespa until 1986. From 1987 it was managed as a park by the Forest Foundation. 97% of the park was the former farm, owned by the Forest Foundation, and the remainder was vacant land owned by the state. A 1991 UNESCO resolution included the fazenda in the nucleus of the Atlantic Forest Biosphere Reserve.

The Intervales State Park was formally created by state decree 40.135 of 8 June 1995. In 1999 UNESCO declared it as a Natural World Heritage Site. The park boundaries were altered by decrees 44.293 of 1999 and law 10.850 of 2001. As of 2008 the park was well staffed, with 92 personnel in different roles. There were about 9,000 visitors each year.

== Environment ==
The name Intervales means "between the valleys", and refers to the park's location on the top of the Serra de Paranapiacaba between the basins of the Ribeira de Iguape and Paranapanema rivers. In the municipality of Ribeirão Grande the terrain is mountainous, with altitudes from 900 to 1,200 metres (3,000 to 3,900 ft). There are many caves, and rich biodiversity. In the municipality of Sete Barras the terrain is still mostly mountainous but has extensive floodplains, with altitudes from 80 to 900 metres (260 to 2,950 ft).

Average annual rainfall is 1,675 millimetres (65.9 in) in the Vale do Ribeira tectonic depression, 2,023 millimetres (79.6 in) in the Serra de Paranapiacaba and 1,385 millimetres (54.5 in) on the Guapiara Plateau. Vegetation is mainly rainforest. Towards the center of the park, where the Serra de Paranapiacaba forms the watershed between the Ribeira do Iguape and Paranapanema basins, more of the flora belong to seasonal semi-deciduous forest. Fauna include 751 species of invertebrates, 49 fish, 101 amphibians, 44 reptiles, 379 birds and 121 mammals, including 325 species of special interest for conservation.

== Facilities ==
The administrative, maintenance and operational support infrastructure is concentrated at the headquarters. It includes four lodgings with a capacity of 100 guests, a restaurant, an environmental monitoring center, soccer fields, a playground, housing for researchers and staff residences. From the headquarters there are short and medium-length trails that give access to waterfalls, caves and belvederes, with stretches of forest in a good state of conservation. Visitors may engage in bird watching. From the Quilombo and Guapiriuvu bases there are trails with access to waterfalls and lookouts. The Chapel of Santo Inácio e Encanados on the border with the Xitué Ecological Station is of historical and cultural interest.

== Gallery ==
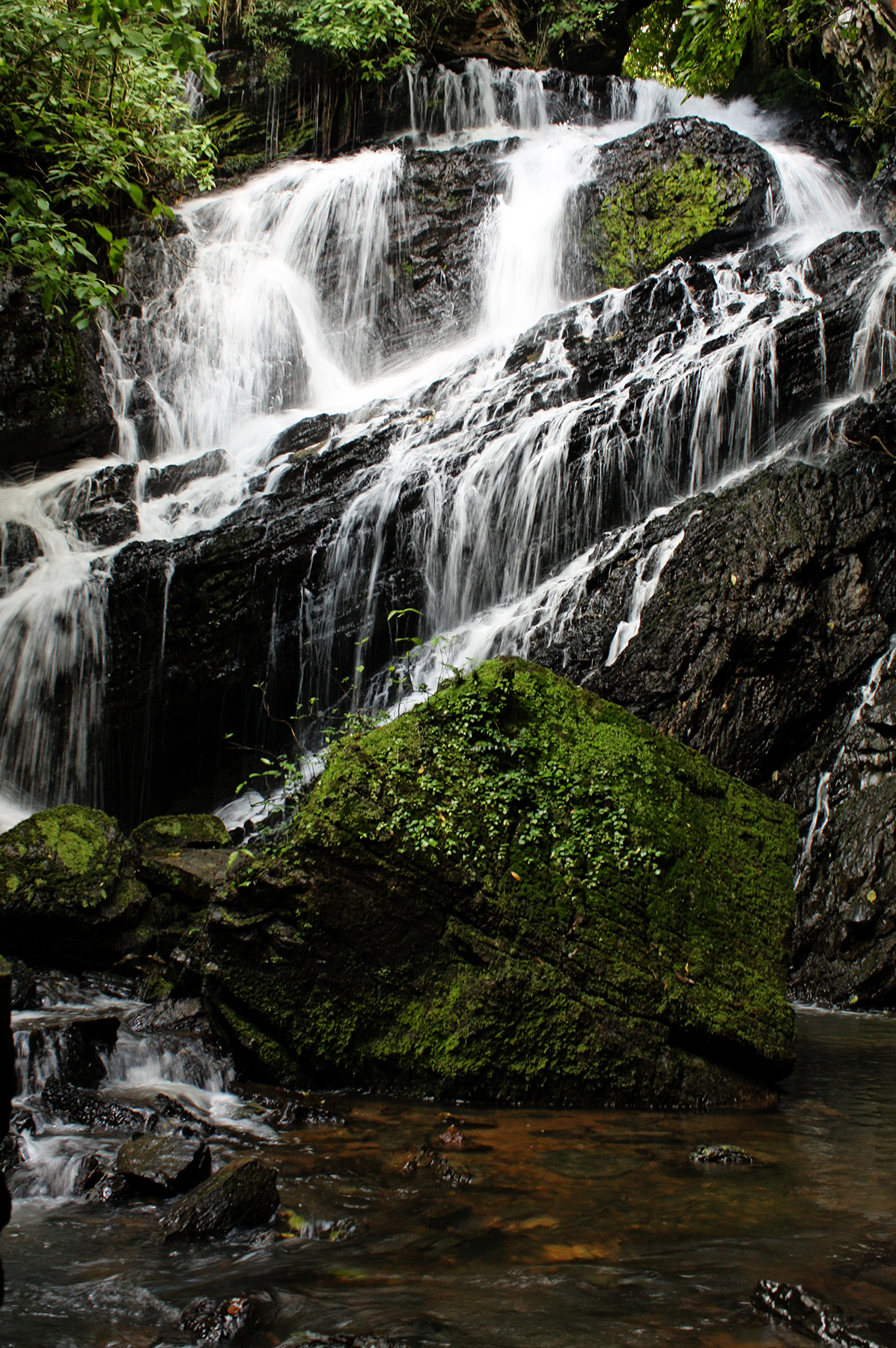
Arcão waterfall

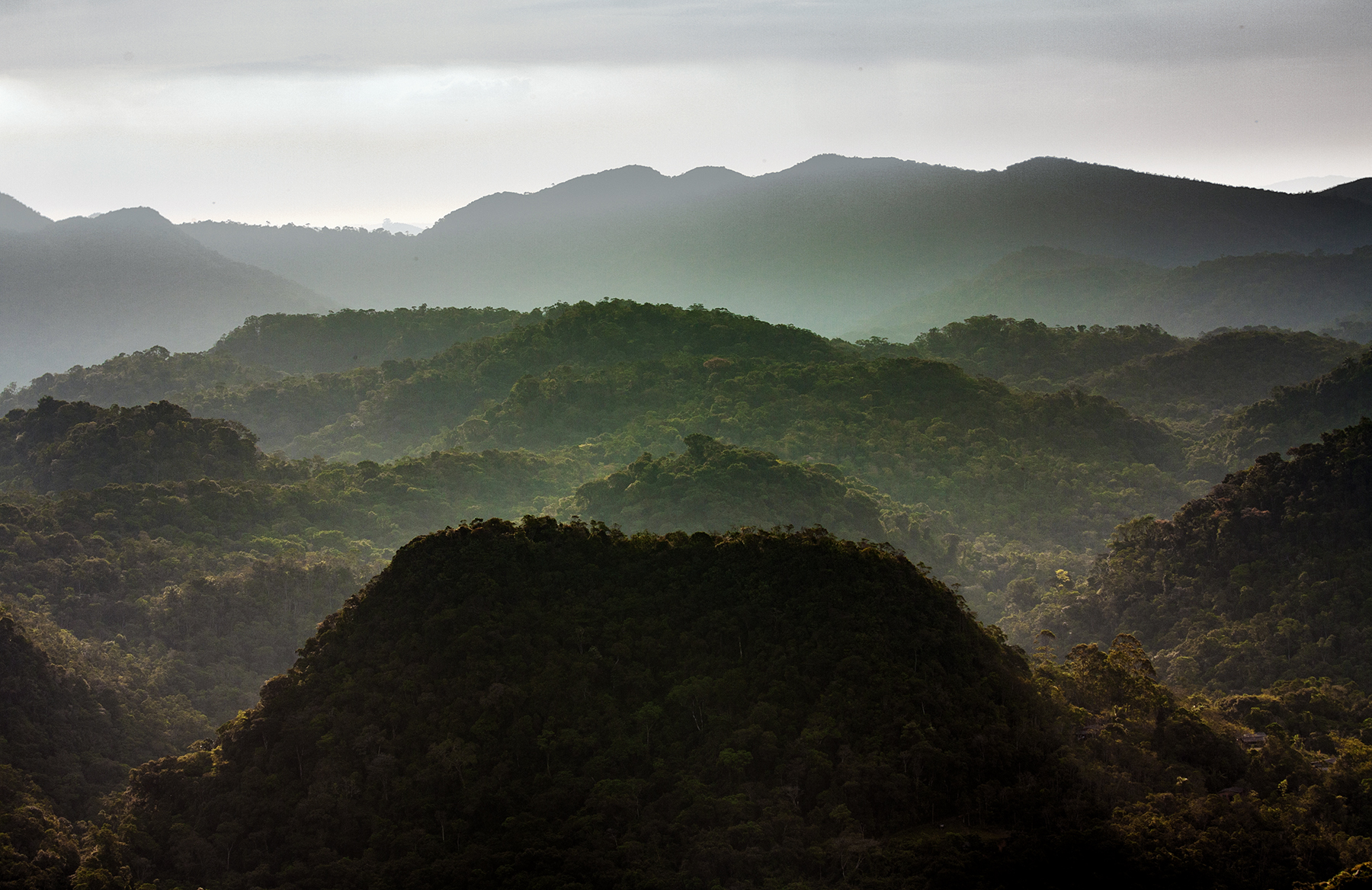
"Mirante da Anta" overlook

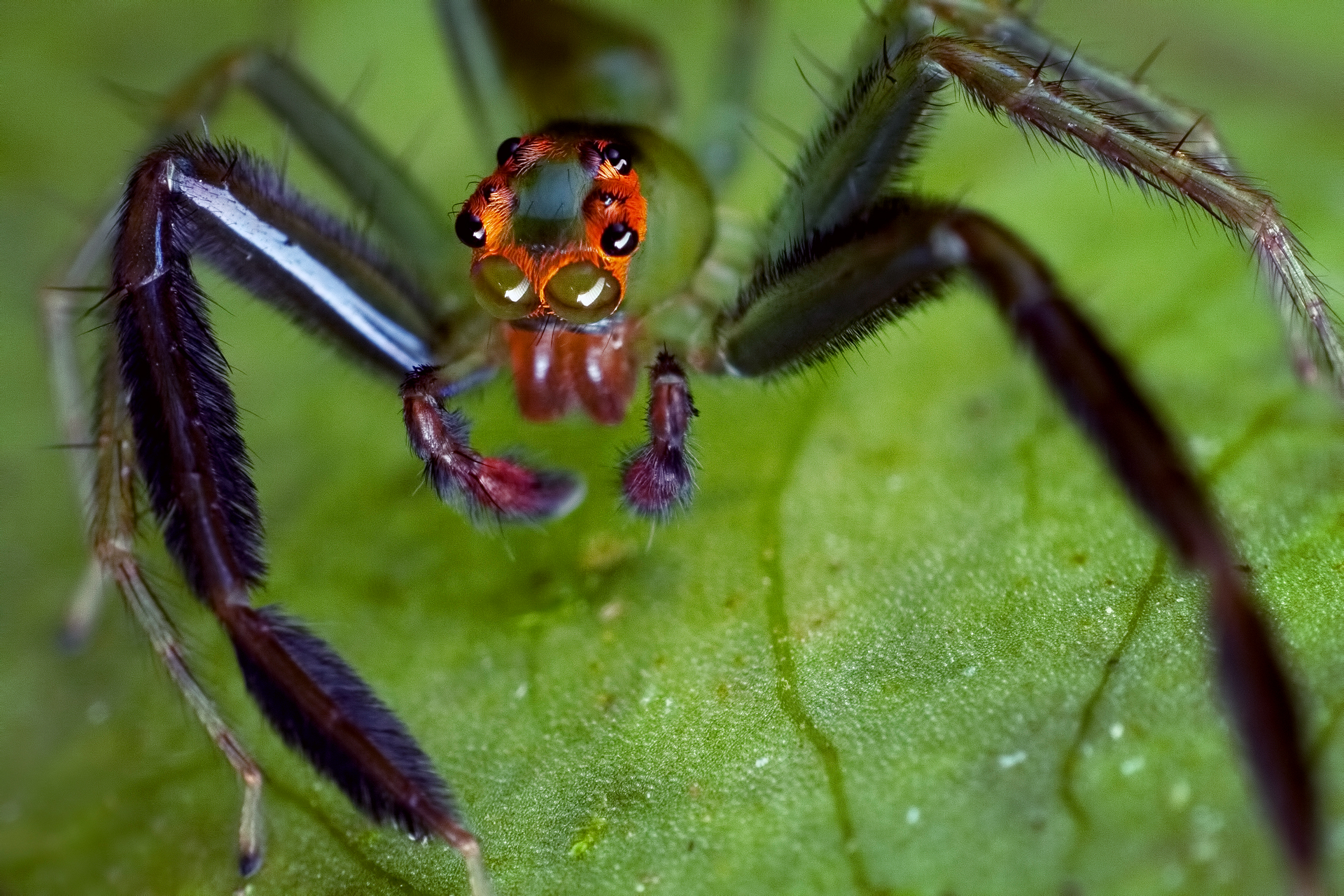
Green jumping spider, Lyssomanes sp.

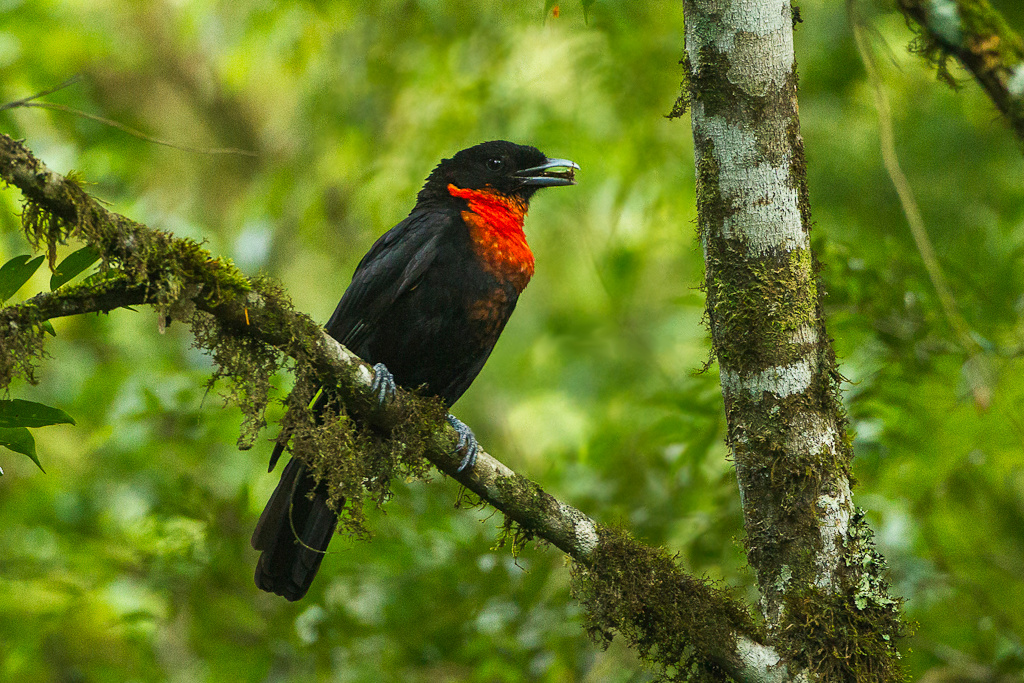
Red-ruffed Fruitcrow, Pyroderus scutatus

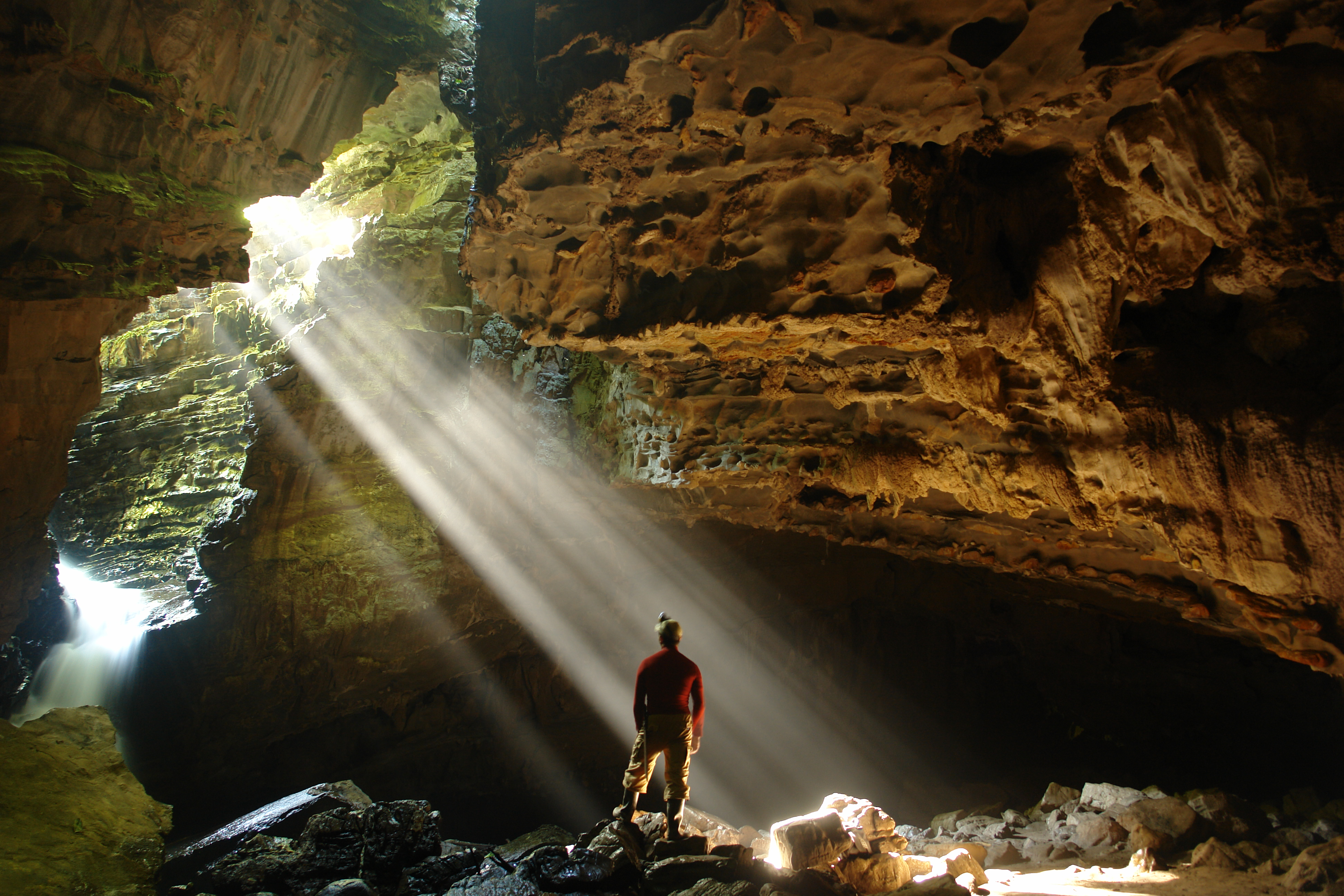
"Caverna Luminosa" cave

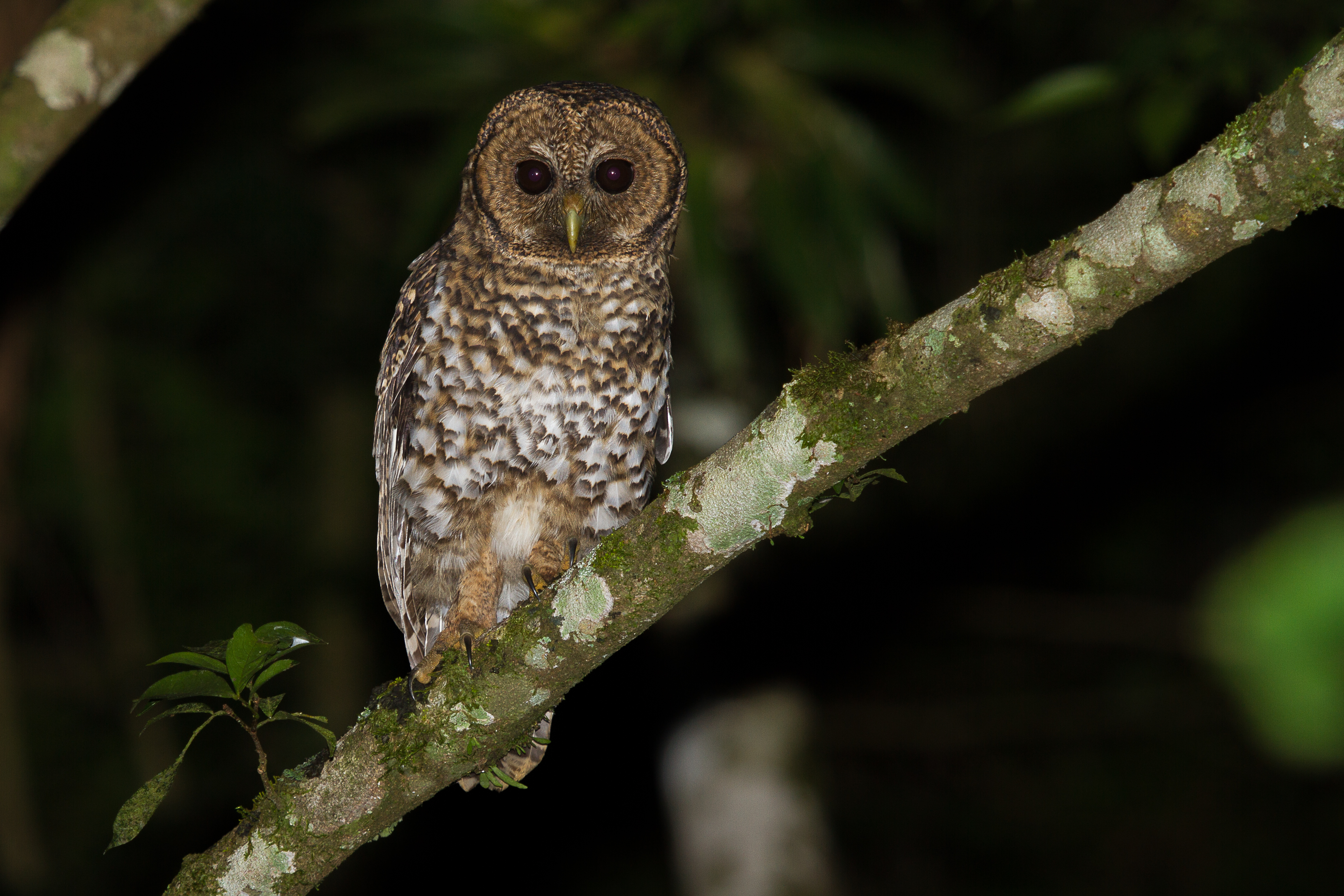
Rusty-barred Owl (Strix hylophila)

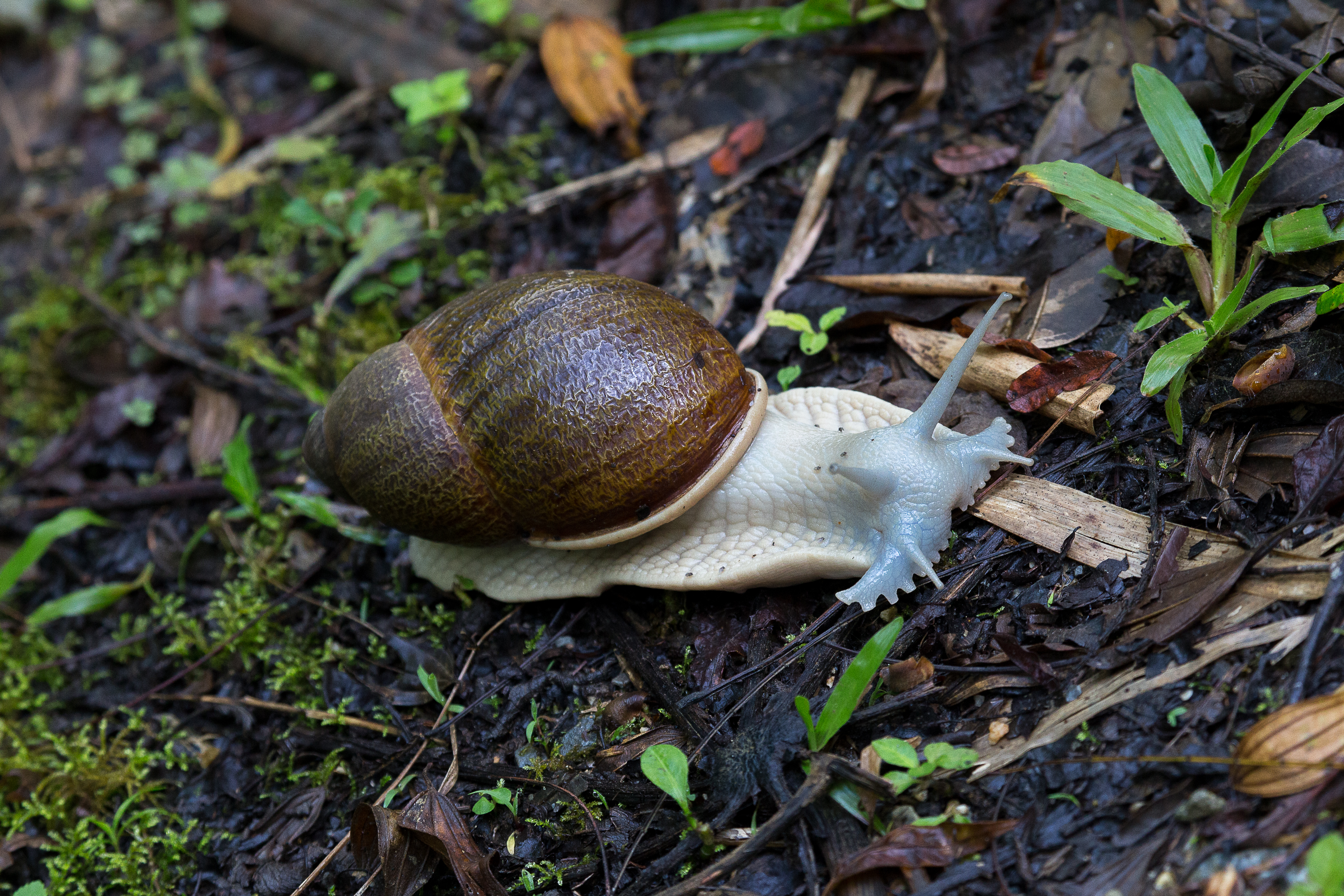
Megalobulimus dryades, a local species of land snail

== Sources ==
- Furlan, Sueli Ângelo; Leite, Sandra Aparecida (2008), "Resumo Executivo", Parque Estadual Intervales: Plano de Manejo (PDF) (in Portuguese), Fundação Florestal
- Sobre o Parque (in Portuguese), SAP: Sistema Ambiental Paulista, archived from the original on 2016-12-12
