= Apiaí =

Municipality in the state of São Paulo in Brazil

- Municipality
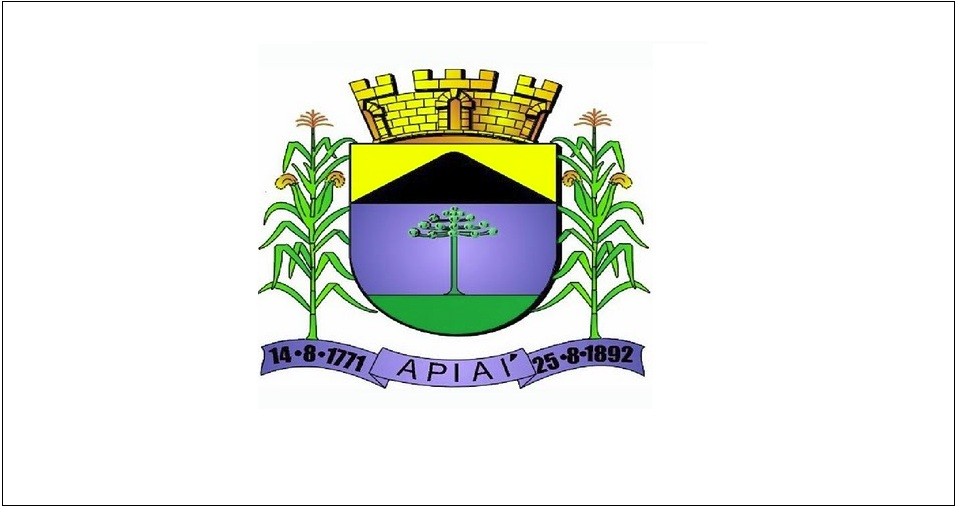
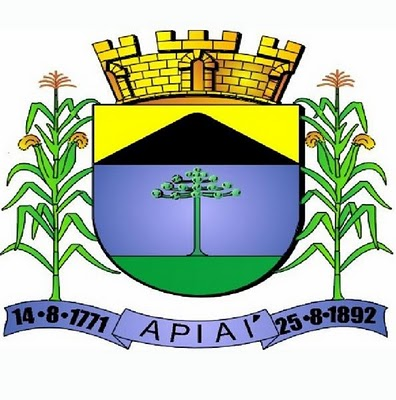
- Flag Coat of arms

- Location in São Paulo state

- Location in Brazil
- Coordinates: 24°30′35″S 48°50′34″W
- Country: Brazil
- Region: Southeast
- State: São Paulo

Area
  - Total: 974 km^{2} (376 sq mi)

Population (2020)
  - Total: 24,226
  - Density: 24.9/km^{2} (64.4/sq mi)
- Time zone: UTC−3 (BRT)

Apiaí is a Brazilian municipality of the state of São Paulo. The population is 24,226 (2020 est.) in an area of 974 km^{2}.

== Demographics ==
Historical population (municipality)
Year	Population	%±
1920	12,342
1940	11,839	−4.1%
1950	12,633	6.7%
1960	16,221	28.4%
1970	19,635	21.0%
1980	26,933	37.2%
1991	35,185	30.6%
2000	27,162	−22.8%
2010	25,191	−7.3%
2022	24,585	−2.4%

== Media ==
In telecommunications, the city was served by Companhia de Telecomunicações do Estado de São Paulo until 1975, when it began to be served by Telecomunicações de São Paulo. In July 1998, this company was acquired by Telefónica, which adopted the Vivo brand in 2012.

The company is currently an operator of cell phones, fixed lines, internet (fiber optics/4G) and television (satellite and cable).

== Climate ==
Climate data for Apiaí, elevation 914 m (2,999 ft), (2011–2020 normals, extremes 2011–2022)
Month	Jan	Feb	Mar	Apr	May	Jun	Jul	Aug	Sep	Oct	Nov	Dec	Year
Record high °C (°F)	40.0 (104.0)	35.0 (95.0)	36.0 (96.8)	34.5 (94.1)	31.5 (88.7)	29.1 (84.4)	28.8 (83.8)	35.0 (95.0)	34.3 (93.7)	35.5 (95.9)	34.1 (93.4)	35.0 (95.0)	40.0 (104.0)
Mean daily maximum °C (°F)	27.6 (81.7)	27.4 (81.3)	25.5 (77.9)	25.0 (77.0)	21.5 (70.7)	19.8 (67.6)	20.4 (68.7)	21.0 (69.8)	22.8 (73.0)	23.8 (74.8)	24.2 (75.6)	26.6 (79.9)	23.8 (74.8)
Daily mean °C (°F)	22.5 (72.5)	22.5 (72.5)	21.0 (69.8)	19.9 (67.8)	16.8 (62.2)	14.9 (58.8)	14.8 (58.6)	15.5 (59.9)	17.5 (63.5)	18.9 (66.0)	19.5 (67.1)	21.7 (71.1)	18.8 (65.8)
Mean daily minimum °C (°F)	17.5 (63.5)	17.5 (63.5)	16.5 (61.7)	14.7 (58.5)	12.1 (53.8)	10.0 (50.0)	9.1 (48.4)	10.0 (50.0)	12.2 (54.0)	14.0 (57.2)	14.9 (58.8)	16.8 (62.2)	13.8 (56.8)
Record low °C (°F)	12.1 (53.8)	10.9 (51.6)	10.9 (51.6)	4.1 (39.4)	1.2 (34.2)	−1.1 (30.0)	−3.3 (26.1)	1.3 (34.3)	3.5 (38.3)	8.3 (46.9)	5.3 (41.5)	8.4 (47.1)	−3.3 (26.1)
Average precipitation mm (inches)	196.3 (7.73)	168.4 (6.63)	151.8 (5.98)	81.2 (3.20)	94.5 (3.72)	128.1 (5.04)	71.7 (2.82)	82.0 (3.23)	88.8 (3.50)	149.7 (5.89)	145.0 (5.71)	174.5 (6.87)	1,532 (60.32)
Average precipitation days (≥ 1.0 mm)	20.8	18.5	20.3	11.7	13.7	14.0	12.3	11.4	13.4	16.8	18.3	18.9	190.1
Source: Centro Integrado de Informações Agrometeorológicas

== See also ==
- List of municipalities in São Paulo
