= Iporanga =

- Municipality
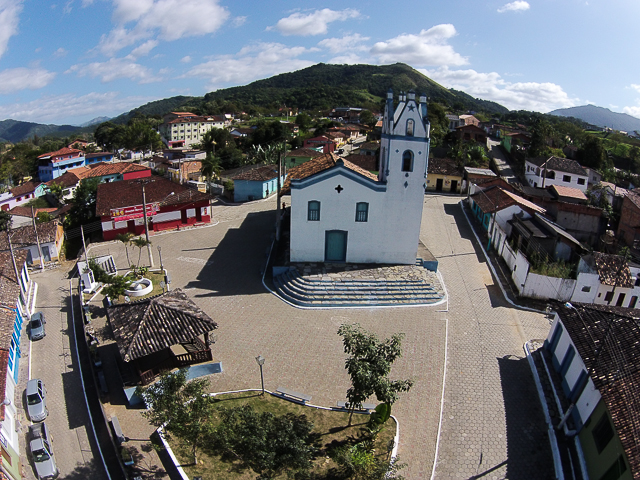

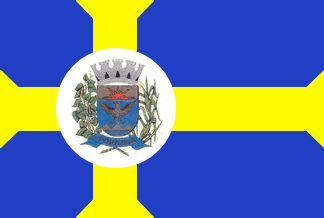
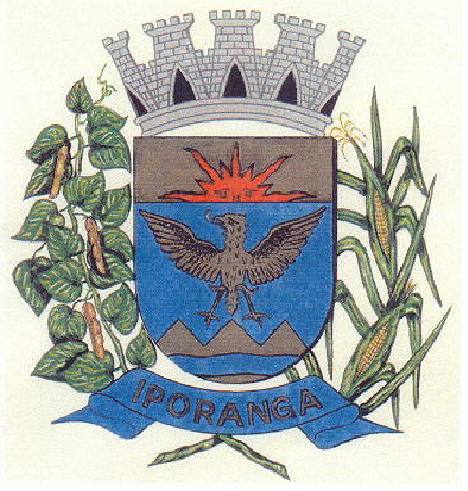
- Flag Coat of arms

- Location in São Paulo state

- Location in Brazil
- Coordinates: 24°35′08″S 48°35′35″W
- Country: Brazil
- Region: Southeast
- State: São Paulo

Area
  - Total: 1,152 km^{2} (445 sq mi)
- Elevation: 81 m (266 ft)

Population (2020)
  - Total: 4,199
  - Density: 3.645/km^{2} (9.440/sq mi)
- Time zone: UTC−3 (BRT)

Iporanga is a municipality in the state of São Paulo in Brazil. The population is 4,199 (2020 est.) in an area of 1152 km^{2}. The elevation is 81 m.

Iporanga contains parts of the Alto Ribeira and Baixo Ribeira sub-basins of the Ribeira de Iguape River basin. The municipality contains part of the 488,865-hectare (1,208,010-acre) Serra do Mar Environmental Protection Area, created in 1984. It contains part of the 41,704-hectare (103,050-acre) Intervales State Park, created in 1995. It contains part of the 40,175-hectare (99,270-acre) Caverna do Diabo State Park, created in 2008. It contains 55% of the 64,625-hectare (159,690-acre) Quilombos do Médio Ribeira Environmental Protection Area, established in 2008.

== Media ==
In telecommunications, the city was served by Companhia de Telecomunicações do Estado de São Paulo until 1975, when it began to be served by Telecomunicações de São Paulo. In July 1998, this company was acquired by Telefónica, which adopted the Vivo brand in 2012.

The company is currently an operator of cell phones, fixed lines, internet (fiber optics/4G) and television (satellite and cable).

== See also ==
- List of municipalities in São Paulo

== Demographics ==
Iporanga is a small municipality in São Paulo's interior, located in the Alto Ribeira region, with an estimated population of 4,083 inhabitants in 2025."Cities and States - IBGE". IBGE. The municipality has a territorial area of 1,152.059 km² and one of the region's lowest demographic densities, with 3.51 inhabitants/km² according to 2022 data."Municipal Panorama". IBGE.

The reduced population and low density reflect the municipality's environmental preservation character, which is practically a continuum of the Atlantic Forest ecosystem. Iporanga is one of São Paulo's best-preserved municipalities environmentally.

== Economy ==
Iporanga's economy is based on small-scale agricultural activities, sustainable extraction, and ecological tourism. The per capita GDP is R$ 17,505.86 (2023 data), reflecting an economy based on natural resources and tourism."Economic Indicators - IBGE". IBGE. Nature tourism and ecotourism are growing components of the municipal economy.

== Tourism ==
Iporanga is an important ecotourism and adventure destination in Brazil, home to the Alto Ribeira State Touristic Park (PETAR), one of São Paulo's main ecotourism attractions. The municipality offers caving, rappelling, hiking through preserved Atlantic Forest, and cave exploration. Proximity to other ecological points of interest makes Iporanga an essential destination for nature-interested visitors.

== Infrastructure ==
Iporanga is connected through state highways to the region. The municipality has adequate infrastructure for tourist accommodations, restaurants, and ecotourism support services. Basic healthcare, education, and utility services are available. Infrastructure is planned to minimize environmental impact.

== Education ==
Iporanga offers kindergarten and elementary education through local public institutions. The municipality has schools serving the student population with curriculum also focused on environmental education. Access to secondary education is facilitated by proximity to larger urban centers.
