= Capão Bonito =

Municipality in the state of São Paulo in Brazil

- Municipality
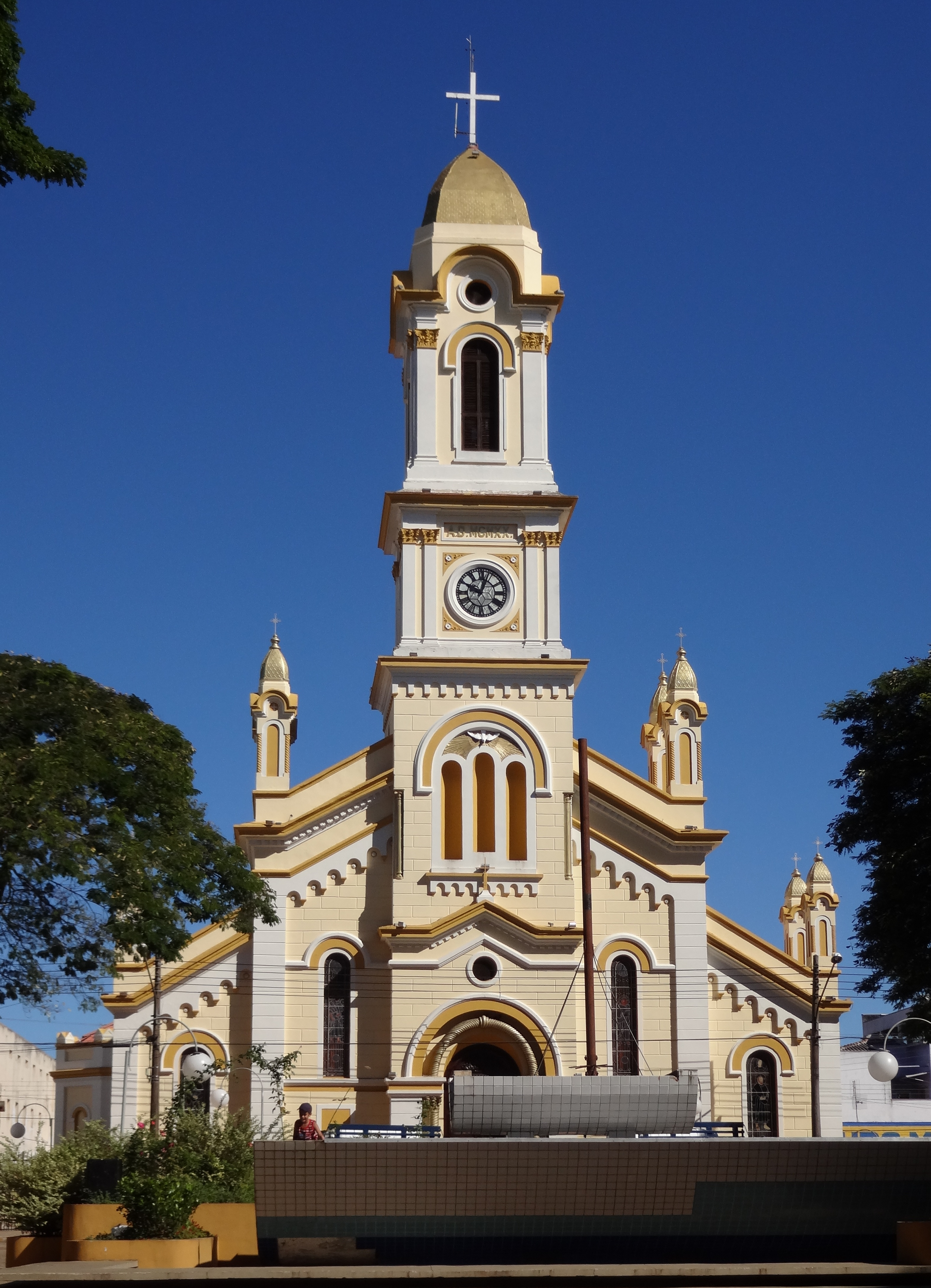
- Igreja Matriz

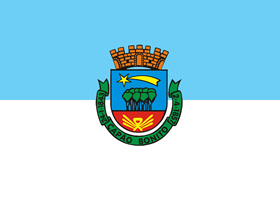
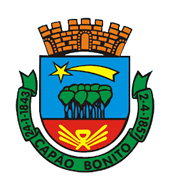
- Flag Coat of arms

- Location in São Paulo state

- Location in Brazil
- Coordinates: 24°0′21″S 48°20′58″W
- Country: Brazil
- Region: Southeast
- State: São Paulo

Area
  - Total: 1,640 km^{2} (630 sq mi)

Population (2020)
  - Total: 47,118
  - Density: 28.7/km^{2} (74.4/sq mi)
- Time zone: UTC-03:00 (BRT)
  - Summer (DST): UTC-02:00 (BRST)

Capão Bonito is a municipality in the state of São Paulo in Brazil. The population is 47,118 (2020 est.) in an area of 1,640 km^{2} (630 sq mi). The elevation is 705 m.

== Geography ==
The municipality contains part of the 37,644-hectare (93,020-acre) Carlos Botelho State Park, created in 1982. It contains part of the 488,865-hectare (1,208,010-acre) Serra do Mar Environmental Protection Area, created in 1984. It also contains the 22,269-hectare (55,030-acre) Nascentes do Paranapanema State Park, created in 2012.

== Media ==
In telecommunications, the city was served by Companhia de Telecomunicações do Estado de São Paulo until 1975, when it began to be served by Telecomunicações de São Paulo. In July 1998, this company was acquired by Telefónica, which adopted the Vivo brand in 2012.

The company is currently an operator of cell phones, fixed lines, internet (fiber optics/4G) and television (satellite and cable).

== See also ==
- List of municipalities in São Paulo
