= Tapiraí, São Paulo =

Tapiraí
- Municipality
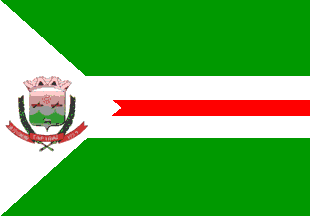
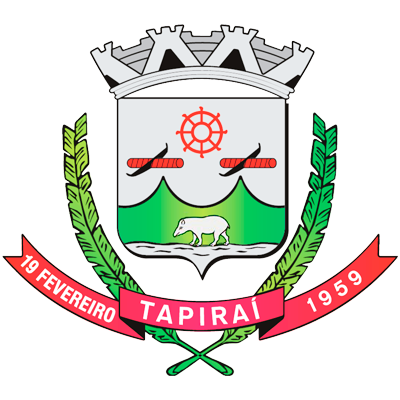
- Flag Coat of arms

- Location in São Paulo state

- Location in Brazil
- Coordinates: 23°57′50″S 47°30′25″W
- Country: Brazil
- Region: Southeast Brazil
- State: São Paulo
- Metropolitan Region: Sorocaba

Area
  - Total: 755.10 km^{2} (291.55 sq mi)
- Elevation: 875 m (2,871 ft)

Population (2020)
  - Total: 7,766
  - Density: 10.28/km^{2} (26.64/sq mi)
- Time zone: UTC−3 (BRT)

Tapiraí is a municipality in the state of São Paulo in Brazil. It is part of the Metropolitan Region of Sorocaba. The population is 7,766 (2020 est.) in an area of 755.10 km^{2} (291.55 sq mi). The elevation is 875 m.

== Geography ==
The city is located in a UNESCO Biosphere Reserve (UNESCO 1992). There are many natural touristic attractions available to tourists during the summer and during the winter the city turns into an escape from the busy days and nights of the big cities surrounding Tapiraí. Tourism in the city is still in a development phase, however, the city already counts with a tourist office and companies specialized in adventure sports like rafting and canoeing.

The municipality contains part of the 488,865-hectare (1,208,010-acre) Serra do Mar Environmental Protection Area, created in 1984.

== Media ==
In telecommunications, the city was served by Companhia de Telecomunicações do Estado de São Paulo until 1975, when it began to be served by Telecomunicações de São Paulo. In July 1998, this company was acquired by Telefónica, which adopted the Vivo brand in 2012.

The company is currently an operator of cell phones, fixed lines, internet (fiber optics/4G) and television (satellite and cable).

== See also ==
- List of municipalities in São Paulo
- Interior of São Paulo
