= Juquiá =

- Municipality
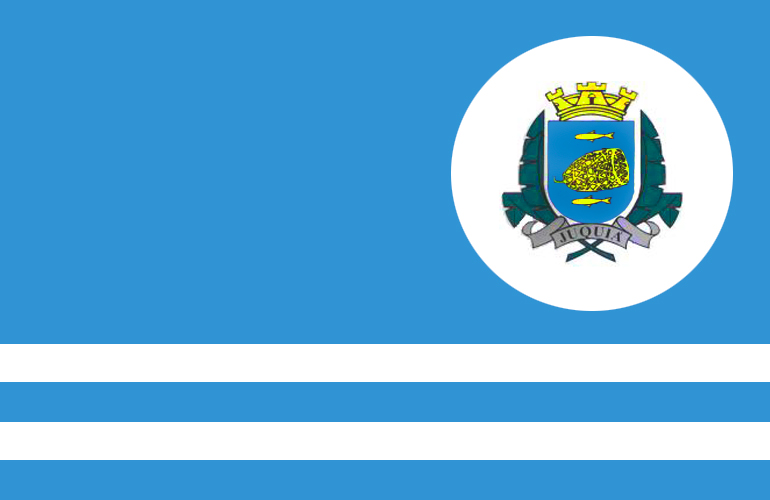
- Flag

- Location in São Paulo state

- Location in Brazil
- Coordinates: 24°19′15″S 47°38′5″W
- Country: Brazil
- Region: Southeast
- State: São Paulo

Area
  - Total: 813 km^{2} (314 sq mi)

Population (2020)
  - Total: 18,718
  - Density: 23.0/km^{2} (59.6/sq mi)
- Time zone: UTC−3 (BRT)

Juquiá is a municipality in the state of São Paulo in Brazil. The population is 18,718 (2020 est.) in an area of 813 km^{2}. The elevation is 17 m.

== History ==
The municipality was created by state law in 1948.

Map of the state of São Paulo (1948).

== Geography ==
The municipality contains part of the 488,865-hectare (1,208,010-acre) Serra do Mar Environmental Protection Area, created in 1984.

== Media ==
In telecommunications, the city was served by Telecomunicações de São Paulo. In July 1998, this company was acquired by Telefónica, which adopted the Vivo brand in 2012. The company is currently an operator of cell phones, fixed lines, internet (fiber optics/4G) and television (satellite and cable).

== See also ==
- List of municipalities in São Paulo
