= Eldorado, São Paulo =

Municipality in the state of São Paulo in Brazil

Eldorado
- Municipality

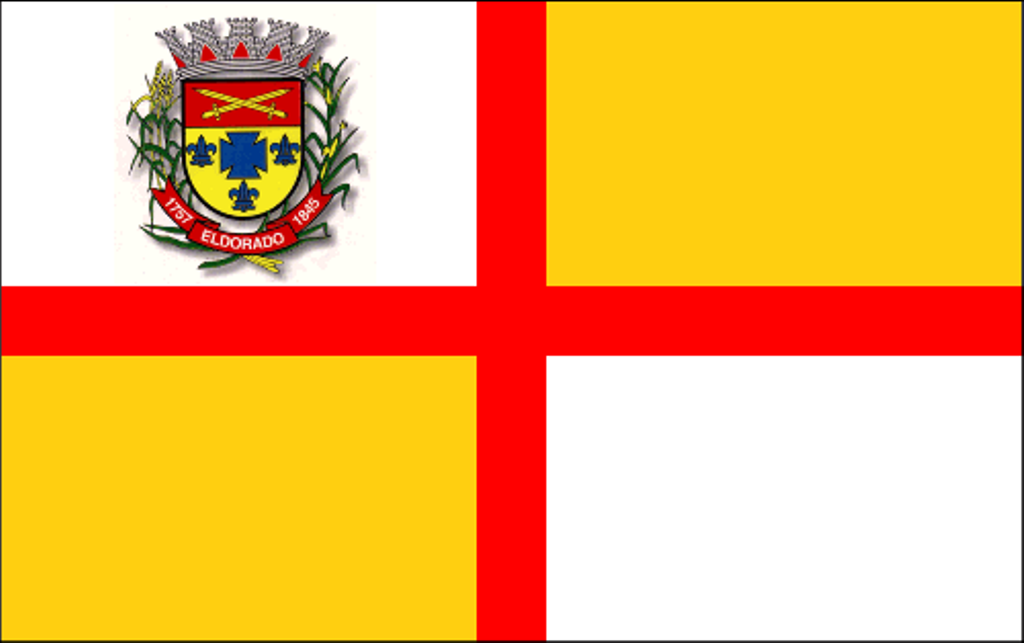
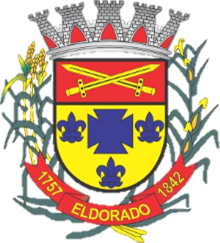
- Flag Coat of arms

- Location in São Paulo state

- Location in Brazil
- Coordinates: 24°31′12″S 48°6′29″W
- Country: Brazil
- Region: Southeast
- State: São Paulo

Government
  - Mayor: Durval Adelio de Morais

Area
  - Total: 1,654 km^{2} (639 sq mi)

Population (2020)
  - Total: 15,544
  - Density: 9.398/km^{2} (24.34/sq mi)
- Time zone: UTC−3 (BRT)

Eldorado (Xiririca before 1948) is a municipality in the state of São Paulo in Brazil. The population is 15,544 (2020 est.) in an area of 1654 km^{2}. Eldorado is one of 29 cities in São Paulo officially recognized as a touristic city, which gives it extra funding.

== Geography ==
Eldorado is situated on the Ribeira de Iguape River. The state highways SP-165 and SP-193 pass through the town.

The municipality contains part of the 488,865-hectare (1,208,010-acre) Serra do Mar Environmental Protection Area, created in 1984. It contains part of the 41,704-hectare (103,050-acre) Intervales State Park, created in 1995. It contains part of the 40,175-hectare (99,270-acre) Caverna do Diabo State Park, created in 2008. This park contains the largest cave in São Paulo, Caverna do Diabo (The Devil's Cave). The municipality contains 41% of the 64,625-hectare (159,690-acre) Quilombos do Médio Ribeira Environmental Protection Area, established in 2008.

== People ==
=== Demographics ===
Census - 2000

Total Population: 14,134

- Urban: 6,974
- Rural: 7,160
- Male: 7,337
- Female: 6,797

Density (inhabitants/km^{2}): 8.53

Infant Mortality (per 1000): 19.12

Life Expectancy: 69.57

Birth Rate: 3.50

Literacy Rate: 85.65%

Human Development Index (HDI-M): 0.733

- HDI-M Income: 0.633
- HDI-M Longevity: 0.743
- HDI-M Education: 0.823

(Source: IPEADATA)

=== Notable people ===
- Francisca Júlia da Silva, Brazilian poet born in Eldorado on 31 August 1871.

== Media ==
In telecommunications, the city was served by Companhia de Telecomunicações do Estado de São Paulo until 1975, when it began to be served by Telecomunicações de São Paulo. In July 1998, this company was acquired by Telefónica, which adopted the Vivo brand in 2012.

The company is currently an operator of cell phones, fixed lines, internet (fiber optics/4G) and television (satellite and cable).

== See also ==
- List of municipalities in São Paulo
