= Nascentes do Paranapanema State Park =

State park in São Paulo, Brazil

- Parque Estadual Nascentes do Paranapanema
- IUCN category II (national park)
- Location within Brazil
- Nearest city: Capão Bonito, São Paulo
- Coordinates: 24.15°S 48.203333°W
- Area: 22,268.94 hectares (55,027.7 acres)
- Designation: State park
- Created: 21 June 2012
- Administrator: Secretário do Meio Ambiente SP

The Nascentes do Paranapanema State Park (Portuguese: Parque Estadual Nascentes do Paranapanema is a state park in the state of São Paulo, Brazil. It protects part of the largest remnant of Atlantic Forest in Brazil.

== Location ==
The Nascentes do Paranapanema State Park is in the municipality of Capão Bonito, São Paulo. It has an area of 22,268.94 hectares (55,027.7 acres) of Atlantic Forest covering the sources of the Paranapanema River. The park is in a mountainous area, and much of its territory is in the buffer zones of the Carlos Botelho and Intervales state parks. The region contains one of the best preserved remnants of Atlantic Forest in Brazil, and shelters many endangered species of flora and fauna. It also has a rich historical heritage and holds various tourist attractions. It is part of a biological corridor, or continuum, recognized by UNESCO as a biosphere reserve.

== History ==
The Nascentes do Paranapanema State Park was announced during the June 2012 United Nations Conference on Sustainable Development (Rio+20). The new park and other units would make up the Paranapiacaba Conservation Units Mosaic, a forest massif of over 250,000 hectares (620,000 acres). São Paulo state decree 58.148 of 21 June 2012 created the state park and the mosaic. The objectives were protection of biodiversity, water resources and the biological corridor of Paranapiacaba, forming a biological continuum to preserve its ecological processes and gene flows, and to support ecotourism, leisure and environmental education.

The park was expected to develop sustainable employment form ecological and cultural tourism in the region. The land was already owned by the state, and only ten residents had been identified, whose rights would be respected. The deputy mayor of Capão Bonito said the municipality should be compensated for "freezing" of part of the territory. Important mineral resources could not now be extracted, two cement plants could not be expanded, and there were question over who would maintain rural roads in the area.

== Environment ==
The forest is extremely well preserved, and is home to the largest population of jaguars (Panthera onca) in the Atlantic Forest. It includes other threatened species such as cougar (Puma concolor), South American tapir (Tapirus terrestris), bush dog (Speothos venaticus), pygmy brocket (Mazama nana) and southern muriqui (Brachyteles arachnoides). The connection between the various areas in the Paranapiacaba mosaic will help the species to survive. The jaguar tends to avoid areas frequented by man, which include areas used by hunters and gatherers of heart of palm in the reserve. It is estimated that there are just 250 individual jaguars in the states of Paraná, São Paulo and Rio de Janeiro, most of them in the mosaic area. There are more than 450 species of birds.

The country people of the region consider that the primates in the park are good to eat. In 2012 environmental police seized the bodies of two howler monkeys and one southern muriqui. The muriqui, the largest primate in the Americas, is strongly threatened with extinction. In March 2013 environmental police found a hunter's camp with a shack equipped with a stove and kitchen utensils. A monkey that had been cleaned and was ready to eat was found, and the carcasses of an armadillo, and threatened birds such as solitary tinamou (Tinamus solitarius), neotropical bellbird and toucans. The hunters escaped into the forest.

== Sources ==
- Alckmin, Geraldo; Covas, Bruno (22 June 2012), "Decreto nº 58.148, de 21 de Junho de 2012", Diário Oficial (in Portuguese), 122 (116), Government of São Paulo
- "Caçadores de macacos voltam a agir em parque estadual", UOL notícias (in Portuguese), 31 March 2013
- Nascentes do Paranapanema (in Portuguese), ISA: Instituto Socioambiental
- Protegendo Nascentes, Cavernas e Ecótonos: Criação e Ampliação de UCs no Corredor Ecológico de Paranapiacaba, SP (in Portuguese), RBMA
- Tomazela, José Maria (18 June 2012), "Governo de SP cria parque para proteger nascentes do Rio Paranapanema", O Estadão (in Portuguese), Sorocaba
