= Bahia interior forests =

Ecological zone in Brazil

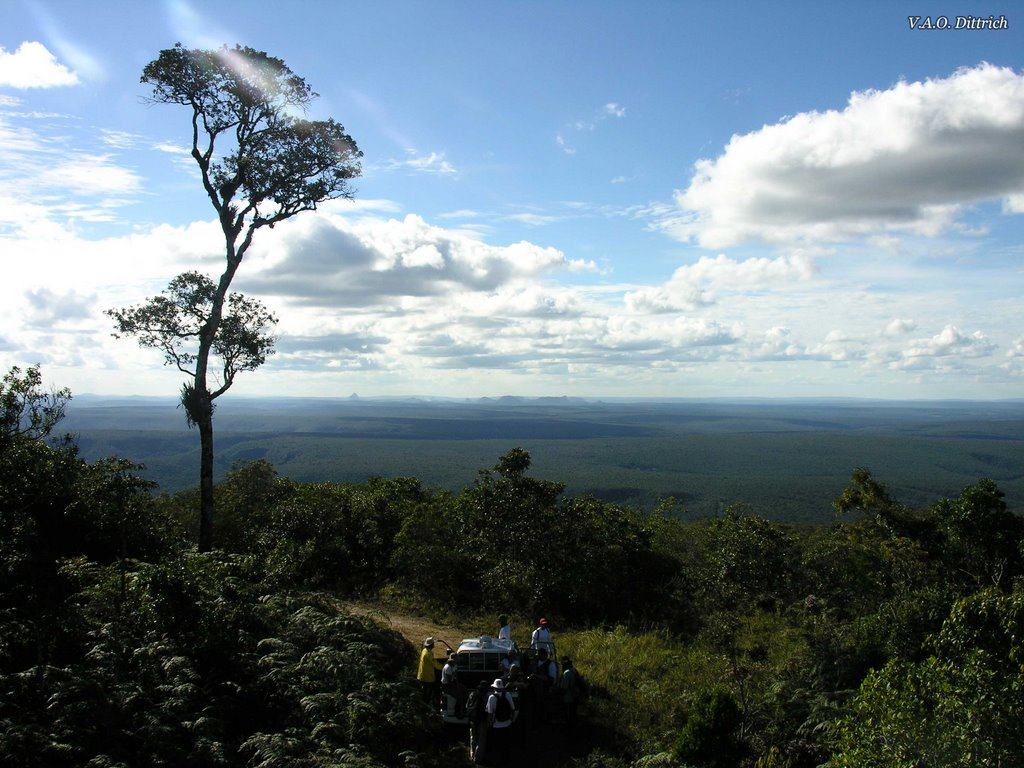
- Mata Escura Biological Reserve, in Minas Gerais, Brazil.

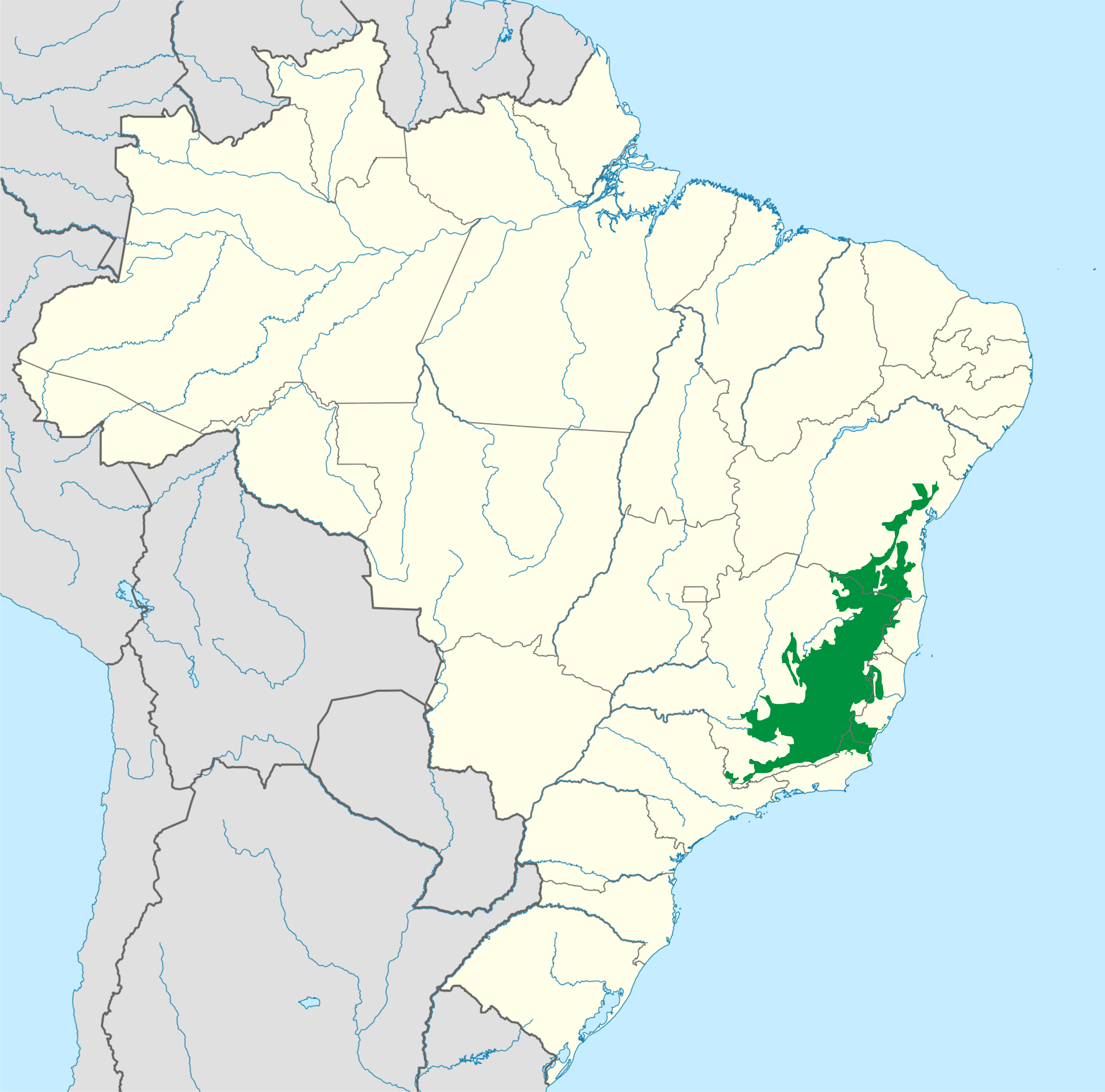
- Localization of Bahia interior forests ecoregion as delineated by WWF.

Ecology
- Biome: Atlantic Forest
- Borders: Serra do Mar coastal forests; Bahia coastal forests; Caatinga; Cerrado
- Bird species: 540
- Mammal species: 182

Geography
- Area: 230,880 km^{2} (89,140 mi^{2})
- Country: Brazil
- States: Bahia; Espírito Santo; Minas Gerais; Rio de Janeiro; São Paulo

Conservation
- Habitat loss: 69.3%
- Protected: 1.10%

The Bahia interior forests is an ecoregion of eastern Brazil. It is part of the larger Atlantic forests biome complex, and lies between the Bahia coastal forests and the dry shrublands and savannas of Brazil's interior.

== Setting ==
The Bahia interior forests cover an area of 230,000 square kilometers (89,000 sq mi), extending across portions of Bahia, Espírito Santo, Minas Gerais, Rio de Janeiro, and Sergipe states. The Bahia interior forests lie inland from the Bahia coastal forests, which extend approximately 150 km (93 mi) inland from the coast. The Bahia interior forests extend north to the São Francisco River, where they lie much closer to the coast, and are bounded on the west by the dry Caatinga shrublands. Moving south, the forests extend further inland to the Rio Paraíba do Sul, Rio Preto, and Rio Grande, which form the boundary with the Alto Paraná Atlantic forests to the southwest.

== Flora ==
Atlantic forest in Minas Gerais, interior Bahia and southern Espírito Santo, according to IBGE, consists of a semi-deciduous or deciduous forest. In this ecoregion is found a highly threatened species, the "Brazilian rosewood" (Dalbergia nigra).

== Fauna ==
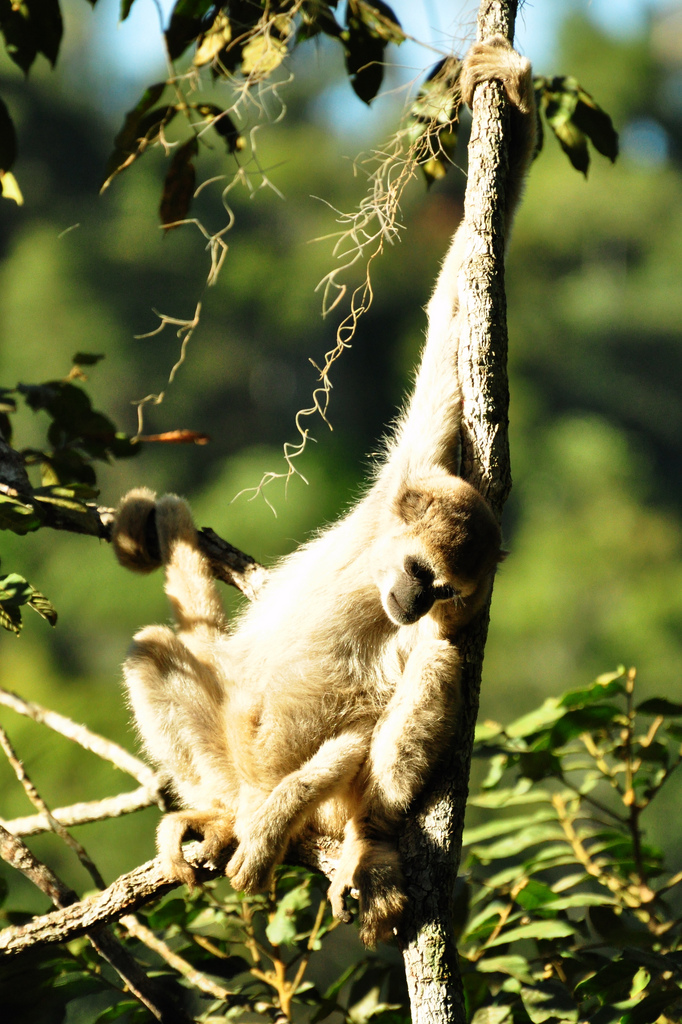
Northern muriqui is an endareged species of Bahia interior forests.

This ecoregion is poorly known. Recently, a new primate species was described, the Coimbra Filho's titi, and other primate, the Northern muriqui is endemic of Bahia interior forests ecoregion. The Stresemann's bristlefront, the rarest bird on the planet, is endemic to the Mata do Passarinho Reserve in the Bahia Interior Forests ecoregion.

== Conservation and threats ==
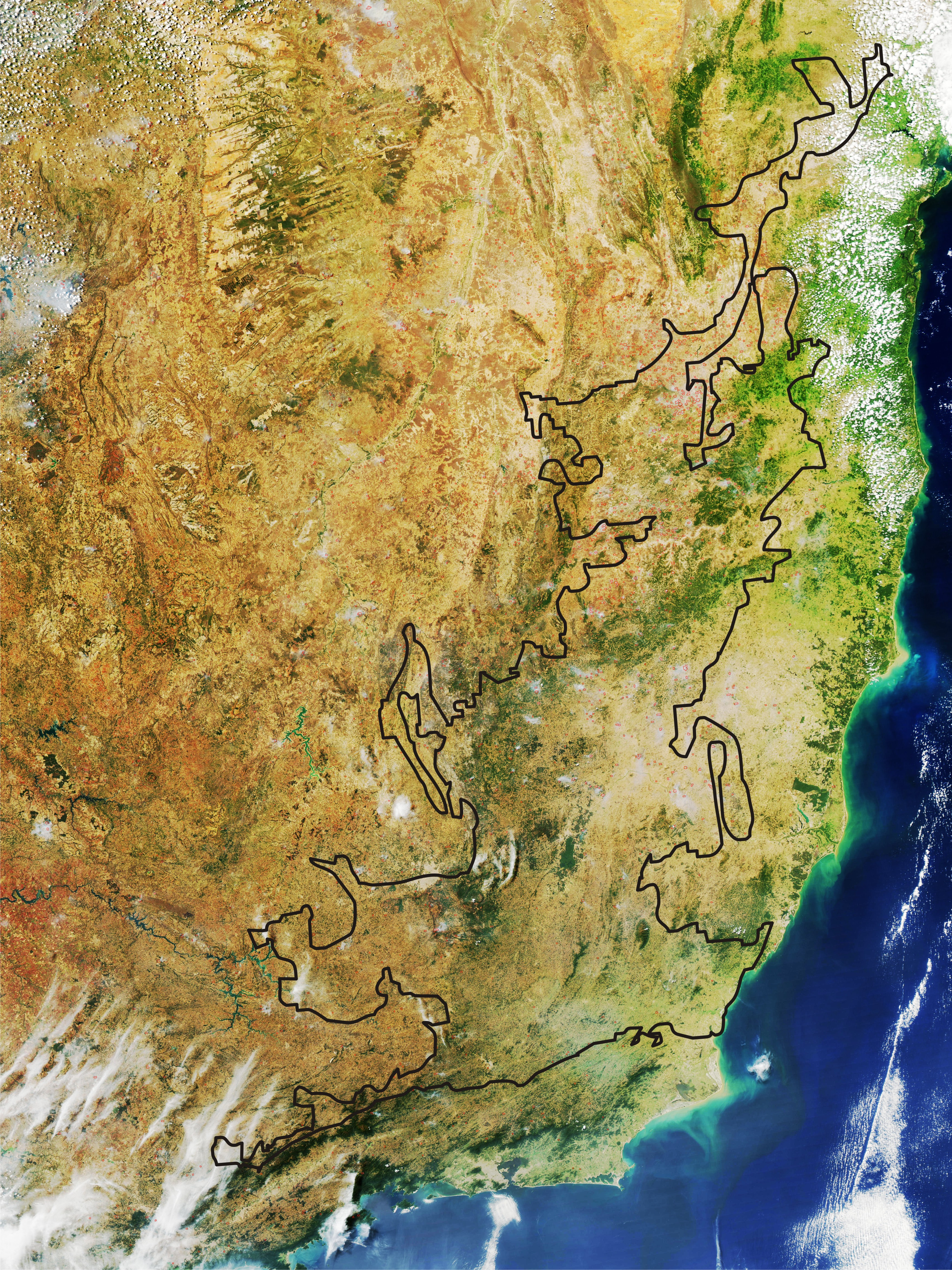
Satellite picture of Bahia interior forests ecoregion (black line). In this image, it's possible to observe the deforestation degree of the ecoregion.

Bahia interior forest is one of the most modified ecoregion in the atlantic forest region. Most forests remnants are less than 10 km^{2}, and even these are currently under strong pressure from anthropogenic activities, as wildfires, illegal logging and predatory hunting. Less than 2 percent of Bahia interior forests are protected as conservation units. The largest forest remnant of this ecoregion is the Rio Doce State Park, with 359 km^{2} of area.
