= Serra das Lontras National Park =

National park in Bahia, Brazil

- Parque Nacional da Serra das Lontras
- IUCN category II (national park)
- Location within Brazil
- Nearest city: Buerarema, Bahia
- Coordinates: 15°09′47″S 39°20′46″W
- Designation: National park)
- Administrator: Chico Mendes Institute for Biodiversity Conservation

The Serra das Lontras National Park (Portuguese: Parque Nacional da Serra das Lontras) is a national park in the state of Bahia, Brazil. It protects a rugged area of Atlantic Rainforest with a wide range of bird species, including several that are threatened with extinction.

== Location ==
The Serra das Lontras National Park is in the municipalities of Arataca (63%) and Una, Bahia (37%) to the south of Itabuna. BR-251 runs along the western boundary. It has an area of 11,336 hectares (28,010 acres). The park covers a Precambrian coastal range of high ridges that form a continuous mass over 400 metres (1,300 ft) high with peaks over 1,000 metres (3,300 ft). The range forms the watershed between the Una River and the Javi, Pratinha and Santo Antônio streams. It protects the headwaters of at least eight of the Una's tributaries. Water is supplied to various communities in the São José da Vitória municipality.

== Administration ==
The park was created by federal decree on 11 June 2010 and is administered by the Chico Mendes Institute for Biodiversity Conservation. It became part of the Central Atlantic Forest Ecological Corridor, created in 2002. The park is classed as IUCN protected area category II (national park). The objective is to preserve the biological wealth and to support scientific research, environmental education and interpretation, outdoors recreation and ecotourism.

== Environment ==
Average annual rainfall is 2,000 millimetres (79 in) and average temperature is 24 °C (75 °F). The park is in the Atlantic Forest biome. The forest has been selectively logged, but is generally in good condition. Vegetation ranges from lowlands rainforest with a high canopy reaching 30 metres (98 ft) in the lower parts to montane forests higher up. The forest becomes stunted above 800 metres (2,600 ft). The higher forest is rich in epiphytes and has great diversity of orchids.

Protected flora include Baptistonia truncata, Begonia itaguassuensis, Brachionidium restrepioides, Canistrum camacaense, Canistrum montanum, Davilla macrocarpa, Euterpe edulis, Heteropterys bullata, Hiraea bullata, Hirtella santosii, Houlletia brocklehurstiana, Huberia carvalhoi, Inga grazielae, Karawata gustavoi, Licania belemii, Octomeria geraensis, Paralychnophora bicolor, Portea nana, Solanum bahianum, Solanum restingae and Trichopilia santoslimae. Protected mammals include maned sloth (Bradypus torquatus), coastal black-handed titi (Callicebus melanochir), golden-bellied capuchin (Sapajus xanthosternos), golden-headed lion tamarin (Leontopithecus chrysomelas), bristle-spined rat (Chaetomys subspinosus) and cougar (Puma concolor).

330 species of bird have recorded, 16 of them globally threatened with extinction and 13 near threatened. Protected birds in the park include pink-legged graveteiro (Acrobatornis fonsecai), white-necked hawk (Buteogallus lacernulatus), harpy eagle (Harpia harpyja), red-browed amazon (Amazona rhodocorytha), brown-backed parrotlet (Touit melanonotus), golden-tailed parrotlet (Touit surdus), black-headed berryeater (Carpornis melanocephala), rufous-brown solitaire (Cichlopsis leucogenys), buff-throated purpletuft (Iodopleura pipra), Salvadori's antwren (Myrmotherula minor), band-tailed antwren (Myrmotherula urosticta), Bahia tyrannulet (Phylloscartes beckeri), ochre-marked parakeet (Pyrrhura cruentata), Temminck's seedeater (Sporophila falcirostris), buffy-fronted seedeater (Sporophila frontalis), long-tailed woodnymph (Thalurania watertonii), striated softtail (Thripophaga macroura) and white-winged cotinga (Xipholena atropurpurea).

== Sources ==
- Lamas, Ivana Reis; Crepaldi, Maria Otávia; Mesquita, Carlos Alberto Bernardo (2015), Uma Rede no Corredor (PDF) (in Portuguese), Conservação Internacional (CI-Brasil), ISBN 978-85-98830-28-5, archived from the original (PDF) on 2019-03-29
- Luís Fábio Silveira; Pedro Ferreira Develey; José Fernando Pacheco; Bret M.Whitney (2005), "Avifauna of the Serra das Lontras–Javi montane complex, Bahia, Brazil" (PDF), Cotinga, 24
- MPF/BA busca preservação do Parque Nacional da Serra das Lontras (in Portuguese), MPF, 29 July 2010
- Parna da Serra das Lontras (in Portuguese), Chico Mendes Institute for Biodiversity Conservation, archived from the original on 2021-04-12
- PARNA Serra das Lontras (in Portuguese), ISA: Instituto Socioambiental
- Unidade de Conservação: Parque Nacional da Serra das Lontras (in Portuguese), MMA: Ministério do Meio Ambiente
