= Una River (Una, Bahia) =

- Location within Brazil
- Native name: Rio Una (Portuguese)

Location
- Country: Brazil

Physical characteristics
- Mouth
  - location: Atlantic Ocean
  - coordinates: 15.229637°S 38.999881°W

Basin features
- River system: Una River

The Una River is a river of Bahia state in eastern Brazil. It discharges into the Atlantic Ocean between Canavieiras to the south and Ilhéus to the north.

Tributaries include the Aliança and São Pedro rivers. Part of the river basin is in the 18,715 hectares (46,250 acres) Una Biological Reserve, a strictly protected conservation unit in the Una municipality created in 1980. In its lower reaches the river flows through the western part of the Una Wildlife Refuge, which surrounds the biological reserve. At least eight of the tributaries rise in the 11,336 hectares (28,010 acres) Serra das Lontras National Park, created in 2010.

== See also ==
- List of rivers of Bahia
