= Costa das Algas Environmental Protection Area =

Protected area in Espírito Santo, Brazil

- Área de Proteção Ambiental Costa das Algas
- IUCN category V (protected landscape/seascape)
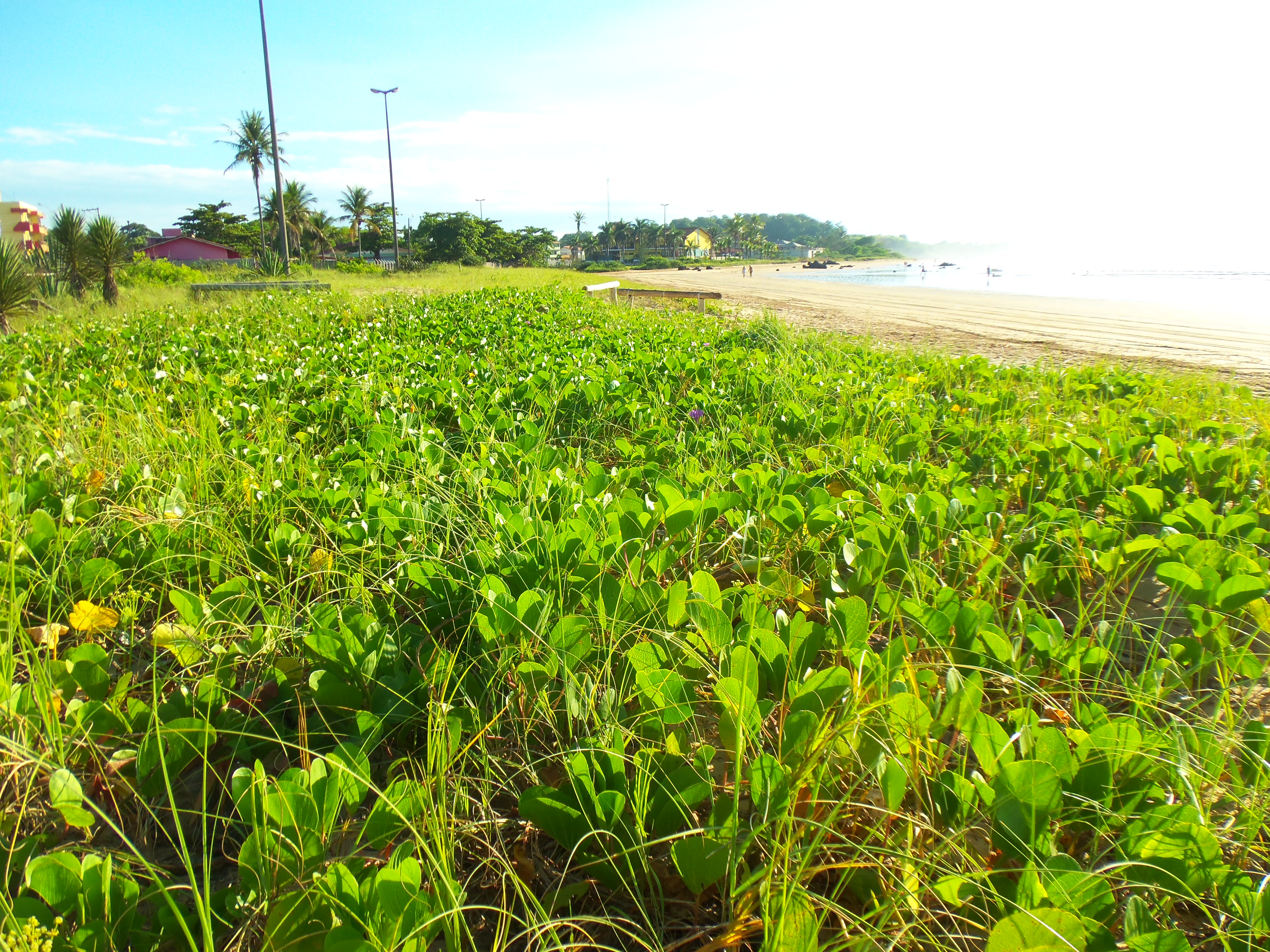
- Restinga, Praia Grande, Fundão

- Location within Brazil
- Nearest city: Nova Almeida, Espírito Santo
- Coordinates: 20.007421°S 40.019069°W
- Area: 112,545 hectares (278,100 acres)
- Designation: Environmental protection area
- Created: 17 June 2010
- Administrator: Chico Mendes Institute for Biodiversity Conservation

The Costa das Algas Environmental Protection Area (Portuguese: Área de Proteção Ambiental Costa das Algas) is an environmental protection area in the state of Espírito Santo, Brazil.

== Location ==
The Costa das Algas Environmental Protection Area (APA) protects the coast and sea off the municipalities of Aracruz, Fundão and Serra, Espírito Santo. It has an area of 112,545 hectares (278,100 acres). The APA includes the shoreline, but 99% covers the sea.

== History ==
The Costa das Algas Environmental Protection Area was created by federal decree on 17 June 2010. It is administered by the Chico Mendes Institute for Biodiversity Conservation. The APA became part of the Central Atlantic Forest Ecological Corridor, created later in 2002. The consultative council was created on 23 November 2010.

== Conservation ==
The APA is classed as IUCN protected area category V (protected landscape/seascape). The purpose is to protect the biological diversity and natural environment, to ensure sustainable use of natural resources by coastal communities in the region and to promote recovery of vegetation in the coastal area. The APA tries to protect and enhance the natural landscapes and scenic beauty by planning the process of occupation and land use on the sea front. The Jurong Aracruz Shipyard has developed a program of environmental communication and education for the APA and the adjacent Santa Cruz Wildlife Refuge, with approval and monitoring by ICMBio and IEMA.

== Sources ==
- APA Costa das Algas (in Portuguese), ICMBio: Chico Mendes Institute for Biodiversity Conservation
- APA Costa das Algas (in Portuguese), ISA: Instituto Socioambiental
- ICMBio apresenta Unidades de Conservação Federais (in Portuguese), Estaleiro Jurong Aracruz, 31 July 2010
- Lamas, Ivana Reis; Crepaldi, Maria Otávia; Mesquita, Carlos Alberto Bernardo (2015), Uma Rede no Corredor (PDF) (in Portuguese), Conservação Internacional (CI-Brasil), ISBN 978-85-98830-28-5
- Unidade de Conservação: Área de Proteção Ambiental Costa das Algas (in Portuguese), MMA: Ministério do Meio Ambiente
