= Rodrigues Alves Park =

Environmental preservation area in Brazil

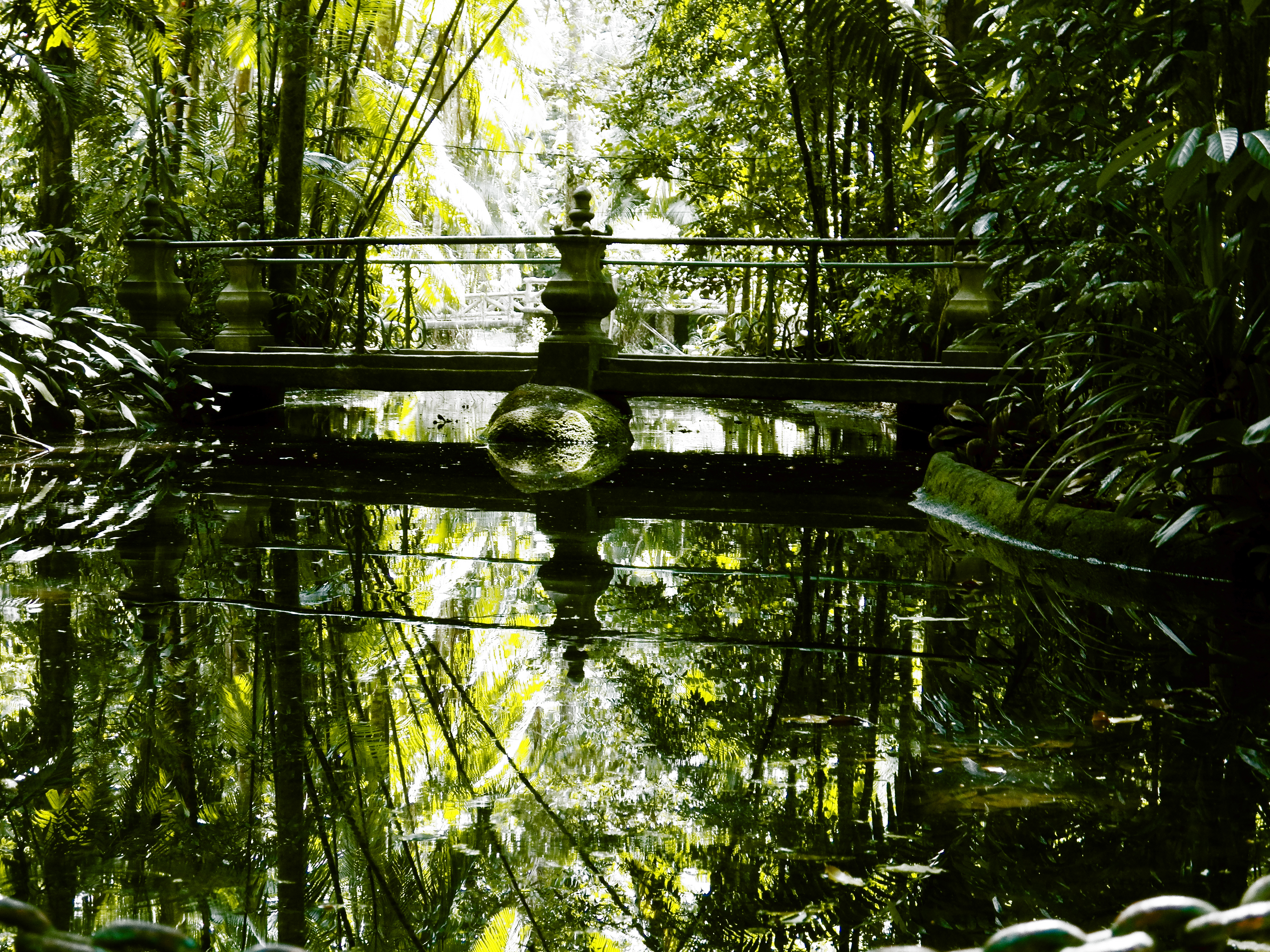
- Rodrigues Alves Park

- Location within Brazil

- Map of Rodrigues Alves Park
- Type: Public park
- Location: Belém, Pará, Brazil
- Coordinates: 1°25′50″S 48°27′23″W
- Area: 15 ha (37 acres; 0.058 mi^{2}; 0.15 km^{2})
- Opened: 25 August 1883
- Owner: Belém City Hall
- Visitors: 20,000 visitors a month
- Open: Tuesday to Sunday, 8:00 a.m. to 4:00 p.m.

The Rodrigues Alves Park and Botanical Garden of Amazonia, or simply Rodrigues Alves Park (initially called Marco da Légua Municipal Park) is a Brazilian environmental preservation area located in the Marco neighborhood, in the city of Belém, the capital of the state of Pará.

It was idealized by José Coelho da Gama e Abreu, the Baron of Marajó, and inaugurated in 1883, in the then Province of Grão-Pará, during the reign of Emperor Pedro II of Brazil.

It is home to more than 300 species of plant and 58 species of animal and receives an average of 20,000 visitors a month.

In 2008, it was elevated to the category of Botanical Garden, becoming part of the Botanic Gardens Conservation International (BGCI) network of national and international natural and historical preservation spaces.

== History ==
=== The Marco da Légua neighborhood ===
In 1625, due to Belém's strategic position at the mouth of the Amazon River, the Portuguese set up a commercial tax warehouse, the Casa de Ver-o-Peso, to collect taxes on European products imported into Belém, and those exported outside the Amazon (such as drugs from the sertão and beef from the island of Marajó).

In 1627, the importance of the entrepôt increased with the creation of the first league patrimonial by Governor Francisco Coelho de Carvalho: a 4110-hectare portion of land (starting on the banks of the Pará and Guamá rivers) donated by the Portuguese Crown to the Belém City Council, to boost population growth towards the interior, in the region of the Caeté River inhabited since 1613 (now the municipality of Bragança), giving rise to the Marco da Légua neighborhood and leveraging a population increase.

The growing importance of the captaincy of Grão-Pará led to the State of Maranhão being renamed the State of Grão-Pará and Maranhão in 1654.

=== The municipal park ===
Map of Rodrigues Alves Park.

In August 1883, in the context of the Belle Époque, the Rodrigues Alves Park was inaugurated as a municipal park. This took place during the government of the intendant Antônio Lemos, on the then Bragança road or Marco da Légua road (now Almirante Barroso Avenue, where the construction of the Belém-Bragança Railway was taking place). The park marked the boundary of the city's first patrimonial league, consolidating its occupation.

The president of the province of Grão-Pará, José Coelho da Gama Abreu, the Baron of Marajó, who, inspired by the Bois de Boulogne in Paris, designed a replica in Belém, a symbol of the modernization of Belém at the time.

In 1929, the capital's senator and intendant, Antônio de Almeida Facióla (appointed by Governor Eurico de Freitas Vale), restored all the works of art and toys in the grove and completed the construction of the wall and railings around it.

In 2002, the park was provisionally registered as the Amazon Botanical Garden by the Brazilian Botanical Gardens Network.

== Flora ==
The park covers an area of 15 hectares, spread over a rectangular plot that preserves part of the nature that originated in the area before the expansion of Belém in the 1950s. Almost the entire site is covered in vegetation, with the rest covered by historic buildings and farm tracks. The vegetation consists of native forest from the period when the region was not occupied, an area preserved since the end of the 19th century, with plants and trees characteristic of the Amazon. It is estimated that 94% of the vegetation is native forest and 6% exotic plants, with over 10,000 trees of more than 300 species.

There are centenary trees in the park, such as a quariquara that is around 400 years old and a maçaranduba that is 150 years old. There are also white carapanauba, marupá, Pará rubber trees (the source of natural rubber), andiroba, used in the region for medicinal purposes, and endangered species such as cedro-faia, rajado angelim, and tanibuca.

== Fauna ==
The fauna is exclusively made up of animals from the Amazon rainforest, with animals in captivity or semi-captivity and a few in the wild (free fauna), bringing together around 435 animals. The fauna consists of various mammals (3 captives + 8 free fauna), birds (11 captivity+6 free fauna), amphibians (5 in free fauna), reptiles (10 captivity+7 free fauna), fishes (5 in captivity), and insects. It has a bird nursery. It also runs wildlife management programs and environmental education projects.

Among the birds that live in the native forest area are piranga and scarlet macaw, parrots, jandaias, marianhinas, maitaca, parakeets, maracanã, and the great blue macaw, an endangered species.

The chelonians that live there, among aquatic and terrestrial species, include tracajá, muçuã, Amazonian turtle, irapuca, jabuti machado, peremas, red-footed jabuti, and yellow-footed jabuti. For the reptiles, there are alligators.

Mammals present are the prego and cheiro monkeys, and Amazonian manatee.

== Historical heritage ==
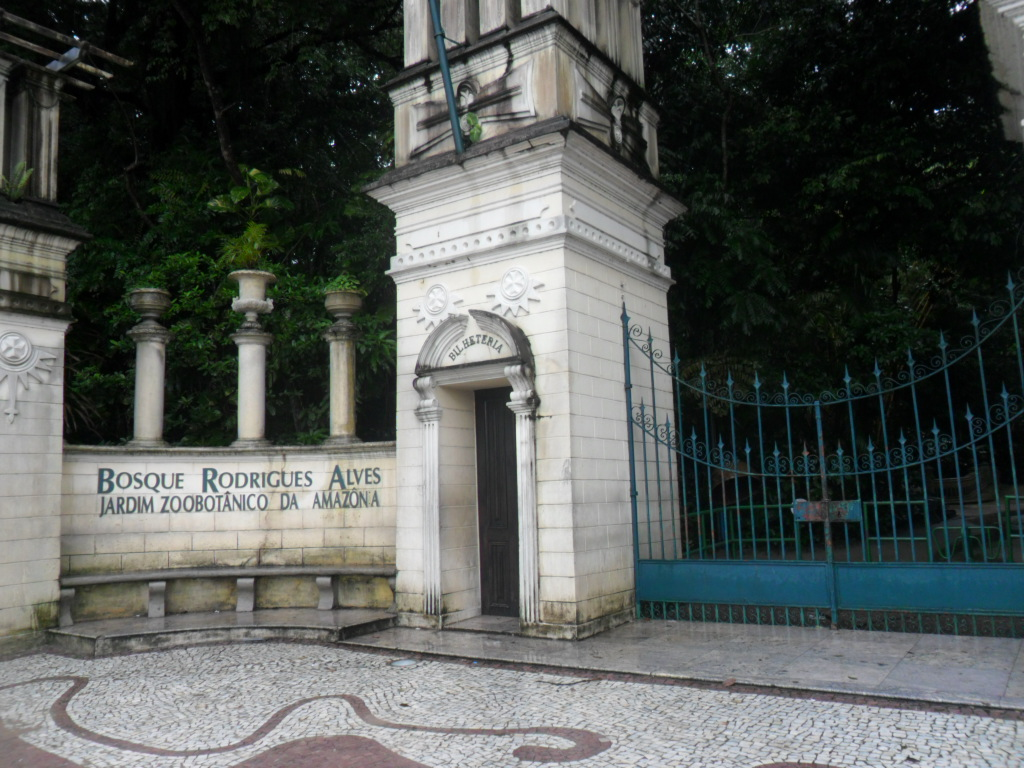
Entrance gate and ticket office.

The Rodrigues Alves Park has been listed as an architectural and landscape monument by the state since 1982.

The Park still preserves original 19th-century structures, such as the monumental gate at the main entrance, the monument to the municipal intendants, the statue to the legendary forest guardians Mapinguari and Curupira, the Chinese kiosk, the soapstone cave, and the artificial lakes.

In 1985, a 19th-century iron chalet was restored and transferred to the park, where it still stands today.

== See also ==
- Utinga State Park
- Metrópole da Amazônia Wildlife Refuge
- Amazon rainforest
