= Una Wildlife Refuge =

Wildlife refuge in Brazil

- Refúgio de Vida Silvestre de Una
- IUCN category III (natural monument or feature)
- Location within Brazil
- Nearest city: Una, Bahia
- Coordinates: 15.196111°S 39.178868°W
- Area: 23,261.85 hectares (57,481.3 acres)
- Designation: Wildlife refuge
- Created: 21 December 2007
- Administrator: Chico Mendes Institute for Biodiversity Conservation

The Una Wildlife Refuge (Portuguese: Refúgio de Vida Silvestre de Una) is a wildlife refuge in the state of Bahia, Brazil.

== Location ==
The Una Wildlife Refuge is in the municipalities of Una and Ilhéus, Bahia. It has an area of 23,261.85 hectares (57,481.3 acres). The refuge almost completely surrounds the Una Biological Reserve. Most of the local rural workers and landowners do not distinguish between the wildlife refuge and the biological reserve. The eastern section of the refuge adjoins the Atlantic Ocean. The Una River runs through the western section of the refuge.

== History ==
On 15 May 2006 the Brazilian Institute of Environment and Renewable Natural Resources (IBAMA) began public consultations on the proposed creation of the Una and Rio dos Frades wildlife refuges, as well as the proposed expansion of the Pau-Brazil and Descobrimento national parks and of the Una Biological Reserve. The Una Wildlife Refuge was created by federal decree on 21 December 2007 with an area of about 23,404 hectares (57,830 acres) in two separate areas to protect natural environments that ensure conditions for existence or reproduction of flora and local or migratory fauna. It became part of the Central Atlantic Forest Ecological Corridor, created in 2002.

== Sources ==
- Lamas, Ivana Reis; Crepaldi, Maria Otávia; Mesquita, Carlos Alberto Bernardo (2015), Uma Rede no Corredor (PDF) (in Portuguese), Conservação Internacional (CI-Brasil), ISBN 978-85-98830-28-5, archived from the original (PDF) on 2019-03-29
- Lisboa, Gilberto Santos; Jesus, Guilhardes de, Júnior; Melo Lisboa, Mateus de (2012), "As limitações administrativas da união no refúgio de vida silvestre de Una, Sul da Bahia", Direito Ambiental e Sociedade, 2 (1)
- Refúgio de Vida Silvestre de Una (in Portuguese), MMA: Ministerio de Meio Ambienta
- Reserva Biológica de Una (in Portuguese), MMA: Ministerio de Meio Ambienta
- RVS de Una (RVS) (in Portuguese), ISA: Instituto Socioambiental
