= Rio dos Frades Wildlife Refuge =

Wildlife refuge in Bahia, Brazil

- Refúgio de Vida Silvestre do Rio dos Frades
- IUCN category III (natural monument or feature)
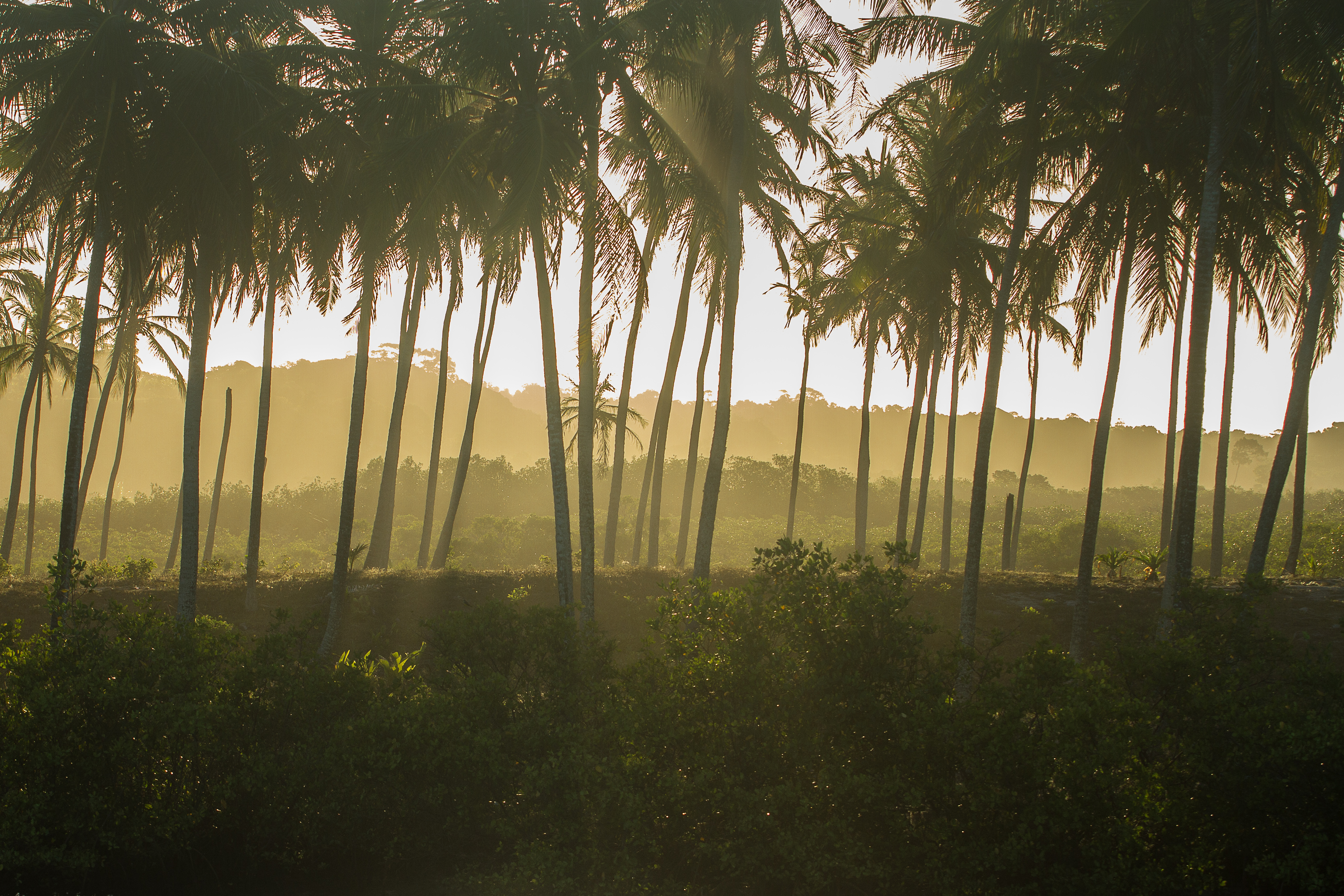
- Sunset in the refuge

- Location within Brazil
- Nearest city: Porto Seguro, Bahia
- Coordinates: 16°40′25″S 39°06′48″W
- Area: 894 hectares (2,210 acres)
- Designation: Wildlife refuge
- Created: 21 December 2007
- Administrator: Chico Mendes Institute for Biodiversity Conservation

The Rio dos Frades Wildlife Refuge (Portuguese: Refúgio de Vida Silvestre do Rio dos Frades) is a wildlife refuge in the state of Bahia, Brazil. It protects the land around the mouth of the Frades River. There is pressure, or opportunity, to develop the reserve for tourism.

== Location ==
The Rio dos Frades Wildlife Refuge is in the municipality of Porto Seguro, Bahia. It has an area of 894 hectares (2,210 acres). Nearby conservation units include the Pau Brasil National Park to the north, and the Monte Pascoal National Park and Corumbau Marine Extractive Reserve to the south. The reserve is within the Caraíva-Trancoso State Environmental Protection Area, defined on 24 November 2000. The reserve has a buffer zone of 2,982.06 hectares (7,368.8 acres).

== Environment ==
The reserve is on a sandy coastal plain bounded by a cliff inland. It is in the 436 square kilometres (168 sq mi) drainage basin of the Frades River, and protects the mouth of the river. Average annual rainfall is 1,400 millimetres (55 in). The vegetation is mainly restinga salt marsh, with shrubs and thickets. There are mangroves and many bromeliads and orchids. There is an endemic lizard named Cnemidophorus nativo.

The reserve is threatened by construction on private properties, which cover most of the reserve, and by Buffalo incursions. Tourism is being developed in the region, and the small beach at the river mouth may be attractive. Tourism has potential economic value for the local residents. The local people of Itaporanga use the reserve to access the beach and the river mouth for leisure and for fishing.

== History ==
On 15 May 2006 the Brazilian Institute of Environment and Renewable Natural Resources (IBAMA) began public consultations on the proposed creation of the Rio dos Frades and Una wildlife refuges, as well as the proposed expansion of the Pau-Brazil and Descobrimento national parks and of the Una Biological Reserve.

The Rio dos Frades Wildlife Refuge was created by federal decree on 21 December 2007 with the basic objective of preserving natural ecosystems of great ecological relevance and scenic beauty, enabling scientific research, education and environmental interpretation and supporting recreation in contact with nature. It is classed as IUCN protected area category III (natural monument or feature). It is administered by the Chico Mendes Institute for Biodiversity Conservation. It became part of the Central Atlantic Forest Ecological Corridor, created in 2002.

The consultative council was created on 21 July 2011. The consultative council included representatives of ICMBio and landowners, but the landowners were not actively participating due to lack of interest. As of 2014 the reserve had no management plan and was therefore not open to visitors.

== Sources ==
- Castro, Márcia Salustiano de; Bonecker, Ana Cristina T. (May 2013), Elaboração de estudo de socioeconomia e áreas correlatas para atender as necessidades no Refúgio de Vida Silvestre do Rio dos Frades: Produto 2 (PDF), Rio de Janeiro/RJ, archived from the original (PDF) on 2016-10-23
- Ferraz de Oliveira, Carlos Alfredo (August 2014), Diagnóstico sobre o turismo e uso público nas unidades de conservação federais do extremo sul da Bahia (PDF) (in Portuguese), Bahia: Conservação Internacional Brasil, archived from the original (PDF) on 2016-10-24
- Lamas, Ivana Reis; Crepaldi, Maria Otávia; Mesquita, Carlos Alberto Bernardo (2015), Uma Rede no Corredor (PDF) (in Portuguese), Conservação Internacional (CI-Brasil), ISBN 978-85-98830-28-5, archived from the original (PDF) on 2019-03-29
- Revis Rio dos Frades (in Portuguese), ICMBio: Chico Mendes Institute for Biodiversity Conservation, archived from the original on 2016-10-23
- RVS do Rio dos Frades (in Portuguese), ISA: Instituto Socioambiental
- RVS de Una (RVS) (in Portuguese), ISA: Instituto Socioambiental
- Unidade de Conservação: Refúgio de Vida Silvestre do Rio dos Frades (in Portuguese), MMA: Ministério do Meio Ambiente
