= Turbonilla aracruzensis =

Scientific classification
- Kingdom: Animalia
- Phylum: Mollusca
- Class: Gastropoda
- Family: Pyramidellidae
- Genus: Turbonilla
- Species: T. aracruzensis

Binomial name
- Turbonilla aracruzensis Pimenta & Absalao, 2004

Species of gastropod

Turbonilla aracruzensis is a species of sea snail, a marine gastropod mollusk in the family Pyramidellidae, the pyrams and their allies.

== Description ==
The shell appears white and grows to a length of 5.4 mm.

== Distribution ==
The type specimen was found in the Atlantic Ocean off Aracruz, Espírito Santo State, Brazil, at depths between 28 m and 69 m.
