= Arataca =

Municipality of Bahia, Brazil

Arataca Município de Arataca
- Municipality
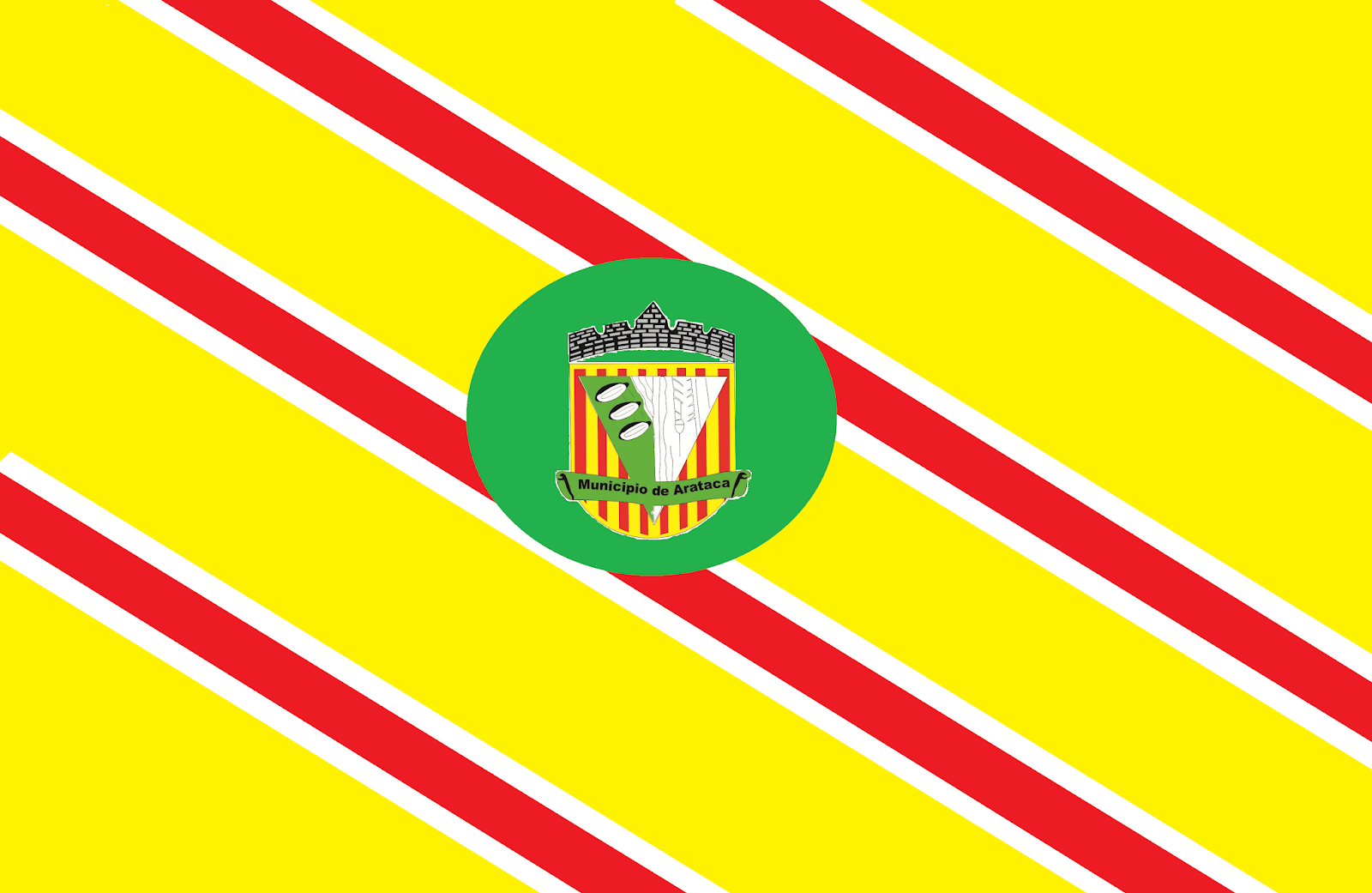
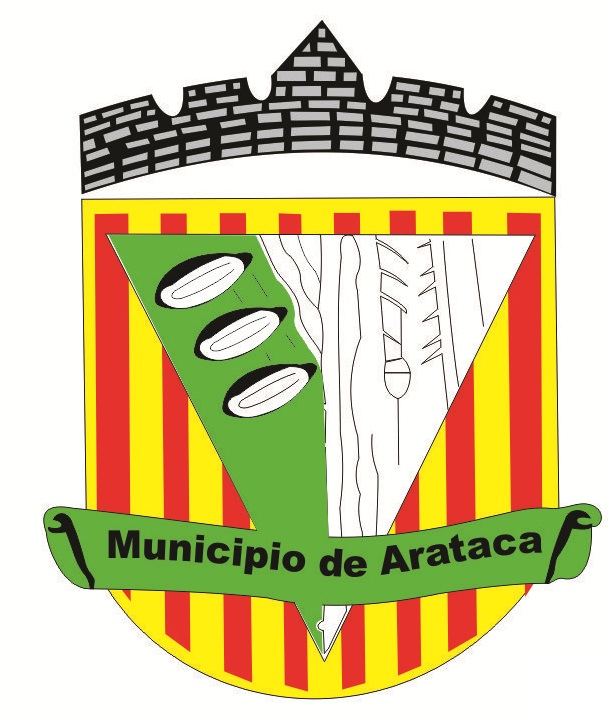
- Flag Coat of arms

- Location of Arataca in Bahia

- Location of Arataca in Brazil
- Coordinates: 15°15′46″S 39°24′50″W
- Country: Brazil
- Region: Northeast
- State: Bahia
- Founded: May 9, 1985

Government
  - Mayor: Fernando Mansur (2013-2016)

Area
  - Total: 435.96 km^{2} (168.33 sq mi)

Population (2020)
  - Total: 10,961
  - Density: 25.142/km^{2} (65.118/sq mi)
- Demonym: Arataquense
- Time zone: UTC−3 (BRT)

Arataca is a municipality in the state of Bahia in the North-East region of Brazil. Arataca covers 435.96 km^{2} (168.33 mi^{2}), and has a population of 10,961 with a population density of 27 inhabitants per square kilometer (70 inhabitants per square mile). It consists of two districts: Arataca, the municipal seat, and Itatingui.

The municipality contains part of the 11,336-hectare (28,010-acre) Serra das Lontras National Park, created in 2010.

== See also ==
- List of municipalities in Bahia
