= Mata do Passarinho Reserve =

The Mata do Passarinho Reserve (Portuguese: Songbird Forest) is an Atlantic Forest nature reserve in the Brazilian states of Minas Gerais and Bahia. The reserve is the last known area to contain Stresemann's bristlefront (Merulaxis stresemanni), a bird which is endemic to Brazil and listed as critically endangered by the International Union for Conservation of Nature (IUCN).

== History ==
The reserve was created in 2007 by Fundação Biodiversitas with the support of the American Bird Conservancy. In 2016 an additional 766 acres (310 ha) was added to bring the total area of the reserve to 2,352 acres (952 ha). The new area contains primary forest as well as secondary forest; areas that have not been grazed by cattle for over a decade.

== Geography ==
The reserve contains one of the last remnants of the Atlantic forest in northern Minas Gerais and southern Bahia and is surrounded by farmland. As of 2016 only 8% of the forest remains which originally extended along the Atlantic coast of Brazil from Rio Grande do Norte state in the north to Rio Grande do Sul state in the south, and inland as far as Paraguay and the Misiones Province of Argentina.

== Wildlife ==
Many endangered birds are found in the reserve and it is the only area to house Stresemann's bristlefront with fifteen or fewer individuals known to exist in the wild. Bahia tyrannulet (Phylloscartes beckeri), Banded cotinga (Cotinga maculata), Brown-backed parrotlet (Touit melanonotus), Hook-billed hermit (Glaucis dohrnii) and Red-browed parrot (Amazona rhodocorytha) are some of the other endangered birds in the reserve. Mammals include the Maned three-toed sloth (Bradypus torquatus) and Yellow-breasted Capuchin (Sapajus xanthosternos).
