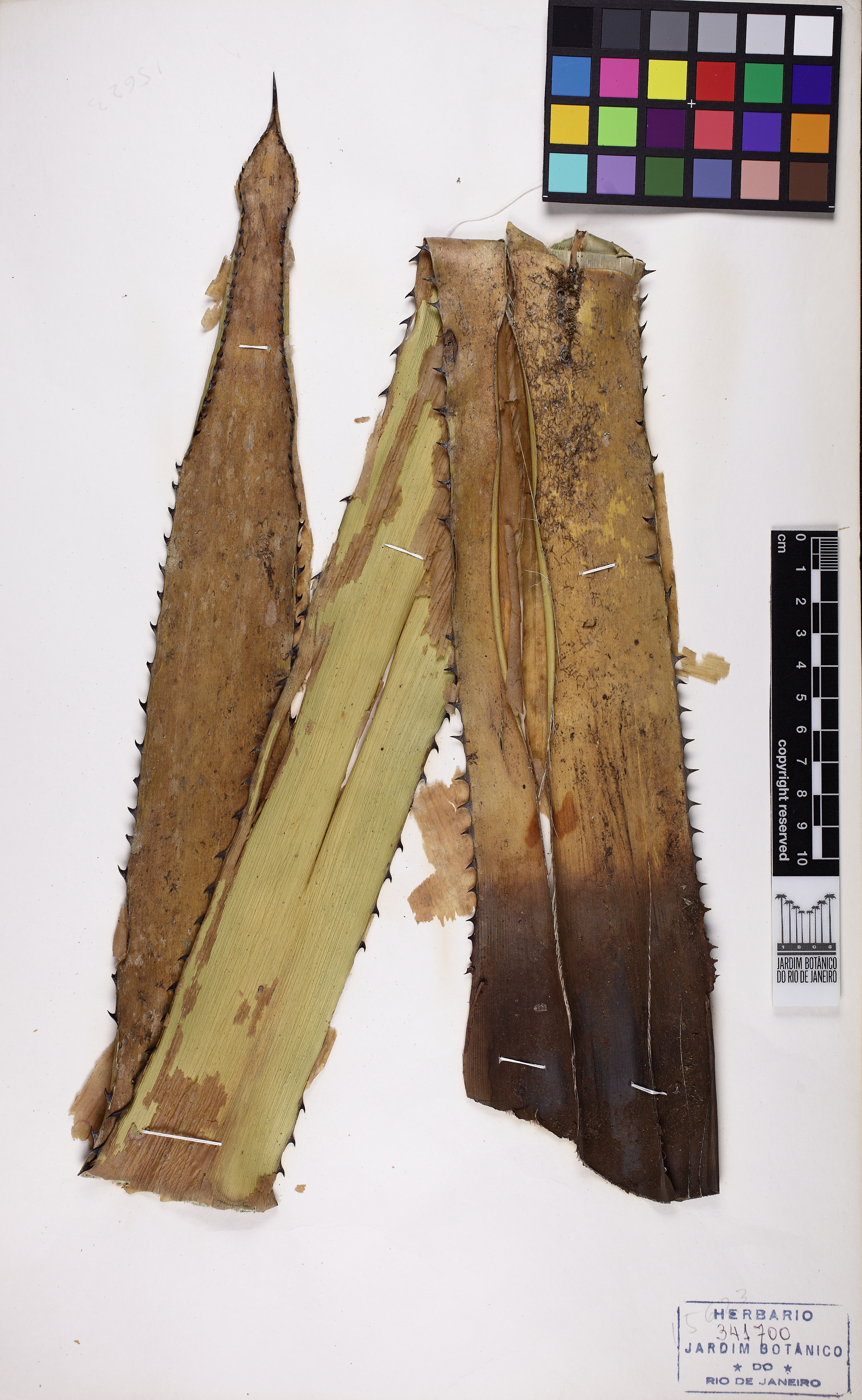

Scientific classification
- Kingdom: Plantae
- Clade: Tracheophytes
- Clade: Angiosperms
- Clade: Monocots
- Clade: Commelinids
- Order: Poales
- Family: Bromeliaceae
- Subfamily: Bromelioideae
- Genus: Karawata
- Species: K. prasinata

Binomial name
- Karawata prasinata (G.M.Sousa & Wand.) J.R.Maciel & G.M.Sousa

Synonyms
- Aechmea prasinata G.M.Sousa & Wand.

= Karawata prasinata =

Species of plant

Karawata prasinata is a species of flowering plant in the family Bromeliaceae, native to Brazil (the state of Espírito Santo). It was first described in 2015 as Aechmea prasinata.
