= Karawata nigribracteata =

Scientific classification
- Kingdom: Plantae
- Clade: Tracheophytes
- Clade: Angiosperms
- Clade: Monocots
- Clade: Commelinids
- Order: Poales
- Family: Bromeliaceae
- Subfamily: Bromelioideae
- Genus: Karawata
- Species: K. nigribracteata

Binomial name
- Karawata nigribracteata (J.R.Maciel, Louzada & M.Alves) J.R.Maciel & G.M.Sousa

Synonyms
- Aechmea nigribracteata J.R.Maciel, Louzada & M.Alves

Species of plant

Karawata nigribracteata is a species of flowering plant in the family Bromeliaceae, native to Brazil (the state of Bahia). It was first described in 2014 as Aechmea nigribracteata.
