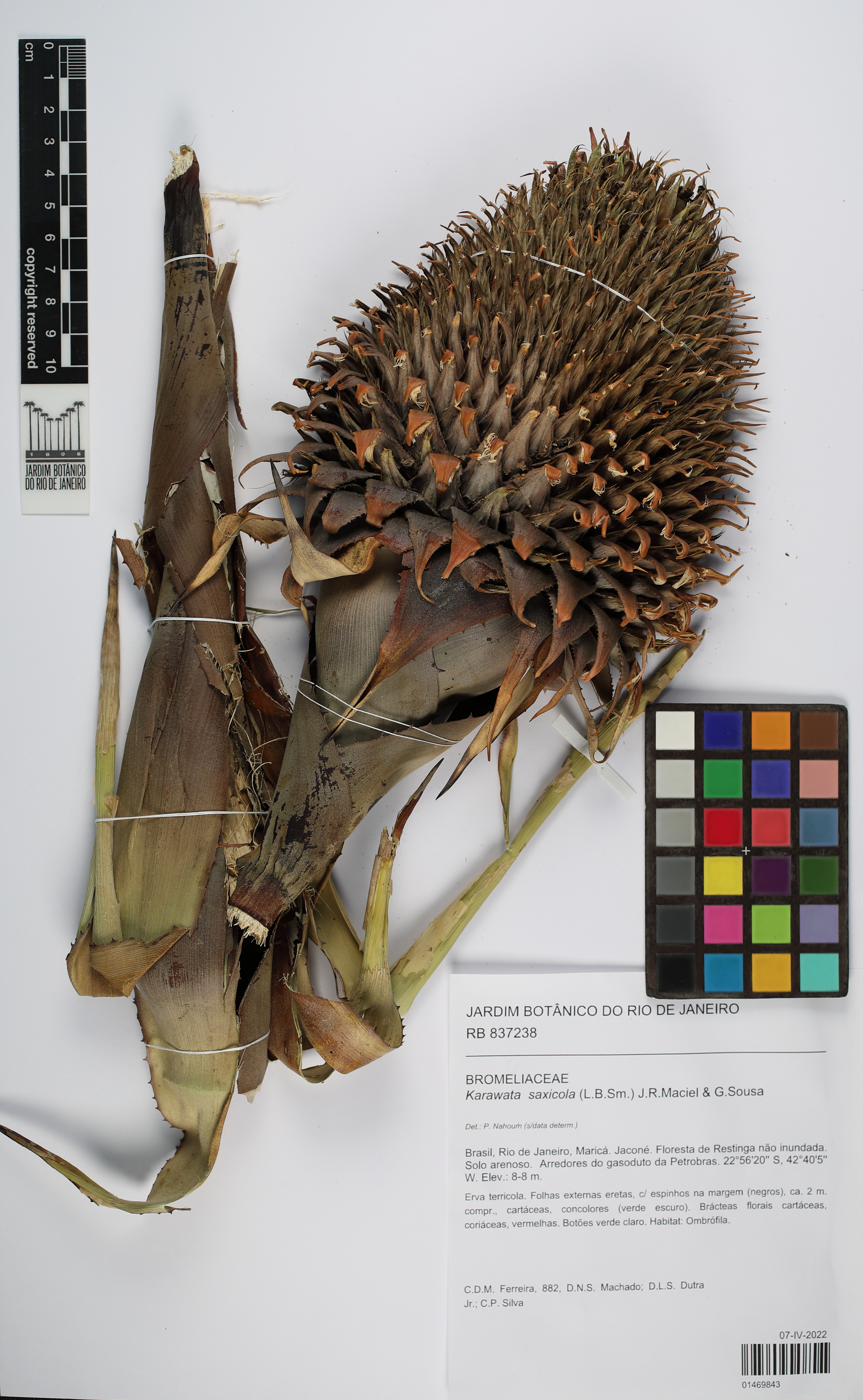

Scientific classification
- Kingdom: Plantae
- Clade: Tracheophytes
- Clade: Angiosperms
- Clade: Monocots
- Clade: Commelinids
- Order: Poales
- Family: Bromeliaceae
- Subfamily: Bromelioideae
- Genus: Karawata
- Species: K. saxicola

Binomial name
- Karawata saxicola (L.B.Sm.) J.R.Maciel & G.M.Sousa

Synonyms
- Aechmea saxicola L.B.Sm.; Chevaliera saxicola (L.B.Sm.) L.B.Sm. & W.J.Kress

= Karawata saxicola =

Species of flowering plant

Karawata saxicola is a species of flowering plant in the family Bromeliaceae, native to southeastern Brazil, in the states of Espírito Santo and Rio de Janeiro. It was first described by Lyman Bradford Smith in 1950 as Aechmea saxicola.
