= São José da Vitória =

Coordinates: 15°05′02″S 39°20′20″W

- Municipality
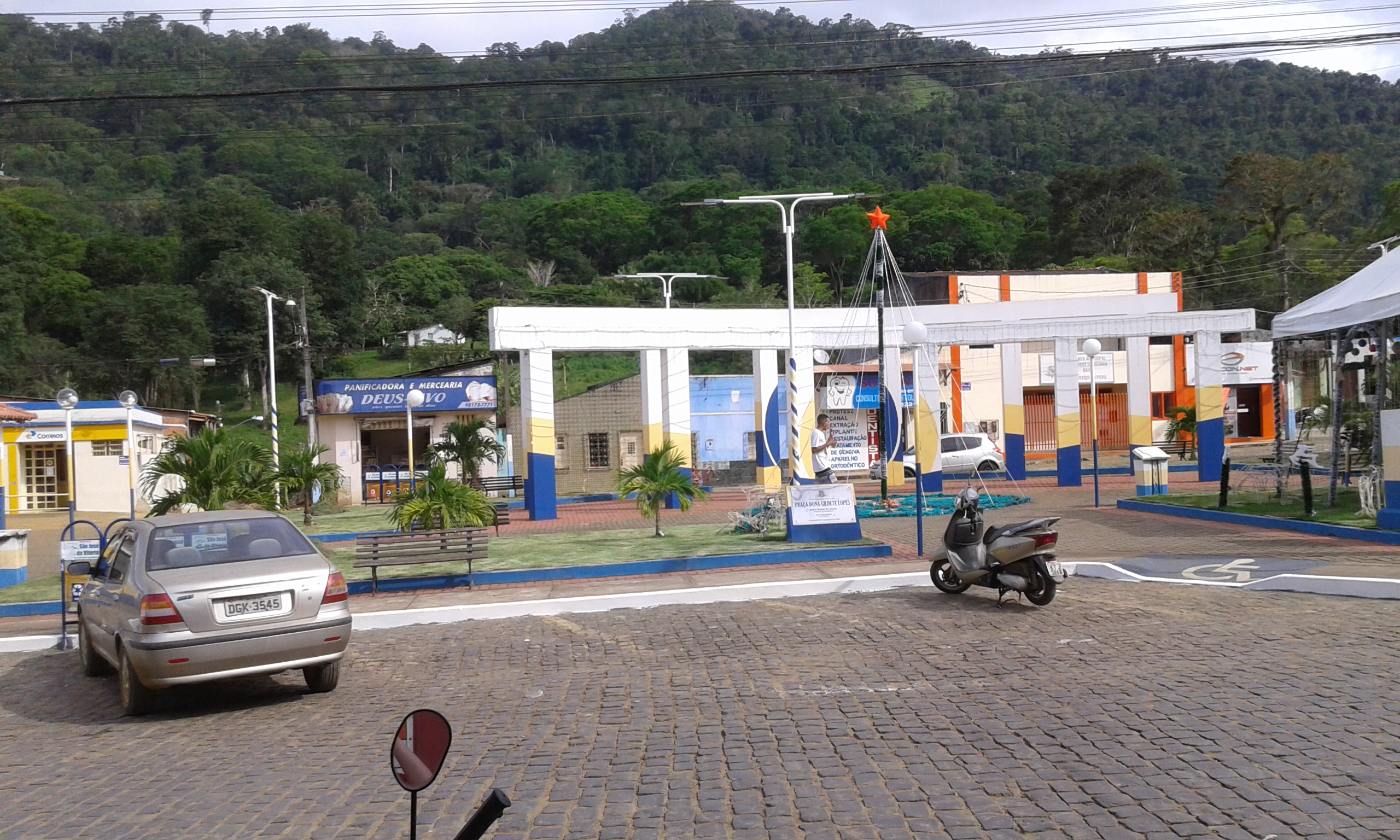
- Square of São José da Vitória (december 2022)

- Location in Brazil
- Country: Brazil
- Region: Nordeste
- State: Bahia

Government
  - Mayor: Jeová Nunes de Souza

Area
  - Total: 49,392 sq mi (127,925 km^{2})

Population (2021)
  - Total: 5,562
- Time zone: UTC−3 (BRT)

São José da Vitória is a municipality in the state of Bahia in the North-East region of Brazil.

Several of the communities in the municipality depend on water originating in the 11,336 hectares (28,010 acres) Serra das Lontras National Park, created in 2010.

== See also ==
- List of municipalities in Bahia
