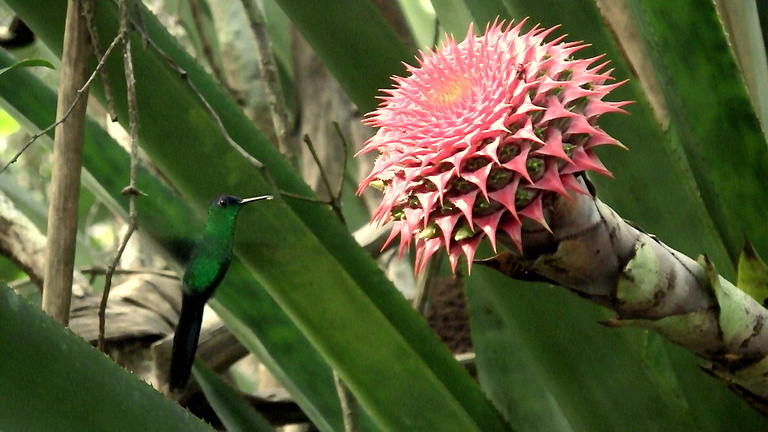
- Karawata multiflora

Scientific classification
- Kingdom: Plantae
- Clade: Tracheophytes
- Clade: Angiosperms
- Clade: Monocots
- Clade: Commelinids
- Order: Poales
- Family: Bromeliaceae
- Subfamily: Bromelioideae
- Genus: Karawata; J.R.Maciel & G.M.Sousa

Species
- See text.

Synonyms

= Karawata =

Genus of plants

Karawata is a genus of flowering plant in the family Bromeliaceae, native to eastern Brazil. The genus was first described in 2019.

== Species ==
As of April 2022, Plants of the World Online accepted the following species:

- Karawata depressa (L.B.Sm.) J.R.Maciel & G.M.Sousa, syn. Aechmea depressa L.B.Sm
- Karawata gustavoi (J.A.Siqueira & Leme) J.R.Maciel & G.M.Sousa, syn. Aechmea gustavoi J.A.Siqueira & Leme
- Karawata hostilis (E.Pereira) J.R.Maciel & G.M.Sousa, syn. Aechmea hostilis E.Pereira
- Karawata multiflora (L.B.Sm.) J.R.Maciel & G.M.Sousa, syn. Aechmea multiflora L.B.Sm.
- Karawata nigribracteata (J.R.Maciel, Louzada & M.Alves) J.R.Maciel & G.M.Sousa, syn. Aechmea nigribracteata J.R.Maciel, Louzada & M.Alves
- Karawata prasinata (G.M.Sousa & Wand.) J.R.Maciel & G.M.Sousa, syn. Aechmea prasinata G.M.Sousa & Wand.
- Karawata saxicola (L.B.Sm.) J.R.Maciel & G.M.Sousa, syn. Aechmea saxicola L.B.Sm.
