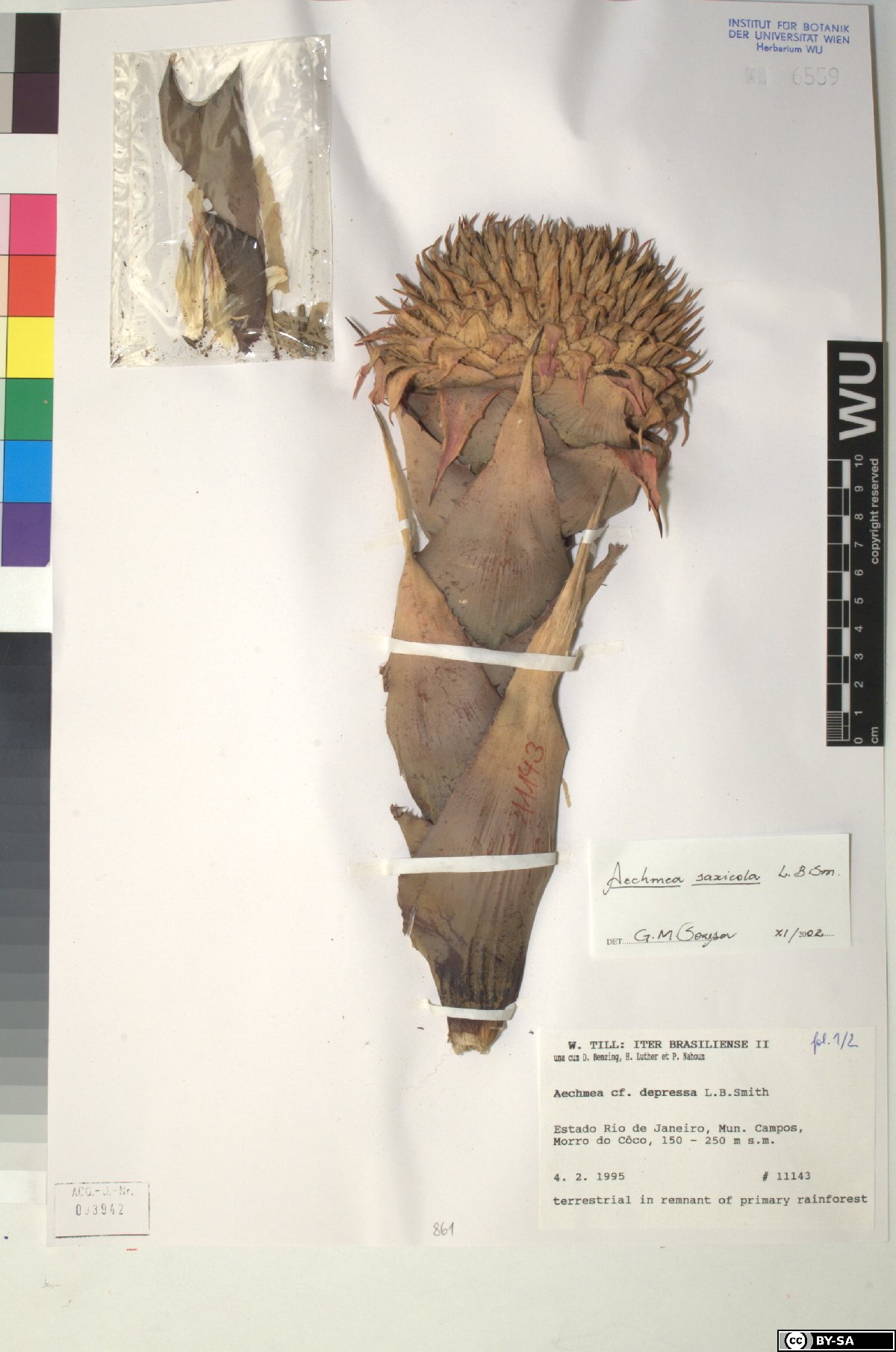

Scientific classification
- Kingdom: Plantae
- Clade: Tracheophytes
- Clade: Angiosperms
- Clade: Monocots
- Clade: Commelinids
- Order: Poales
- Family: Bromeliaceae
- Subfamily: Bromelioideae
- Genus: Karawata
- Species: K. depressa

Binomial name
- Karawata depressa (L.B.Sm.) J.R.Maciel & G.M.Sousa

Synonyms
- Aechmea depressa L.B.Sm.; Chevaliera depressa (L.B.Sm.) L.B.Sm. & W.J.Kress

= Karawata depressa =

Species of flowering plant

Karawata depressa is a species of flowering plant in the family Bromeliaceae, endemic to Brazil (the state of Bahia). It was first described by Lyman Bradford Smith in 1941 as Aechmea depressa.
