= Belmonte, Bahia =

Municipality of Bahia State, Brazil

Belmonte
- Municipality of Bahia, Brazil
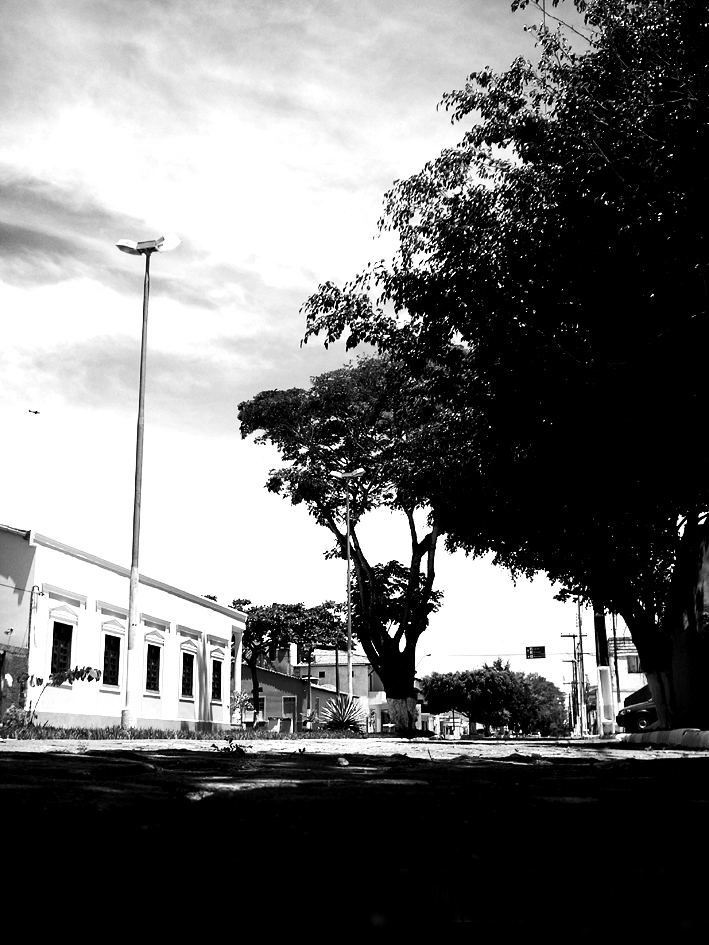

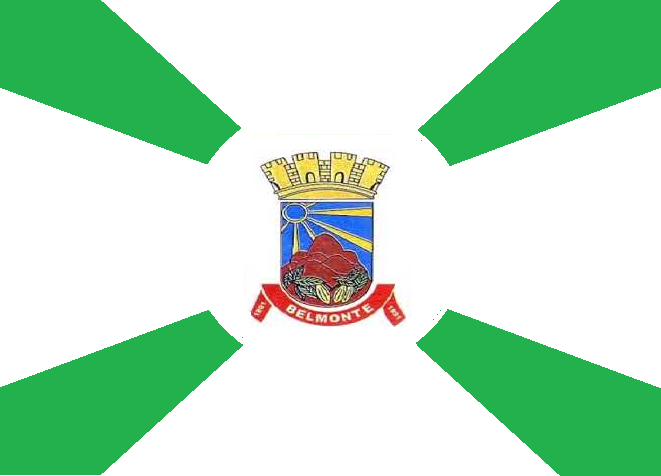
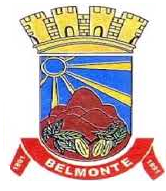
- Flag Coat of arms
- Etymology: Named after the city in Portugal, where Pedro Álvares Cabral, the European discoverer of Brazil, originated from
- Location of Belmonte in Bahia

- Location within Brazil Location within South America
- Coordinates: 15°51′47″S 38°52′58″W
- Country: Brazil
- Region: Northeast
- State: Bahia
- Founded: 23 May 1891

Government
  - Mayor: Iedo Jose Menezes Elias (PSD) (2025-2028)
  - Vice Mayor: Alice Maria Magnavita Elias de Britto (PP) (2025-2028)

Area
  - Total: 1,939.447 km^{2} (748.825 sq mi)
- Elevation: 8 m (26 ft)

Population (2022)
  - Total: 20,121
  - Density: 10.37/km^{2} (26.9/sq mi)
- Demonym: Belmontense (Brazilian Portuguese)
- Time zone: UTC-03:00 (Brasília Time)
- Postal code: 45800-000, 45803-000, 45805-000, 45804-000, 45806-000
- HDI (2010): 0.598 – medium
- Website: belmonte.ba.gov.br

Belmonte is a municipality (município) in the Brazilian state of Bahia. It is located at 15º51'47" S, 38º52'58" W. It is 8 metres above sea level. In 2020 it had an estimated population of 23,437 inhabitants.

The municipality covers a total area of 2016.85 km^{2} and was founded in 1764.

The municipality contains part of the 100,646-hectare (248,700-acre) Canavieiras Extractive Reserve, created in 2006.

== See also ==
- List of municipalities in Bahia
