= Karawata hostilis =

Scientific classification
- Kingdom: Plantae
- Clade: Tracheophytes
- Clade: Angiosperms
- Clade: Monocots
- Clade: Commelinids
- Order: Poales
- Family: Bromeliaceae
- Subfamily: Bromelioideae
- Genus: Karawata
- Species: K. hostilis

Binomial name
- Karawata hostilis (E.Pereira) J.R.Maciel & G.M.Sousa

Synonyms
- Aechmea hostilis E.Pereira; Chevaliera hostilis (E.Pereira) L.B.Sm. & W.J.Kress

Species of plant

Karawata hostilis is a species of flowering plant in the family Bromeliaceae, endemic to Brazil (the state of Espírito Santo). It was first described in 1972 as Aechmea hostilis.
