= Wildlife refuge (Brazil) =

Protected areas in Brazil

Ilha dos Lobos

A Wildlife refuge (Portuguese: Refúgio da Vida Silvestre) in Brazil is a type of strictly protected area of Brazil defined by law. The purpose of the wildlife refuge is to ensure survival or reproduction of a species or community of flora or fauna, with access rules defined by the administrative agency.

== Definition ==
In Brazil a wildlife refuge is one of the Integral Protection Units defined by Article 13 of Law No. 9,985 of 18 July 2000, National System of Conservation Units (SNUG). The refuges have the objective of protecting natural environments to ensure conditions for survival or reproduction of species or communities of local flora and local or migratory fauna. They can also be defined for natural monuments. A wildlife refuge may include privately owned land if the goals are not incompatible with the use of the land and natural resources by the owners, but the land may be expropriated if there is a conflict. Access for scientific research requires prior authorization from the administrative agency. Rules for public access are also defined by the agency.

== Selected list ==
Name	Level	State	Created	Area (ha)	Biome
Banhado dos Pachecos	State	Rio Grande do Sul	2002	2,560	
Boa Nova	Federal	Bahia	2010	15,024	
Campos de Palmas	Federal	Paraná	2006	16,582	
Castanheiras Pied Tamarin	Municipal	Amazonas	1982	109	Amazon
Corixão da Mata Azul	State	Mato Grosso	2001	40,000	Cerrado
Ilha dos Lobos	Federal	Rio Grande do Sul	1983	142	Coastal marine
Ilhas do Abrigo e Guararitama	State	São Paulo	2013	481	Coastal marine
Libélulas da Serra de São José	State	Minas Gerais	2004	3,717	
Metrópole da Amazônia	State	Pará	2010	6,367	Amazon
Padre Sérgio Tonetto	State	Pará	2016	339	
Quelônios do Araguaia	State	Mato Grosso	2001	60,000	
Rio dos Frades	Federal	Bahia	2007	894	
Santa Cruz	Federal	Espírito Santo	2010	17,741	Coastal marine
Tabuleiro do Embaubal	State	Pará	2016	4,034	
Una	Federal	Bahia	2007	23,404	
Veredas do Oeste Baiano	Federal	Bahia	2002	128,521	

== Sources ==
- Categorias de unidades de conservação (in Portuguese), Chico Mendes Institute for Biodiversity Conservation, archived from the original on 2016-05-23
- Decreto Nº 4.340, de 22 de Agosto de 2002, Presidência da República - Casa Civil - Subchefia para Assuntos Jurídicos, August 22, 2002
- LEI No 9.985, DE 18 DE JULHO DE 2000, Presidência da República - Casa Civil- Subchefia para Assuntos Jurídicos, 18 July 2000
