= Canavieiras Extractive Reserve =

Extractive reserve in Bahia, Brazil

- Reserva Extrativista de Canavieiras
- IUCN category VI (protected area with sustainable use of natural resources)
- Location within Brazil
- Nearest city: Canavieiras, Bahia
- Coordinates: 15.657668°S 38.898365°W
- Area: 100,646 hectares (248,700 acres)
- Designation: Extractive reserve
- Created: 5 June 2006
- Administrator: Chico Mendes Institute for Biodiversity Conservation

The Canavieiras Extractive Reserve (Portuguese: Reserva Extrativista de Canavieiras) is a coastal marine extractive reserve in the state of Bahia, Brazil.

== Location ==
The Canavieiras Extractive Reserve is divided between the municipalities of Belmonte (2.65%), Canavieiras (11.51%) and Una (0.38%) in Bahia and a strip of coastal waters. It has an area of 100,646 hectares (248,700 acres). The reserve includes 85,000 hectares (210,000 acres) of sea, 12,000 hectares (30,000 acres) of mangroves and 3,000 hectares (7,400 acres) of land. The land is flat, rising to no more than 10 metres (33 ft) above sea level. Average annual rainfall is 2,000 millimetres (79 in). Temperatures vary from 20 to 30 °C (68 to 86 °F) with an average of 24 °C (75 °F).

== History ==
The Canavieiras Extractive Reserve was created by presidential decree on 5 June 2006. It is administered by the Chico Mendes Institute for Biodiversity Conservation. It became part of the Central Atlantic Forest Ecological Corridor, created in 2002. It is classed as IUCN protected area category VI (protected area with sustainable use of natural resources). An extractive reserve is an area used by traditional extractive populations whose livelihood is based on extraction, subsistence agriculture and small-scale animal raising. Its basic objectives are to protect the livelihoods and culture of these people and to ensure sustainable use of natural resources.

The deliberative council was created on 3 September 2009. On 16 December 2009 the Instituto Nacional de Colonização e Reforma Agrária (INCRA: National Institute for Colonization and Agrarian Reform) recognised the reserve as supporting 1,300 families, who would qualify for PRONAF support. On 5 December 2015 ICMBio granted the Associação Mãe dos Extrativistas da Reserva Extrativista de Canavieira (AMEX) the right of use for 20 years. A profile of the beneficiary families was published on 5 August 2016.

== Sources ==
- Lamas, Ivana Reis; Crepaldi, Maria Otávia; Mesquita, Carlos Alberto Bernardo (2015), Uma Rede no Corredor (PDF) (in Portuguese), Conservação Internacional (CI-Brasil), ISBN 978-85-98830-28-5
- Resex de Canavieiras (in Portuguese), ICMBio: Chico Mendes Institute for Biodiversity Conservation, archived from the original on 2017-12-07
- RESEX de Canavieiras (in Portuguese), ISA: Instituto Socioambiental
- Unidade de Conservação: Reserva Extrativista de Canavieiras (in Portuguese), MMA: Ministério do Meio Ambiente
