= Una, Bahia =

Coordinates: 15°17′S 39°4′W

Una
- Municipality
- The Municipality of Una
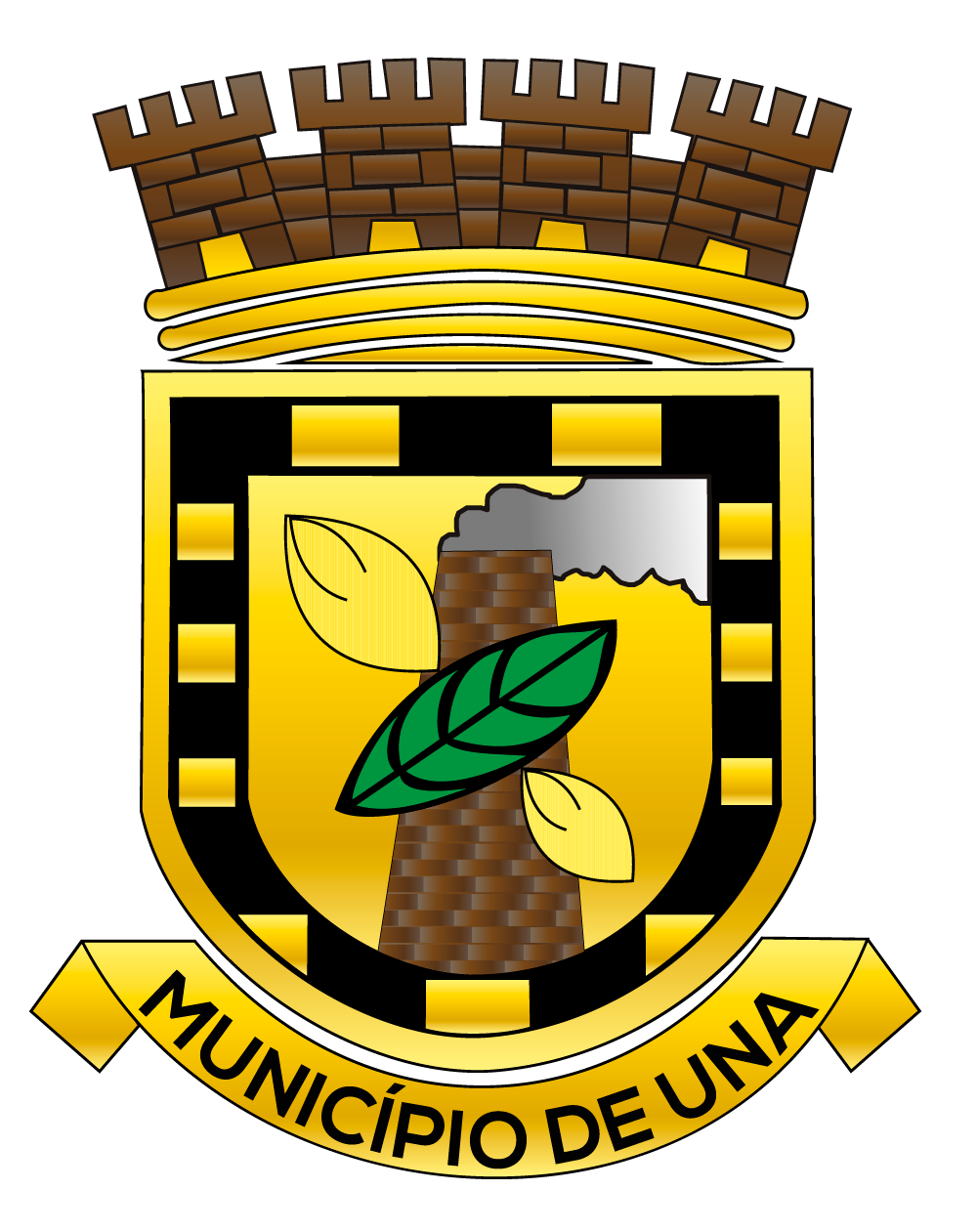
- Flag Coat of arms

- Location of the city
- Country: Brazil
- Region: Northeast
- State: Bahia
- Mesoregion: Sul Baiano
- Microregion: Ilhéus-Itabuna

Government
  - Mayor: Dejair Birschner (2009-2012)

Area
  - Total: 1,126.733 km^{2} (435.034 sq mi)
- Elevation: 40 m (130 ft)

Population (2020)
  - Total: 18,544
  - Density: 20.5/km^{2} (53/sq mi)
- Time zone: UTC−3 (BRT)

Una is a city in Bahia, Brazil. Its population in 2020 was 18,544 inhabitants. It is located about 36 mi (58 km) south from Ilheus.

The municipality was founded on August 2, 1890. The GDP per capita is R$ 2,649 (IBGE / 2005). Una-Comandatuba Airport serves both the city of Una and Transamérica Resort, located at nearby Comandatuba Island.

== Geography ==
The climate is hot and humid, with annual rainfall over 1,800 millimetres (71 in). The temperature varies from 19 to 28 °C (66 to 82 °F), with an average of 24 °C (75 °F). The municipality contains the 18,715 hectares (46,250 acres) Una Biological Reserve, a strictly protected conservation unit created in 1980. It contains most of the 23,262 hectares (57,480 acres) Una Wildlife Refuge, which surrounds the biological reserve. It also contains part of the 11,336 hectares (28,010 acres) Serra das Lontras National Park, created in 2010. The municipality contains part of the 100,646 hectares (248,700 acres) Canavieiras Extractive Reserve, created in 2006.
