= Santa Cruz Wildlife Refuge =

- Refúgio de Vida Silvestre de Santa Cruz
- IUCN category III (natural monument or feature)
- Location within Brazil
- Nearest city: Aracruz, Espírito Santo
- Coordinates: 20°01′00″S 40°05′04″W
- Area: 17,741 hectares (43,840 acres)
- Designation: Wildlife refuge
- Administrator: Chico Mendes Institute for Biodiversity Conservation

The Santa Cruz Wildlife Refuge (Portuguese: Refúgio de Vida Silvestre de Santa Cruz) is a wildlife refuge in the state of Espírito Santo, Brazil.

== Location ==
The Santa Cruz Wildlife Refuge is offshore from the municipality of Aracruz, Espírito Santo. It has an area of 17,741 hectares (43,840 acres). It is contained within the Costa das Algas Environmental Protection Area. The refuge covers a roughly rectangular area of the Atlantic Ocean extending southeast from the coast between Rio Preto in the south and Pontal do Piraqueaçu in the north. A survey to provide information on creation of the conservation unit found 116 species of vascular plants in the salt marches and mangroves and 560 species of algae. The algae provide substrate, shelter and food for the diverse marine fauna.

== History ==
The Santa Cruz Wildlife Refuge was created by federal decree on 17 June 2010. The management plan was to define fully protected areas and areas that could be used for small-scale fishing for subsistence purposes. It is administered by the Chico Mendes Institute for Biodiversity Conservation. It became part of the Central Atlantic Forest Ecological Corridor, created in 2002. The consultative council was created on 23 November 2010.

The refuge is classed as IUCN protected area category III (natural monument or feature). Objectives are to protect biological diversity and natural environments, including the mangroves and coastal vegetation important for species that use the area for feeding and breeding, and for stabilizing the coastline, to support compatible tourist, recreational and educational use of the seafront, and to contribute to recovery of biological resources and sustainability of fisheries and small-scale subsistence extraction by the coastal communities in the region around the unit.

== Sources ==
- Lamas, Ivana Reis; Crepaldi, Maria Otávia; Mesquita, Carlos Alberto Bernardo (2015), Uma Rede no Corredor (PDF) (in Portuguese), Conservação Internacional (CI-Brasil), ISBN 978-85-98830-28-5
- Revis de Santa Cruz (in Portuguese), ICMBio: Chico Mendes Institute for Biodiversity Conservation
- RVS Santa Cruz (in Portuguese), ISA: Instituto Socioambiental
- Unidade de Conservação: Refúgio de Vida Silvestre de Santa Cruz (in Portuguese), MMA: Ministério do Meio Ambiente
