= Metrópole da Amazônia Wildlife Refuge =

Protected area in Brazil

Metropolis of the Amazon
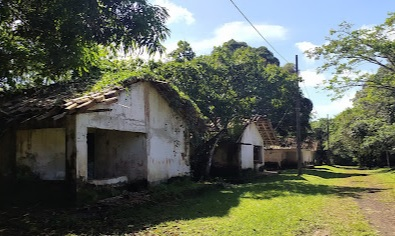
- Location: Ananindeua, Benevides, Marituba and Santa Isabel do Pará (Brazilian municipalities in the state of Pará)
- Area: 6,367.27 ha (24.5842 sq mi)
- Established: 2010
- Governing body: Institute for Forestry and Biodiversity Development of the State of Pará

Metrópole da Amazônia (in English: Metropolis of the Amazon) is a conservation unit of the wildlife refuge type of integral protection (in Brazil abbreviated REVIS) created in 2010 (by State Decree 2 211), in the Metropolitan Region of Belém (State of Pará, Brazil), 23 km (14 mi) from the capital of Belém. It is in the former Pirelli factory in The Guamá Farm, next to the Quilombola Territory of Abacatal, in an area of 6,367.27 ha (15,733.9 acres), covering four Brazilian municipalities in the state of Pará: Ananindeua, Benevides, Marituba and Santa Isabel do Pará.

The refuge is part of the AgroVárzea Project, having as main objectives: to contribute to the maintenance of natural ecological processes, through the protection of environments to ensure conditions for housing and reproduction of species of flora and fauna (part of the 31% of primary forest of the Metropolitan Region); develop productive techniques in the Forest Nursery of the communities. It features 15 km (9.3 mi) of hiking and cycling trails.
