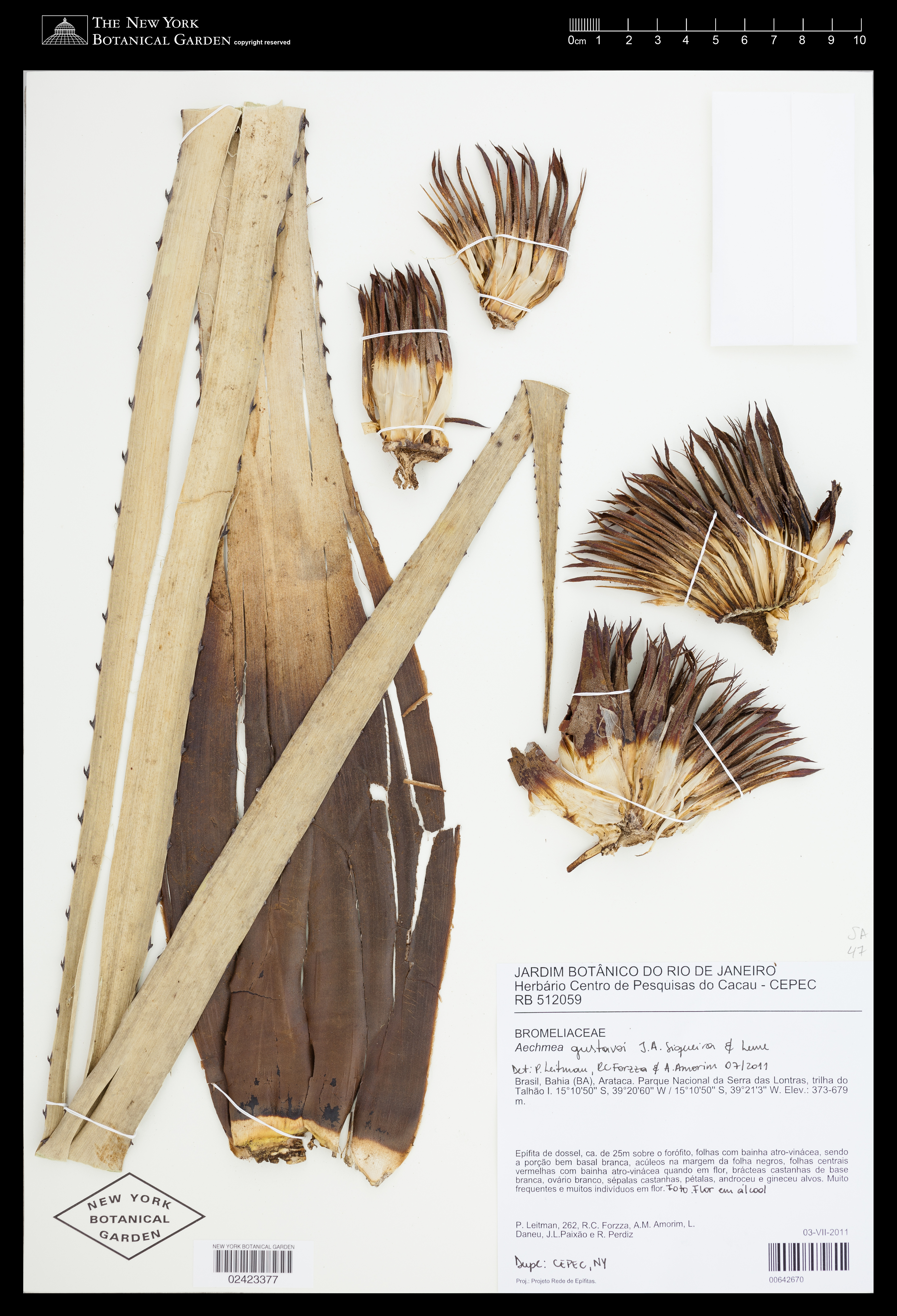

Scientific classification
- Kingdom: Plantae
- Clade: Tracheophytes
- Clade: Angiosperms
- Clade: Monocots
- Clade: Commelinids
- Order: Poales
- Family: Bromeliaceae
- Subfamily: Bromelioideae
- Genus: Karawata
- Species: K. gustavoi

Binomial name
- Karawata gustavoi (J.A.Siqueira & Leme) J.R.Maciel & G.M.Sousa

Synonyms
- Aechmea gustavoi J.A.Siqueira & Leme

= Karawata gustavoi =

Species of flowering plant

Karawata gustavoi is a species of flowering plant in the family Bromeliaceae, endemic to northeastern Brazil. It was first described in 2001 as Aechmea gustavoi.
