= Canavieiras =

Municipality of Bahia, Brazil

Coordinates: 15°40′30″S 38°56′49″W

- Municipality
- Flag Coat of arms

- Country: Brazil
- Region: Nordeste
- State: Bahia
- Mesoregion: Sul Baiano
- Microregion: Ilhéus-Itabuna

Area
  - Total: 531.105 sq mi (1,375.556 km^{2})

Population (2020)
  - Total: 30,906
  - Density: 63/sq mi (24.4/km^{2})
- Time zone: UTC−3 (BRT)
- Website: canavieiras.ba.gov.br

Canavieiras is a municipality in the state of Bahia in the North-East region of Brazil.

The municipality contains part of the 100,646 hectares (248,700 acres) Canavieiras Extractive Reserve, created in 2006.

The town is associated with a nearby gold mine, which has been operating since the 17th century. The mine is currently part of Yamana Gold's Jacobina operation. Traces of Uranium have been identified in the Gold and pyrite ore-bodies.

== Climate ==
Climate data for Canavieiras (1981–2010)
Month	Jan	Feb	Mar	Apr	May	Jun	Jul	Aug	Sep	Oct	Nov	Dec	Year
Mean daily maximum °C (°F)	30.1 (86.2)	30.5 (86.9)	30.3 (86.5)	29.7 (85.5)	28.5 (83.3)	27.3 (81.1)	26.8 (80.2)	26.6 (79.9)	27.3 (81.1)	28.2 (82.8)	28.7 (83.7)	29.5 (85.1)	28.6 (83.5)
Daily mean °C (°F)	26.6 (79.9)	26.7 (80.1)	26.5 (79.7)	25.6 (78.1)	24.3 (75.7)	22.8 (73.0)	22.3 (72.1)	22.5 (72.5)	23.7 (74.7)	24.8 (76.6)	25.5 (77.9)	26.2 (79.2)	24.8 (76.6)
Mean daily minimum °C (°F)	22.6 (72.7)	22.7 (72.9)	22.8 (73.0)	22.1 (71.8)	20.4 (68.7)	19.1 (66.4)	18.4 (65.1)	18.3 (64.9)	19.4 (66.9)	20.9 (69.6)	22.0 (71.6)	22.5 (72.5)	20.9 (69.6)
Average precipitation mm (inches)	95.2 (3.75)	118.4 (4.66)	180.2 (7.09)	195.5 (7.70)	145.1 (5.71)	135.5 (5.33)	140.0 (5.51)	91.2 (3.59)	77.4 (3.05)	124.8 (4.91)	143.2 (5.64)	145.3 (5.72)	1,591.8 (62.67)
Average precipitation days (≥ 1.0 mm)	12	13	15	16	12	14	15	14	11	10	12	11	155
Average relative humidity (%)	81.0	81.0	83.2	84.7	85.3	87.1	86.3	83.6	82.1	82.2	83.9	83.2	83.6
Mean monthly sunshine hours	260.5	227.0	221.4	188.1	182.4	156.4	169.6	189.7	193.6	208.4	196.6	217.8	2,411.5
Source: Instituto Nacional de Meteorologia

== See also ==
- List of municipalities in Bahia
