= Una Biological Reserve =

Atlantic forest in Brazil

- Reserva Biológica de Una
- IUCN category Ia (strict nature reserve)
- Location within Brazil
- Nearest city: Itabuna, Bahia
- Coordinates: 15.173°S 39.132°W
- Area: 18,715 hectares (46,250 acres)
- Designation: Biological reserve
- Created: 10 December 1980

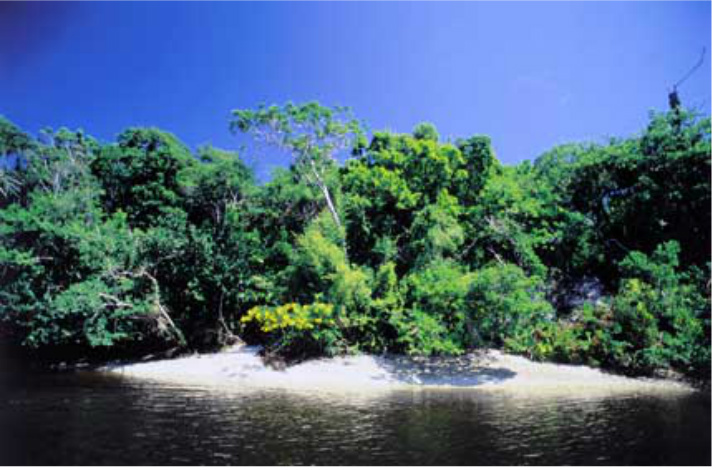

Una Biological Reserve (Portuguese: Reserva Biológica de Una) is a Biological reserve in Brazil.

== Location ==
The Una Biological Reserve, which is in the Atlantic Forest biome and covers 18,715 hectares (46,250 acres), was created on 10 December 1980. It became part of the Central Atlantic Forest Ecological Corridor, created in 2002. It is in the Una municipality of Bahia. The climate is hot and humid, with annual rainfall over 1,800 millimetres (71 in). The temperature varies from 19 to 28 °C (66 to 82 °F), with an average of 24 °C (75 °F).

Elevation ranges from 0 to 400 metres (0 to 1,312 ft) above sea level. The terrain has isolated plateaus, mostly around 200 to 300 metres (660 to 980 ft) in height, within a flat coastal plain. Removal of the original forest cover has caused accelerated erosion of the plateaus. The reserve is in the basin of the Una River, which is fed by the Aliança and São Pedro rivers. The Serra River runs through the reserve from the west to the south east. The Maruim River forms the natural border of the north west of the reserve.

The flora is a diverse example of Atlantic Forest biome. Fauna include three species of seriously threatened endemic primates: the golden lion tamarin, black-tufted marmoset and golden-bellied capuchin. The environment has been damaged by deforestation, removal of riparian vegetation and cattle damage to the river banks causing more extreme flooding and greater levels of sediment in the water. This has had negative effects to the fauna.

== Conservation ==
The Biological Reserve is a "strict nature reserve" under IUCN protected area category Ia. The purpose is to fully preserve the biota and their natural attributes without direct human interference.

Protected birds in the reserve include the Atlantic black-breasted woodpecker (Celeus tinnunculus), black-headed berryeater (Carpornis melanocephala), red-billed curassow (Crax blumenbachii), banded cotinga (Cotinga maculata), Stresemann's bristlefront (Merulaxis stresemanni), band-tailed antwren (Myrmotherula urosticta), ochre-marked parakeet (Pyrrhura cruentata) and striated softtail (Thripophaga macroura).

Other protected species in the reserve include golden-headed lion tamarin (Leontopithecus chrysomelas), maned sloth (Bradypus torquatus), giant anteater (Myrmecophaga tridactyla), cougar (Puma concolor), Recife broad-nosed bat, Platyrrhinus recifinus, Hercules beetle (Dynastes hercules), the butterfly Napeogenes rhezia and the Characiformes fish Nematocharax venustus.

== Sources ==
- Lamas, Ivana Reis; Crepaldi, Maria Otávia; Mesquita, Carlos Alberto Bernardo (2015), Uma Rede no Corredor (PDF) (in Portuguese), Conservação Internacional (CI-Brasil), ISBN 978-85-98830-28-5, archived from the original (PDF) on 2019-03-29
- Rebio de Una (in Portuguese), Chico Mendes Institute for Biodiversity Conservation, archived from the original on 2014-02-02
- "Reserva Biológica de Una", ViaRural (in Portuguese)
- Unidade de Conservação: Reserva Biológica de Una (in Portuguese), MMA: Ministério do Meio Ambiente
