= Aracruz, Espírito Santo =

Aracruz Município de Aracruz
- Municipality
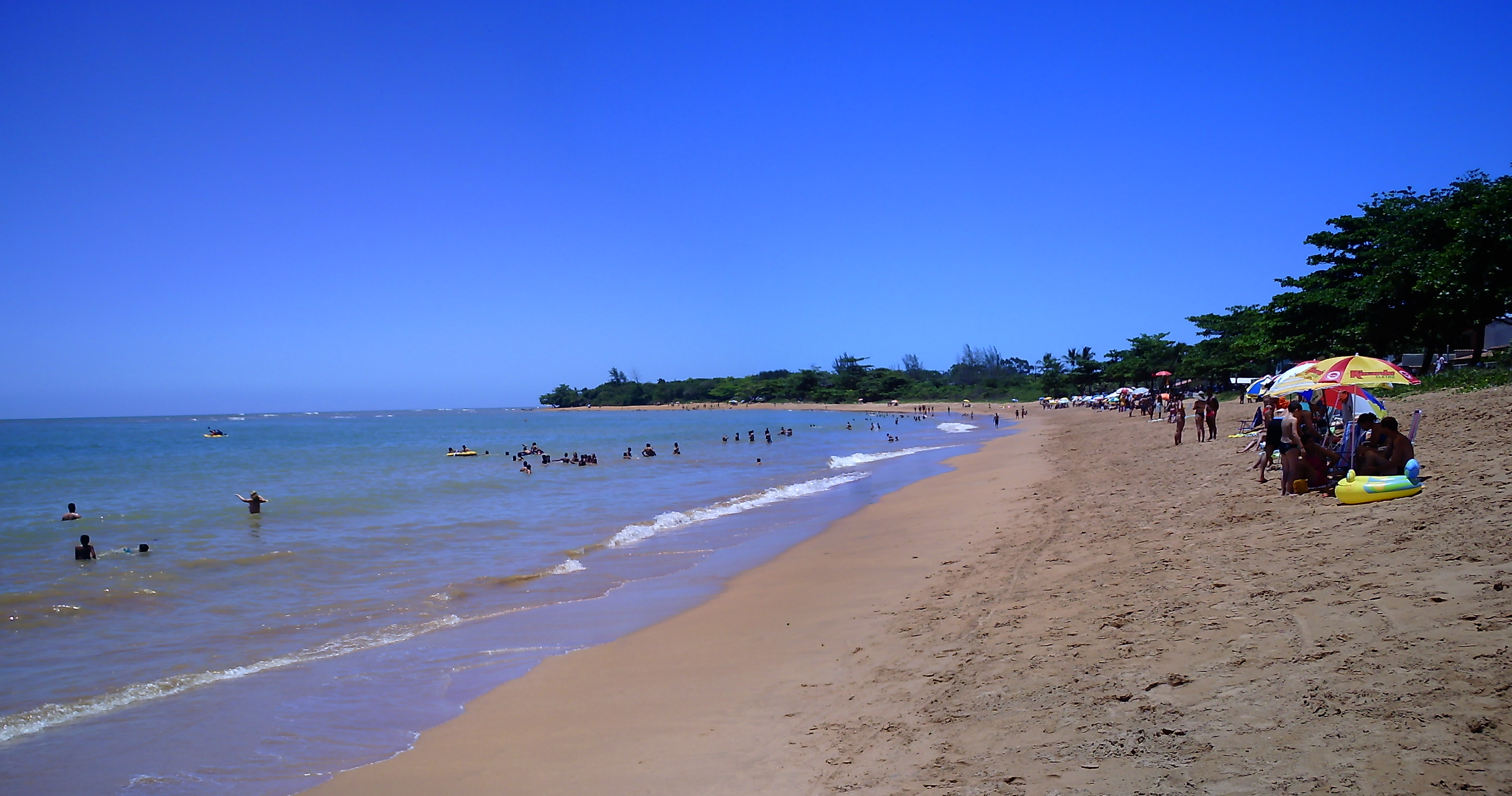
- Putiri Beach, Aracruz, Espírito Santo

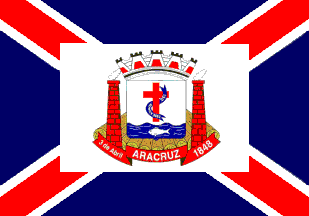
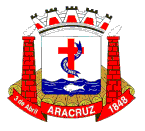
- Flag Coat of arms

- Location of Aracruz in Espírito Santo

- Location of Aracruz in Brazil
- Coordinates: 19°49′12″S 40°16′22″W
- Country: Brazil
- Region: Southeast
- Founded: April 3, 1848

Government
  - Mayor: Jones Cavaglieri (Solidariedade)

Area
  - Total: 1,423.87 km^{2} (549.76 sq mi)

Population (2022 Census)
  - Total: 94,765
  - Estimate (2025): 103,363
  - Density: 66.555/km^{2} (172.38/sq mi)
- Demonym: Aracruzense
- Time zone: UTC−3 (BRT)
- Website: pma.es.gov.br

Aracruz is a municipality at the central coast of Espírito Santo, Brazil.

== Geography ==
Aracruz covers 1,423.87 km^{2} (549.76 mi^{2}), and has a population of 103,101 with a population density of 66 inhabitants per square kilometer. The municipality contains part of the 785 hectares (1,940 acres) Comboios Biological Reserve, a fully protected area. The 17,741 hectares (43,840 acres) Santa Cruz Wildlife Refuge created in 2010 extends offshore from the municipality. The coastline of the municipality is also protected in part by the 112,545 hectares (278,100 acres) Costa das Algas Environmental Protection Area, created in 2010.

== History ==
The municipality's history begins in 1556, when two Jesuit priests (Braz Lourenço and Diogo Jácomo) founded Santa Cruz, a town then called Aldeia Nova (New Village). Aldeia Nova later became known as Aldeia Velha (Old Village), since it didn't prosper as much as its neighbour, which then became known as Aldeia Nova, and is today called Nova Almeida. Aldeia Velha became emancipated as a municipality in 1848, and changed its name to Santa Cruz. In 1943, the municipality and its capital were both renamed Aracruz. However, the biggest economic driver at the time was jacarandá wood, and Sauaçu held most of the wood processing plants (serrarias), so in 1948 the capital was moved to Sauaçu (also called Sauassu), and the capital's name went with it. Sauaçu then became known as Aracruz, and Aracruz reverted to its formal and present name, Santa Cruz.

Santa Cruz was founded at the mouth of the Piraquê-mirim and Piraquê-açu Rivers, as were a number of Amerindian tribes. After a visit from the Emperor Peter II who slept in Santa Cruz in 1860, he signed permission for 386 Italian families to settle in Santa Cruz, and those families founded Fazenda Nova Trento (New Trento Farm) around 1874. Other groups moved up the Piraquê-açu river to found Palmas Farm (Fazenda das Palmas) and Santa Teresa. At this time coffee and cassava plantations were common.

Another large wave of Italian immigrants began coming around 1872, when a ship called Sofia arrived bringing 386 Italians from the region of Trento. Those went on to found Nova Trento Colony.

On November 25, 2022, a shooting spree occurred at two schools in Aracruz: the Primo Bitti State Elementary and Middle School, a public school; and the Praia de Coqueiral Educational Center, a private school. Four people were killed, and 12 others were injured. The suspect, a 16-year-old former student at the public school, was arrested approximately four hours later.

== Demographics ==
According to the IBGE population estimate for 2016, Aracruz is the tenth most populated municipality in Espírito Santo, with 96,746 residents. The population, according to the 2022 IBGE Census was 94,765 and in 2025 the estimate was 103,363.

== Population ==
Aracruz is home to roughly 1,500 Native Americans divided into six reservations: Caieiras Velha, Comboios, Irajá, Pau Brasil, Tekoá and Três Palmeiras. Only in the last couple of decades have they been able to secure their land here, as many problems with the local paper industry greatly prolonged their land struggles. Those Amerindians belong to two tribes: the Tupiniquim and the Guarani. The Native Americans in Aracruz Municipality no longer speak their native languages, but they hold on to their traditional subsistence farming and handcraft trade.
