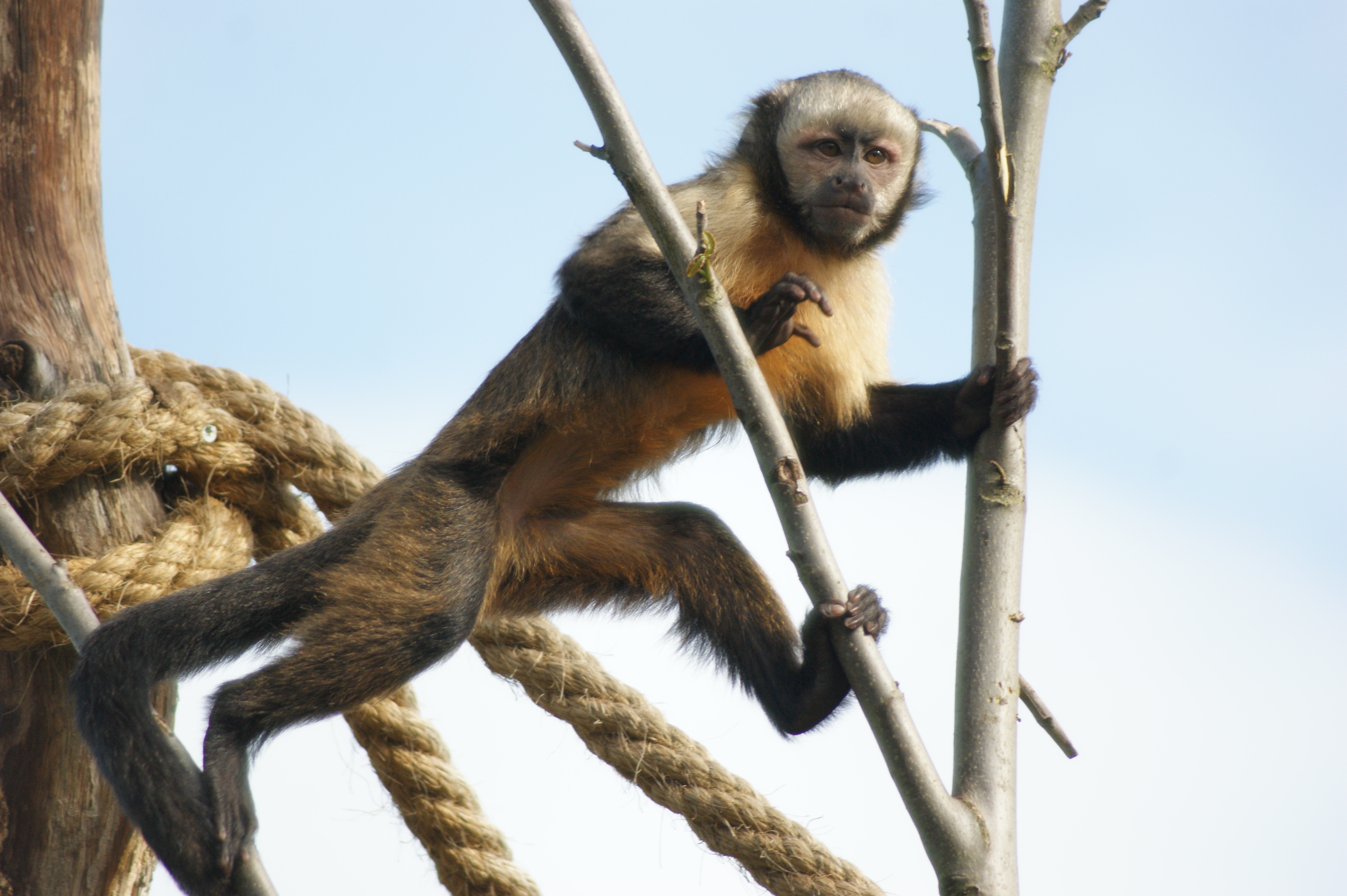
- At Zürich Zoologischer Garten, Switzerland

Conservation status
- Critically Endangered (IUCN 3.1)

Scientific classification
- Kingdom: Animalia
- Phylum: Chordata
- Class: Mammalia
- Order: Primates
- Family: Cebidae
- Genus: Sapajus
- Species: S. xanthosternos

Binomial name
- Sapajus xanthosternos Wied-Neuwied, 1826
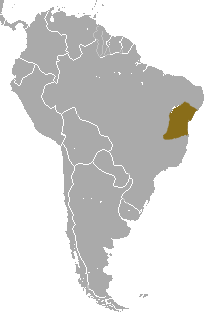
- Geographic range

Synonyms
- Cebus xanthosternos

= Golden-bellied capuchin =

Species of New World monkey

The golden-bellied capuchin (Sapajus xanthosternos), also known as the yellow-breasted or buff-headed capuchin, is a species of New World or neotropical monkey. It lives mainly in trees and are omnivorous, eating a wide variety of both plant and animals as food. Golden-bellied capuchin normal home range is in the Atlantic forest of Brazil and it is critically endangered due to forest fragmentation and habitat loss mainly due to agriculture, there are currently efforts to protect them by the local government.

== Characteristics ==
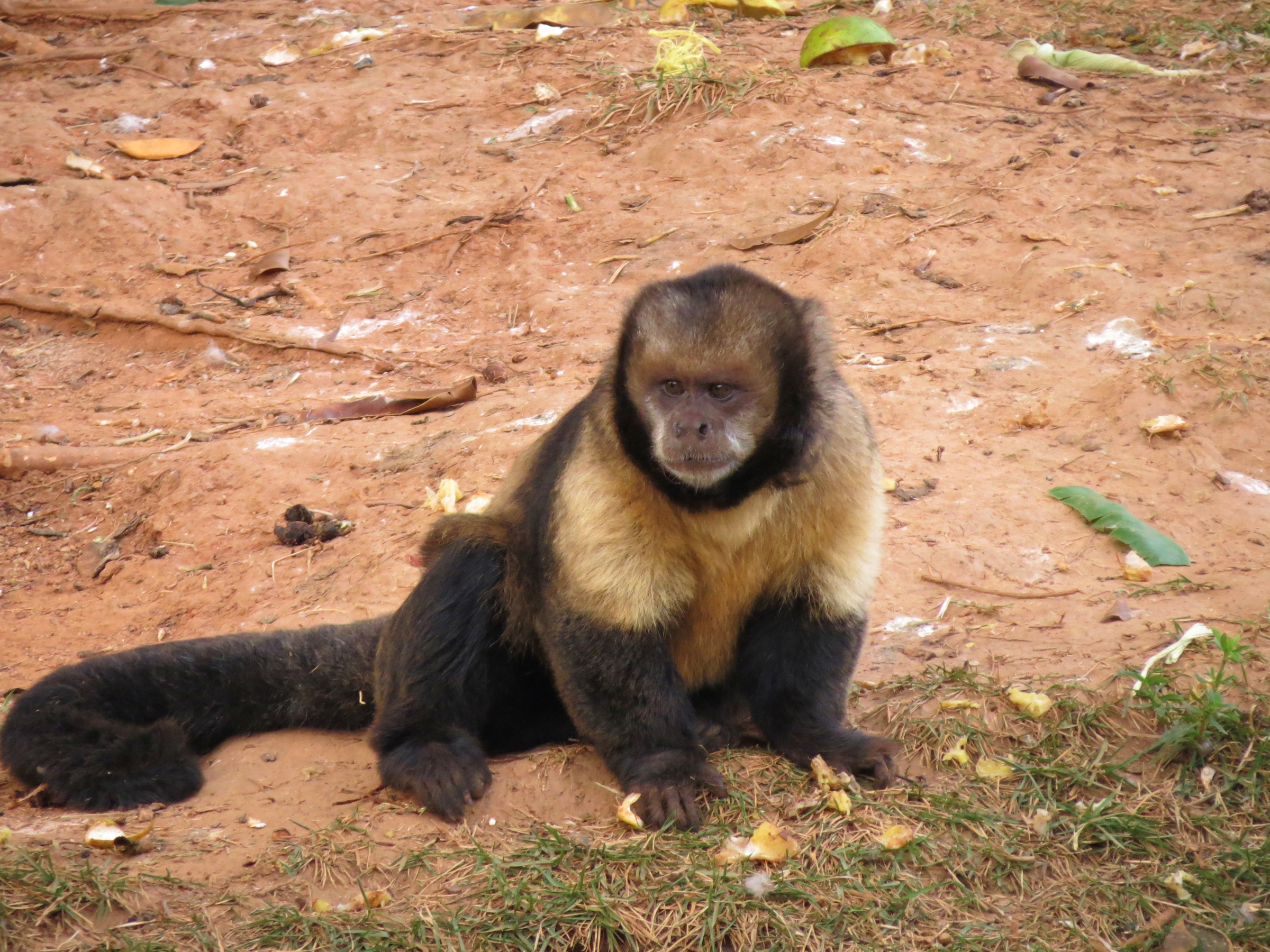
Golden-Bellied Capuchin In Sorocaba Zoo

Although there are differences between individuals as well as between the sexes and across age groups, S. xanthosternos is described as having a distinctive yellow to golden red chest, belly and upper arms. Its face is a light brown and its cap for which the capuchins were first named is a dark brown/black or light brown. Formerly thought to be a subspecies of tufted capuchin (S. apella), it was elevated to the status of species. Despite this previous classification, S. xanthosternos does not have very evident tufts, as they are oriented towards the rear of the skull and are hardly noticeable. A band of short hair around the upper part of the face with speckled colouring contrasts with the darker surrounding areas. The limbs and tail are also darkly coloured.

=== Size ===
Capuchins males stand around 40 cm (16 in) tall weighing an average of 4 kg (8.8 lb). Females are 37 cm (15 in) tall at round 2.5 kg (5.5 lb). Their prehensile tails are about the same length as their bodies and is helpful for swinging and climbing through the canopy. Capuchins have opposable big toes and long fingers assisting with climbing as well.

=== Life span ===
Capuchins life span is around 15–25 years when living in the wild. They can live much longer in captivity to about 50 years.

=== Origins ===
Capuchins falling under the genus of Sapajus and Cebus are believed to have a common ancestor originating in the Atlantic forest. Primates under the genus Sapajus then continued to live and occupy the Atlantic forest evolving into the species we know today such as Sapajus xanthosternos.

== Distribution and habitat ==
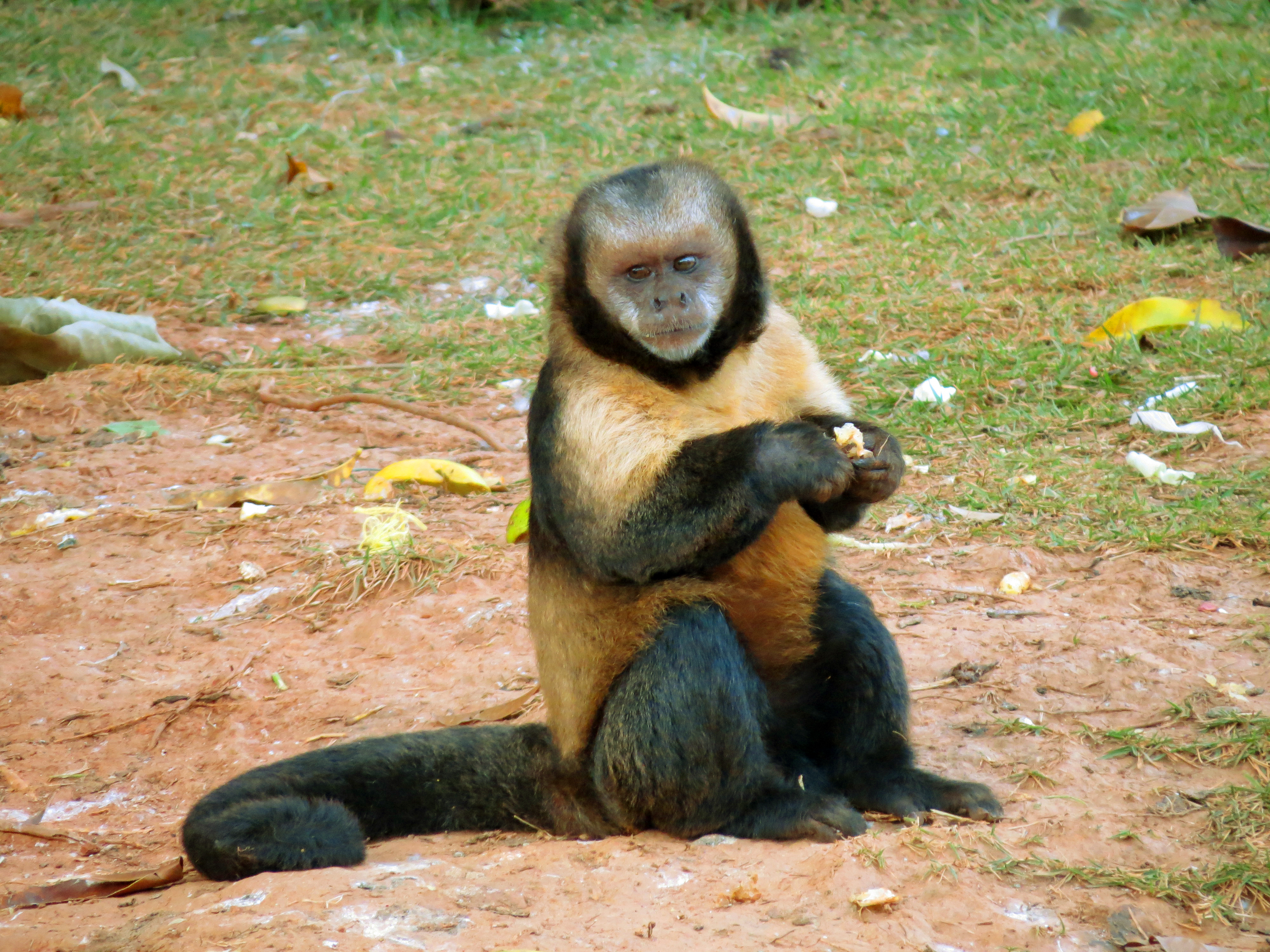
Golden-Bellied Capuchin in Sorocaba Zoo

Populations of S. xanthosternos are restricted to the Atlantic forest of south-eastern Bahia, Brazil, due possibly to high degrees of interference from humans. Historically they probably would have inhabited the entire area east of, and north to, the Rio São Francisco.

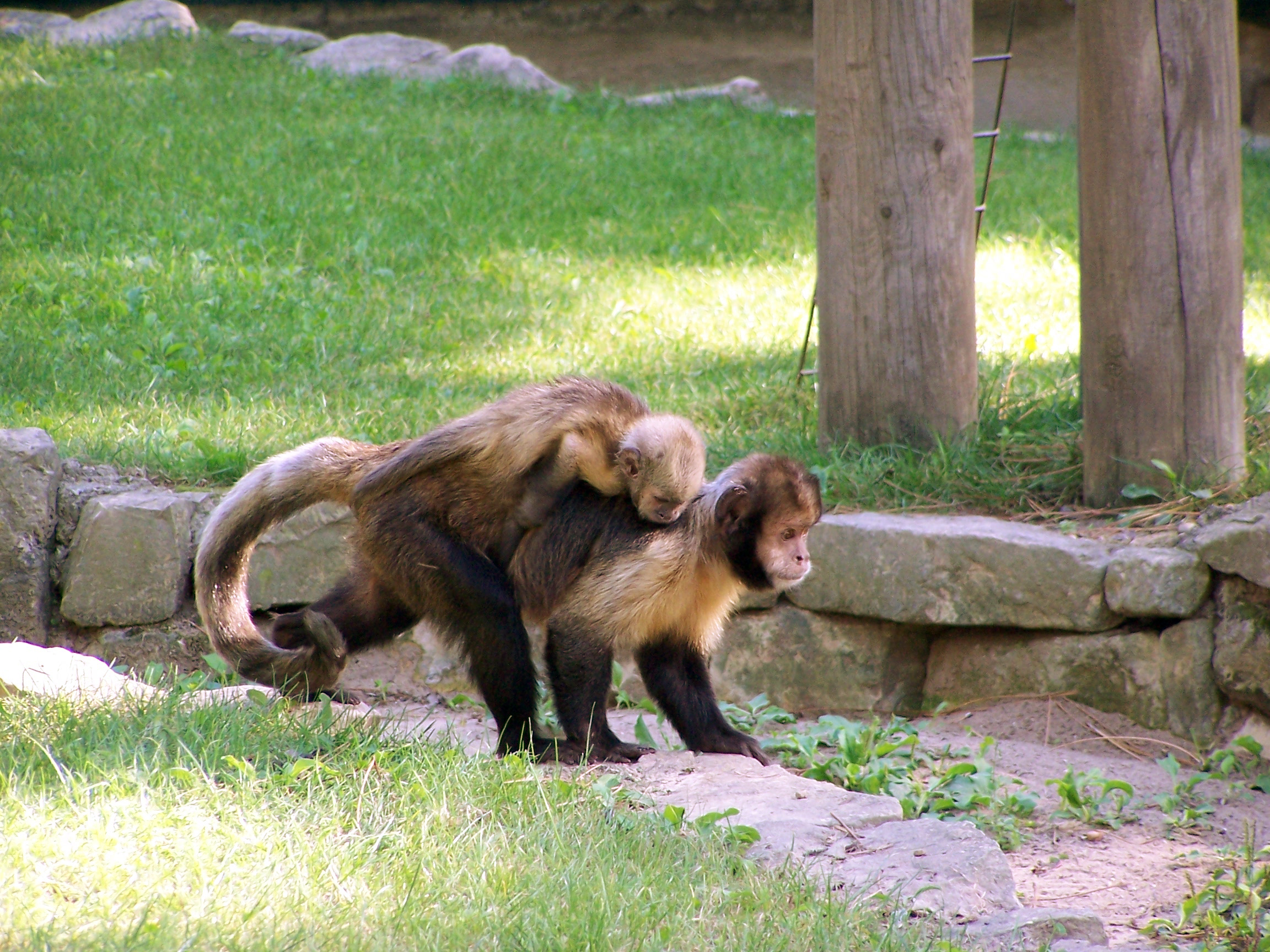
Female & Baby in Palmyre Zoo

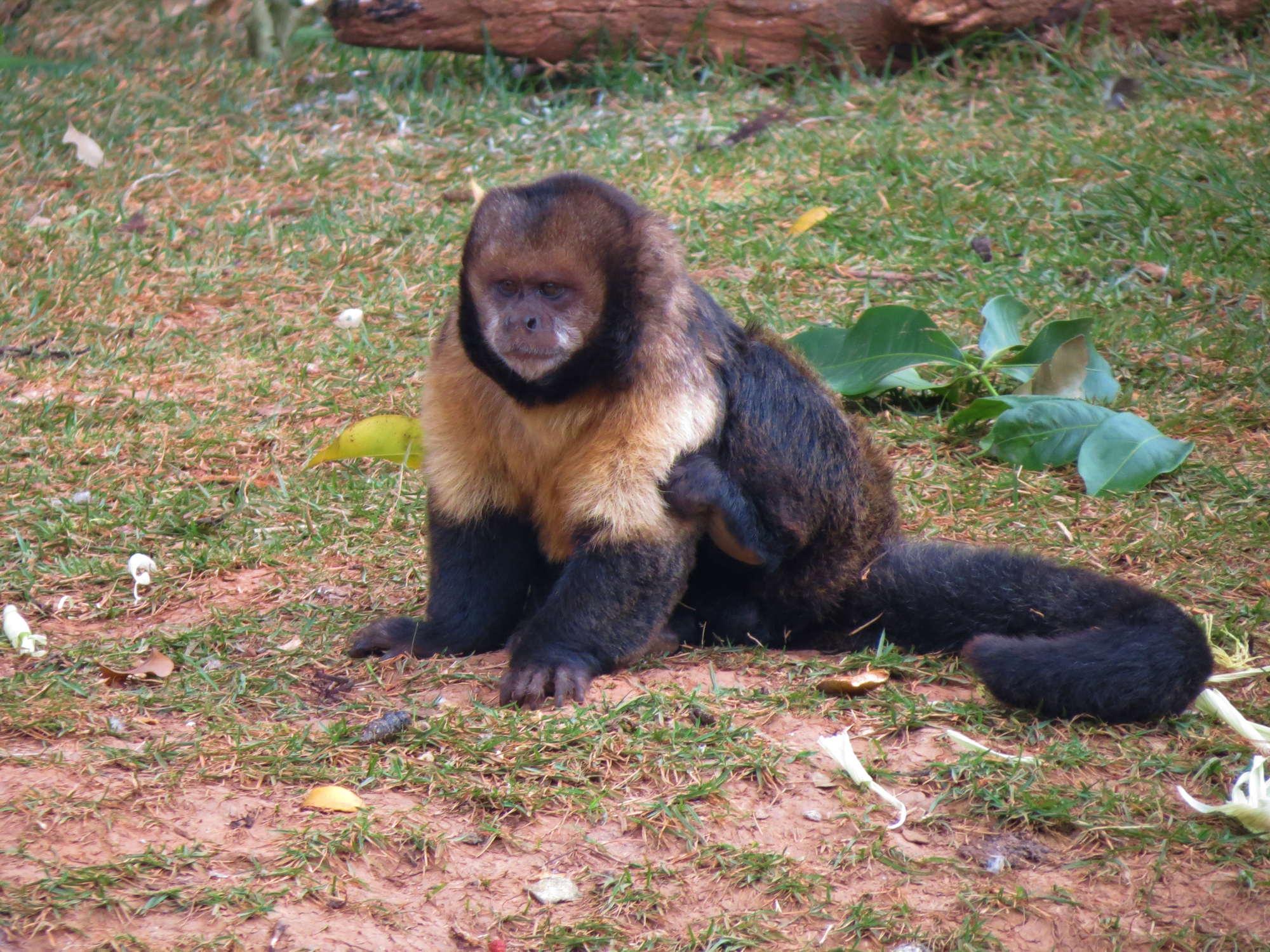
Golden-Bellied Capuchin In Sorocaba Zoo

The largest continuous area of forest in its known range, the Una Biological Reserve in Bahia, is estimated to contain a population of 185 individuals. As of 2004, there were 85 individuals in zoos and breeding facilities in Europe and Brazil.

=== Habitat fragmentation ===
The native biome of S. xanthosternos, the Atlantic forest of Brazil, is heavily fragmented with the majority of remaining forest fragment smaller than 50 hectares. Some of the remaining forests are maintained due to the presence of agroforests called cabrucas. The presence of these agroforests provide a habitat for local flora and fauna including S. xanthosternos. The remaining forest fragments tend to be surrounded by human activity such as farms, this is both beneficial and detrimental to the capuchins since they are able to raid crops to supplement their diet. This behavior, however, may lead to more confrontation and hunting by humans.

The ideal size of a forest fragment in order to properly sustain a population of S. xanthosternos is deemed to be larger than a range of approximately 400 to 700 hectares depending on local conditions, with currently approximately 2% of forest fragments being over 400 hectares this poses an issue for conservation.

== Behavior ==
Capuchins are arboreal, living mainly in trees.

=== Social ===
Capuchins live in groups consisting of about 3-30 individuals with a hierarchy determining their social status. There is usually an equal number of males to females living together with a male and female alpha. The rest of the individuals are lower in rank. The alpha male will defend his territory if approached by another group. Capuchins spend much of their time grooming each other as a means of socialization with the alpha getting the most attention. They often participate in "urine washing" by covering themselves in their own urine to mark their territory. This scent will travel with them.

=== Communication ===
Capuchins communicate making short and frequent yipping whines similar to a newborn pup. When in danger, they emit a two-toned clunking noise. Many of the noises Capuchins make are similar to bird sounds. They also communicate through chemical signals to express territory boundaries as well as during mating rituals.

=== Space use ===
S. xanthosternos will use forest areas with more cover and protection from predators, even if it means avoiding areas of high food availability. There are also behavioral differences when the capuchins are within different types of forest, such as being more spread out in the capruca while staying lower in the canopy and closer together in secondary forests. Capuchins will change strategies in order to reduce the risk that they perceive within their habitats.

=== Predation ===
Their coloration makes them camouflage into their habitat making them more difficult to spot by a predator. Predators of golden-bellied capuchins include large felids (jaguars, pumas, and ocelots), venomous and constricting snakes (rattlesnakes and boa constrictors), and large raptors (eagles and hawks). Near streams and pools, crocodiles can also be dangerous predators. The larger the group, the less chance they have of becoming prey due to a higher number of vigilant individuals. If a predator is spotted, the Capuchin will alert the others using their alarm call. Capuchins have acute olfactory senses helping them to distinguish scent marks left behind by other groups.

==== Hunting ====
Hunting is a major threat to S. xanthosternos and its ability to have populations survive long-term in forest fragments. Hunting is especially problematic in areas close to human activity such as agroforests (cabrucas) and farmland. There is an elevated perceived risk of predation in the capuchins behavior when it is in an area of forest that give a greater advantage to predators, such as reduced canopy coverage in cabruca and in areas that transition from other forest types to a cabruca.

=== Diet ===
Golden-bellied capuchins feed on both plant and animal origins making them omnivores. They mostly feed on plants such as fruits, seeds, flowers, nuts, leaves and stems, and nectar. They also eat insects, bird eggs, frogs, small reptiles, birds, bats, or other small mammals. Capuchins residing near marine areas will feed on oysters, crabs or other shellfish. Sapajus xanthosternos has been known to hunt and eat various small lizards, sometimes ripping limbs off of the lizards before consuming them.

=== Reproduction ===
Capuchins can mate year-round but females will give birth every two years. A female's gestation period is 150–180 days and give birth to one infant. Newborns are 100% reliant on their mothers for their first year of life and become independent around 6–12 months. Female Capuchins reach maturity around 4–5 years old and start mating and giving birth at 7–8 years old. Males reach maturity and are fertile around 6–8 years.

=== Mating ===
Capuchins mate with more than one partner making them polygynandrous. The alpha-male of the group always has first choice of which female will be his mate. The other males of the group are also sexually active but the alpha has the most reproductive success. The alpha-male is most desired by the females as he will provide the most protection to his young. Unique mating rituals occur in order for the female to attract a male. She will first raise her eyebrows and move her head back and forth. She will touch him and runaway while murmuring noises. The male will make eye contact with her and also make noises. They perform a dance just before mating by jumping and spinning in the air. Just after mating, they will continue the dance for several seconds.

=== Tool use ===
In part of their range, these capuchins select stones as hammers and use anvil surfaces to crack open hard-shelled fruits and nuts that would otherwise be inaccessible. Such tool use occurs in areas of harsher and longer dry seasons, suggesting it enables the capuchin to survive in lower-quality environments that would otherwise be too challenging to support it.

== Conservation ==
=== Status ===
The Capuchin is listed by the International Union for Conservation of Nature as critically endangered. The population of the Capuchin within the last 50 years has declined over 50%. Any remaining habitats are protected including the largest place called Una Biological Reserve in Bahia, Brazil, home to about 185 Capuchin.

=== Threats ===
Capuchins are endemic to Brazil's rainforests which are in danger of deforestation for agriculture and logging. This is causing fragmentation of the forests threatening their habitat. Groups of Capuchins are being separated from one another causing interbreeding which results in biodiversity loss ultimately causing an extinction vortex. Capuchins are also in danger of being hunted.

==== Pet trade ====
Capuchins are regularly captured in order to be sold in the illegal pet trade. In relation to species conservation it has been noted that the capture of a female creates a negative impact on a group's ability to survive than if a male is captured. Infants may also be sold into the pet trade, however this can be seen as a byproduct of hunting the mothers.

=== Current efforts ===
There is an effort in place by the Brazilian National Action Plan for the Conservation of the Northeastern Primates to protect a number of endangered primate species including S. xanthosternos.
