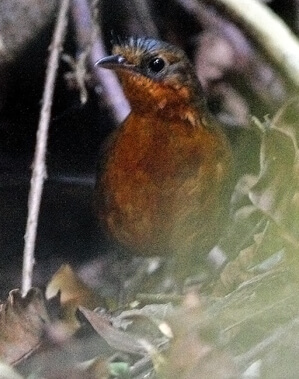

Conservation status
- Critically Endangered (IUCN 3.1)

Scientific classification
- Kingdom: Animalia
- Phylum: Chordata
- Class: Aves
- Order: Passeriformes
- Family: Rhinocryptidae
- Genus: Merulaxis
- Species: M. stresemanni

Binomial name
- Merulaxis stresemanni Sick, 1960

= Stresemann's bristlefront =

Species of bird

Stresemann's bristlefront (Merulaxis stresemanni) is a critically endangered species of bird in the family Rhinocryptidae, commonly known as tapaculos. It is endemic to Brazil, where there are 50 or fewer individuals living exclusively in the Mata do Passarinho Reserve.

== Taxonomy and systematics ==
Stresemann's bristlefront and the slaty bristlefront (Merulaxis ater) are sister species, the latter being significantly more common. Merulaxis stresemanni is currently considered monotypic, with no recognized subspecies.

The species is known from only three specimens, along with a handful of photographs, audio recordings, and documented sightings. The first specimen was acquired in the 1830s; subsequent specimens would not be collected until more than a century later. The species is difficult to identify, as is the case for other members of the tapaculo family.

== Description ==
Stresemann's bristlefront is a medium-sized, long-tailed bird with distinctive forehead bristles. It measures 20 cm (7.9 in) long. The male is all slaty gray with a dark rufous-chestnut rump, uppertail-coverts, and vent. The namesake features are long, pointed bristles on the forehead. The female is cinnamon-brown above, with a duskier tail, and is bright cinnamon below.

== Distribution and habitat ==
The Stresemann's bristlefront is endemic to the heavily fragmented Atlantic Forest biome of eastern Brazil. The species inhabits moist lowland forest, especially in areas characterized by dense understory and thick leaf litter.

Due to the ongoing destruction of the Atlantic Forest, one of the world’s most critically endangered biodiversity hotspots, the Stresemann's bristlefront faces an extreme risk of extinction. Approximately 90% of the original forest cover in the region has been cleared, leaving populations of endemic species like the bristlefront highly isolated and vulnerable.

=== Conservation efforts ===
In 2013, American Bird Conservancy estimated the world population to be 15 or fewer individuals. This makes the Stresemann's Bristlefront one of the rarest birds on Earth. It is classified as Critically Endangered by the International Union for Conservation of Nature (IUCN). The global population is estimated to number fewer than 50 mature individuals, and possibly as few as one confirmed bird remaining in the wild.

Historically, the species was known from a very limited number of locations, but its current confirmed range is now restricted to a single protected site: the Mata do Passarinho Reserve (also known as the Songbird Forest Reserve), which straddles the border between the states of Minas Gerais and Bahia.

Efforts to expand and preserve the Mata do Passarinho Reserve have been led by conservation organizations such as Fundação Biodiversitas and the American Bird Conservancy. In 2015, the reserve was expanded by an additional 766 acres (3.10 km^{2}) to protect the bristlefront's habitat and create a larger ecological corridor.

Despite formal legal protections, ongoing threats from habitat fragmentation, logging, and agricultural encroachment continue to jeopardize the species' survival. The IUCN notes: "Although this species is legally protected, there seems little hope for its survival."

== Behavior ==
The Stresemann's bristlefront is a cryptic and ground-dwelling species with secretive habits, making it difficult to observe in the wild. Much of its behavioral ecology remains poorly documented due to the scarcity of field encounters.

=== Feeding ===
Very little is known about the feeding behavior of Stresemann's bristlefront, but it has been observed to forage near fallen tree trunks, seemingly for arthropods.

=== Breeding ===
Breeding data on the Stresemann's bristlefront is extremely limited. The first known Stresemann's bristlefront nest site was a tunnel estimated to be 6 ft (1.8 m) long. The nest itself was not described.

=== Vocalization ===
The Stresemann's bristlefront song starts with clicks followed by a trill. It is similar to that of the closely related slaty bristlefront but lower pitched. It readily responds to playback.
