= List of state parks in São Paulo =

List of state parks in São Paulo

Currently, the state of São Paulo has 34 state parks, a category of conservation unit for integral protection of nature defined in the Law of the National System of Nature Conservation Units and classified as category II by the International Union for Conservation of Nature (IUCN). The basic objective of a state park is to preserve natural ecosystems of great ecological importance and scenic beauty, enabling scientific research and the development of environmental education and interpretation, recreation in contact with nature and ecological tourism. Among the state parks in São Paulo, 32 are managed by the Foundation for Conservation and Forestry Production of the State of São Paulo, which is linked to the Secretariat of the Environment of the Government of São Paulo. The other two parks, Albert Löfgren and Fontes do Ipiranga, are managed by the Forestry Institute and the Botanical Institute of São Paulo, respectively.

The first official state park was Campos do Jordão, created by Decree No. 11,908 issued on March 27, 1941, by Ademar Pereira de Barros. It was followed by Alto Ribeira Tourist in Iporanga, on May 19, 1958, and Jaraguá, on May 3, 1961, in the city of São Paulo. The smallest state park is the A.R.A., with just under 0.6 square kilometers, while the largest is the Serra do Mar, with over 3,000 square kilometers.

The two biomes found in the state are the Atlantic Forest and the Cerrado. Despite the considerable number of state parks, they protect less than 8,000 square kilometers of native vegetation. 30.4% of the city of São Paulo is covered by remnants of the Atlantic Forest, including large fragments in the Cantareira, Parque do Carmo and Parelheiros regions. The Jacupiranga, Serra de Paranapiacaba and Juréia-Itatins mosaics, composed of important state parks, also are UNESCO World Heritage Sites (Atlantic Forest Reserves of the Southeast).

From the original 33,979 square kilometers of Cerrado, less than 3,000 square kilometers remain (less than 1% of São Paulo's territory). Less than 0.5% is in conservation units, including state parks, which measure 50 square kilometers.

== State parks ==
Name	Image	Municipalities	Date of creation	Area	Description
Aguapeí		Castilho, Nova Independência, Guaraçaí, São João do Pau d'Alho, Monte Castelo and Junqueirópolis	July 2, 1998	9,034 hectares (90.34 km^{2})	Created by Companhia Energética de São Paulo (CESP) as compensation for the construction of the Engenheiro Sérgio Motta Hydroelectric Power Plant, it protects the floodplain ecosystems of the Aguapeí River, a tributary of the Paraná River. The region is one of the last places where the marsh deer still exists in the state of São Paulo.
Albert Löfgren		São Paulo	September 24, 1968	174 hectares (1.74 km^{2})	First conservation unit in the state of São Paulo. It was created on February 10, 1896, as a tribute to the Swedish botanist Albert Löfgren and became a state park in 1968. A small fragment of the Atlantic Forest, it belongs to the São Paulo City Green Belt Biosphere Reserve.
Assessoria de Referência Agrária		Valinhos	June 4, 1969	64.3 hectares (0.643 km^{2})	The smallest state park in São Paulo, it preserves a fragment of seasonal semideciduous forest. It was created as part of an agrarian reform initiative in the 1960s on the former Capivari Farm.
Campina do Encantado		Pariquera-Açu	August 16, 1994	2,360 hectares (23.6 km^{2})	Formerly the Pariquera Abaixo State Park, it preserves important portions of the floodplain forests of the Ribeira do Iguape river basin. It is notable for the presence of "turfeiras", which produce methane gas and can catch fire spontaneously with flames up to 80 centimeters high.
Campos do Jordão		Campos do Jordão	March 27, 1941	8,386 hectares (83.86 km^{2})	Regionally known as the Horto Florestal, it has the largest tracts of araucaria trees in Southeast Brazil. It is home to more than 180 species of birds, including the endangered vinaceous-breasted parrot.
Cantareira		São Paulo, Mairiporã, Caieiras and Garulhos	September 24, 1968	7,916.52 hectares (79.1652 km^{2})	One of the largest urban forests in the world, the park was preserved in the 19th century to guarantee the water supply for the city of São Paulo. Despite its proximity to the urban area, it is home to species threatened with extinction in the state, such as the puma. It is part of the São Paulo City Green Belt Biosphere Reserve.
Carlos Botelho		Capão Bonito, São Miguel Arcanjo and Sete Barras	September 10, 1982	37,644 hectares (376.44 km^{2})	Located in the Serra de Paranapiacaba, it is one of the largest fragments of Atlantic Forest in Brazil. It is recognized as a UNESCO World Heritage Site and has one of the largest populations of the southern muriqui.
Caverna do Diabo		Barra do Turvo, Cajati, Eldorado and Iporanga	February 21, 2008	40,219.66 hectares (402.1966 km^{2})	Part of the Jacupiranga Mosaic of Conservation Units, it preserves important stretches of Atlantic Forest on the south coast of São Paulo. The main tourist attraction is the cave system, including the Caverna da Tapagem, which is 6,000 meters long but only 600 meters open to visitors.
Fontes do Ipiranga		São Paulo	August 12, 1991	562 hectares (5.62 km^{2})	Located in the South Zone of São Paulo, it is historically important for protecting the sources of the Ipiranga River, where Brazil's independence was proclaimed. It is also home to the São Paulo Zoo and the Botanical Garden.
Furnas do Bom Jesus		Pedregulho	October 12, 1989	2,069 hectares (20.69 km^{2})	It preserves remnants of the Cerrado and has several waterfalls, such as the Cascata Grande, with a 132-meter free fall.
Ilha Anchieta		Ubatuba	March 29, 1977	828 hectares (8.28 km^{2})	Located on the north coast of São Paulo, it is one of the region's most important tourist attractions. It used to be inhabited by the Tupinambás indigenous people and contains the ruins of a prison that operated until 1955, closed after a major rebellion.
Ilha do Cardoso		Cananéia	July 3, 1962	22,500 hectares (225 km^{2})	Located at the southern end of the São Paulo coast, it preserves a great diversity of Atlantic Forest vegetation. It is home to rare species such as the red-tailed amazon and the broad-snouted caiman.
Ilhabela		Ilhabela	January 20, 1977	27,025 hectares (270.25 km^{2})	An archipelago park that protects 12 islands, including São Sebastião. It has a large number of endemic species.
Intervales		Eldorado, Guapiara, Iporanga, Ribeirão Grande and Sete Barras	June 8, 1995	49,000 hectares (490 km^{2})	One of the most important conservation units in the Serra de Paranapiacaba. It belongs to the Serra de Paranapiacaba Mosaic of Conservation Units and is a UNESCO World Heritage Site. It is one of the largest remnants of the Atlantic Forest and presents an excellent state of conservation.
Itaberaba		Arujá, Guarulhos, Mairiporã, Nazaré Paulista and Santa Isabel	March 30, 2010	15,113.11 hectares (151.1311 km^{2})	An important ecological corridor between the Serra da Cantareira and the Serra da Mantiqueira, it preserves important remnants of the Atlantic Forest. It is home to numerous endangered species in the state of São Paulo.
Itapetinga		Atibaia, Bom Jesus dos Perdões, Mairiporã and Nazaré Paulista	March 30, 2010	10,192 hectares (101.92 km^{2})	Together with the Cantareira and Itaberaba State Parks and the Pedra Grande State Natural Monument, it forms a mosaic of conservation units called the Contínuo Cantareira. It formalizes the protection of the forest remnants of the Serra do Itapetinga.
Itinguçu		Iguape and Peruíbe	April 8, 2013	5,040 hectares (50.4 km^{2})	It was created as part of the Juréia-Itatins Mosaic of Conservation Units on the south coast of São Paulo and conserves important Atlantic Forest vegetation
Jaraguá		Osasco and São Paulo	May 3, 1961	493 hectares (4.93 km^{2})	Conservation unit of the Contínuo Cantareira. Its main attraction is the Jaraguá Peak, which can be seen by visitors arriving in the city of São Paulo via the Anhanguera-Bandeirantes system.
Juqueri		Caieiras and Franco da Rocha	June 5, 1993	1,928 hectares (19.28 km^{2})	It preserves the last fragment of Cerrado in the São Paulo Metropolitan Region. The seriema, a typical Cerrado bird, is its symbol. The main attraction is an elevation called Ovo da Pata.
Jurupará		Ibiúna and Piedade	September 22, 1992	26,251 hectares (262.51 km^{2})	Formerly an extractive reserve, it is an important ecological corridor between the Serra de Paranapiacaba and the Serra do Mar. Hydroelectric power stations built between the 40s and 60s are located on the park's outskirts.
Lagamar de Cananéia		Jacupiranga and Cananéia	February 21, 2008	40,759 hectares (407.59 km^{2})	It forms part of the Jacupiranga Mosaic of Conservation Units and is one of the largest tracts of Atlantic Forest in Brazil. Important for maintaining marine ecosystems and habitat for the critically endangered black-faced lion tamarin.
Manancias de Campos do Jordão		Campos de Jordão	September 27, 1993	503 hectares (5.03 km^{2})	Created with the aim of preserving the surroundings of the Salto Dam, which supplies up to 30% of the city of Campos do Jordão. Visitors are not allowed and the area has an extensive pine plantation.
Laje de Santos Marine		Santos	September 27, 1993	5,000 hectares (50 km^{2})	The only marine state park in the state of São Paulo, it preserves coral reefs. An important tourist spot for scuba diving, mainly due to the visibility of the park's waters.
Morro do Diabo		Teodoro Sampaio	June 4, 1986	33,845 hectares (338.45 km^{2})	Located in Pontal do Paranapanema, it preserves the largest remnant of Atlantic Forest in all of western São Paulo and the largest reserve of peroba-rosa in the state. It is home to the black lion tamarin, the only primate endemic to the state of São Paulo, where there is currently the largest free-roaming population.
Nascentes do Paranapanema		Capão Bonito	June 21, 2012	22,698.94 hectares (226.9894 km^{2})	It was created to protect the water sources that supply the Paranapanema River. It forms part of the Serra de Paranapiacaba Mosaic of Conservation Units.
Porto Ferreira		Porto Ferreira	November 6, 1962	612 hectares (6.12 km^{2})	Located on the banks of the Mojiguaçu River, it preserves small portions of Cerrado and seasonal semideciduous forest. Despite its small area, it has a great diversity of tree species, such as the jequitibá-rosa and the peroba-rosa.
Prelado		Iguape	April 8, 2013	1,828 hectares (18.28 km^{2})	One of the conservation units that constitutes the Jureia-Itatins Mosaic, which aims to preserve the last stretches of forest on the São Paulo coast.
Restinga de Bertioga		Bertioga	December 9, 2010	9,312.32 hectares (93.1232 km^{2})	Created to protect the restinga ecosystem in the city of Bertioga. It is an ecological corridor between coastal ecosystems and the Serra do Mar.
Rio do Peixe		Ouro Verde, Dracena, Presidente Venceslau and Piquerobi	September 18, 2002	7,720 hectares (77.2 km^{2})	Created by Companhia Energética de São Paulo (CESP) as compensation for the construction of the Engenheiro Sérgio Motta Hydroelectric Power Plant, it protects the floodplain ecosystems of the Aguapeí River, a tributary of the Paraná River. Together with the Aguapeí State Park, it preserves the last stretches of floodplain ecosystems that used to exist on most of the rivers that flowed into the Paraná River.
Rio Turvo		Barra do Turvo, Cajati and Jacupiranga	February 21, 2008	73,894 hectares (738.94 km^{2})	Part of the Jacupiranga Mosaic of Conservation Units, it preserves important stretches of Atlantic Forest on the south coast of São Paulo. It has diverse flora and preserves the Turvo river basin, a tributary of the Ribeira do Iguape River.
Serra do Mar		Caraguatatuba, Cunha, São Paulo, Juquitiba, Mongaguá, Itanhaém, Cubatão, Pedro de Toledo, Ubatuba, São Luiz do Paraitinga and São Sebastião	August 30, 1977	315,391 hectares (3,153.91 km^{2})	The largest integral conservation unit in the state of São Paulo, it is the largest continuous stretch of Atlantic Forest in Brazil. An important area in terms of tourism, conservation of biodiversity and water sources.
Alto Ribeira Tourist		Apiaí and Iporanga	May 19, 1958	35,884 hectares (358.84 km^{2})	One of the oldest state parks in São Paulo, it has a complex system of caves. It features one of the best-preserved stretches of Atlantic Forest and contains species typical of primary forests and animals that require large territories, such as the jaguar and the southern muriqui. It is a UNESCO World Heritage Site.
Vassununga		Santa Rita do Passa Quadro	October 26, 1970	1,732 hectares (17.32 km^{2})	It preserves significant portions of seasonal semideciduous forest and Cerrado and has the largest population of jequitibá-rosa in the state. It is also home to the largest and oldest specimen of this species, known as the Patriarca.
Xixová-Japuí		Praia Grande and São Vicente	September 27, 1993	901 hectares (9.01 km^{2})	Located in the Metropolitan Region of Baixada Santista, it is a fragment of Atlantic Forest that is highly visited due to easy access.

== See also ==
- List of Atlantic Forest conservation units
- National System of Nature Conservation Units
