= Cerrado =

Tropical savanna ecoregion of Brazil

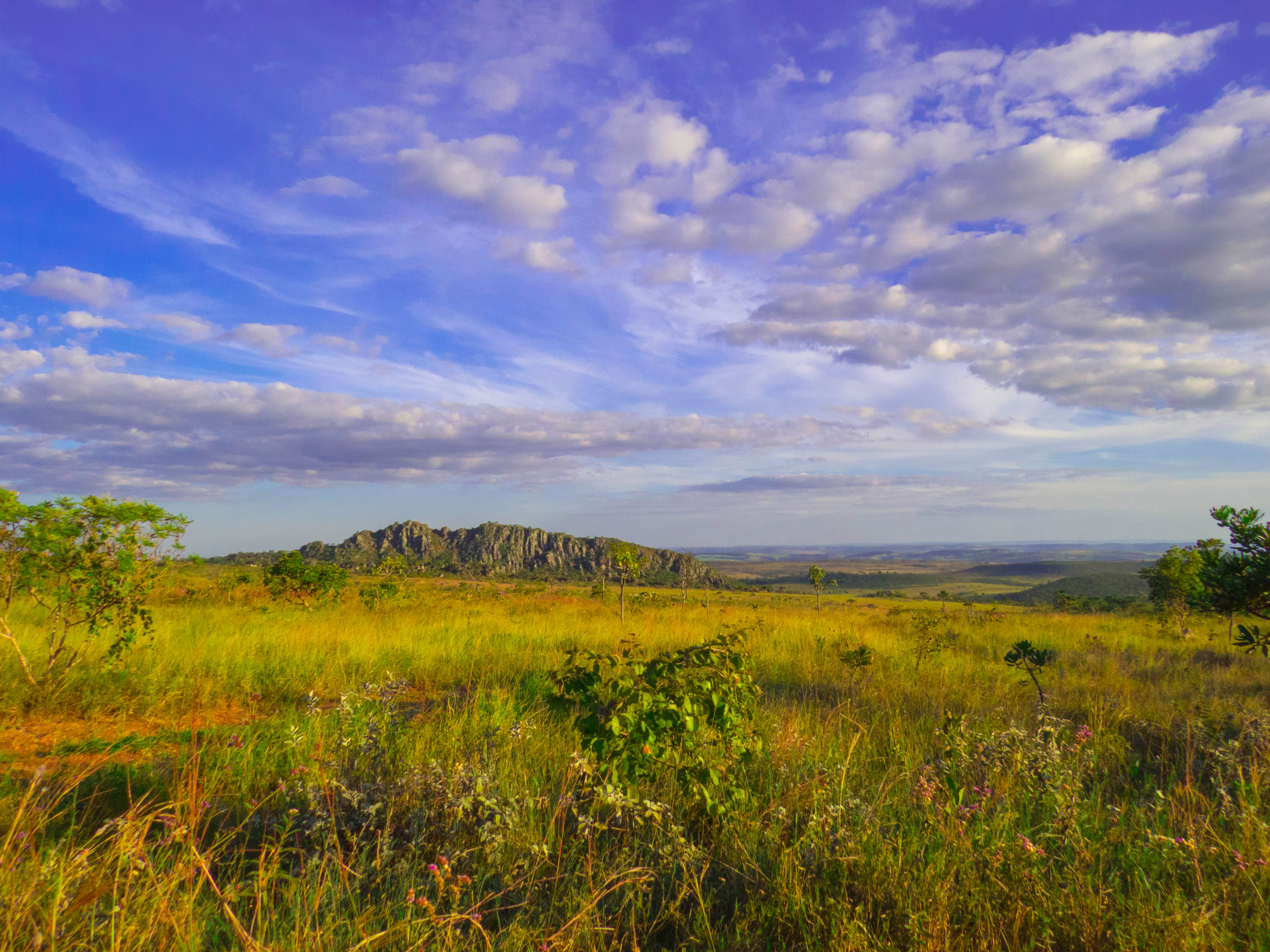
- Vegetation in Pirineus State Park, Goiás

- Map of the Cerrado ecoregion as delineated by the World Wide Fund for Nature.

Ecology
- Realm: Neotropical
- Biome: tropical and subtropical grasslands, savannas, and shrublands
- Borders: List: Alto Paraná Atlantic forests; Araucaria moist forests; Bahia interior forests; Atlantic dry forests; Caatinga; Chiquitano dry forests; Humid Chaco; Maranhão Babaçu forests; Mato Grosso tropical dry forests; Pantanal

Geography
- Area: 1,910,037 km^{2} (737,469 mi^{2})
- Countries: Brazil; Bolivia; Paraguay

Conservation
- Conservation status: Vulnerable
- Global 200: Cerrado woodlands and savannas
- Protected: 433,581 km^{2} (43,358,100 ha; 167,407 mi^{2}) (23%)

The Cerrado (Portuguese pronunciation: [seˈʁadu]) (lit. "closed," "dense") is a vast ecoregion of tropical savanna in central Brazil, being present in the states of Goiás, Mato Grosso do Sul, Mato Grosso, Tocantins, Maranhão, Piauí, Bahia, Minas Gerais, São Paulo, Paraná and the Federal District. The core areas of the Cerrado biome are the Brazilian Highlands – the Planalto. The main habitat types of the Cerrado consist of forest savanna, wooded savanna, park savanna and gramineous-woody savanna. The Cerrado also includes savanna wetlands and gallery forests.

The second largest of Brazil's major habitat types, after the Amazonian rainforest, the Cerrado accounts for a full 21 percent of the country's land area (extending marginally into Paraguay and Bolivia). About 75% of the Cerrado’s 2 million km^{2} is privately owned.

Vast amounts of research have shown that the Cerrado is one of the richest of all tropical savanna regions and has high levels of endemism. Characterizing it by its enormous ranges of plant and animal biodiversity, World Wide Fund for Nature named the Cerrado the biologically richest savanna in the world, with about 10,000 plant species and 10 endemic bird species. There are nearly 200 species of mammal in the Cerrado, though only 14 are endemic. The large fraction of private ownership makes protection difficult, however. The soil of its peatland areas can be especially dense and thus are a particularly potent carbon sink. Persistently drier conditions in the wetland areas or in upstream feedwater sources, as may occur with climate change or due to habitat destruction, would erode this carbon storage which is six times more potent per a similar sized parcel than is the Amazon rainforest.

== Climate ==
The Cerrado's climate is typical of the wetter savanna regions of the world, with a semi-humid tropical climate. The Cerrado is limited to two dominant seasons throughout the year: Wet and dry. Annual temperatures for the Cerrado average between 22 and 27 °C and average precipitation between 80–200 cm for over 90% of the area. This ecoregion has a very strong dry season during the southern winter (approx. April–September).

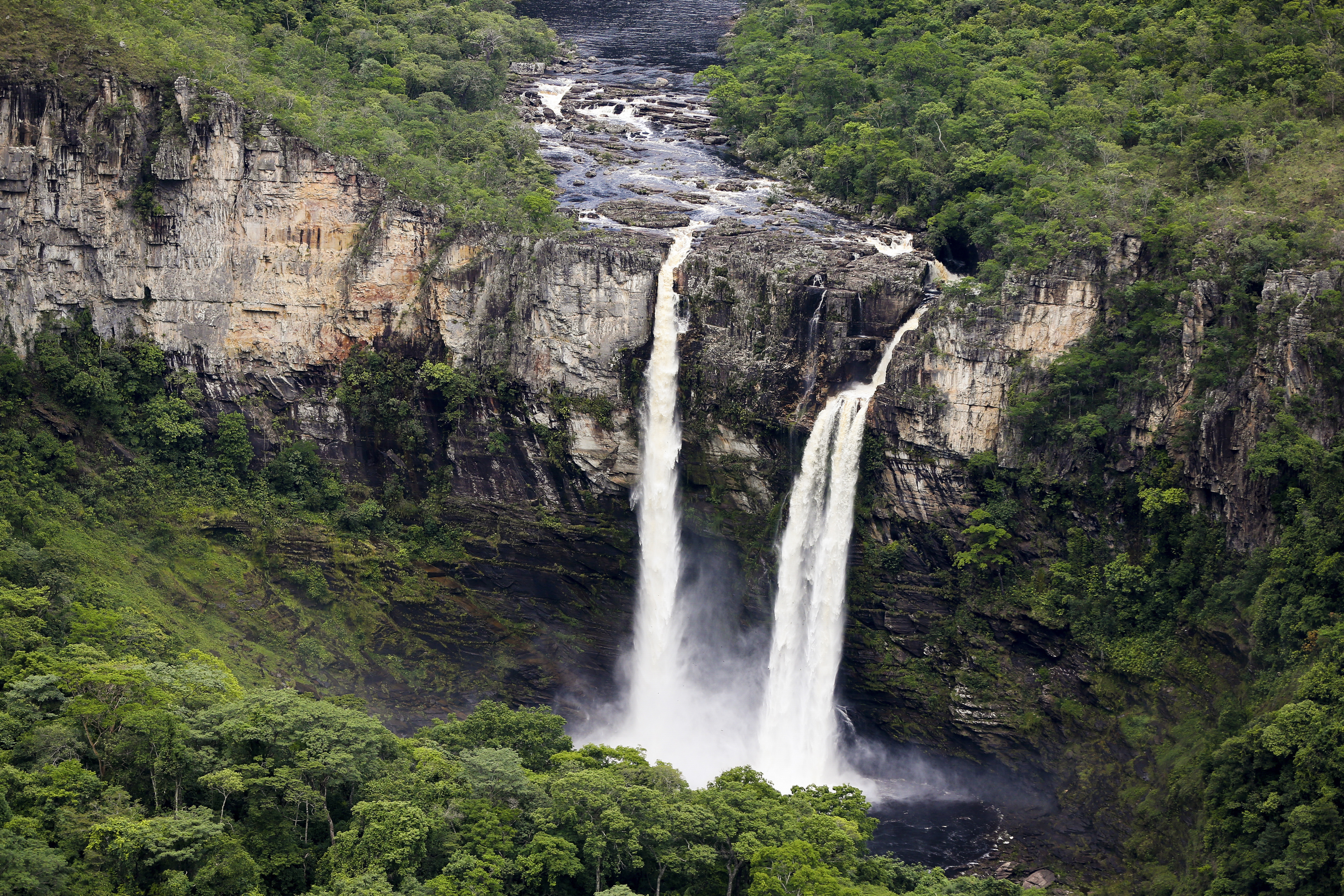
Green vegetation during the summer, Chapada dos Veadeiros, Goiás, Brazil

== Flora ==
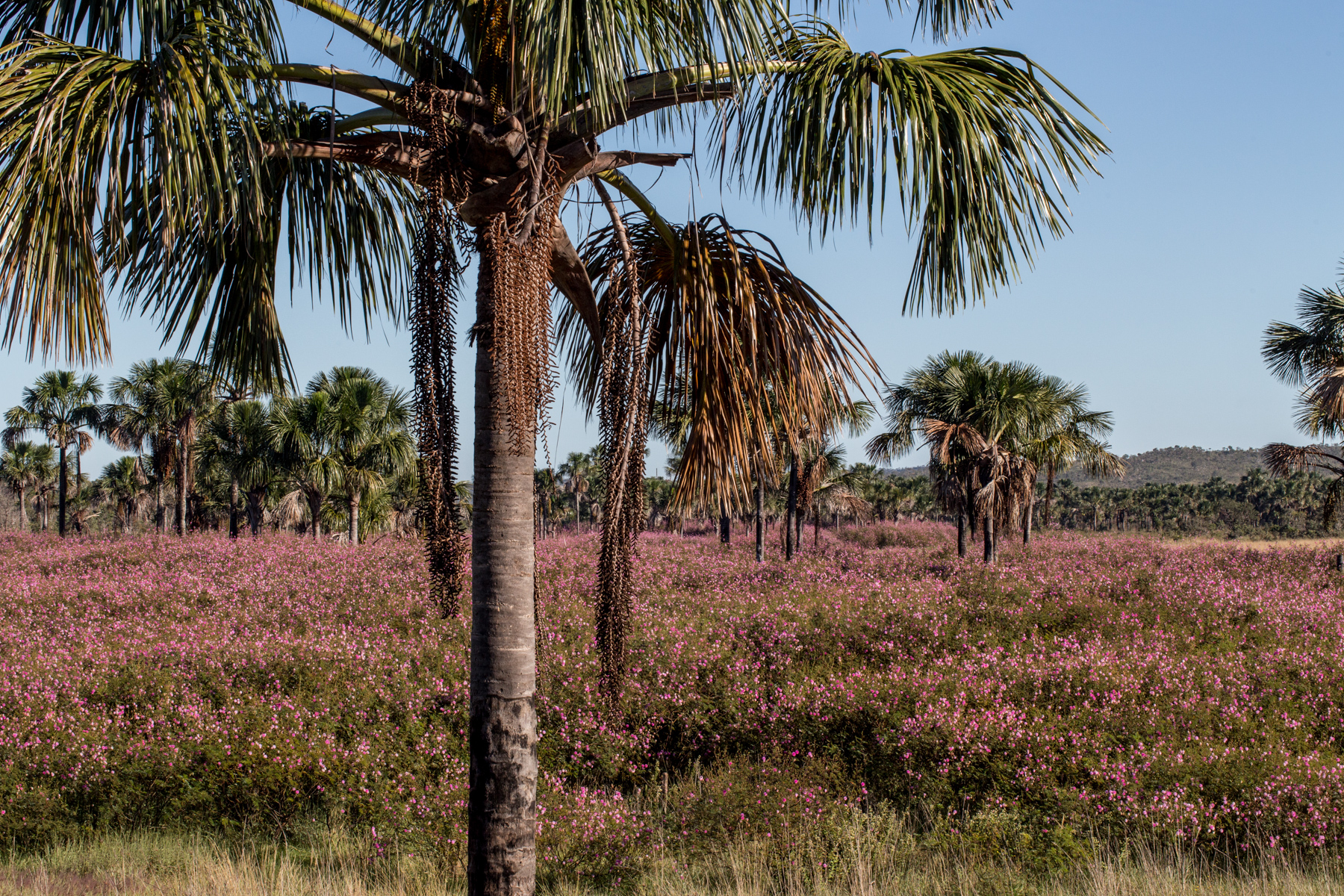
Fields of flowers in bloom during spring, Chapada dos Veadeiros, Goiás, Brazil

The Cerrado is characterized by unique vegetation types. It is composed of a shifting mosaic of habitats, with the savanna-like cerrado itself on well-drained areas between strips of gallery forest (closed canopy tall forest) which occur along streams. Between the cerrado and the gallery forest is an area of vegetation known as the wet campo with distinct up- and downslope borders where tree growth is inhibited due to wide seasonal fluctuations in the water table.

The savanna portion of the Cerrado is heterogeneous in terms of canopy cover. Goodland (1971) divided the Cerrado into four categories ranging from least to most canopy cover: campo sujo (herbaceous layer with occasional small trees about 3 m tall), campo cerrado (slightly higher density of trees about 4 m tall on average), cerrado sensu stricto (orchard-like vegetation with trees about 6 m high) and cerradão (canopy cover near 50% with general height 9 m).

Probably around 800 species of trees are found in the Cerrado. Among the most diverse families of trees in the Cerrado are the Leguminosae (153 spp.), Malpighiaceae (46), Myrtaceae (43), Melastomataceae (32), and Rubiaceae (30). Much of the Cerrado is dominated by the Vochysiaceae (23 species in the Cerrado) due to the abundance of three species in the genus Qualea. The herbaceous layer usually reaches about 60 cm in height and is composed mainly of the Poaceae, Cyperaceae, Leguminosae, Compositae, Myrtaceae and Rubiaceae. Much of the vegetation in the gallery forests is similar to nearby rainforest; however, there are some endemic species found only in the Cerrado gallery forests.

Soil fertility, fire regime and hydrology are thought to be most influential in determining Cerrado vegetation. Cerrado soils are always well-drained and most are oxisols with low pH and low calcium and magnesium. The amount of potassium, nitrogen and phosphorus has been found to be positively correlated with tree trunk basal area in Cerrado habitats. Much as in other grasslands and savannas, fire is important in maintaining and shaping the Cerrado's landscape; many plants in the Cerrado are fire-adapted, exhibiting characters like thick corky bark to withstand the heat.

Cerrado vegetation is believed to be ancient, stretching back perhaps as far in a prototypic form as the Cretaceous, before Africa and South America separated. A dynamic expansion and contraction between cerrado and Amazonian rainforest has probably occurred historically, with expansion of the Cerrado during glacial periods like the Pleistocene. These processes and the resulting fragmentation in multiple refugia have probably contributed to the high species richness both of the Cerrado and of the Amazonian rainforest.

== Fauna ==
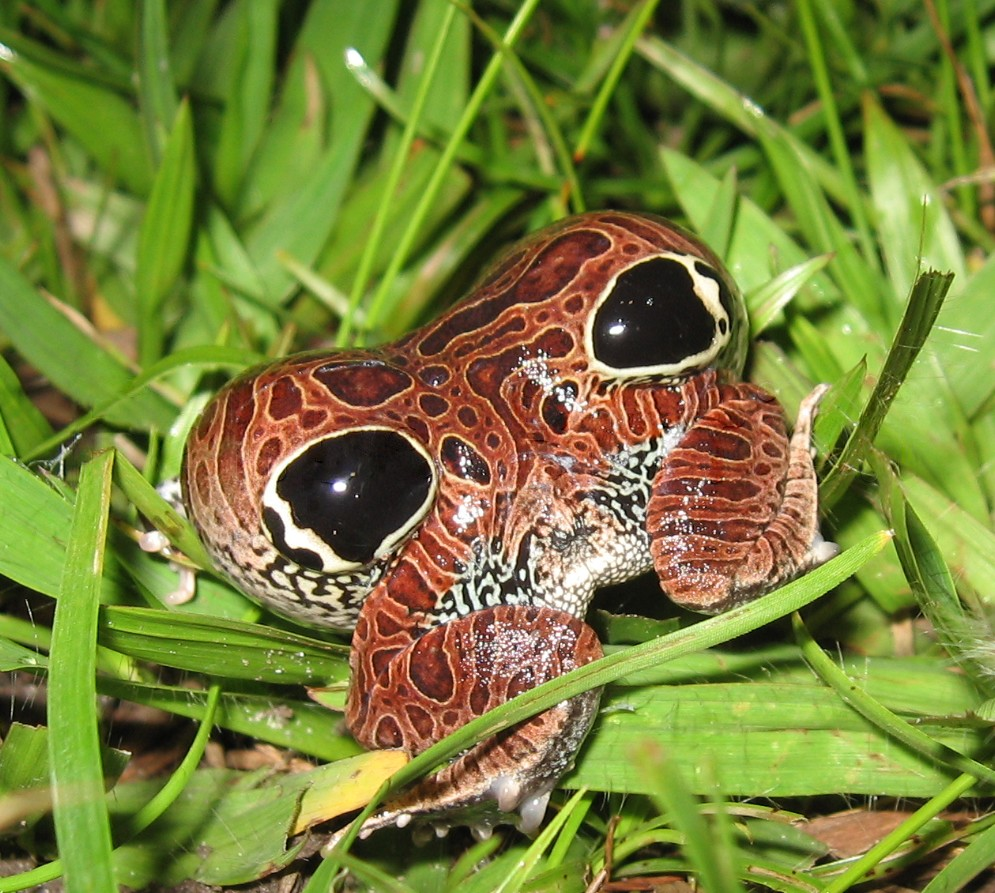
The frog species Physalaemus nattereri (posterior view shown) is found in the open cerrado, but not in adjacent gallery forests

The Cerrado has a high diversity of vertebrates, with 150 amphibian species, 120 reptile species, 837 bird species, and 161 mammal species recorded. Lizard diversity is generally thought to be relatively low in the Cerrado compared to other areas like caatinga or lowland rainforest, although one recent study found 57 species in one cerrado area with the high diversity driven by the availability of open habitat. Ameiva ameiva is among the largest lizards found in the Cerrado and is the most important lizard predator where it is found in the Cerrado. There is a relatively high diversity of snakes in the Cerrado (22–61 species, depending on site) with Colubridae being the richest family. The open nature of the cerrado vegetation most likely contributes to the high diversity of snakes. Information about Cerrado amphibians is extremely limited, although the Cerrado probably has a unique assemblage of species with some endemic to the region.

Most birds found in the Cerrado breed there although there are some Austral migrants (breed in temperate South America and winter in the Amazon basin) and Nearctic migrants (breed in temperate North America and winter in the Neotropics) that pass through. Most breeding birds in the Cerrado are found in more closed canopy areas like gallery forests although 27% of the birds breed only in open habitats and 21% breed in either open or closed habitats. Many of the birds in the Cerrado, especially those found in closed forest, are related to species from the Atlantic rainforest and also the Amazon rainforest. The crowned solitary eagle, hyacinth macaw, toco toucan, buff-necked ibis, dwarf tinamou, and Brazilian merganser are examples of birds found in the Cerrado.

Gallery forests serve as primary habitat for most of the mammals in the Cerrado, having more water, being protected from fires that sweep the landscape and having a more highly structured habitat. Eleven mammal species are endemic to the Cerrado. Notable species include large herbivores like the Brazilian tapir and Pampas deer and large predators like the maned wolf, cougar, jaguar, giant otter, ocelot and jaguarundi. Although the diversity is much lower than in the adjacent Amazon and Atlantic Forest, several species of monkeys are present, including black-striped capuchin, black howler monkey and black-tufted marmoset.

The insects of the Cerrado are relatively understudied. A yearlong survey of the Cerrado at one reserve in Brazil found that the orders Coleoptera, Hymenoptera, Diptera and Isoptera accounted for 89.5% of all captures. The Cerrado also supports a high density (up to 4000 per hectare) of the nests of leaf cutter ants (saúvas), which are also very diverse. Along with termites, leaf cutter ants are the primary herbivores of the Cerrado and play an important role in consuming and decomposing organic matter, as well as constituting an important food source to many other animal species. The highest diversity of galling insects (insects that build galls) in the world is also found in the Cerrado, with the most species (46) found at the base of the Serra do Cipó in southeast Brazil.

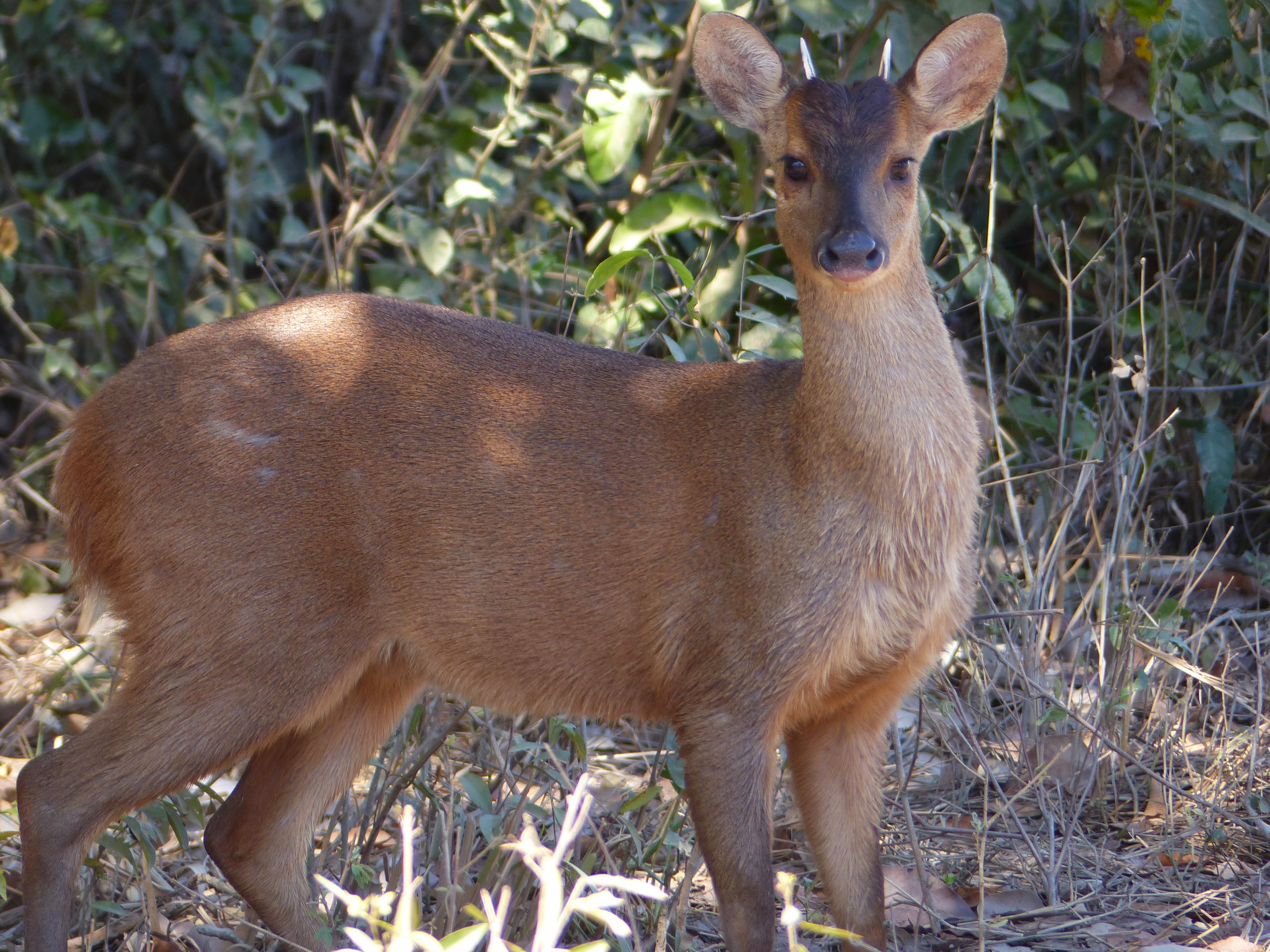
Red brocket

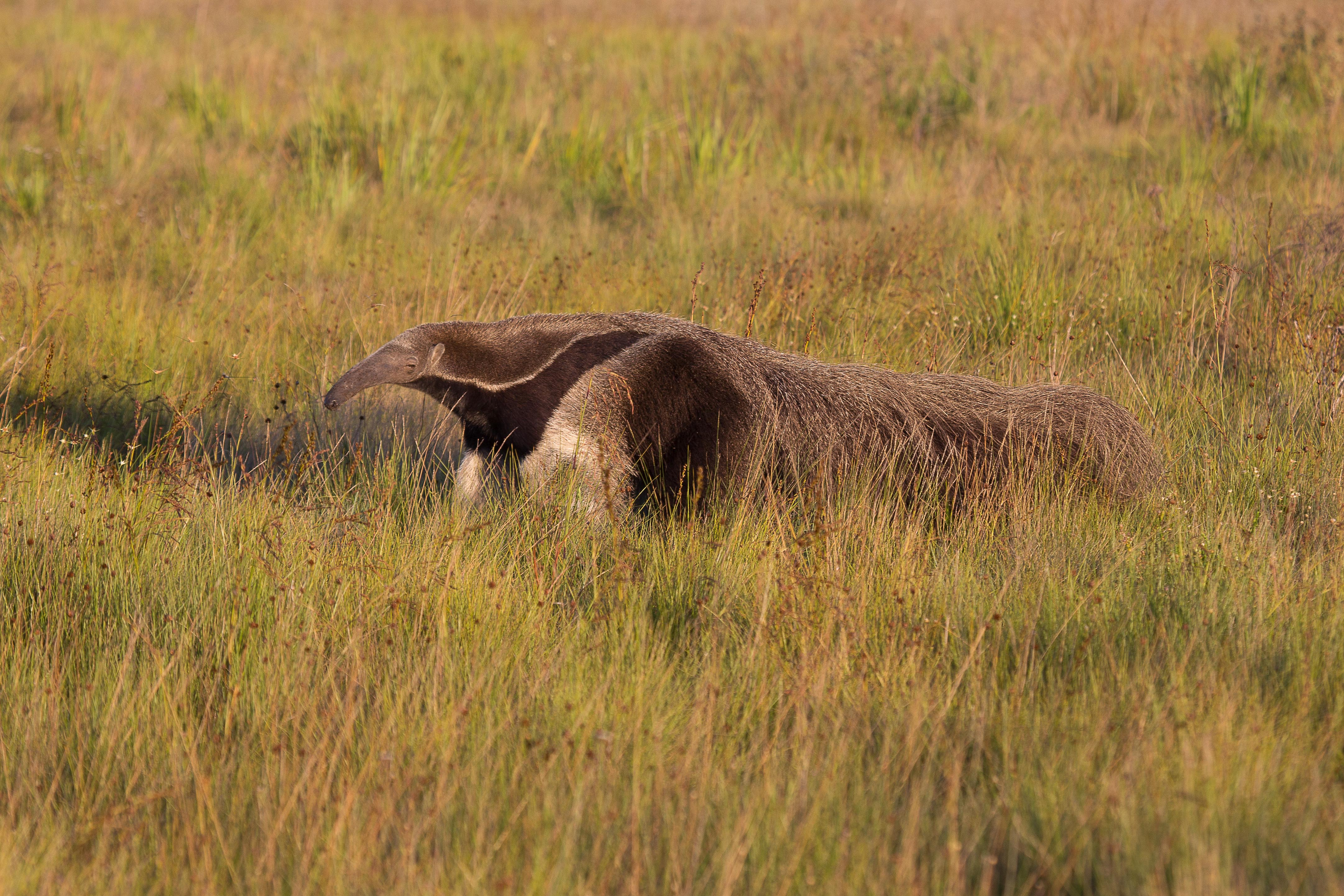
Giant anteater

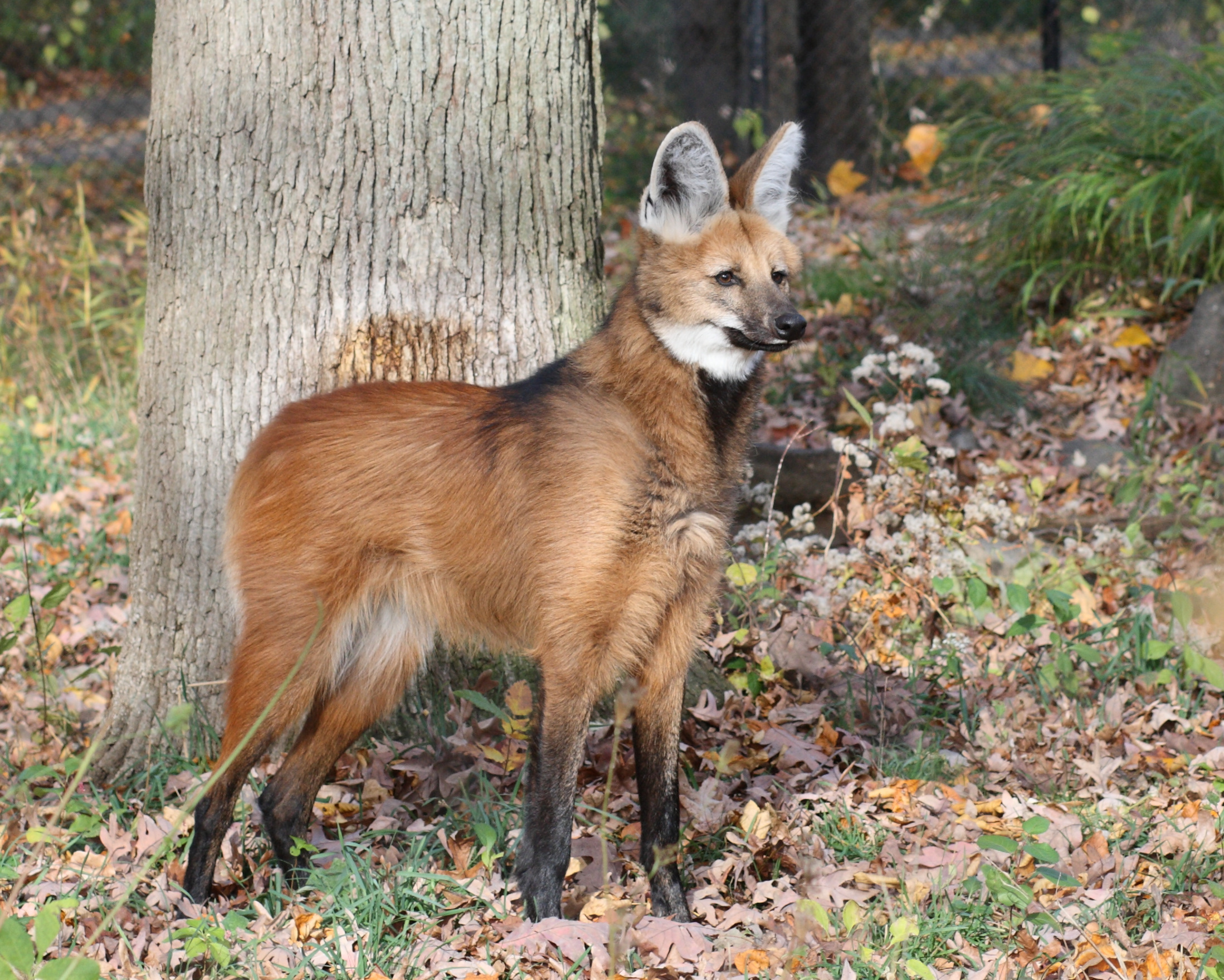
Maned wolf

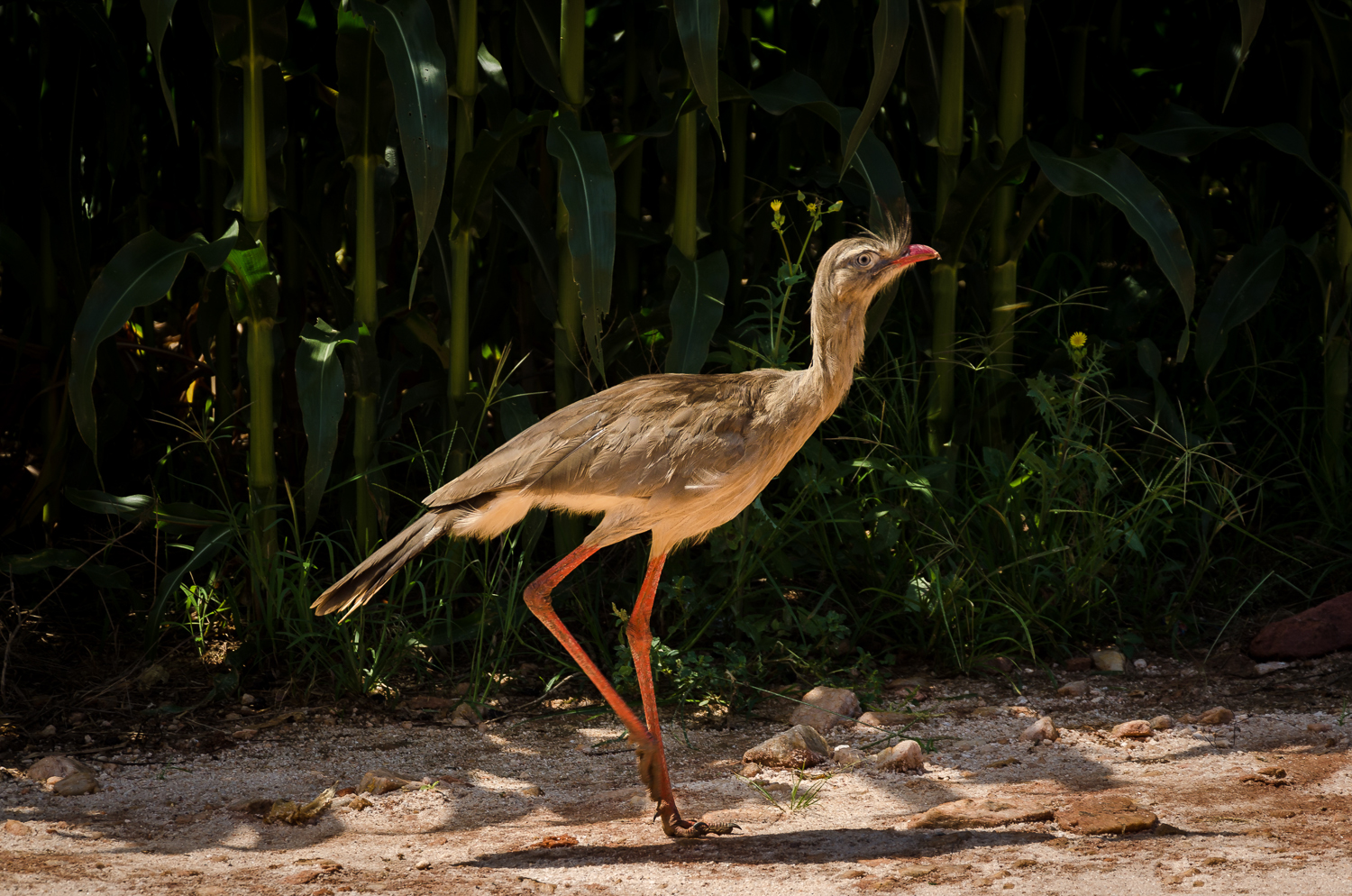
Seriema

== History and human population ==
The first detailed European account of the Brazilian cerrados was provided by Danish botanist Eugenius Warming (1892) in the book Lagoa Santa, in which he describes the main features of the cerrado vegetation in the state of Minas Gerais.

Taking advantage of the sprouting of the herbaceous stratum that follows a burning in the Cerrado, the aboriginal inhabitants of these regions learned to use fire as a tool, to increase the fodder to offer to their domesticated animals.

Xavantes, Tapuias, Karajás, Avá-Canoeiros, Krahôs, Xerentes, Xacriabás were some of the first indigenous peoples occupying different regions in the Cerrado. Many groups among the indigenous were nomads and explored the Cerrado by hunting and collecting. Others practiced coivara agriculture, an itinerant type of slash-and-burn agriculture. The mixing of indigenous, quilombola maroon communities, extractivists, geraizeiros (living in the drier regions), riverbank dwellers and vazanteiros (living on floodplains) shaped a diverse local population that relies heavily on the resources of their environment.

Until the mid-1960s, agricultural activities in the Cerrado were very limited, since natural cerrado soils are not fertile enough for crop production, directed mainly at the extensive production of beef cattle for subsistence of the local market. After this period, however, the urban and industrial development of the Southeast Region has forced agriculture to the Central-West Region. The transfer of the country's capital to Brasília has been another focus of attraction of population to the central region: From 1975 until the beginning of the 1980s, many governmental subsidy programs were launched to promote agriculture, with the intent of stimulating the development of the Cerrado region. As a result, there has been a significant increase in agricultural and cattle production.

On the other hand, the urban pressure and the rapid establishment of agricultural activities in the region have been rapidly reducing the biodiversity of the ecosystems, and the population in the Cerrado region more than doubled from 1970 to 2010, going from 35.8 to 76 million.

== Rivers ==
The Cerrado biome is strategic for the water resources of Brazil. The biome contains the headwaters and the largest portion of South American watersheds (the Paraná-Paraguay, Araguaia-Tocantins, and São Francisco river basins) and the upper catchments of large Amazon tributaries, such as the Xingu and Tapajós. During the last four decades, the Cerrado’s river basins have been highly impacted by extreme deforestation, expansion of the agricultural and cattle ranching frontier, construction of dams, and extraction of water for irrigation.

== Commercial activity ==
=== Agriculture ===
The soil in the Cerrado had historically been challenging for agriculture until researchers at Brazil's agricultural and livestock research agency, Embrapa, discovered that it could be made fit for industrial crops by appropriate additions of phosphorus and lime. In the late 1990s, between 14 million and 16 million tons of lime were being poured on Brazilian fields each year. The quantity rose to 25 million tons in 2003 and 2004, equaling around five tons of lime per hectare. This manipulation of the soil allowed for industrial agriculture to grow exponentially in the area. Researchers also developed tropical varieties of soybeans, until then a temperate crop, and currently, Brazil is the world's main soyabeans exporter due to the boom in animal feed production caused by the global rise in meat demand.

Today the Cerrado region provides more than 70% of the beef cattle production in the country, being also a major production center of grains, mainly soya, beans, maize, and rice. Large extensions of the Cerrado are also used for the production of cellulose pulp for the paper industry, with the cultivation of several species of eucalyptus and pines, but as a secondary activity. Coffee produced in the Cerrado is now a major export.

During the last 25 years this biome has been increasingly threatened by industrial monoculture farming, particularly soybeans, the unregulated expansion of industrial agriculture, the burning of vegetation for charcoal and the development of dams to provide irrigation are drawing criticisms and have been identified as potential threats to several Brazilian rivers. When the native forests are removed, it makes droughts more persistent in the region, making the local agricultural industry less productive, because of a reduction in local evapotranspiration effecting regional water cycles.

This industrial farming of the Cerrado, with the clearing of land for eucalyptus and soy plantations, has grown so much because of various forms of subsidy, including very generous tax incentives and low interest loans. This has resulted in the establishment of a highly mechanized, capital intensive system of agriculture. There is also a strong agribusiness lobby in Brazil and in particular, the production of soybeans in the Cerrado is influenced by large corporations such as ADM, Cargill and Bunge, these latter two directly associated with the mass deforestation of this biome. In the Cerrado/MATOPIBA agricultural frontier, Conservation International Brazil served as an implementing partner for the UNDP–GEF project Taking Deforestation Out of the Soy Supply Chain, intended to reduce deforestation pressures associated with soy expansion and promote more sustainable production at a landscape scale.

=== Charcoal production ===
Charcoal production for Brazil's steel industry is a significant income generating activity in the Cerrado. It is closely interwined with agriculture. When land is cleared for agricultural land use, the tree's trunks and roots are often used in the production of charcoal, financing the clearing. The Brazilian steel industry has traditionally used the trunks and roots from the Cerrado for charcoal, but now that the steel mills in the state of Minas Gerais are among the world's largest, it has taken a much higher toll on the Cerrado. Due to conservation efforts and the diminishing vegetation in the Cerrado, charcoal is increasingly sourced from the eucalyptus plantations.

== Conservation ==
=== Ecological trends and challenges ===
The Cerrado is the second-largest biome in South America and the most biodiverse savanna in the world. It encompasses the Guarani Aquifer and holds the largest underground freshwater reservoirs on the continent. The Cerrado also plays a crucial hydrological role, supplying water to one-third of the Amazon River and supporting several of South America's major river basins.

Despite its ecological importance, Brazilian agricultural policies and land-use planning have historically regarded the Cerrado as having low conservation value. As a result, only 1.5% of the biome is protected under federal reserves. By 1994, roughly 695,000 km^{2} (69,500,000 ha), representing 35% of its total area, had already been converted to anthropogenic landscapes. In total, 37.3% of the Cerrado has been completely converted for human use, while an additional 41.4% is used for extensive pasture and charcoal production.

The biome’s gallery forests are among the most degraded ecosystems. As of recent estimates, only 432,814 km^{2} (43,281,400 ha)—or 21.3% of the original vegetation—remains intact. Vegetation loss continues at an alarming rate, with projections suggesting that a further 31–34% of the remaining biome could be cleared by 2050 if current trends persist. This change is largely being driven by expansion of soy production. When the native forests are removed, it makes droughts more persistent in the region, making the local agricultural industry less productive, because of a reduction in local evapotranspiration effecting regional water cycles..

2019 and 2023, studies have shown that approximately 19% of the Cerrado, around 17 million hectares, exhibits significant woody plant encroachment. This densification, marked by a 40% increase in wood cover, has led to a reduction in plant diversity by about 30%.

One of the key challenges in establishing effective nature reserves in the Cerrado lies in its floristic heterogeneity and complex mosaic of vegetation types, which complicates the selection of representative conservation areas. To address this, collaborative efforts have been underway involving the University of Brasília, Embrapa's Cerrado Research Center (CPAC), and the Royal Botanic Garden Edinburgh, supported by Brazilian, European, and British funding. These partnerships have expanded into a major Anglo-Brazilian initiative titled "Conservation and Management of the Biodiversity of the Cerrado Biome", funded by the UK Overseas Development Administration. The project's primary objective is to survey floristic patterns, identify biodiversity hotspots, and recommend priority areas for conservation.

=== Protected areas ===
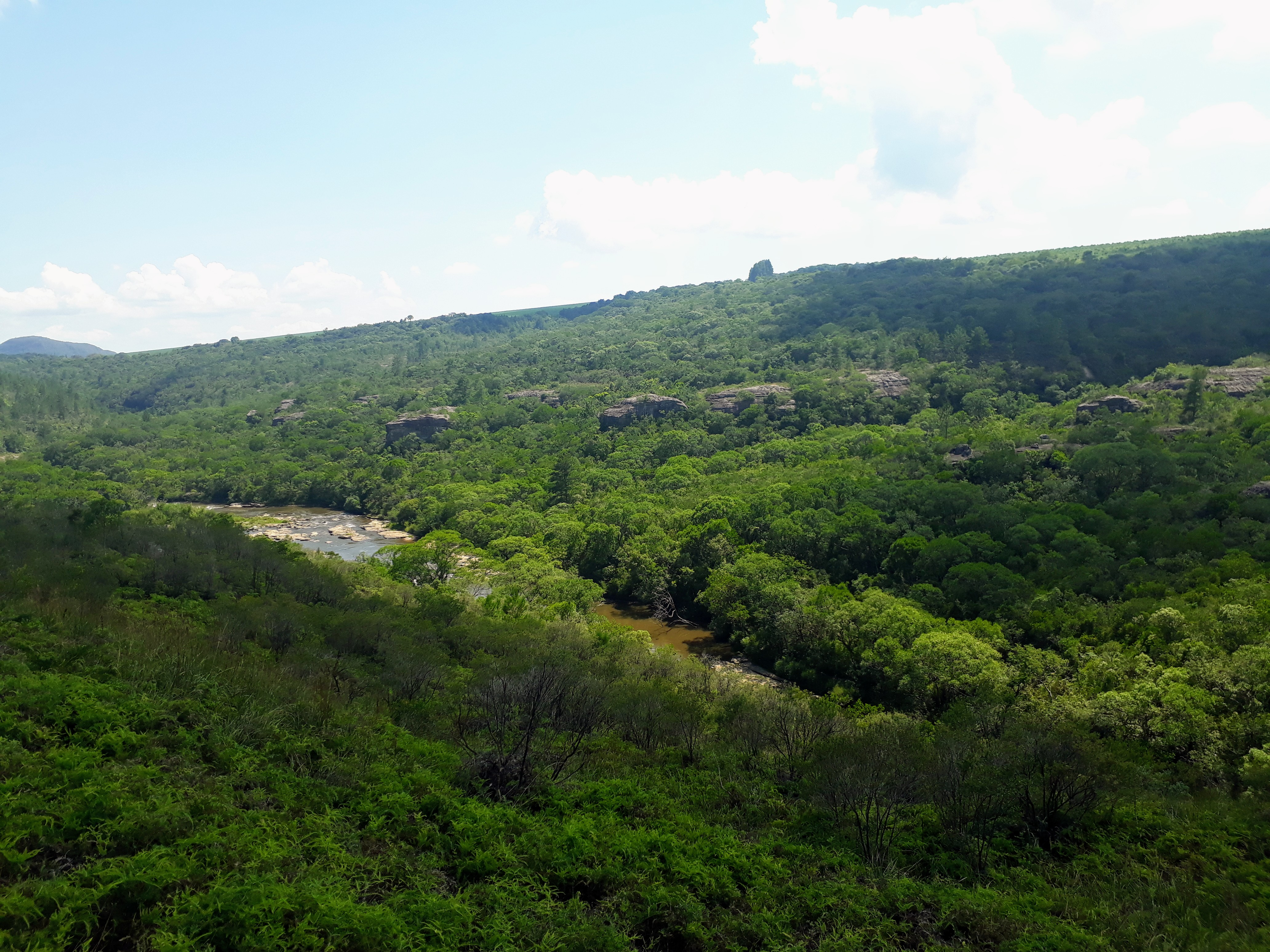
A State Park in the Cerrado - Protected Area

According to Brazil's National Registry of Conservation Units (Portuguese: Cadastro Nacional de Unidades de Conservação), there are, as of November 2024, 560 protected areas within the Cerrado biome. In Brazil, protected areas are known as conservation units, and those in the Cerrado account for 19% of all units in the country. While a 2017 assessment found that 433,581 km^{2} (43,358,100 ha), or 23% of the ecoregion, is in protected areas, these registered conservation units make up roughly 17,960,000 ha (179,600 km^{2}) of land, which represents about 9% of the total area of the Cerrado. Despite its ecological importance, the Cerrado is not recognized by the Brazilian Constitution as a National Heritage.

The first protected area in the Brazilian Cerrado was the Paraobepa National Forest which was established in 1950. Until the early 1990’s, the progression of the network was slow, with only a handful of protected areas established each year. During the late 1990’s and early 2000’s there was a boom of new protected areas, which coincides with the passing of Law No. 9.985, of July 18, 2000. This law established the National System of Nature Conservation Units (SNUC) and defines the concepts for the creation and management of conservation units in Brazil, marking the beginning of their legal regulation. Between 1997 and 2006, a total of 179 conservation units were established in the Cerrado, accounting for almost one third of the entire current network. Since this boom, the rate at which new conservation units are created each year has slowed down but varies considerably from year to year.

==== Types of protected areas ====
Protected areas in Brazil are overseen by the National System of Nature Conservation Units, a branch of the Ministry of Environment and Climate Change.

There are two groups of conservation units in Brazil, namely Integral Protection (IP) and Sustainable Protection (SP). Integral protection units exist to protect nature, and use of their resources is limited to recreation and tourism. Sustainable protection units aim to reconcile the conservation of nature with the sustainable use of its natural resources. Out of the 560 conservation units in the Cerrado, there are 176 integral protection units and 384 sustainable protection units. Within each type of conservation unit, there exist several categories, which are each associated with a category of the IUCN protected area classification system.

All categories of conservation units can exist at the federal, state, or municipal level. Federal conservation units are managed by the Chico Mendes Institute for Biodiversity Conservation (ICMBio). In the Cerrado biome, there are currently 241 federally managed conservation units, which amounts to 6,410,000 ha (64,100 km^{2}). Under state-level administration, the number of conservation units is currently 210, which make up 10,150,000 ha (101,500 km^{2}) of land. Municipal conservation units are managed by the municipal environmental secretariats. There are currently 109 conservation units managed at the municipal level in the Cerrado, spanning about 1,410,000 ha (14,100 km^{2}) of land.

Integral Protection Units in the Cerrado (as of 2024)
Type	IUCN Category	Purpose and Characteristics	No. of Units	Area	Examples
Ecological Station	Ia	Dedicated to scientific research and strict nature preservation; public visitation limited to educational purposes.	24	916.4 thousand ha	Serra Geral do Tocantins Ecological Station
Biological Reserve	Ia	Aims to preserve biodiversity; interventions allowed only for restoration; visitation limited to educational purposes.	6	8,196 ha	Culuene Biological Reserve
National Park (including State and Municipal Parks)	II	Protects ecologically significant ecosystems; allows recreation, education, and scientific research.	116	4.37 million ha	Araguaia National Park
Natural Monument	III	Preserves unique, rare, or scenic natural features; visitation allowed if aligned with conservation goals.	18	46 thousand ha	Tocantins Fossil Trees Natural Monument
Wildlife Refuge	III	Protects habitats for the reproduction and survival of local flora and fauna; visitation permitted for certain uses.	12	261 thousand ha	Corixão de Mata Azul Wildlife Refuge

Sustainable Use Protected Areas in the Cerrado (as of 2024)
Type	IUCN Category	Purpose and Characteristics	No. of Units	Area	Examples
Environmental Protection Area (APA)	V	Large areas with natural, aesthetic, and cultural value; aim to conserve biodiversity, guide human occupation, and promote sustainable use.	114	11.9 million ha	Baixada Maranhense Environmental Protection Area
Area of Relevant Ecological Interest (ARIE)	IV	Small areas with unique regional/local ecosystems; limited human occupation; may be public or private.	22	11.4 thousand ha	Cerrado Pé de Gigante ARIE
National Forests (Federal/State/Municipal)	VI	Native forests for sustainable resource use and scientific research; traditional populations may remain.	11	51.6 thousand ha	Cristópolis National Forest
Extractive Reserve	VI	Publicly owned; supports traditional populations using extractivism, small farming, and husbandry; allows research and visitation.	7	100 thousand ha	Chapada Limpa Extractive Reserve
Sustainable Development Reserve	VI	Inhabited by traditional populations using sustainable systems; supports cultural preservation, research, and visitation.	2	97.3 thousand ha	Nascentes Geraizeiras and Veredas do Acari SDRs

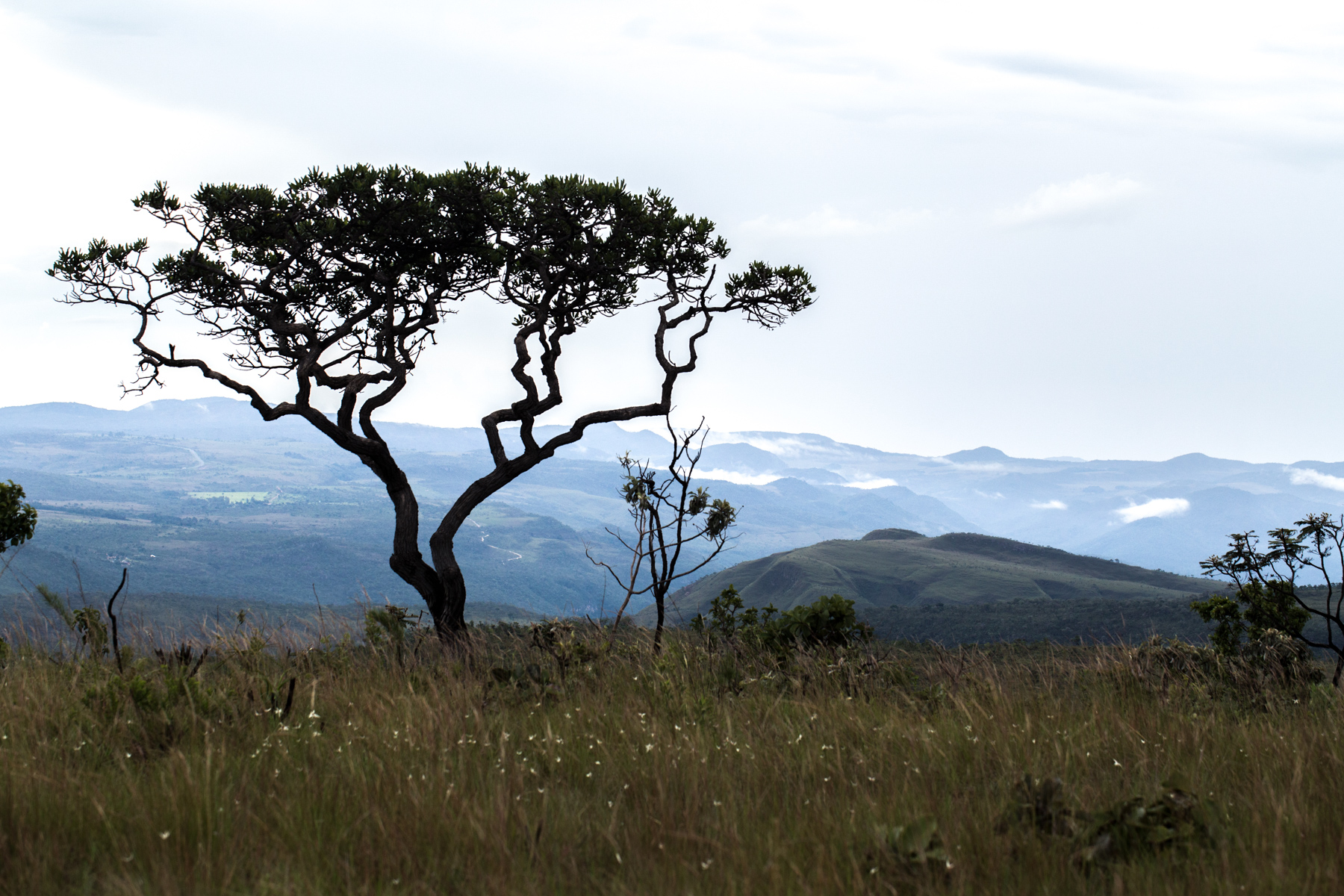
Chapada dos Veadeiros National Park - UNESCO World Heritage Site

==== UNESCO World Heritage Sites ====
Two conservation units in the Cerrado biome have been designated together as a UNESCO World Heritage Site: Chapada dos Veadeiros and Emas National Parks. Together they are known by UNESCO as the Cerrado Protected Areas, making up 38.14 kha of land. These conservation units were inscribed by UNESCO in 2001 for two main reasons. Firstly, the units are centrally localized and have varying altitudes, making them robust areas of refuge for species. Secondly, the units excellently represent the biodiversity of the Cerrado biome, with more than 60% of all plant species and almost 80% of all vertebrate species that exist in the region. Many endangered species occur in these units, making them important targets for conservation.

Both Chapada dos Veadeiros and Emas are National Parks that are federally managed. As National Parks, they are registered as integral protection units and benefit from strict regulations preventing the direct use of their resources. Chapada dos Veadeiros National Park was established in 1961 and comprises 240 kha of land. Its area overlaps with the Environmental Protection Area of Pouso Alto, which is a sustainable protection conservation unit that was established in 2001. Emas National Park was established in 1961, and it makes up 132 kha of land. Its management focuses on preventing the negative effects of the agricultural area that almost completely surrounds it.

==== Effectiveness of protected areas ====
Concerns have been raised about the effectiveness of protected areas in the Cerrado given the small proportion of land they cover and their varying degrees of strictness. Overlapping conservation units is an area of particular interest given the redundancy of the same area being protected and the possibility of management conflicts. In 2020, almost 40% of all conservation units in the Cerrado had some overlap with other units. A total of 64 conservation units were completely within other units. Most of these were areas of ecological interest within environmental protection areas, which are both sustainable protection units.

When they are created, each conservation unit in Brazil should be assigned a management plan which outlines the conservation practices that will take place within the unit as well as a management council to guide its conservation. The management plan establishes a number of guidelines and rules necessary for the management of the conservation unit. This includes the zoning of the area, in which the conservation unit is divided into different sections categorized by their required degrees of protection. The management council is responsible for monitoring the implementation of the management plan and acts as a link between local populations and stakeholders with economic or environmental priorities. As of 2024, almost 40% of all conservation units registered in the Cerrado do not have a management plan and about 60% do not have a management council.

Some studies have evaluated the effectiveness of protected areas in the Cerrado depending on their strictness. Sustainable protection units, which are less strict as biodiversity conservation is not their primary goal, have been found to be ineffective against deforestation. In 2015, 85% of all protected areas in the Cerrado, excluding private natural heritage reserves, were environmental protected areas, which are sustainable protection units. Integral protection units in the Cerrado are the most efficient in biodiversity protection in terms of reducing deforestation and maintaining species richness.

Conservation units should be representative of the biome they protect. In 2015, only two thirds of protected areas corresponded to remaining native vegetation in the Cerrado, with the other one third representing deforested areas within different conservation units. Despite this, protected areas have been found to be effective in representing both ecosystem services and biodiversity of the Cerrado.

By the end of 2025, despite the existence of 706 protected areas in the Cerrado, only about 8% of the biome is effectively protected, and most of these areas cover only a few hectares. Meanwhile, São Paulo, the country’s most economically important state, has very few protected areas, resulting in a current protection scenario that is clearly insufficient.

==== Privately owned land ====
Privately owned land is essential for conservation efforts as the majority of remaining native vegetation in the Cerrado occurs in private properties and farms. In 2019, private lands held 57.9% of the remaining native vegetation in the Cerrado. Brazil’s Forest Code requires land owners to retain 20% of native vegetation as Legal Reserves on their properties in all biomes except the Amazon, where the number is 80%. Legal Reserves in the Cerrado are essential for biodiversity protection, as about 13% of the distribution range of threatened species exist within them. Changes made to the Forest Code in 2012 legally allow almost 40 Mha of extra native vegetation to be cleared on top of the original allowance. In 2017, this amounted to 40% of remaining native vegetation in the biome legally able to be converted.

Compliance with the Forest Code by landowners is an issue in the Cerrado as some consider the legislation to be a roadblock for agricultural development. There are measures in place to increase compliance, such as the Rural Environmental Registry System (CAR), which is a documentation system of environmental information of millions of rural properties that facilitates their monitoring and management. Monetary incentives are also offered by the Brazilian government in the form of the Low-Carbon Agriculture (ABC) program to promote sustainable agriculture and forest restoration.

==== Indigenous land ====
Indigenous lands (IL) remain an important sector for biodiversity conservation in the Cerrado. The government of Brazil has recognized 4.8% of the Cerrado’s area as IL. In 2019, 6.72% of remaining native vegetation occurred within IL, compared to the 2.27% that was preserved within conservation units. Indigenous lands also effectively represent the ecosystem services and biodiversity characteristic of the Cerrado biome and are efficient in reducing habitat conversion and deforestation.
