= List of Atlantic Forest conservation units =

List of Atlantic Forest conservation units in Brazil

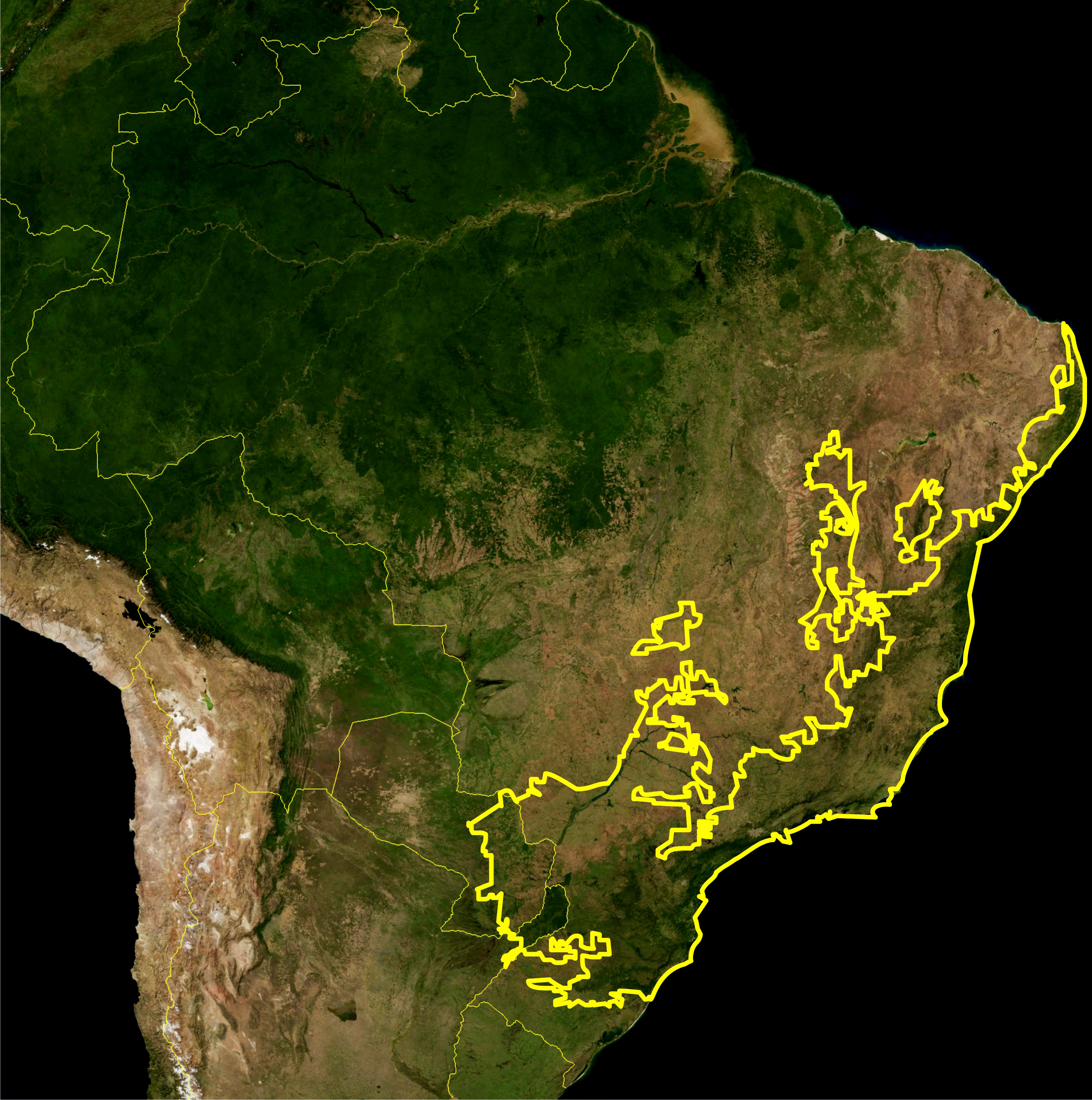
Location map of the Atlantic Forest biome.

There are 131 federal, 443 state, 14 municipal and 124 private conservation units in the Atlantic Forest area, spread over sixteen states in Brazil, with the exception of Goiás. Protected areas cover less than 2% of the biome and integral protection areas protect only 24% of the remnants. Many units consist of very small, isolated fragments and half of the threatened vertebrate species are not found in any protected area. Other related problems are the lack of infrastructure to maintain the conservation units and a series of impasses with indigenous leaders, as seen in the Ilha do Cardoso State Park, Superagüi National Park and Monte Pascoal National Park.

Among all the categories of conservation units in Brazil, Natural Heritage Reserves (RPPNs) are the most important for establishing new protected areas, as most of the remaining forest is still privately owned. In the Northeast, RPPNs protect important fragments with endemic and highly endangered species, especially birds. Another strategy for creating new units is the ICMS Ecológico, a tax compensation granted to municipalities and states that have officially declared protected areas.

In Argentina and Paraguay, there are important conservation units in the Alto Paraná Atlantic Forest ecoregion, which in Brazil are concentrated in the Iguaçu National Park, the Morro do Diabo State Park and the Turvo State Park. The protected areas in the Misiones Province, the Serra do Mar and southern Bahia comprise the largest continuous remnants of the Atlantic Forest. In order to maintain biodiversity and important ecological processes, it is proposed to create wildlife corridors linking the conservation units in each of these regions.

== National Parks ==
| Name | Image | Country | Date of creation | Area (ha) | Description |
|---|---|---|---|---|---|
| Alto Cariri | | Brazil | June 11, 2010 | 19.264 | Located in the south of Bahia, it preserves forest remnants of the Alto Cariri Mountain complex. It is the last place where the northern muriqui can be found in the state of Bahia. |
| Aparados da Serra | | Brazil | December 7, 1969 | 10.250 | Located between the states of Rio Grande do Sul and Santa Catarina, it preserves significant portions of the Araucaria Forest and the pampas. Its relief is notable for the presence of numerous gorges and canyons. |
| Araucárias | | Brazil | October 19, 2005 | 12.841 | It is one of the largest conservation units in the Araucaria Forest. |
| Caaguazú | | Paraguay | February 23, 1976 | 14.500 | Located in the Caaguazú Mountain Range, between the Paraguay and Paraná rivers, it is an important conservation unit of the Alto Paraná Atlantic Forest. |
| Caparaó | | Brazil | May 24, 1961 | 31.853 | Located between the states of Minas Gerais and Espírito Santo, it covers a large part of the Caparaó Mountains and is an important conservation unit of the Serra do Mar Forests in Espírito Santo. |
| Cerro Cora | | Paraguay | February 11, 1976 | 5.538 | Located in the Amambay Department, it is one of the largest stretches of Atlantic Forest in northeastern Paraguay. |
| Chapada Diamantina | | Brazil | September 17, 1985 | 152.000 | An important conservation unit due to its scenic beauty and for conserving elements of the transition between the Atlantic Forest and the Caatinga. |
| Descobrimento | | Brazil | April 20, 1999 | 22.693 | Along with other conservation units, it forms a combination of remnants of the Bahia Coastal Forests. A place of great biodiversity, with highly threatened species in the Atlantic Forest biome. |
| Iguaçu | | Brazil | January 10, 1939 | 185.263 | The largest conservation unit in western Paraná. It includes the Iguazu Falls and has great biodiversity. |
| Iguazu | | Argentina | October 9, 1934 | 67.698 | Located in the Misiones Province, it consists of the Argentine side of the Iguazu Falls. It is of great importance because it forms part of an ecological corridor of the Alto Paraná Forests in Argentina. |
| Ilha Grande | | Brazil | September 30, 1997 | 108.166 | Located between the states of Mato Grosso do Sul and Paraná, it preserves extensive floodplains of the Paraná River, as well as part of the only stretch of this river that has not yet been dammed in Brazil. |
| Itatiaia | | Brazil | June 14, 1937 | 30.000 | Located between the states of Minas Gerais and Rio de Janeiro, it preserves ecosystems related to the Serra do Mar Forests ecoregion. |
| Monte Pascoal | | Brazil | November 29, 1961 | 22.500 | It preserves remnants of the forests of southern Bahia. Monte Pascoal, the first elevation spotted by Pedro Álvares Cabral's squadron in 1500, is located in this park. |
| Ñacunday | | Paraguay | August 20, 1975 | 2.000 | An important Paraguayan conservation area on the banks of the Itaipu Dam. It includes the Ñacunday Falls, which has remarkable scenic beauty. |
| Pau Brasil | | Brazil | April 20, 1999 | 18.934 | Located in the municipality of Porto Seguro, it preserves important remnants of the forests of southern Bahia. It is one of the largest reservoirs of brazilwood and a UNESCO World Heritage Site. |
| Pontões Capixabas | | Brazil | December 19, 2002 | 17.496 | Located in the northwestern region of Espírito Santo, it has numerous mountain ranges that attract with their scenic beauty. Trekking, climbing and scenic flights are enjoyed by tourists and mountaineers alike. |
| Jurubatiba Sandbank | | Brazil | August 6, 2002 | 14.860 | It is the only conservation unit in Rio de Janeiro to preserve the restinga ecosystem. |
| Saint-Hilaire/Lange | | Brazil | May 23, 2001 | 25.119 | Located on the coast of Paraná, it is named after the French naturalist Augustin Saint-Hilaire and the Brazilian biologist Roberto Ribas Lange. |
| São Joaquim | | Brazil | July 6, 1961 | 49.800 | Located in Santa Catarina, it protects important forest remnants in the state. It has numerous mountain ranges due to its uneven terrain. |
| Serra da Bocaina | | Brazil | November 1, 1974 | 100.000 | Located between the states of Rio de Janeiro and São Paulo. Together with other conservation units, it forms the largest continuous stretch of Atlantic Forest in Brazil. It has a high degree of endemism and very endangered species, such as the jaguar. |
| Serra das Lontras | | Brazil | June 10, 2010 | 11.336 | Together with the Una Biological Reserve, it forms an important complex of forest remnants in the south of Bahia. It is home to primate species endemic to the Atlantic Forest and at risk of extinction, such as the golden-bellied capuchin and the golden-headed lion tamarin. |
| Serra do Itajaí | | Brazil | June 4, 2004 | 57.374 | One of the largest stretches of Atlantic Forest in Santa Catarina. |
| Serra dos Órgãos | | Brazil | November 30, 1939 | 20.024 | Located in the mountainous region of Rio de Janeiro, it has great scenic beauty and attractions for mountaineering. Together with other conservation units, it is the largest stretch of Atlantic Forest in the state, with critically endangered species such as the puma and the buffy-tufted marmoset. |
| Serra Geral | | Brazil | May 20, 1992 | 17.300 | Located in Rio Grande do Sul, it borders the Aparados da Serra National Park and forms an important complex of Atlantic Forest remnants in southern Brazil. |
| Superagüi | | Brazil | April 25, 1989 | 33.928 | Located on the coast of Paraná, it is one of the most important conservation units in the country, as it is the only place where the black-faced lion tamarin can be found. |
| Tijuca | | Brazil | July 6, 1961 | 3.958 | Located in Rio de Janeiro, it is considered the third largest urban forest in the world. One of Brazil's most important tourist attractions. |
| Ubajara | | Brazil | April 30, 1959 | 6.851 | Located in Ceará, it preserves important stretches of the Caatinga moist-forest enclaves. |
| Ybycui | | Paraguay | May 16, 1973 | 5.190 | Located in the Paraguarí Department, it preserves remnants of the Alto Paraná Forests in the Ybycuí Mountains. |

== Significant Integral Conservation Units ==
There are a large number of conservation units in the Atlantic Forest domain, most of them small and isolated. This section lists protected areas that play a fundamental function as "core zones" in important ecological corridors.

| Name | Image | Country | Type | Date of creation | Area (ha) | Description |
|---|---|---|---|---|---|---|
| Aguapeí | | Brazil | State Park | July 2, 1998 | 9.044 | Located in the interior of São Paulo, it preserves one of the last stretches of floodplain that existed on most of the tributaries of the Paraná River in the state. It is also one of the last places in São Paulo where the marsh deer occurs. |
| Alto Ribeira | | Brazil | State Park | May 19, 1958 | 35.884 | Along with other conservation units, it is one of the largest continuous stretches of the Brazilian Atlantic Forest. It is also notable for the high concentration of caves in its area. It is popularly known as PETAR. |
| Augusto Ruschi | | Brazil | Biological reserve | September 20, 1982 | 4.000 | Located in the state of Espírito Santo, it is an important fragment of Atlantic Forest that includes rare species such as the buffy-headed marmoset. It was created through the efforts of conservationist Augusto Ruschi, and its name is a posthumous tribute to him. |
| Cantareira | | Brazil | State Park | August 29, 1962 | 7.916,52 | Located in the North Zone of São Paulo, it is one of the largest urban forests in the world and preserves important remnants of São Paulo City Green Belt. |
| Carlos Botelho | | Brazil | State Park | September 10, 1982 | 37.644 | It is part of an important complex of conservation units in the southwest of São Paulo. Together with Intervales State Park and PETAR, it protects more than 1,000 square kilometers of forest. It is home to the largest population of the southern muriqui. |
| Desengano | | Brazil | State Park | April 13, 1970 | 22.400 | It is the largest remnant of forest in the north of Rio de Janeiro and includes the Pico do Desengano. Habitat of the northern muriqui, a critically endangered species endemic to the Atlantic Forest. |
| Feliciano Miguel Abdala | | Brazil | Private natural heritage reserve | September 4, 2001 | 957,58 | Located in the municipality of Caratinga, in Minas Gerais, it is one of the largest fragments of Atlantic Forest in the region and has the largest population of the northern muriqui, a primate species that has been studied there for over 30 years. |
| Guaraqueçaba | | Brazil | Ecological station | May 31, 1982 | 4.370 | Located in the municipality of Guaraqueçaba, it is part of a complex of conservation units on the coast of Paraná in one of the largest continuous stretches of Atlantic Forest in Brazil. |
| Ilha do Cardoso | | Brazil | State Park | July 3, 1962 | 22.500 | Significant for containing numerous endemic and highly threatened species in the Atlantic Forest biome and for the presence of many middens. |
| Itabó | | Paraguay | Biological Reserve | June 27, 1984 | 15.208 | Located in the Alto Paraná Department in Paraguay, it is an important conservation area on the banks of the Itaipu Dam. It is one of the last places where the jaguar still exists in eastern Paraguay. |
| Intervales | | Brazil | State Park | June 8, 1995 | 49.000 | Together with PETAR and Carlos Botelho State Park, it forms an important continuous stretch of Atlantic Forest. |
| Juréia-Itatins | | Brazil | Ecological station | January 20, 1986 | 84.425 | One of the most important conservation units on the São Paulo coast. It has numerous middens located within the ecological station. |
| Limoy | | Paraguay | Biological Reserve | 1984 | 23.730 | Another Paraguayan conservation unit created as a result of the construction of the Itaipu Dam. It consists of one of the largest fragments of Atlantic Forest on the banks of the Paraná River. |
| Mata Escura | | Brazil | Biological Reserve | June 5, 2003 | 50.890 | Located on the banks of the Jequitinhonha River, it is the largest forest fragment in the northeast of Minas Gerais. It includes rare species in the Atlantic Forest, such as the golden-bellied capuchin and the jaguar. |
| Mata da Estrela | | Brazil | Private natural heritage reserve | March 31, 2000 | 2.039,93 | The largest fragment of forest in Rio Grande do Norte, it features lagoons and deserted beaches. The blond capuchin and the red-handed howler can be found in the reserve. |
| Morro do Diabo | | Brazil | State Park | June 4, 1986 | 33.845 | It is the last large fragment of forest in Pontal do Paranapanema and the largest Aspidosperma polyneuron reserve in São Paulo. It has the biggest population of the black lion tamarin, a species endemic to the Alto Paraná Forests in the interior of São Paulo. |
| Pedra Talhada | | Brazil | Biological Reserve | December 13, 1989 | 4.469 | The largest fragment of the Pernambuco Interior Forests, between the states of Pernambuco and Alagoas. It is located in a transition area between the Caatinga and the Atlantic Forest and is an important center of bird endemism. |
| Perobas | | Brazil | Biological Reserve | March 20, 2006 | 8.716 | One of the largest forest fragments in the northwest of Paraná. It is home to an abundance of mammal species. |
| Poço das Antas | | Brazil | Biological Reserve | March 11, 1974 | 5.000 | Habitat of the golden lion tamarin, where numerous successful conservation programs have been implemented. It is currently considered a flagship species in the preservation of the Brazilian Atlantic Forest. |
| Restingas de Bertioga | | Brazil | State Park | December 10, 2010 | 9.312,32 | It preserves the remnants of restingas and mangroves on the coast of the state of São Paulo, in the city of Bertioga. An important ecological corridor between coastal ecosystems and the Serra do Mar; crucial for maintaining the ecological processes of the coastal plain. |
| Rio Doce | | Brazil | State Park | July 14, 1944 | 35.974 | The largest forest fragment in the east of Minas Gerais, it is very important in the conservation of Bahia Interior Forests. It is a habitat for the northern muriqui. |
| Saltinho | | Brazil | Biological Reserve | September 21, 1983 | 548 | Despite its small size, it is an important fragment of Pernambuco's Coastal Forests. Located in the municipality of Tamandaré, it is home to very rare species of birds, such as the seven-colored tanager. |
| Serra do Mar | | Brazil | State Park | April 10, 2004 | 315.391 | Located on the escarpments of the Serra do Mar in São Paulo, it is the largest continuous stretch of Atlantic Forest. |
| Sooretama | | Brazil | Biological Reserve | September 20, 1982 | 24.000 | Together with the Linhares Reserve, it is the largest complex of forest in the state of Espírito Santo. It is one of the last stretches of Mata de Tabuleiros, which is very similar to the Amazon rainforest. |
| Três Picos | | Brazil | State Park | June 6, 2002 | 46.350 | It is the largest state park of Rio de Janeiro. Together with other conservation units, forms an important ecosystem of remnants of the Serra do Mar Forests. |
| Turvo | | Brazil | State Park | March 11, 1947 | 17.491 | Located on the banks of the Uruguay River in Rio Grande do Sul, it borders the Moconá Provincial Park in Argentina. It has the Yucumã Falls and is the last place in the state of Rio Grande do Sul where the jaguar still exists. |
| União | | Brazil | Biological Reserve | April 22, 1998 | 7.756 | An important conservation unit in Rio de Janeiro. Along with the Poço das Antas Biological Reserve, it is essential for the preservation and reproduction of the golden lion tamarin. |
| Una | | Brazil | Biological Reserve | December 10, 1980 | 18.500 | Conservation unit in the south of Bahia. It is one of the last places where the golden-headed lion tamarin and the golden-bellied capuchin can be found. |
| Urugua-í | | Argentina | Provincial Park | October 5, 1990 | 84.000 | It is part of the Green Corridor in the Misiones Province in Argentina, and is one of the largest continuous stretches of the Alto Paraná Forests. |

== Biosphere Reserves ==
The Biosphere Reserve is a collection of conservation units established by UNESCO with the aim of promoting more regional actions in the conservation of the different biomes around the world. There are four reserves in the Atlantic Forest domain spread over Brazil, Argentina and Paraguay.

| Name | Image | Country | Date of creation | Area (ha) | Description |
|---|---|---|---|---|---|
| São Paulo City Green Belt | | Brazil | June 9, 1994 | 2.400, 682 | It is an integral part of the Atlantic Forest Biosphere Reserve and covers 73 municipalities in the state of São Paulo. It is an important complex of state and federal protected areas as it is the largest continuous stretch of Atlantic Forest in Brazil. |
| Atlantic Forest | | Brazil | 1993 | 1.480.000 | In terms of forested area, it is the largest Biosphere Reserve in the world with around 700 integral conservation units as "core zones". It includes the São Paulo City Green Belt Biosphere Reserve. |
| Mbaracayú | | Paraguay | 2000 | 300.000 | Paraguay's first Biosphere Reserve; it consists of private conservation units forming one of the largest remaining areas of the Alto Paraná Forests. |
| Yabotí | | Argentina | 1995 | 250.000 | It comprises one of the largest stretches of forest in Argentina and the entire Atlantic Forest domain. It is home to two important conservation units: the Esmeralda Reserve and the Moconá Provincial Park. |

== See also ==
- Biological reserve
- National park
- National System of Nature Conservation Units
- List of state parks in São Paulo
