= Wildlife reserve (Brazil) =

Sustainable use protected area in Brazil

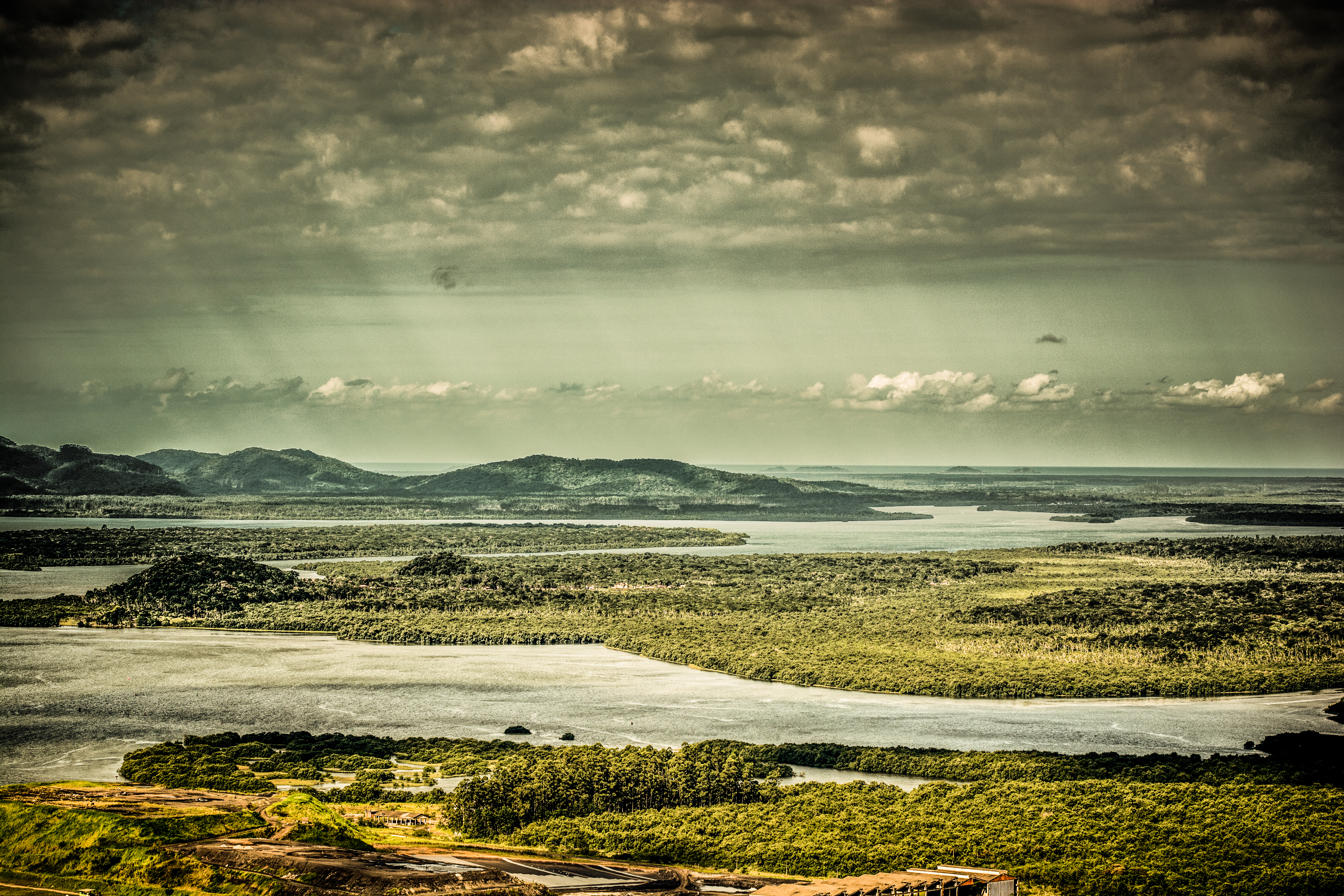
Baía da Babitonga. A wildlife reserve was planned here, but abandoned.

A wildlife reserve (Portuguese: Reserva de fauna – Refau) is a type of sustainable use protected area of Brazil. As of 2016 no conservation units had been created in this category.

== Definition ==
The concept of a wildlife reserve was spelled out in Law No. 9.985 of 18 July 2000, which established the National System of Nature Conservation Units (SNUC). It is a natural area with populations of native species of fauna, terrestrial and aquatic, resident or migratory, suitable for technical and scientific studies of sustainable economic management of wildlife resources. The public may visit the reserve if that is compatible with managing the conservation unit. Hunting is not allowed. However, products and by-products that result from the research may be marketed subject to laws concerning fauna. The area of the reserve is in the public domain, and land within its boundaries may be expropriated.

Federal reserves are administered by the Chico Mendes Institute for Biodiversity Conservation. Other reserves are administered by the state or municipal environmental agency. As of 2016 Chico Mendes Institute had not created any wildlife reserves.

== Examples ==
Name	State	Created	Area (ha)	Biome
Baía da Babitonga	Santa Catarina	2007		Coastal marine

== Sources ==
- Áreas protegidas (in Portuguese), Apremavi - Associação de Preservação do Meio Ambiente e da Vida
- Categorias (in Portuguese), Chico Mendes Institute for Biodiversity Conservation, archived from the original on 2016-07-13
- "O que é uma Reserva de Fauna", ((o))eco (in Portuguese), 22 July 2015
