= Baía da Babitonga Wildlife Reserve =

Wildlife reserve in Brazil

- Reserva de Fauna da Baía da Babitonga
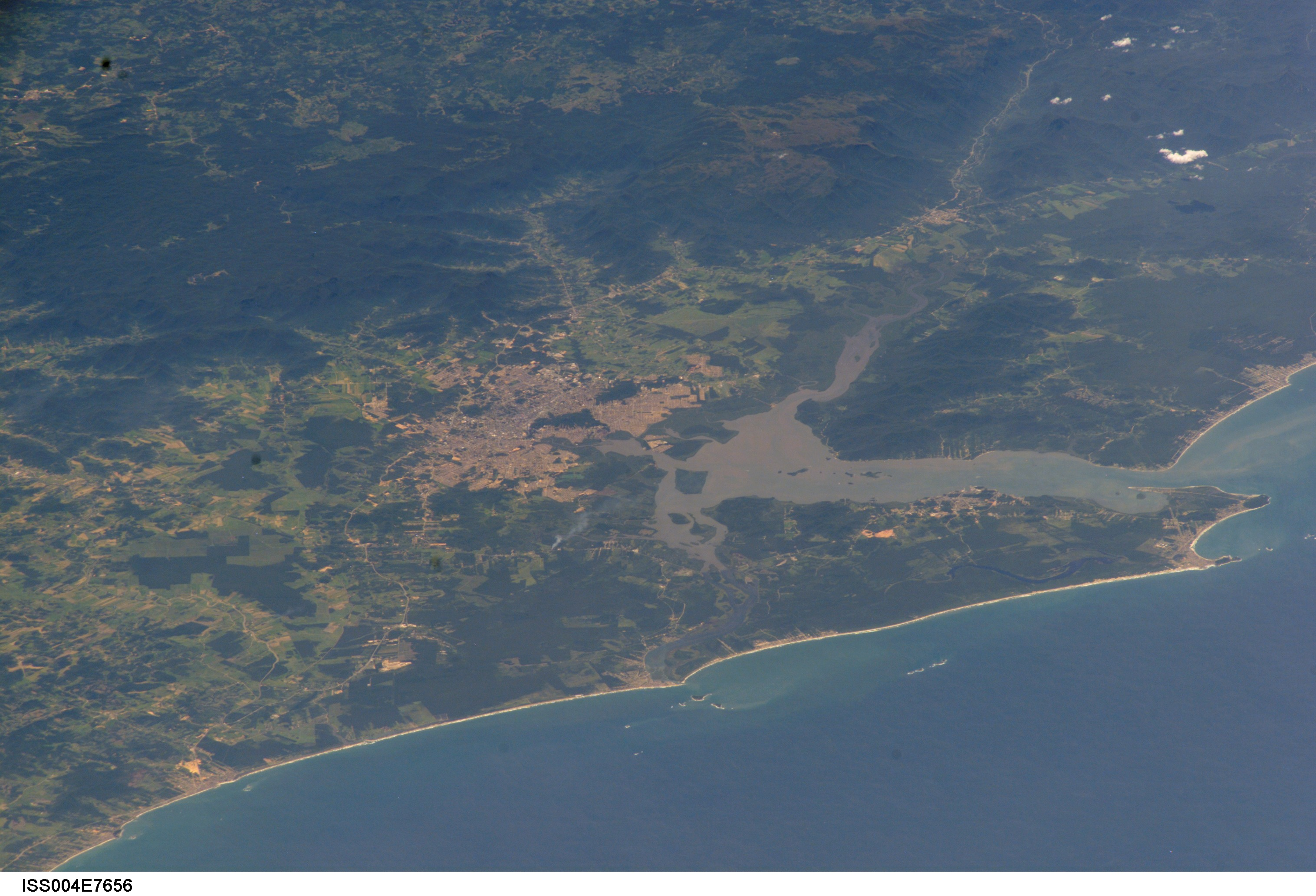
- Satellite view of Joinville (centre) and the bay leading to the ocean

- Location within Brazil
- Nearest city: Joinville, Santa Catarina
- Coordinates: 26.268°S 48.691°W
- Designation: Wildlife reserve

Baía da Babitonga Wildlife Reserve (Portuguese: Reserva de Fauna da Baía da Babitonga) was a proposed wildlife reserve in the state of Santa Catarina, Brazil. The purpose was to research methods of improving sustainable fishing and aquaculture of oysters and mussels; however, the bay is home to a major industrial park and port. The project encountered resistance from local politicians and business leaders and was shelved.

== Location ==
Babitonga Bay is located on the north coast of Santa Catarina and covers a total area of 130 square kilometres (50 sq mi). Its surroundings include the cities of Joinville and São Francisco do Sul. The shores are populated with typical native mangroves, and constitute 75% of the mangroves in the state with an area of about 6,200 hectares (15,000 acres). The bay also has sandy beaches, rocky shores, about 24 islands and tidal flats. The bay is important for its biodiversity and as the most southern of Brazil's remaining mangrove forests. In 2003 the Ministry of the Environment classified it as an area of extreme biological importance.

In 2007 the Chico Mendes Institute for Biodiversity Conservation (ICMBio) estimated that over 2,000 families of fisherfolk used the natural resources in the proposed reserve area for their livelihood. Aquatic farms cultivated mussels and oysters in the bay, and tourism was expanding. Endangered species such as the Guiana dolphin (Sotalia guianensis), La Plata dolphin (Pontoporia blainvillei) and Atlantic goliath grouper (Epinephelus itajara) depended on the environmental quality of the bay. There were 6,200 hectares (15,000 acres) of mangroves in the area, the sole habitat of the over-exploited Uçá (Ucides cordatus) species of mangrove crab.

The Bay of Babitonga is also an important harbour and the region holds the state's largest industrial park, which depends on use of the port facilities. The area has been degraded by human occupation over the years. The water has been polluted by human and industrial waste water, siltation due to deforestation, unsustainable fishing and hunting, landfill in the mangroves and other activities. By 2007 the shrimp harvest had dropped drastically from earlier years.

== Proposal ==
On 18 November 2006 the Brazilian Institute of Environment and Renewable Natural Resources (IBAMA) announced that it was studying creation of the Bay of Babitonga Wildlife Reserve, and that public consultations would be held in local communities. The proposed sustainable conservation unit would promote harmonious integration of productive activity in the region with conservation of nature, particularly of land crab, grouper, sea bass, gray dolphin and porpoise. This would be the first wildlife reserve to be created in Brazil. The purpose was to promote research that would benefit fishing and shellfish cultivation in the bay. Activities such as fishing, swimming and sightseeing would be regulated to avoid exceeding the capacity of the environment. The reserve would cover the mangroves and deep water. It would not have direct control over dumping of domestic and industrial sewage, but could help find funding for sewage works.

== Resistance ==
Seven public consultations were held in communities around the bay in 2006 and 2007, and another was scheduled by ICMBio with IBAMA in São Francisco do Sul on 2 October 2007. After the first public hearing a group of politicians and businesspeople raised the alarm, since the proposal threatened planned projects and privatization of large areas of mangroves. At the 29–30 November 2006 meeting of the National Council of the Environment Sergio Silva of the State of Santa Catarina called for a motion to expand public discussion. Expansion of the port facilities was going through the environmental review process. The consultation process had not been widely publicized in the media.

The public meetings were often tense, since many people were against the reserve due to lack of information. The Business Association of Joinville (ACIJ) took a stand against Ibama, saying there was already sufficient protection of the mangroves and surrounding forests, and treatment of effluents was sufficient. A delegation led by Governor Luiz Henrique da Silveira met with president Luiz Inácio Lula da Silva (Lula) in Brasilia. Lula told the Minister of the Environment Marina Silva to cancel the plan. An injunction was filed in court by trade and industry NGOs to prevent any further action. As of 2016 Chico Mendes Institute had still not created any wildlife reserves.

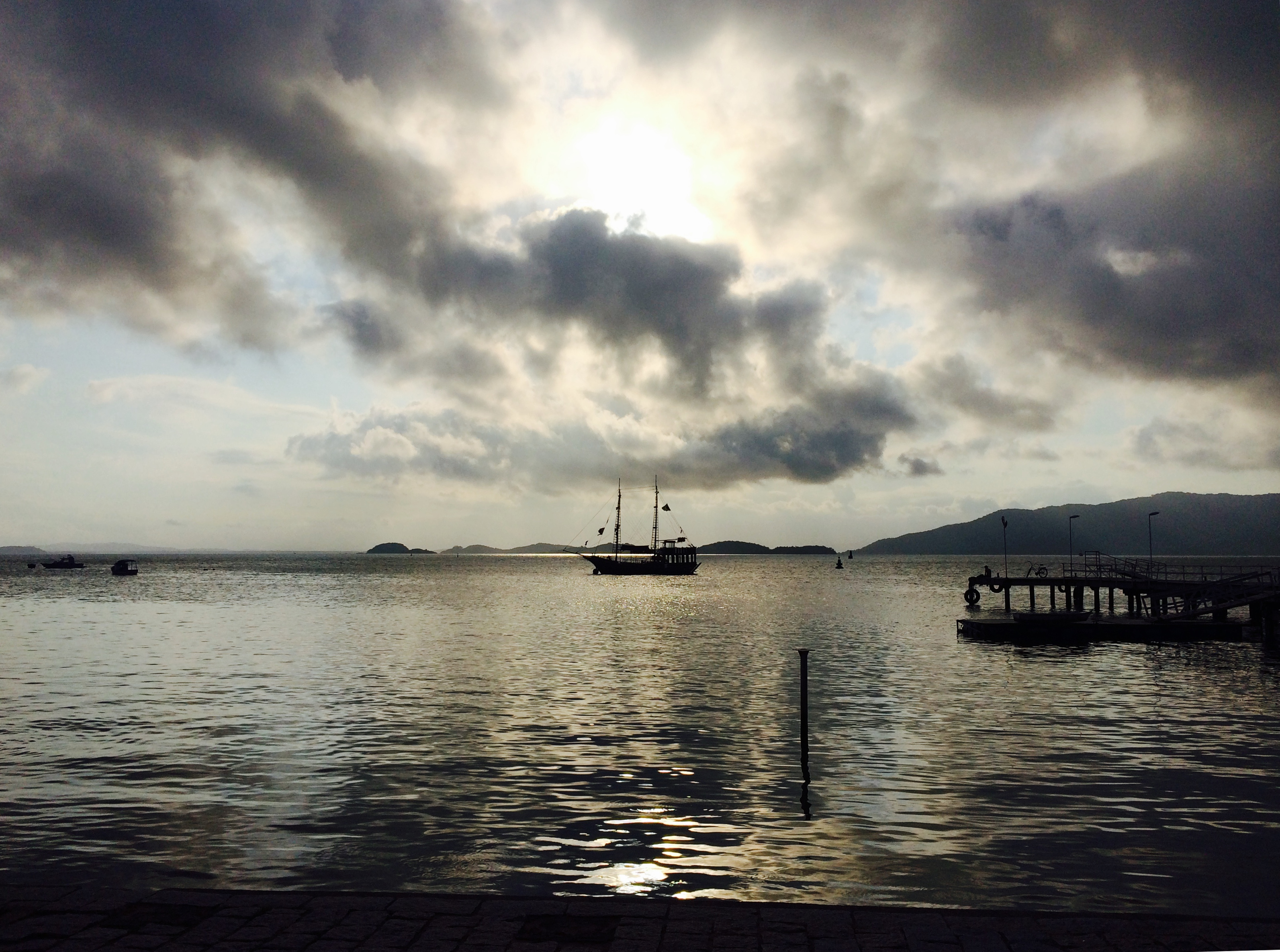
View from São Francisco do Sul

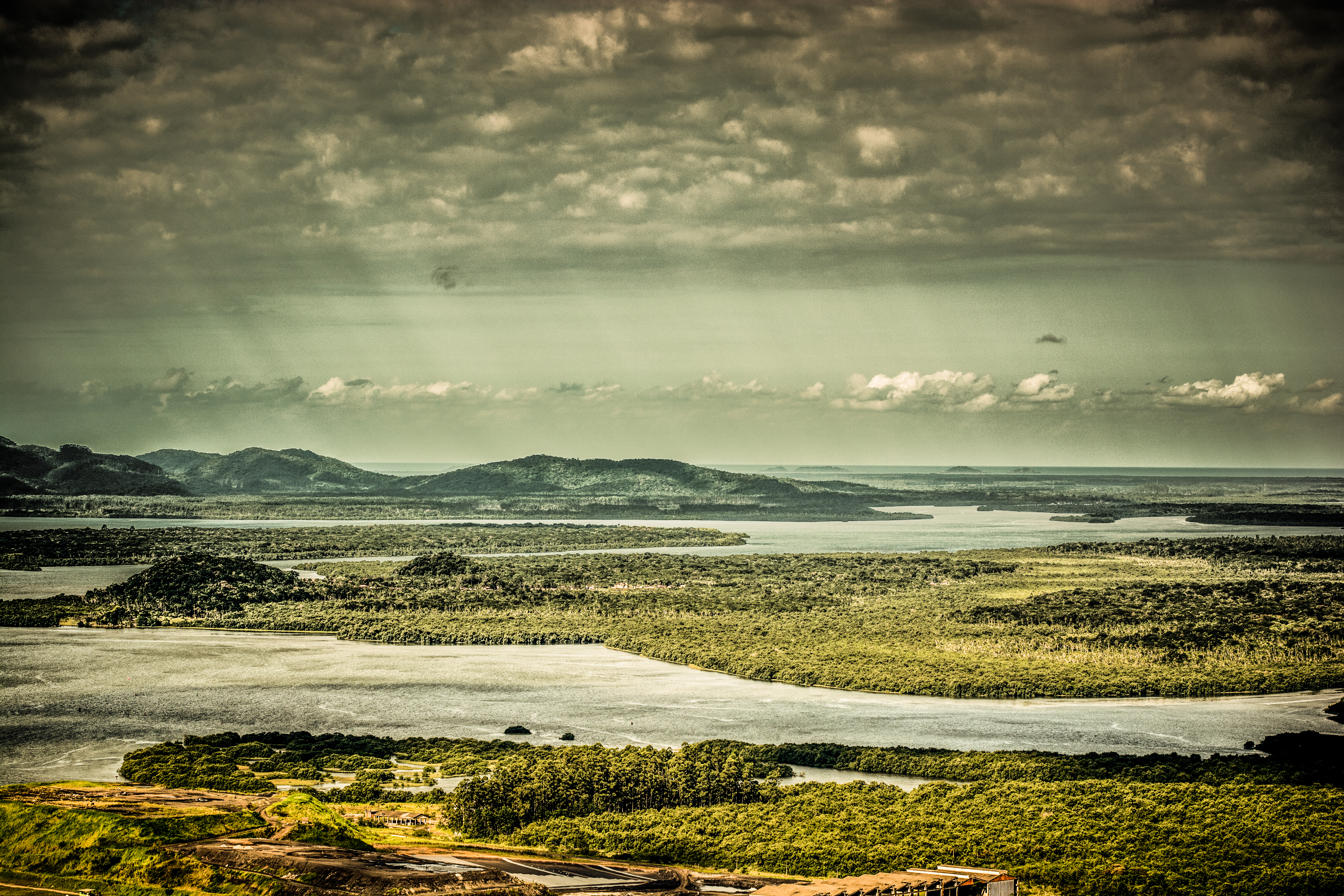
View from Boa Vista hill in Joinville

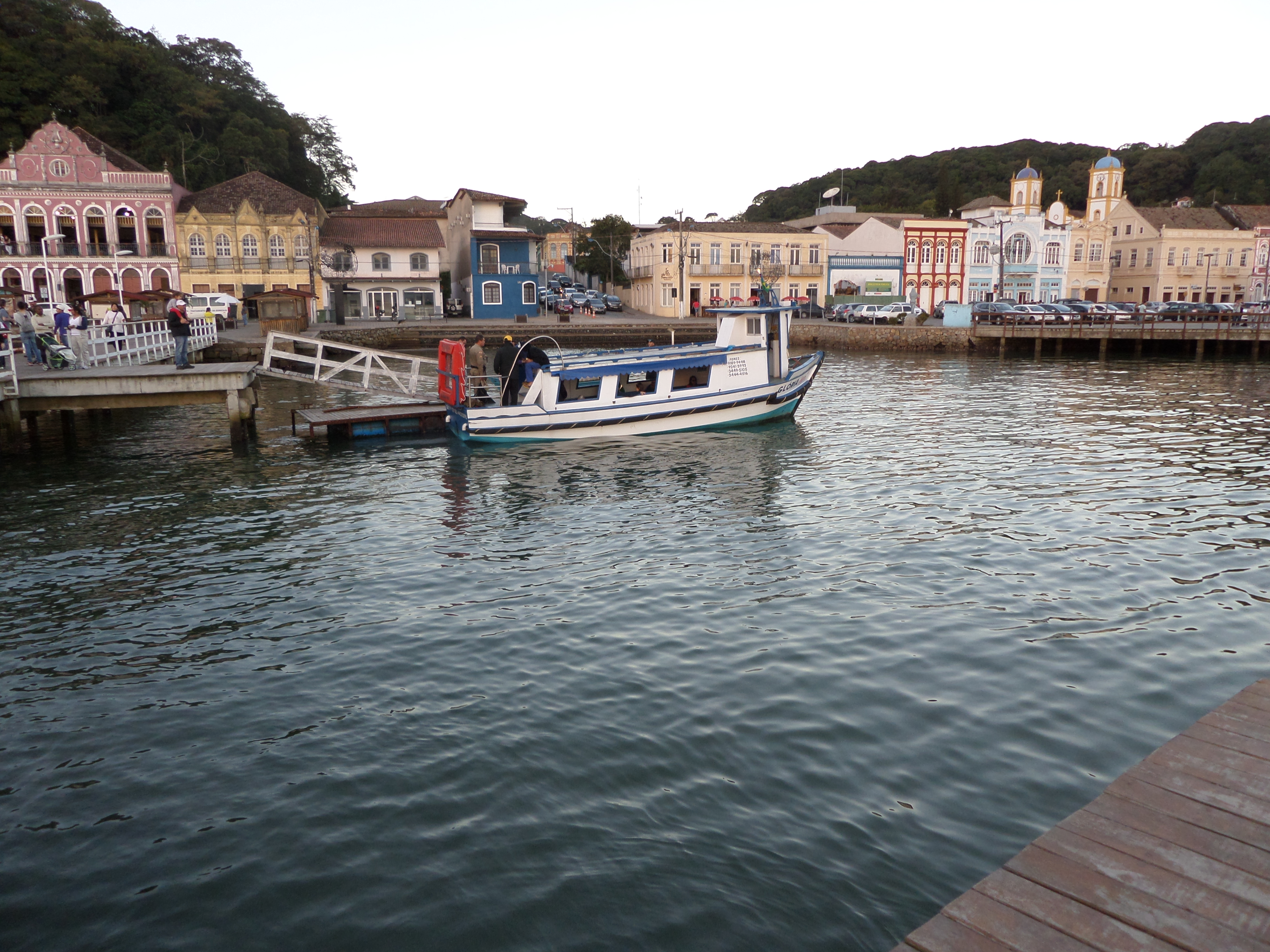
São Francisco do Sul

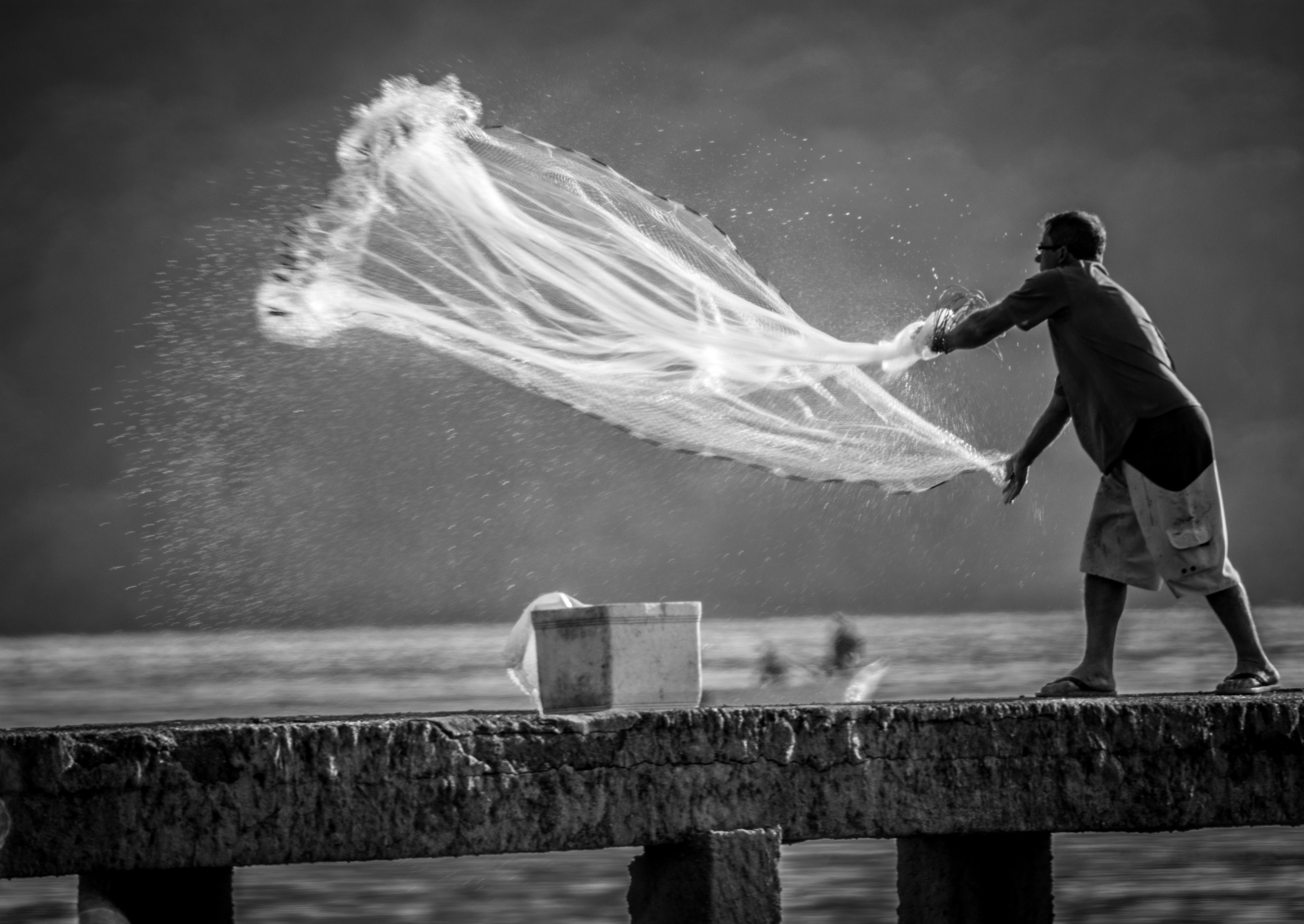
Fisherman throwing a net

== Sources ==
- Categorias (in Portuguese), Chico Mendes Institute for Biodiversity Conservation, archived from the original on 2016-07-13
- Eunice Venturi (22 May 2007), "Baía da Babitonga pode virar a primeira reserva de fauna federal do país", EcoViagem
- Gert Roland Fischer (22 June 2012), "UC – unidade de conservação de fauna", Ecologia em Ação (in Portuguese)
- Glauber Peixoto (7 November 2011), "Baía da Babitonga, primeira Reserva de Fauna brasileira", Jornalismo Ambiental Unifor
- Miriam Prochnow (18 November 2006), Reserva de Fauna Baia da Babitonga, Ibama, archived from the original on 18 September 2016
- Sandra Tavares (18 September 2007), Instituto Chico Mendes e Ibama realizam Consulta Pública para a criação da primeira Reserva de Fauna do País, na baía da Babitonga-SC, Brasília: ICMBio, archived from the original on 30 May 2016
- Sergio Silva (2006), PROPOSTA DE MOÇÃO (PDF)
- Torres Rodrigues, Ana Maria; Bertoncini Andrade, Athila; Carvalho Ferreira, Emanuel; Gonchorosky, Julio; Gerhardinger, Leopoldo; Karam e Britto, Mariana de; Cremer, Marta J.; Hostim, Mauricio (February 2005), Reserva da Babitonga (PDF), IBAMA
