= Protected areas of Brazil =

Various classes of area according to the National System of Conservation Units

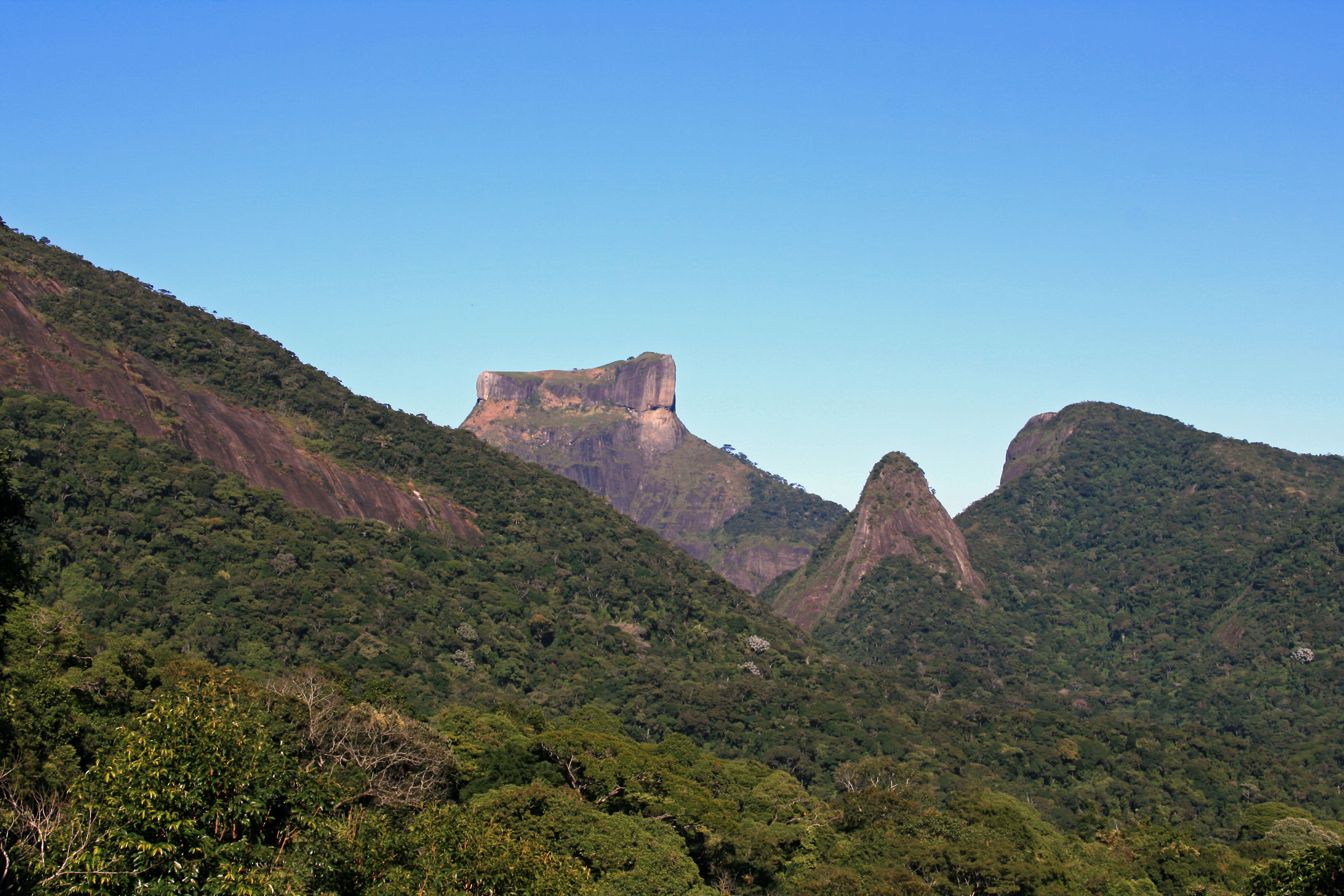
Tijuca Forest National Park

Protected areas of Brazil included various classes of area according to the National System of Nature Conservation Units (SNUC), a formal, unified system for federal, state and municipal parks created in 2000.

== Types of protected area ==
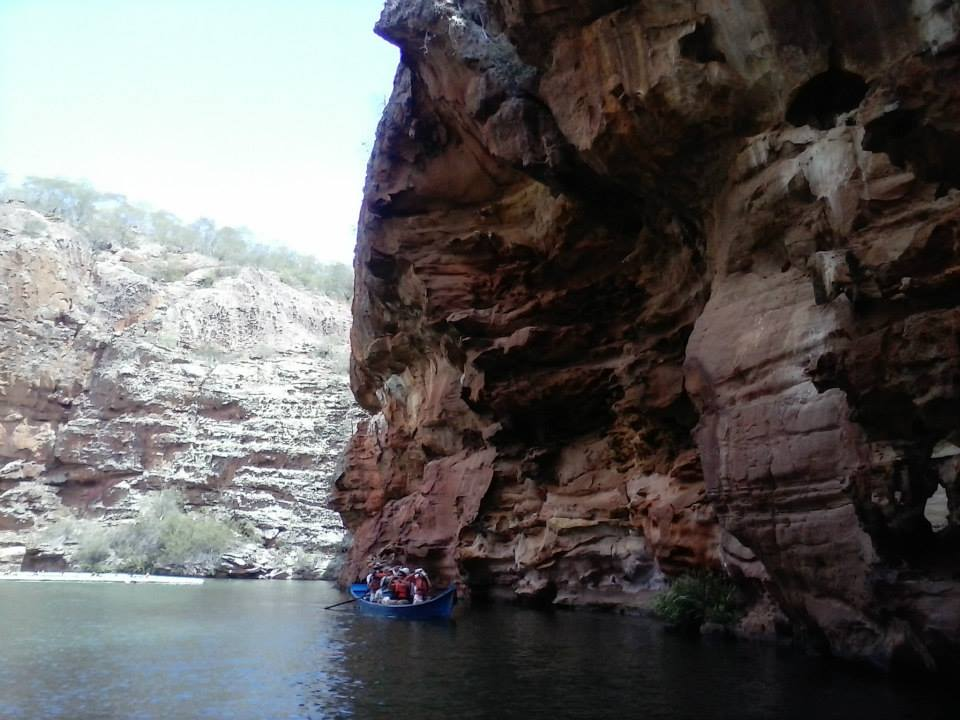
Canyon in the Rio São Francisco Natural Monument

Protected areas, also called conservation units, are divided into different categories according to their goals. These are defined by Law No. 9.985 of 18 July 2000, which established the National System of Nature Conservation Units (SNUC). Objectives include conservation of nature, sustainable development, scientific research, education and eco-tourism. Fully protected units are expected to maintain the natural ecosystem without human interference. Sustainable use units allow sustained use of renewable environmental resources while maintaining biodiversity and other ecological attributes. The Chico Mendes Institute for Biodiversity Conservation, which administers Federal units, defines the fully protected (proteção integral) classes of unit as:

- Ecological stations (Portuguese: Estações Ecológicas)
- Biological reserves (Portuguese: Reservas Biológicas)
- National parks (Portuguese: Parques nacionais), State parks (Portuguese: Parques estaduais) and Municipal nature parks (Portuguese: Parques naturais municipais)
- Natural monuments (Portuguese: Monumentos Naturais)
- Wildlife refuges (Portuguese: Refúgios de Vida Silvestre)

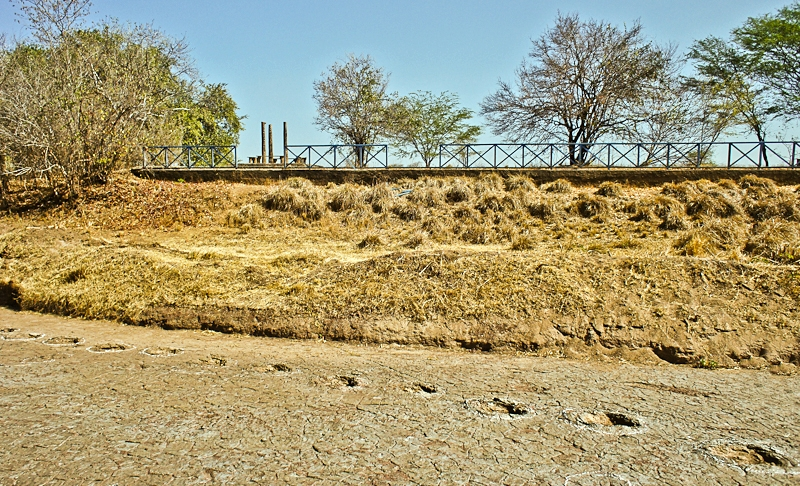
Fossilised tracks in the Valley of the Dinosaurs, Paraíba

The sustainable use units are:

- Environmental protection areas (Portuguese: Áreas de Proteção Ambiental)
- Areas of relevant ecological interest (Portuguese: Áreas de Relevante Interesse Ecológico)
- National forests (Portuguese: Florestas Nacionais) and State forests (Portuguese: Florestas Estaduais)
- Extractive reserves (Portuguese: Reservas Extrativistas)
- Wildlife reserves (Portuguese: Reservas de Fauna)
- Sustainable development reserves (Portuguese: Reservas de Desenvolvimento Sustentável)
- Private natural heritage reserves (Portuguese: Reservas Particular do Patrimônio Natural)

In addition, some states designate areas as ecological reserve (Portuguese: Reserva Ecológica).

Although not technically protected areas, indigenous territories (Portuguese: Terras Indígenas) give the indigenous people full rights over the area, and serve as an obstacle to deforestation, mining and large-scale agriculture. As of 2016 there were 700 Indigenous Territories in Brazil, covering about 13.8% of the country's land area. Most of them were in the Amazon Legal.

== Mosaics and corridors ==
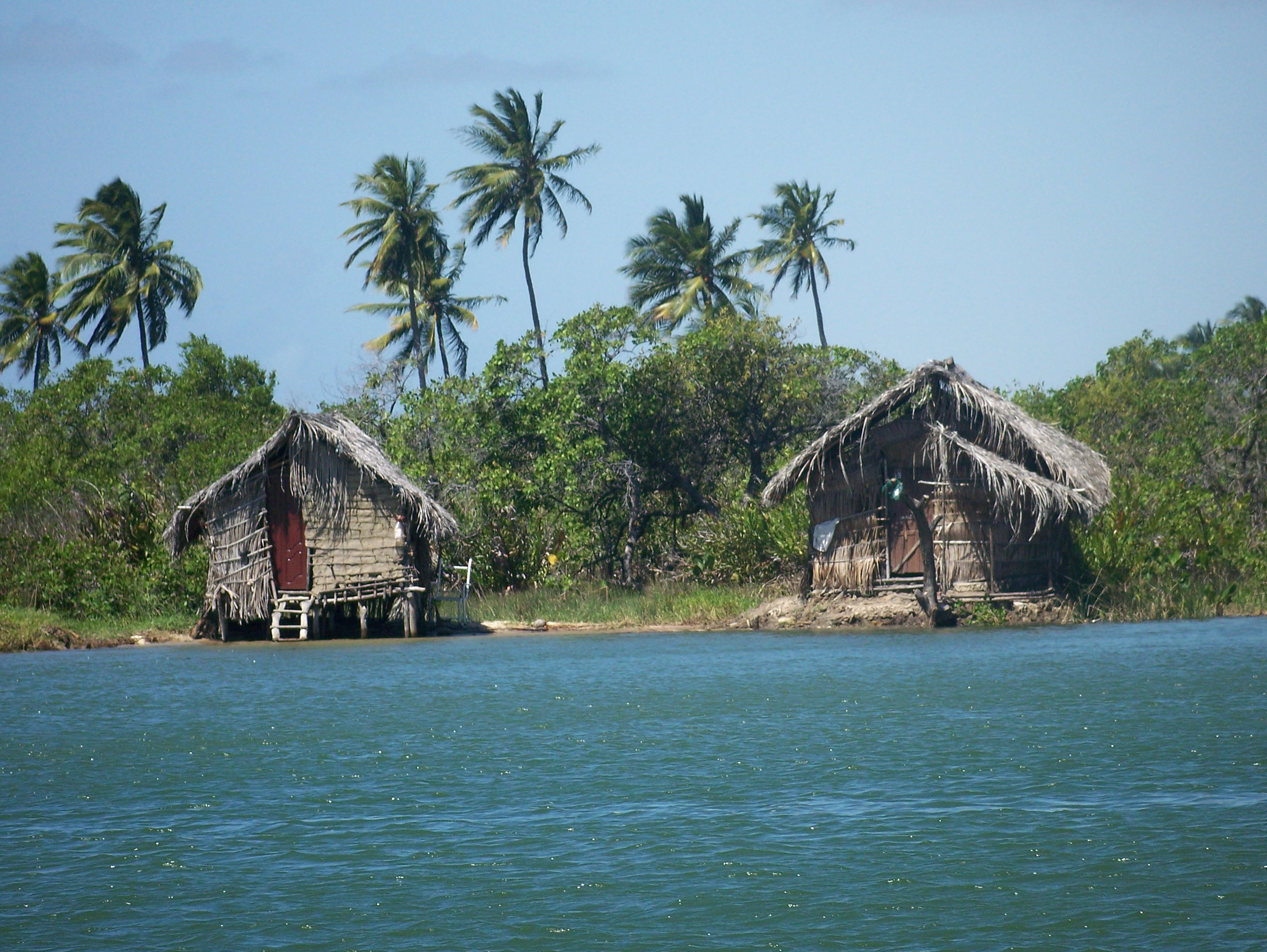
Fishing houses in the Piaçabuçu Environmental Protection Area

The SNUC law defines a protected area mosaic as a collection of protected areas of the same or different categories that are near to each other, adjoining each other or overlapping, and that should be managed as a whole. Given the different categories of conservation unit and other protected areas in a mosaic, the different conservation goals must be considered. In addition to fully protected and sustainable use conservation units a mosaic may include private lands and indigenous territories.

The SNUC law also recognises ecological corridors as portions of natural or semi-natural ecosystems linking protected areas that allow gene flow and movement of biota, recolonization of degraded areas and maintenance of viable populations larger than would be possible with individual units. The federal Ecological Corridor Project has its roots at least as far back as 1993. It has identified seven major corridors, with focus on implementing and learning from the Central Amazon Corridor and the Central Atlantic Forest Corridor.

== Degree of coverage ==
As of 2004 federally-administered conservation units covered 7.23% of Brazilian territory, below the level of 10% recommended by the International Union for Conservation of Nature. Federal coverage was:

Type	Protected area (ha)	Total area (ha)	Percentage Protected
Fully protected	28,147,214.93	854,546,635.67	3.29%
Sustainable use	33,663,938.75	854,546,635.67	3.94%
totals	61,811,153.68	854,546,635.67	7.23%

Levels of protection vary considerably depending on the biome. Federal coverage as of 2005 was:

Biome	Total area (km^{2})	Percentage Protected
Amazon	4,239,000	13.40%
Cerrado	2,116,000	4.10%
Atlantic Forest	1,076,000	2.01%
Pantanal	142,500	1.10%
Caatinga	736,800	0.91%

Protected areas are subject to reduction, reclassification or declassification (RRD). Between 1981 and 2010 an area of 45,000,000 hectares (110,000,000 acres) was downgraded or lost in this way, with almost 70% of cases occurring since 2008. The main cause was making land available for hydroelectric dams in the Amazon region. Other reasons were property speculation and agribusiness.

== See also ==
- List of ecoregions in Brazil
- List of Atlantic Forest conservation units
- List of state parks in São Paulo

== Sources ==
- Áreas protegidas (in Portuguese), Apremavi - Associação de Preservação do Meio Ambiente e da Vida, archived from the original on 2016-05-02
- Barbosa Monteiro, Claudio Henrique; Soares do Prado, Bárbara Heliodora; Dias, Antonio Cecílio (February 2009), Plano De Manejo Estação Ecológica De Angatuba (PDF) (in Portuguese), São Paulo – Brasil: Floresta Estadual & Estação Ecológgica de Angatuba
- Bruno Deiro; Herton Escobar (19 December 2012), Brasil perdeu um RJ de áreas protegidas (in Portuguese), Universidade Federal de Pernambuco
- Categorias (in Portuguese), Chico Mendes Institute for Biodiversity Conservation
- Corredor ecológico (in Portuguese), ISA: Instituto Socioambiental
- "Indigenous Lands – Location and extension", Povos Indígenas no Brasil, ISA: Instituto Socioambiental
- Mosaicos de áreas protegidas (in Portuguese), ISA: Instituto Socioambiental, archived from the original on 2016-06-20
