= National System of Nature Conservation Units =

Brazilian nature conservation guidelines

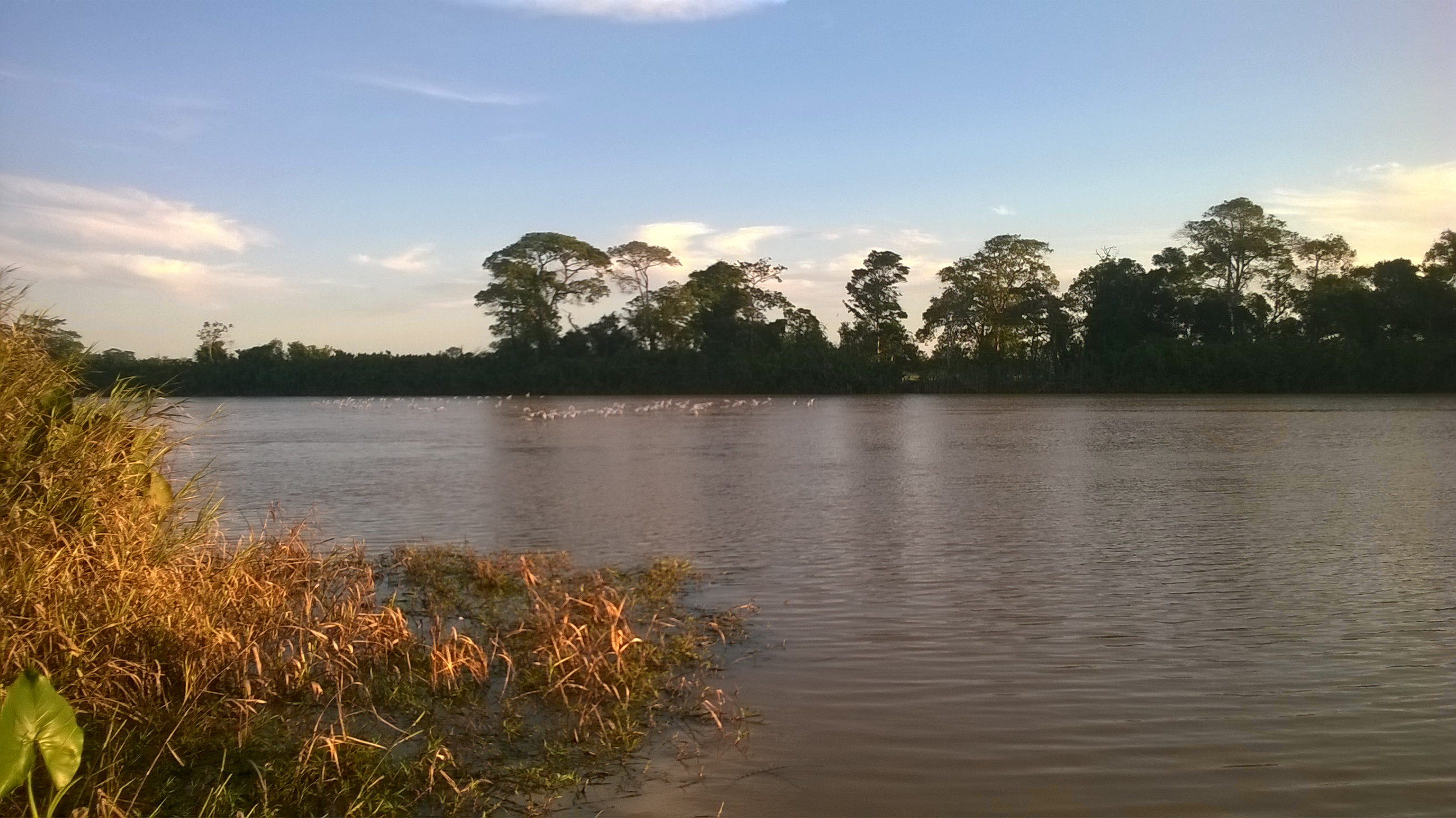
Conceição da Barra Environmental Protection Area.

The National System of Nature Conservation Units (Portuguese: Sistema Nacional de Unidades de Conservação da Natureza), abbreviated SNUC, is a set of regulations and official procedures that enable the federal, state and municipal government departments, as well as private initiative, to create, implement and manage Conservation Units (UC) in order to organize nature preservation in Brazil.

== History ==
The SNUC originated in the 1970s, when the former Brazilian Forestry Development Institute - IBDF (Portuguese: Instituto Brasileiro de Desenvolvimento Florestal), supported by the Brazilian Foundation for Nature Conservation (Fundação Brasileira para a Conservação da Natureza), created the Plan for the System of Conservation Units in Brazil (Plano do Sistema de Unidades de Conservação do Brasil), officially published in 1979. The project contained specific objectives necessary for nature conservation in Brazil and proposed new categories of natural resource management, which were not provided for in the legislation of the time - the Brazilian Forest Code of 1965 and the Fauna Protection Act of 1967. A second stage of the plan, drawn up by the IBDF, was sanctioned by the government in 1982 and published under its current name and acronyms - the National System of Nature Conservation Units (SNUC).

In order to provide legal support for the system, it became necessary to create a law that incorporated the concepts defined for the categorization and establishment of conservation units in Brazil. In July 1988, the Pro-Nature Foundation - FUNATRA (Portuguese: Fundação Pró-Natureza), with resources initially provided by the Special Secretariat for the Environment - SEMA (Secretaria Especial do Meio Ambiente) and the IBDF, gathered a group of specialists to review and update the definitions of the categories of conservation units and to develop a draft law. In 1989, the work concluded and resulted in two draft laws published by IBAMA and FUNATRA.

The texts were discussed in both the executive and legislative branches. After undergoing considerable changes, they were published in the form of Law No. 9.985, of July 18, 2000. Decree No. 4.340, of August 22, 2002, regulates the SNUC.

== Objectives ==
The SNUC promotes nature conservation in Brazil by providing legal mechanisms to the federal, state and municipal governments and to private initiative in order to:

- contribute to the maintenance of biological diversity and genetic resources in the national territory and jurisdictional waters;
- protect endangered species at regional and national level;
- contribute to the preservation and restoration of the diversity of natural ecosystems;
- promote sustainable development based on natural resources;
- promote the use of nature conservation principles and practices in the development process;
- protect natural and little altered landscapes of outstanding beauty;
- protect geological, geomorphological, speleological, paleontological and cultural features;
- protect and restore water and soil resources;
- recover or restore degraded ecosystems;
- provide means and incentives for scientific research activities, studies and environmental monitoring;
- enhance the economic and social value of biological diversity;
- favor conditions and promote environmental education and interpretation, recreation in contact with nature and ecological tourism;
- protect the natural resources necessary for the subsistence of traditional populations, respecting and valuing their knowledge and culture and promoting them socially and economically.

== Conservation Unit ==
The SNUC uses the name Conservation Unit (UC in Portuguese) to describe protected areas, which are territorial spaces, including jurisdictional waters, with relevant natural characteristics and defined conservation objectives and boundaries. The SNUC provides legal mechanisms for the creation and management of protected areas in the three levels of administration and private initiative, enabling the development of collective strategies for the preservation of natural areas. The involvement of society in the management of Conservation Units is also regulated by the system, which strengthens the connection between the state, citizens and the environment. The federal government's Conservation Units are managed by the Chico Mendes Institute for Biodiversity Conservation (ICMBio in Portuguese).

The SNUC provides for twelve complementary categories of conservation units organized according to their management objectives and types of use in two large groups:

- Full Protection Units: their basic objective is the preservation of nature; they allow indirect use of their natural resources, with the exception of the cases provided for in the SNUC Law;
- Sustainable Use Units: aim to harmonize nature conservation with the direct use of part of its natural resources, while maintaining the biodiversity of the site and its renewable resources.

The following table presents an overview of the categories of protected areas and compiles the correlation between the international classification of the International Union for Conservation of Nature and Natural Resources (IUCN) and the SNUC:

Group	IUCN Category	SNUC Category	Origin	Description
Full Protection Units	Ia	Ecological station (Note: Before the SNUC Law, there were four federal ecological reserves, but two have already been reclassified as ecological stations. There are also two that will have their category redefined in accordance with article 55 of Law 9.985 of 2000.)	SEMA (1981)	Publicly owned and controlled, they are used for nature conservation and scientific research. Public visitation is prohibited, except for educational purposes. Scientific research requires prior authorization from the responsible agency.
Full Protection Units	Ia	Biological reserve	Animal Protection Act (1967)	Aimed at the integral preservation of the biota and other natural attributes existing within their boundaries, without direct human interference or environmental modifications, with the exception of measures to recover their altered ecosystems and the management actions necessary to restore and preserve the natural balance, biological diversity and ecological processes.
Full Protection Units	II	National park (Note: State parks and municipal natural parks belong to this category, but were created by a Brazilian state or municipality respectively.)	1934 Forest Code	Aimed at preserving natural ecosystems of great ecological importance and beauty, enabling scientific research and the development of environmental education and interpretation activities, as well as ecological tourism.
Full Protection Units	III	Natural monument	SNUC (2000)	Aimed at preserving rare, unique natural sites or those of great beauty.
Full Protection Units	III	Wildlife refuge	SNUC (2000)	Protection of natural environments that ensure conditions for the existence or reproduction of species or communities of local flora and resident or migratory fauna.
Sustainable Use Units	IV	Area of relevant ecological interest	SEMA (1984)	Smaller areas with little or no human occupation, which feature extraordinary natural characteristics or are inhabited by rare specimens of the regional biota, with the aim of maintaining natural ecosystems of regional or local importance and regulating the permissible use of these areas, in order to reconcile it with nature conservation objectives.
Sustainable Use Units	IV	Private natural heritage reserve	MMA (1996)	Privately owned with the aim of conserving biological diversity.
Sustainable Use Units	V	Environmental protection area (APA)	SEMA (1981)	Generally extensive areas with a certain degree of human occupation and endowed with abiotic, biotic, aesthetic or cultural attributes particularly important for the quality of life and well-being of human populations, whose basic objectives are to protect biological diversity, discipline the occupation process and ensure the sustainable use of natural resources.
Sustainable Use Units	VI	National forest (Note: Conservation Units in this category, if established at state or municipal level, will be called State Forest and Municipal Forest, respectively.)	1934 Forest Code	Areas with forest vegetation of predominantly native species. Its basic objective is the sustainable multiple use of forest resources and scientific research, focusing on methods for the sustainable exploitation of native forests.
Sustainable Use Units	VI	Sustainable development reserve	SNUC (2000)	Natural areas that are home to native populations, whose existence is based on sustainable systems of exploiting natural resources, developed over generations and adapted to local ecological conditions, which play a crucial role in protecting nature and maintaining biological diversity.
Sustainable Use Units	VI	Wildlife reserve	Animal Protection Act (1967) - under the name of Parques de Caça (English: Hunting Parks)	Natural area with animal populations of native species, terrestrial or aquatic, resident or migratory, suitable for technical-scientific studies on the sustainable economic management of wildlife resources.
Sustainable Use Units	VI	Extractive reserve	SNUC (2000)	Used by local populations whose livelihoods are based on extractivism, subsistence farming and small animal husbandry. The basic objectives are to protect the lifestyle and culture of these populations and to ensure the sustainable use of the unit's natural resources.

The availability of official information on all Brazilian conservation units through the National Registry of Conservation Units (CNUC) is an important step towards consolidating the SNUC.

=== Creation of units ===
Under current Brazilian legislation, Conservation Units are created by presidential or state decree after an evaluation of their ecological importance and can only be altered or reduced through bills. However, in 2012, the House of Representatives and the Senate approved, and President Dilma Rousseff sanctioned and transformed into federal law, a Provisional Measure that redefined the boundaries of seven Conservation Units in the Amazon.

== National Register of Conservation Units ==
National Register of Conservation Units
Category	Amount
Environmental protection area (APA)	379
Area of relevant ecological interest	61
Ecological station	98
National forest	108
Natural monument	62
National park	485
Wildlife refuge	79
Biological reserve	67
Sustainable development reserve	39
Wildlife reserve	0
Extractive reserve	95
Private natural heritage reserve	1 014

The National Registry of Conservation Units - CNUC (Portuguese: Cadastro Nacional de Unidades de Conservação) is an integrated database system with regularized information on the protected areas of the SNUC managed by the three levels of administration and by private entities. The Ministry of the Environment is responsible for organizing the CNUC, as established in article 50 of Law No. 9,985 of 2000. As of September 2020, there were 2,487 Conservation Units registered with the CNUC. The specific objectives of the CNUC can be summarized as:

- Availability of official information on the Conservation Units;
- Detailed reports on the situation of the Conservation Units to facilitate diagnoses, the identification of problems and decision-making;
- Possibility of creating and monitoring indicators regarding the status of implementation of the SNUC;
- Verification of compliance of Conservation Units with the rules and criteria for creation established in Law No. 9.985 of 2000;
- Availability of information for the planning, administration and inspection of Conservation Units;
- Assistance in distributing funds from environmental compensation, as these will be earmarked exclusively for protected areas recognized by the CNUC as belonging to the SNUC (Art. 11 of CONAMA Resolution 371 of 2006).

== See also ==
- National park (Brazil)
- Protected areas of Brazil
- List of Atlantic Forest conservation units
- List of state parks in São Paulo
