= Federal University of Minas Gerais Ecological Station =

Ecological station in Minas Gerais, Brazil

- Estação Ecológica da Universidade Federal de Minas Gerais
- IUCN category Ia (strict nature reserve)
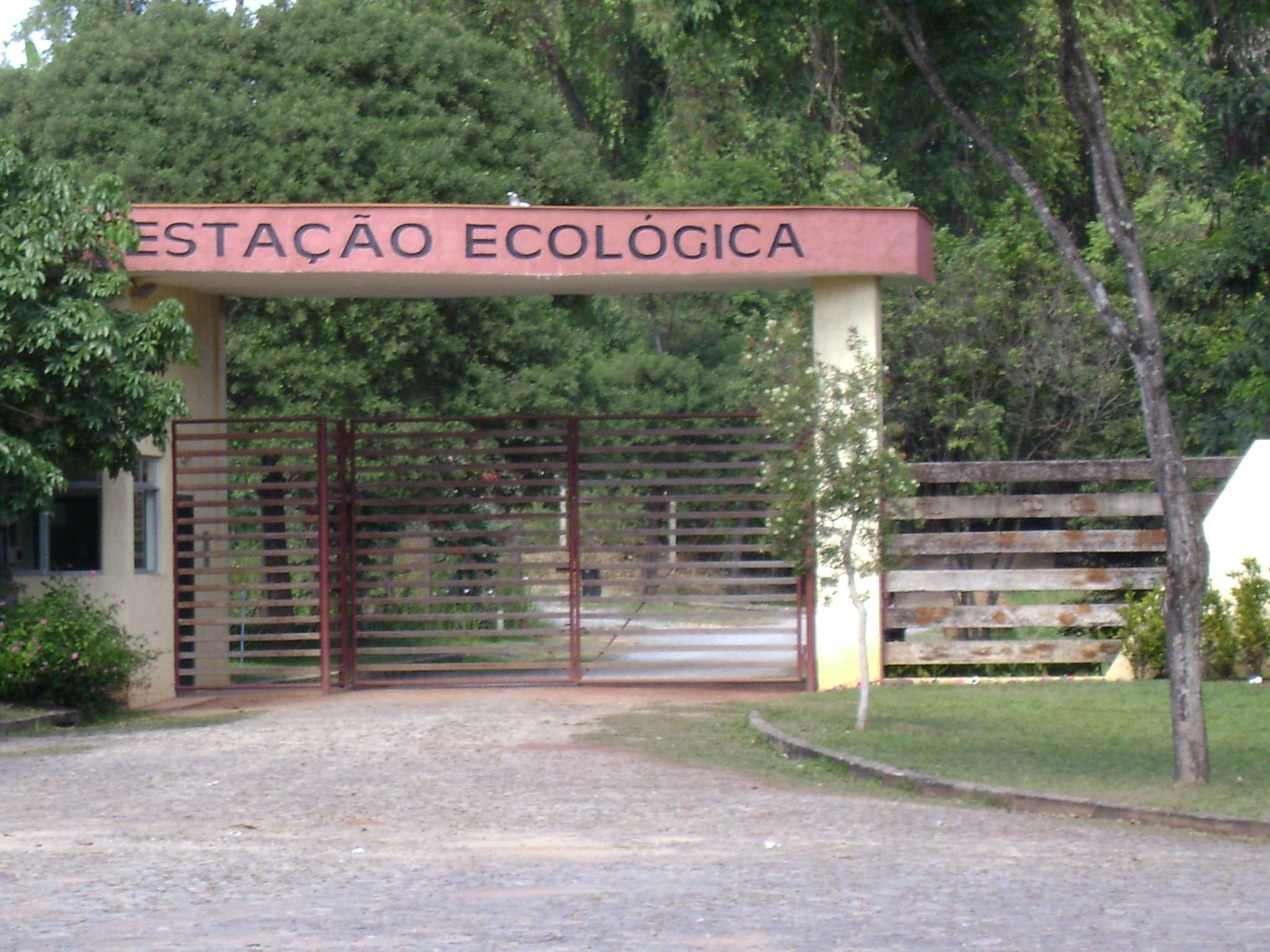
- Entrance to the station

- Location within Brazil
- Nearest city: Belo Horizonte, Minas Gerais
- Coordinates: 19.887358°S 43.973690°W
- Area: 114 hectares (280 acres)
- Designation: Ecological station
- Created: 29 July 1988
- Administrator: Federal University of Minas Gerais

The Federal University of Minas Gerais Ecological Station (Portuguese: Estação Ecológica da Universidade Federal de Minas Gerais) is an ecological station in the state of Minas Gerais, Brazil.

== Location ==
The Federal University of Minas Gerais Ecological Station is located on the Pampulha campus of the Federal University of Minas Gerais (UFMG). It is divided into two areas by Avenida Presidente Carlos Luz. The first area is bounded by the BR-262 ring road, the Army Ministry CPOR facility, the Nuclear Energy Commission, Rua Quatorze and Avenida Presidente Carlos Luz. The second area is bounded by BR-262, Rua Engenho Nogueira and Avenida Presidente Carlos Luz.

== History ==
The site of the ESEC was once occupied by the Dalva farm, and later by the Don Orione Boys' Home, inaugurated by Juscelino Kubitschek in 1944. There are still some traces at the site of pottery and buildings from the past. A proposal to create a conservation area on the campus was approved in January 1979. A committee was formed, and on 29 July 1988 an agreement was signed with the city of Belo Horizonte. The site, formerly abandoned and holding debris from the university, was restored and is now used for various research projects including a Master's course in Ecology Conservation and Wildlife Management.

== Environment ==
The ESEC is an urban conservation area of 114 hectares (280 acres) holding typical semi-deciduous forest and cerrado vegetation. It has very diverse flora and fauna, including mammals such as capybara (Hydrochoerus hydrochaeris), black-tufted marmoset (Callithrix penicillata) and opossum (Didelphis), amphibians and reptiles such as Tupinambis lizards and False coral snakes, and about 150 species of birds including squirrel cuckoo (Piaya cayana), toco toucan (Ramphastos toco), Penelope, Saíra and cinnamon tanager (Schistochlamys ruficapillus). Vegetation includes native species such as Guazuma ulmifolia (Mutamba), Cedar, Ipê, Cotieira and exotic species such as Eucalyptus, Mango (Mangifera indica) and Baobab (Adansonia).

== Sources ==
- "Histórico", Estação Ecológica UFMG (in Portuguese), Federal University of Minas Gerais
- "Localização", Estação Ecológica UFMG (in Portuguese), Federal University of Minas Gerais
- "Sobre a área", Estação Ecológica UFMG (in Portuguese), Federal University of Minas Gerais
