= Das Almas River (São Paulo) =

Das Almas River Rio das Almas (Portuguese)
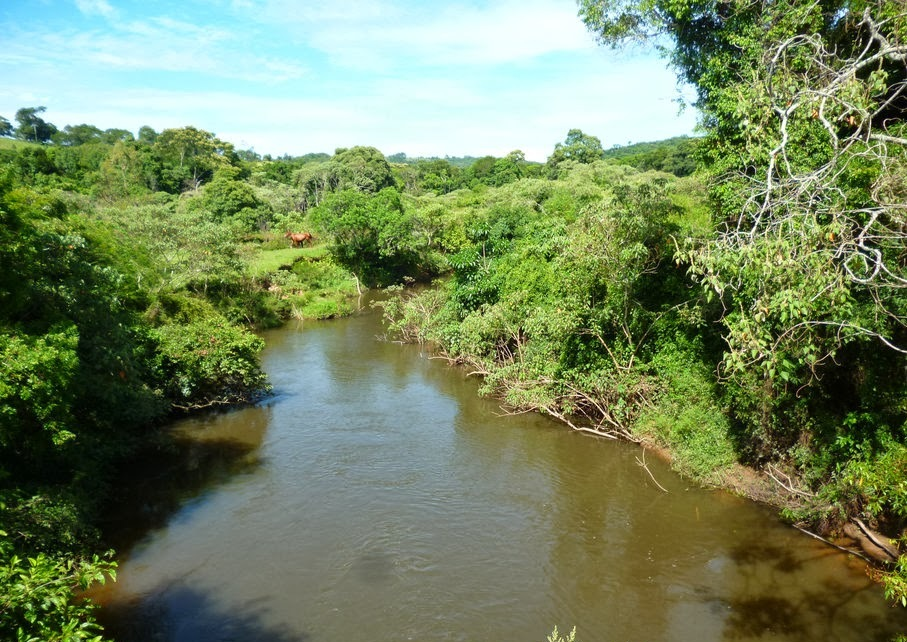
- The river at the boundary between Ribeirão Grande and Capão Bonito

- Location within Brazil

Location
- Country: Brazil

Physical characteristics
- Source
  - location: São Paulo state
- Mouth
  - coordinates: 23.853701°S 48.321216°W

Basin features
- River system: Paranapanema River

The Das Almas River (Portuguese: Rio das Almas) is a river of São Paulo state in southeastern Brazil. It is a tributary of the Paranapanema River.

The river rises in the Serra de Paranapiacaba near the Intervales State Park, and in its upper reaches flows through the 3,095 hectares (7,650 acres) Xitué Ecological Station, created in 1987.

== See also ==
- List of rivers of São Paulo
