= Águas Emendadas Ecological Station =

Protected area in Brazil

- Estação Ecológica de Águas Emendadas
- IUCN category Ia (strict nature reserve)
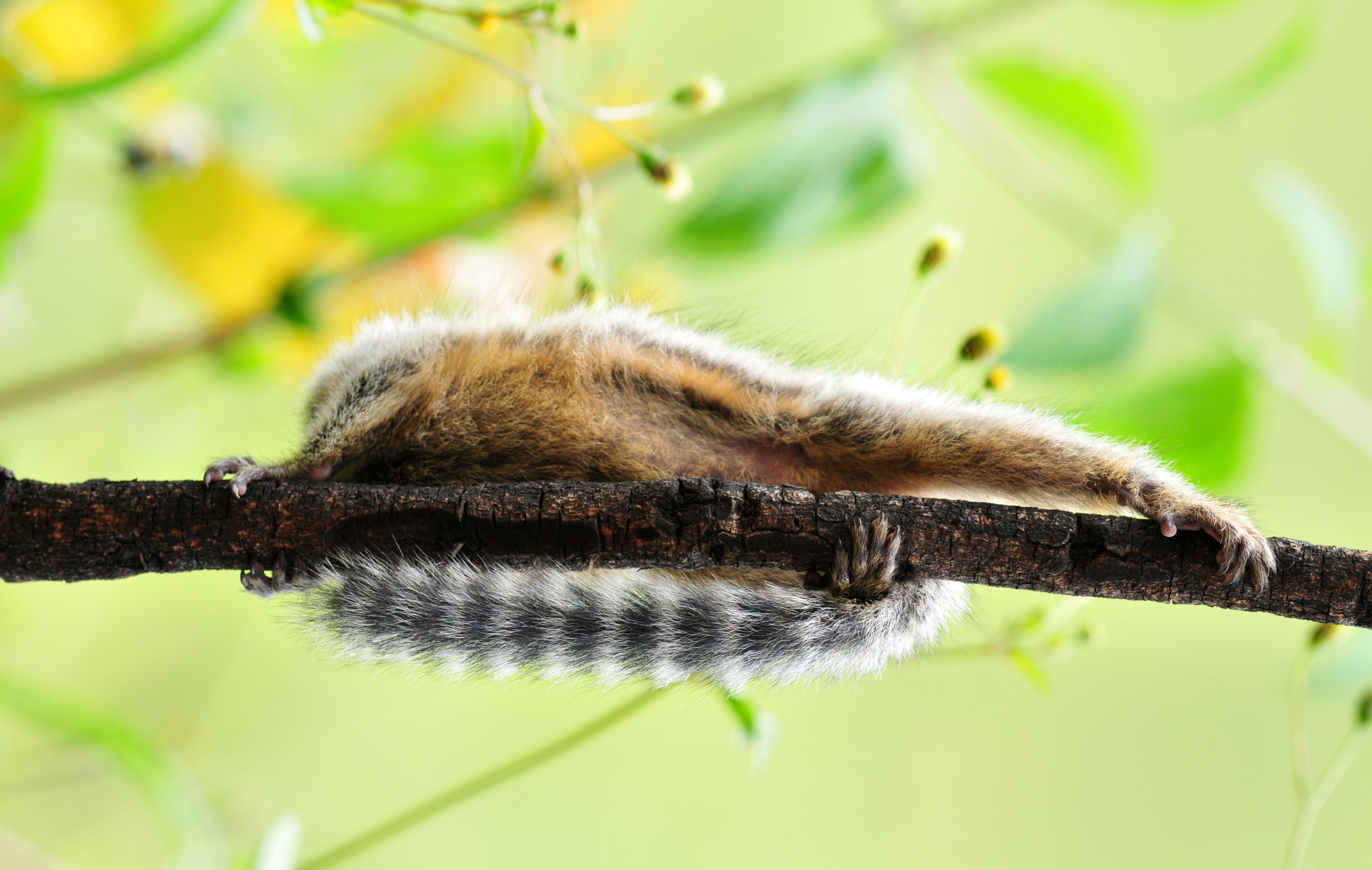
- Black-tufted marmoset in Águas Emendadas

- Location within Brazil
- Coordinates: 15°33′32″S 47°36′32″W
- Area: 10,547 hectares (26,060 acres)
- Designation: Ecological station
- Created: August 1968

The Águas Emendadas Ecological Station (Portuguese: Estação Ecológica de Águas Emendadas) is an ecological station in the Federal District, Brazil. It protects an area of cerrado biome in excellent condition, including savannah, scrub and forest. Streams flow from the station north into the Tocantins River basin, which connects to the Amazon River basin, and south into Río de la Plata basin. The flat terrain floods in the rainy season and lets fish pass between the river basins.

== Location ==
The Águas Emendadas Ecological Station is in the northeast of the Federal District and has an area of 10,547 hectares (26,060 acres). It is in the administrative region of Planaltina. It is a fully protected conservation unit for protecting the natural environment and supporting basic and applied research in ecology and for education in conservation. Public access is only allowed for researchers and for educational purposes. The unit has administration buildings and an Environmental Information Center with an auditorium. The unit is crossed by five roads, and animals are often killed by vehicles.

== History ==
The Águas Emendadas Biological Reserve was created in August 1968 with an area of 5,000 hectares (12,000 acres). Later it was doubled in size with the addition of the Mestre D´Armas or Bonita lagoon. It was reclassified as an ecological station by federal law 11.137 of 16 June 1988. Due to the excellent state of conservation of the ecosystems, in 1992 UNESCO declared it one of the areas that comprised the nucleus of the Cerrado Biosphere Reserve.

== Hydrology ==
Águas Emendadas lies on the height of land between the Tocantins River basin in the north and the Paraná River basin in the south. The Vereda Grande stream running to the north meets the Maranhão River, a tributary of the Tocantins. The Brejinho stream running south combines with the Fumal stream which feeds the São Bartolomeu River, which joins the Corumbá River, which in turn meets the Paranaíba River and forms the Paraná. Since the area is very flat, parts may flood during the rainy season from December to March. This allows fish from the two rivers basins to mingle.

== Environment ==
Vegetation includes the range of cerrado flora from open fields to scrub, dry and flooded gallery forest and marshland. Fires occur in the dry season between May and October. They used to be rare, but with the greater human population in the region now occur almost annually. The scorched vegetation revives when the rains come. There are large numbers of animals including the maned wolf, pampas deer, armadillo and anteater. Birds include toucans, parrots, caracara and seriemas.

== Sources ==
- Álfio Beccari, "O fascínio de Águas Emendadas", galileu (in Portuguese), Editora Globo
- "Estação Ecológica Águas Emendadas", eco.tur.Brasil (in Portuguese)
- "Estação Ecológica de Águas Emendadas", Ambiente Brasil (in Portuguese)
