= Ecological station =

The term ecological station may refer to

- Ecological station (Brazil), a category of strictly protected conservation units in Brazil
- Nature reserve, a more or less protected area in other countries
