= Bananal, São Paulo =

Municipality in the state of São Paulo in Brazil

Bananal
- Municipality
- Municipality of Bananal
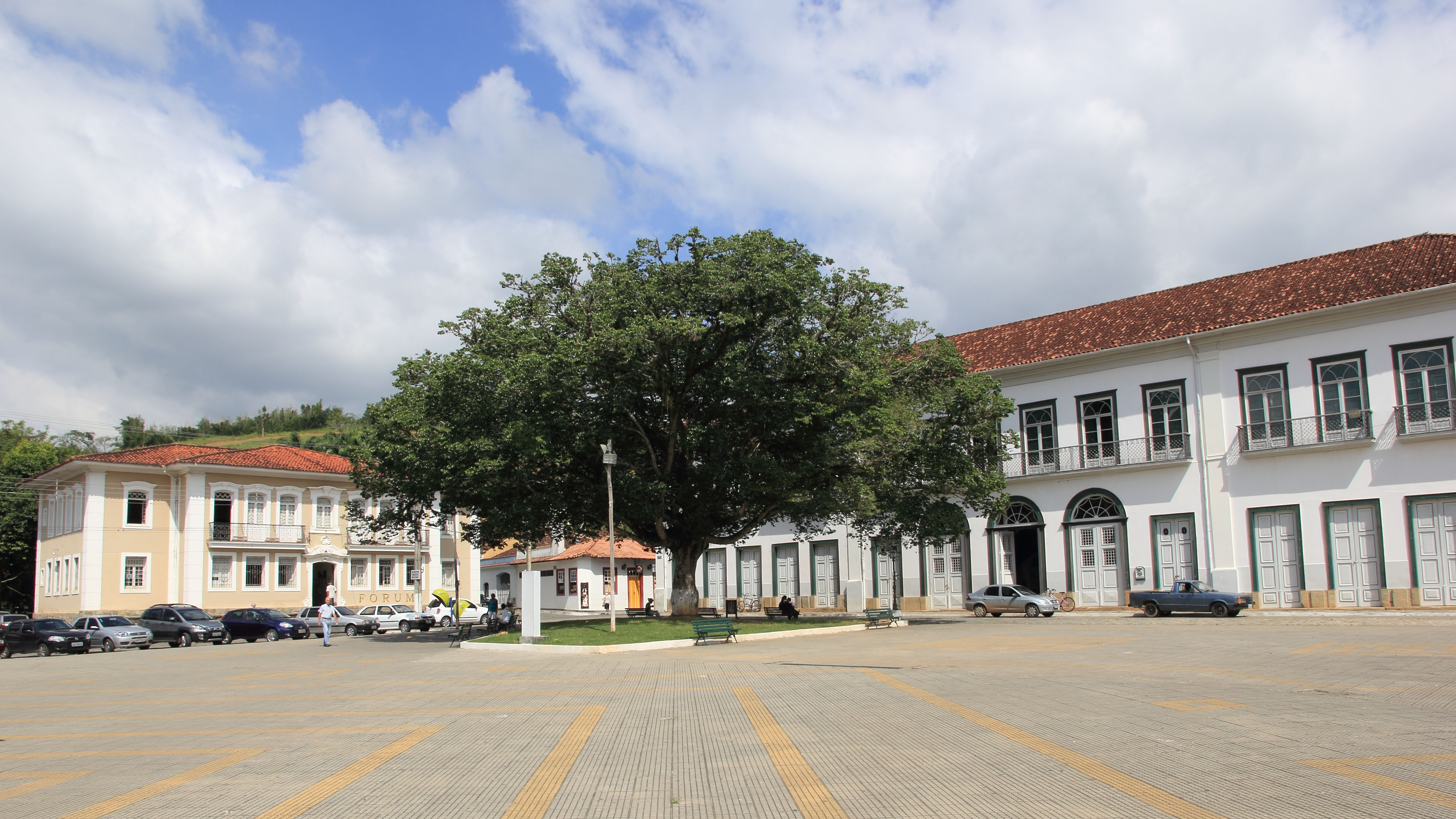
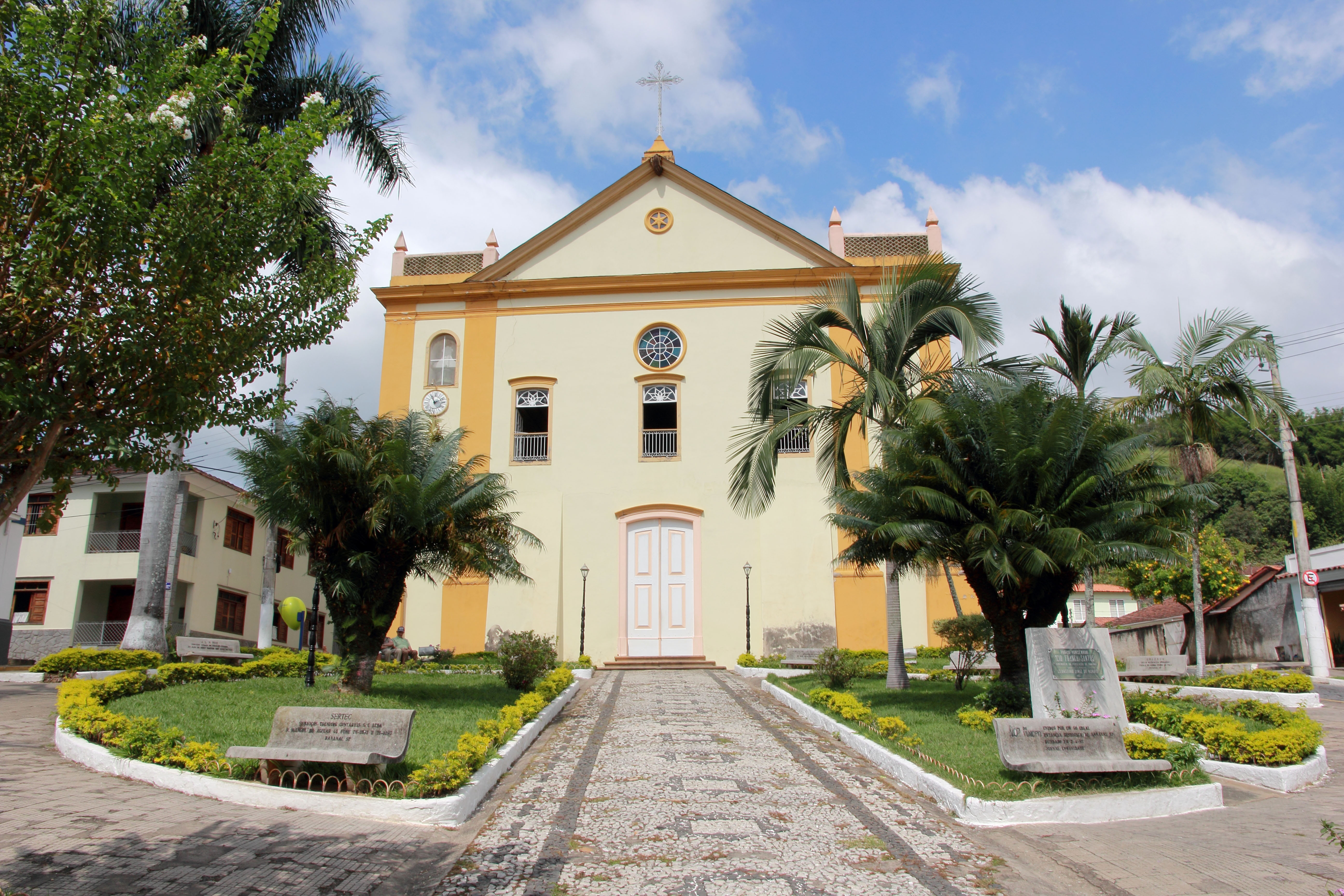
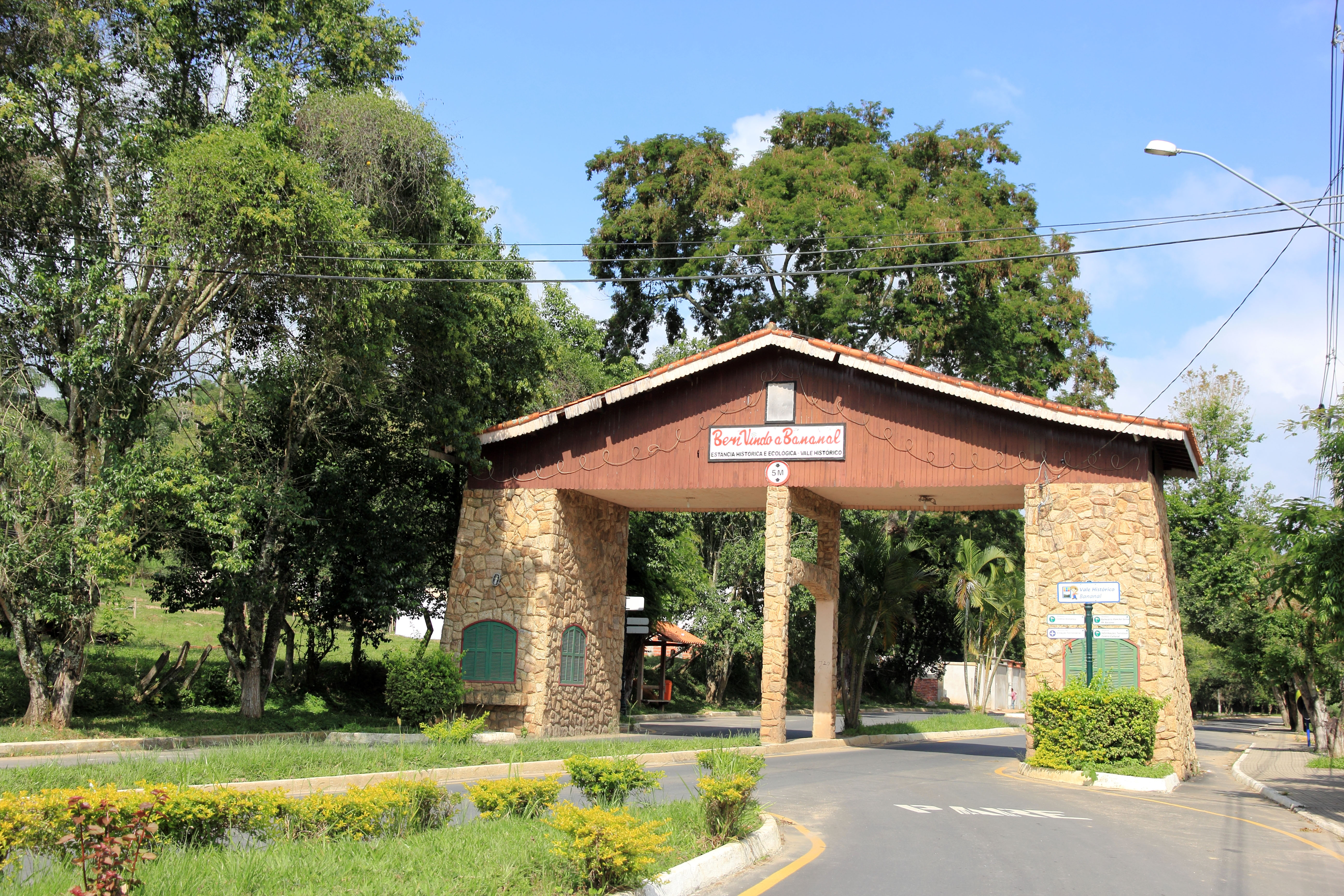
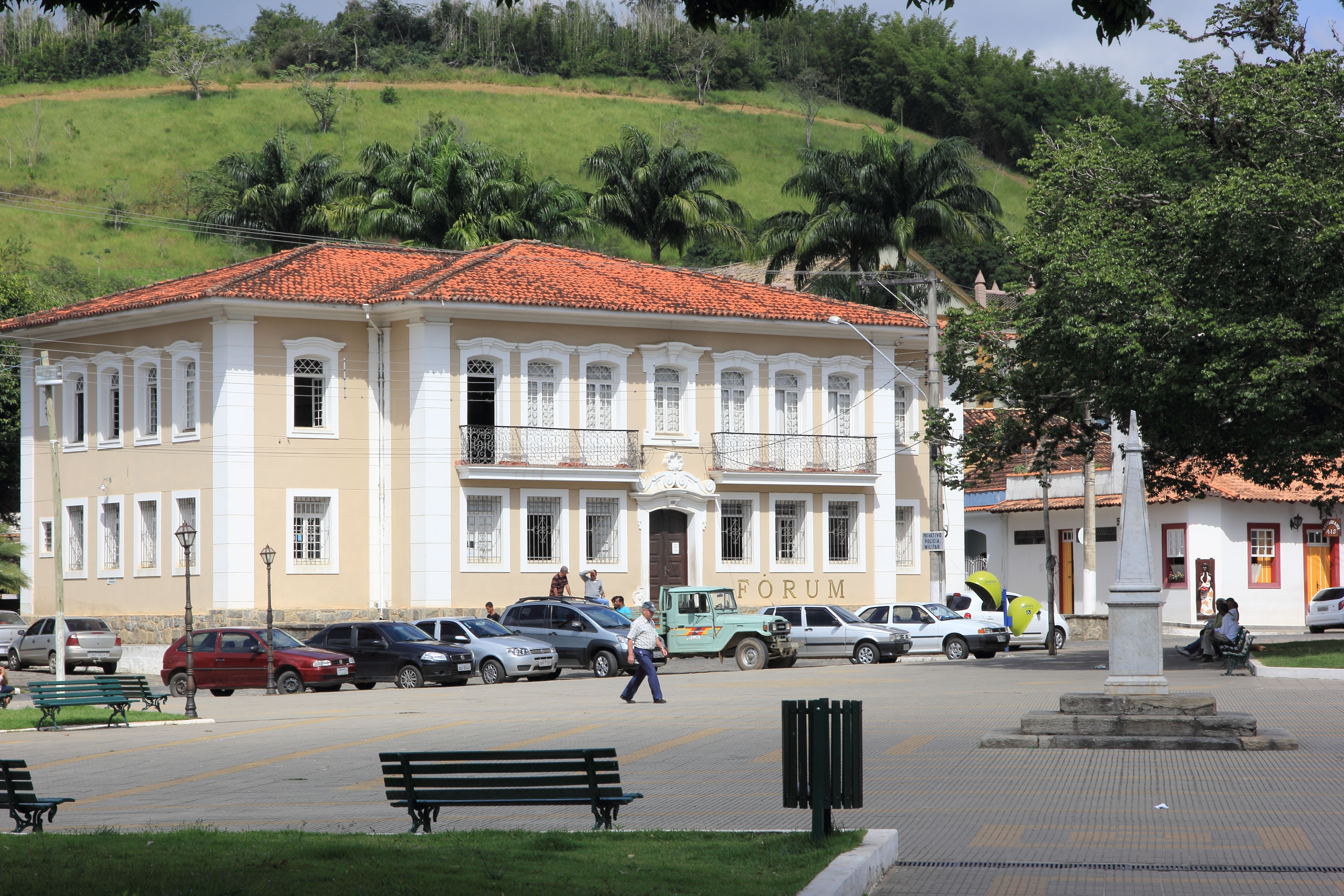
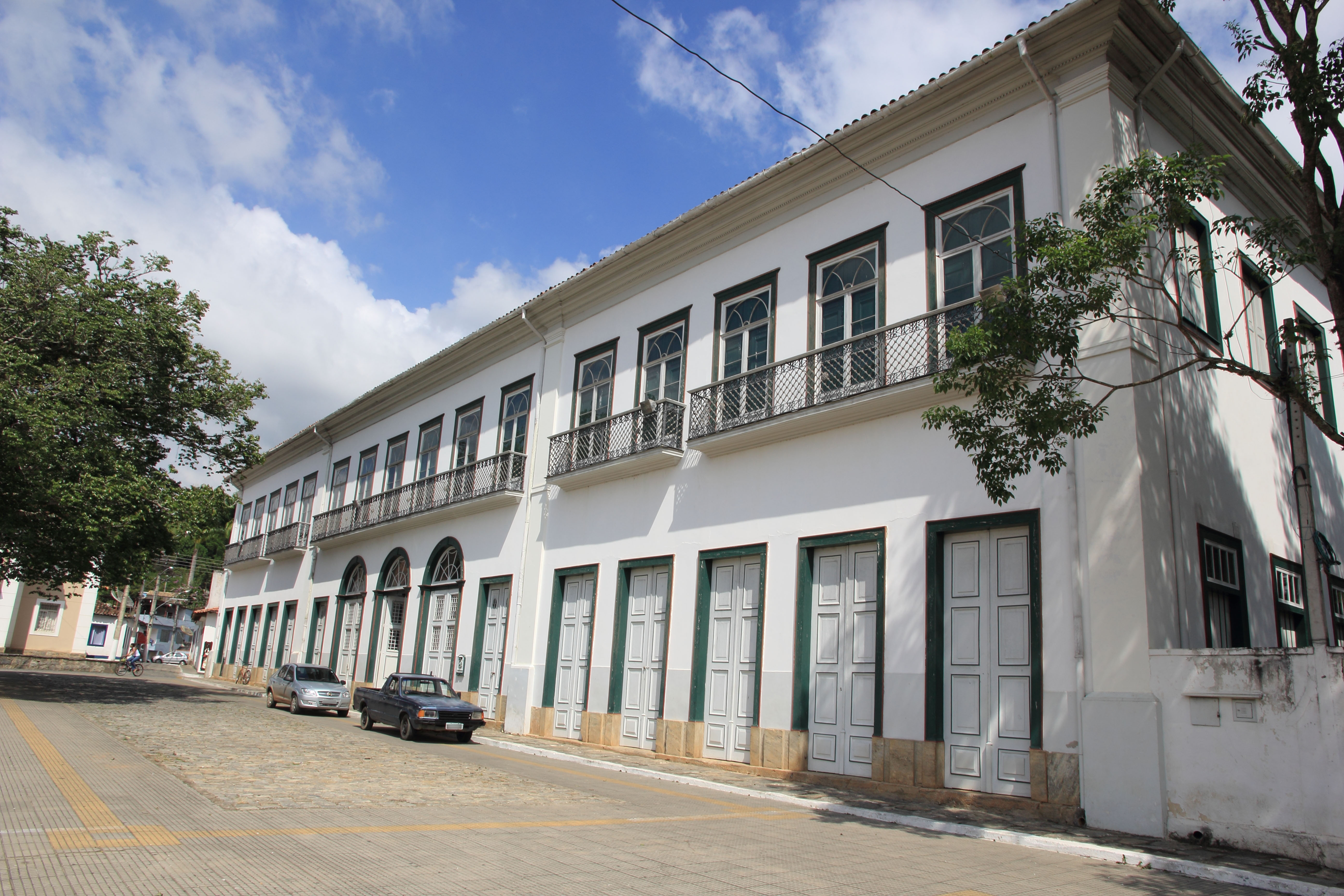

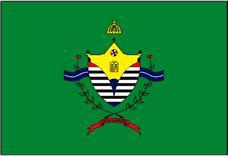
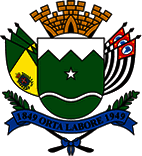
- Flag Coat of arms

- Location in São Paulo
- Coordinates: 22°41′02″S 44°19′25″W
- Country: Brazil
- Region: Southeast
- State: São Paulo
- Metropolitan Region: Vale do Paraíba e Litoral Norte
- Settled: July 10, 1783

Government
  - Mayor: Mirian Ferreira de Oliveira Bruno (PP)

Area
  - Total: 616.43 km^{2} (238.00 sq mi)
- Elevation: 454 m (1,490 ft)

Population (2020)
  - Total: 10,993
  - Density: 17.833/km^{2} (46.188/sq mi)
- Time zone: UTC−3 (BRT)
- HDI (2010): 0.733 – high
- Website: www.bananal.sp.gov.br

Município da Estância Turística de Bananal is a city in the state of São Paulo in Brazil. It is part of the Metropolitan Region of Vale do Paraíba e Litoral Norte. The population is 10,993 (2020 est.) in an area of 616.43 km^{2} (238.00 sq mi).

== Demographics ==
Historical population (municipality)
| Year | Population | %± |
|---|---|---|
| 1920 | 11,507 |
| 1940 | 11,566 | 0.5% |
| 1950 | 15,018 | 29.8% |
| 1960 | 12,810 | −14.7% |
| 1970 | 12,889 | 0.6% |
| 1980 | 10,969 | −14.9% |
| 1991 | 11,368 | 3.6% |
| 2000 | 9,713 | −14.6% |
| 2010 | 10,223 | 5.3% |
| 2022 | 9,969 | −2.5% |

== Geography ==
It borders three cities of Rio de Janeiro state (Barra Mansa to the north, Rio Claro to the east and Angra dos Reis to the south), as well as São José do Barreiro and Arapeí (both in São Paulo) to the west. It is the easternmost municipality in Sâo Paulo state.

It features a historical railway station imported from Belgium in 1888 and the Pharmácia Popular museum.

The municipality contains part of the 292,000-hectare (720,000-acre) Mananciais do Rio Paraíba do Sul Environmental Protection Area, created in 1982 to protect the sources of the Paraíba do Sul river. It also contains the 884-hectare (2,180-acre) Bananal Ecological Station, created in 1987.

== Media ==
In telecommunications, the city was served by Companhia de Telecomunicações do Estado de São Paulo until 1975, when it began to be served by Telecomunicações de São Paulo. In July 1998, this company was acquired by Telefónica, which adopted the Vivo brand in 2012.

The company is currently an operator of cell phones, fixed lines, internet (fiber optics/4G) and television (satellite and cable).

== See also ==
- List of municipalities in São Paulo
