= Santa Filomena, Piauí =

Municipality of Santa Filomena Município de Santa Filomena
- Location in Piauí and Brazil
- Coordinates: 09°06′43″S 45°55′19″W
- Country: Brazil
- Region: Northeast
- State: Piauí
- Settled: 1938

Government
  - Mayor: Ernani de Paiva Maia (PSDB)

Area
  - Total: 5,285.447 km^{2} (2,040.722 sq mi)

Population (2020)
  - Total: 6,254
  - Density: 1.2/km^{2} (3.1/sq mi)
- Time zone: UTC−3 (BRT)
- HDI (2000): 0.618 – medium

Santa Filomena is the westernmost city in the Brazilian state of Piauí. The city lies near the Parnaíba River, which forms the border with the state of Maranhão.

The municipality contains part of the Uruçui-Una Ecological Station.
