= Xitué Ecological Station =

Ecological station in Brazil

- Estação Ecológica Xitué
- IUCN category Ia (strict nature reserve)
- Paranapiacaba ecological continuum

- Location within Brazil
- Coordinates: 24.281949°S 48.334120°W
- Area: 3,095 hectares (7,650 acres)
- Designation: Ecological station
- Created: 1987
- Administrator: Fundação Florestal SP

The Xitué Ecological Station (Portuguese: Estação Ecológica Xitué) is an ecological station in the state of São Paulo, Brazil. It protects a mountainous area of Atlantic Forest.

== Location ==
The Xitué Ecological Station (ESEC) is in the Serra de Paranapiacaba in the municipality of Ribeirão Grande in the southeast São Paulo state. It has an area of about 3,095 hectares (7,650 acres). The station in on the Guapiara Plateau, with altitudes that range from 759 to 1,020 metres (2,490 to 3,346 ft). It adjoins the central section of the Intervales State Park to the south. To the northwest the ESEC adjoins the Hotel Paraíso Ecolodge, a sustainable ecotourism enterprise. It lies in the largest remnant of Atlantic Forest in the state, part of the Paranapiacaba ecological continuum. It is accessed through the Intervales State Park headquarters, about 270 kilometres (170 mi) from the state capital.

== History ==
The Xitué Ecological Station was created by state decree 26.890 of 1987, with the objective of ensuring full protection of flora, fauna and natural beauty, as well as supporting educational, recreational and scientific purposes. Since being created it has been the base for many research projects due to the good state of conservation of its forests. The ESEC is managed by the Forest Foundation of São Paulo.

São Paulo state decree 58.148 of 21 June 2012 created the Paranapiacaba Conservation Units Mosaic, including the Alto Ribeira Tourist State Park, Intervales State Park, Carlos Botelho State Park, Xitué Ecological Station, Nascentes do Paranapanema State Park and the portion of the Serra do Mar Environmental Protection Area in the municipalities of Eldorado, Sete Barras, Tapiraí, Juquiá, Ribeirão Grande and Capão Bonito. The purpose was to promote integrated and participatory management of the conservation units, and to seek to guarantee conservation of the areas covered.

On 30 March 2016 the State Council for the Environment (Consema) approved the management plan for the ESEC, which defines zoning, allowed use and measures to protect and promote biodiversity by integrating the unit into the economic and social life of the neighboring communities.

== Environment ==
The Köppen climate classification of the region is Cfb: temperate, humid with no dry season. Temperatures range from 9.4 to 29 °C (48.9 to 84.2 °F). Average annual rainfall is 1,400 to 1,600 millimetres (55 to 63 in). There is a rainy season from October to March and a cold and less rainy season from April to September.

Vegetation in the ESEC is 57.1% dense montane rainforest and 41.3% open rainforest with bamboos. There are small areas of dense alluvial rainforest (1.2%), dense upper montane rainforest (0.12%) and secondary growth (0.17%). The overstory is generally medium in height with an irregular canopy. There are two main trails in the ESEC. On the Xitué trail the bamboo Guadua tagoara dominates, with more developed vegetation in the valleys of the small stream that drain the area. On the Rio das Almas trail, which follows the das Almas River, there are more stretches with large trees. 123 native species of flora were identified in a study published in 2014, in 82 genera and 40 families. Nine species are in the São Paulo State, Brazil and global red lists.

91 species of birds have been identified in the ESEC, of which 48 are endemic to the Atlantic Forest biome. Eight species are considered endangered in the state of São Paulo. Of there two are also included in the list for Brazil and three in the global list. This includes the critically endangered Temminck's seedeater (Sporophila falcirostris).

== Sources ==
- Alckmin, Geraldo; Covas, Bruno (22 June 2012), "Decreto nº 58.148, de 21 de Junho de 2012", Diário Oficial (in Portuguese), 122 (116), Government of São Paulo
- Antunes, Alexsander Zamorano; Eston, Marilda Rapp de (2007), "Aves endêmicas e ameaçadas de extinção da Estação Ecológica de Xitué e a contribuição do taquaruçu Guadua tagoara (Nees) Kunth para a riqueza local", Revista do Instituto Florestal (in Portuguese), 19 (2), ISSN 0103-2674, archived from the original on 2016-12-20
- Consema aprova Plano de Manejo da Estação Ecológica de Xitué (in Portuguese), Fundação Florestal, 31 March 2016
- Estação Ecológica de Xitué (in Portuguese), Intervales State Park
- Estação Ecológica Xitué (in Portuguese), Via Rural, archived from the original on December 20, 2016
- Leiner, Natália Oliveira; Silva, Wesley Rodrigues (2012), "Non-volant small mammals at an Atlantic forest area situated nearby a limestone quarry (Limeira quarry), state of São Paulo, Brazil", Biota Neotropica, 12 (4)): 191–197, doi:10.1590/S1676-06032012000400020
- Souza, Flaviana Maluf; Cielo-Filho, Roque; Ivanauskas, Natália Macedo; Franco, Geraldo Antônio Daher Corrêa; Toniato, Maria Teresa Zugliani; Mattos, Isabel Fernandes de Aguiar; Kanashiro, Marina Mitsue; Aguias, Osny Tadeu; Baitello, João Batista (December 2014), "A Vegetação da Estação Ecológica de Xitué, Ribeirão Grande-SP: Subsídios para o Plano de Manejo", Instituto Florestal Série Registros (in Portuguese), 51 (51): 5–30, doi:10.4322/ifsr.2014.001
