= Pharmácia Popular =

Former pharmacy museum in Bananal, Brazil

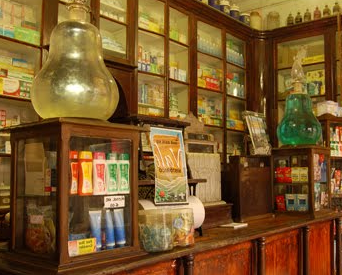
- Location: Bananal, Brazil
- Type: historic site

Pharmácia Popular (People's Pharmacy, English literal) was a pharmacy museum located in town of Bananal in the Brazilian state of São Paulo.

It was considered the oldest pharmacy in Brazil, founded in 1830 under the name Imperial Pharmacy, and was in operation until the death of its owner, Mr. Plínio Graça, on June 30, 2011.

== History ==
Inaugurated in 1830 with the name of Pharmácia Imperial by the French Tourin Domingos Mosnier. After 30 years, it was sold to Colonel Valeriano José da Costa. The pharmacy renamed as Pharmácia Popular at the end of the Brazilian monarchy in December 1889. The pharmacy was then purchased by Ernani Graça in 1922, and Plínio Graça, son of Ernani, inherited it in 1956 upon the condition that he kept the interior intact. He ran and maintained it until his death on June 30, 2011. The Graça family managed the establishment for 89 years.

While continuing to operate as a pharmacy, keeping the neoclassical interior, which was installed in the 19th century, Plínio ran also the pharmacy as a museum for the three decades prior to his death. Along with pine counters, and crystal amphorae, the pharmacy had a french tiled floor. After Plínio Graça's death, much of the original furniture was sold and removed from the site. Today, only the exterior of the building remains intact.

The pharmacy was listed by Council for the Defense of Historical, Archaeological, Artistic and Tourist Heritage in April 1991.

In 1997, the pharmacy served as a filming location for the TV series, "Dona Flor e seus Dois Maridos" (Dona Flor and her two husbands)
