= Mata Preta Ecological Station =

Ecological station in southern Brazil

- Estação Ecológica da Mata Preta
- IUCN category Ia (strict nature reserve)
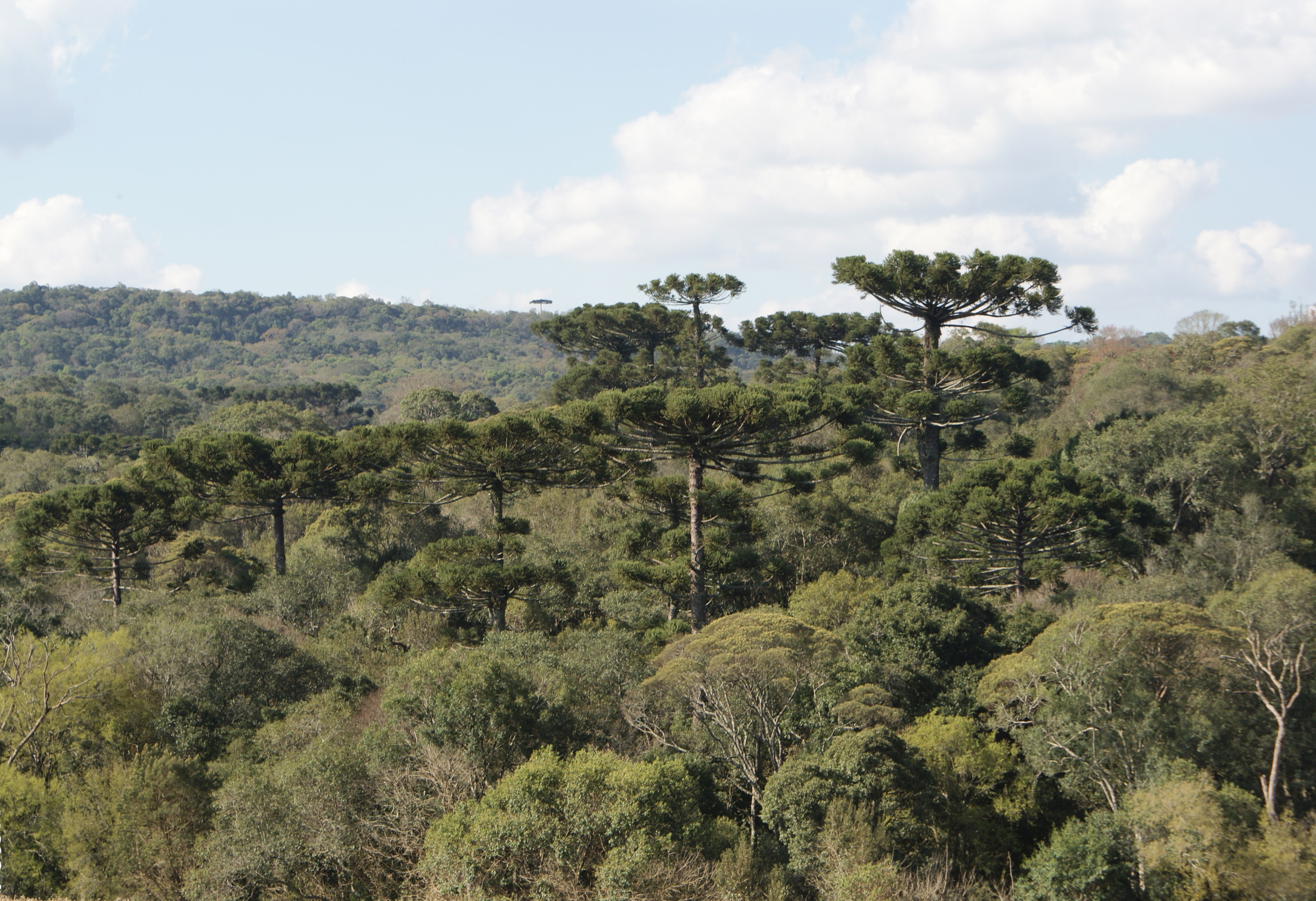
- View of the ESEC

- Location within Brazil
- Coordinates: 26°29′03″S 52°12′00″W
- Area: 6,566.50 hectares (16,226.2 acres)
- Designation: Ecological station
- Created: 19 October 2005
- Administrator: Chico Mendes Institute for Biodiversity Conservation

The Mata Preta Ecological Station (Portuguese: Estação Ecológica da Mata Preta) is an ecological station in the state of Santa Catarina, Brazil. It preserves fragments of Atlantic Forest vegetation, including endangered plant and animal species.

== Location ==
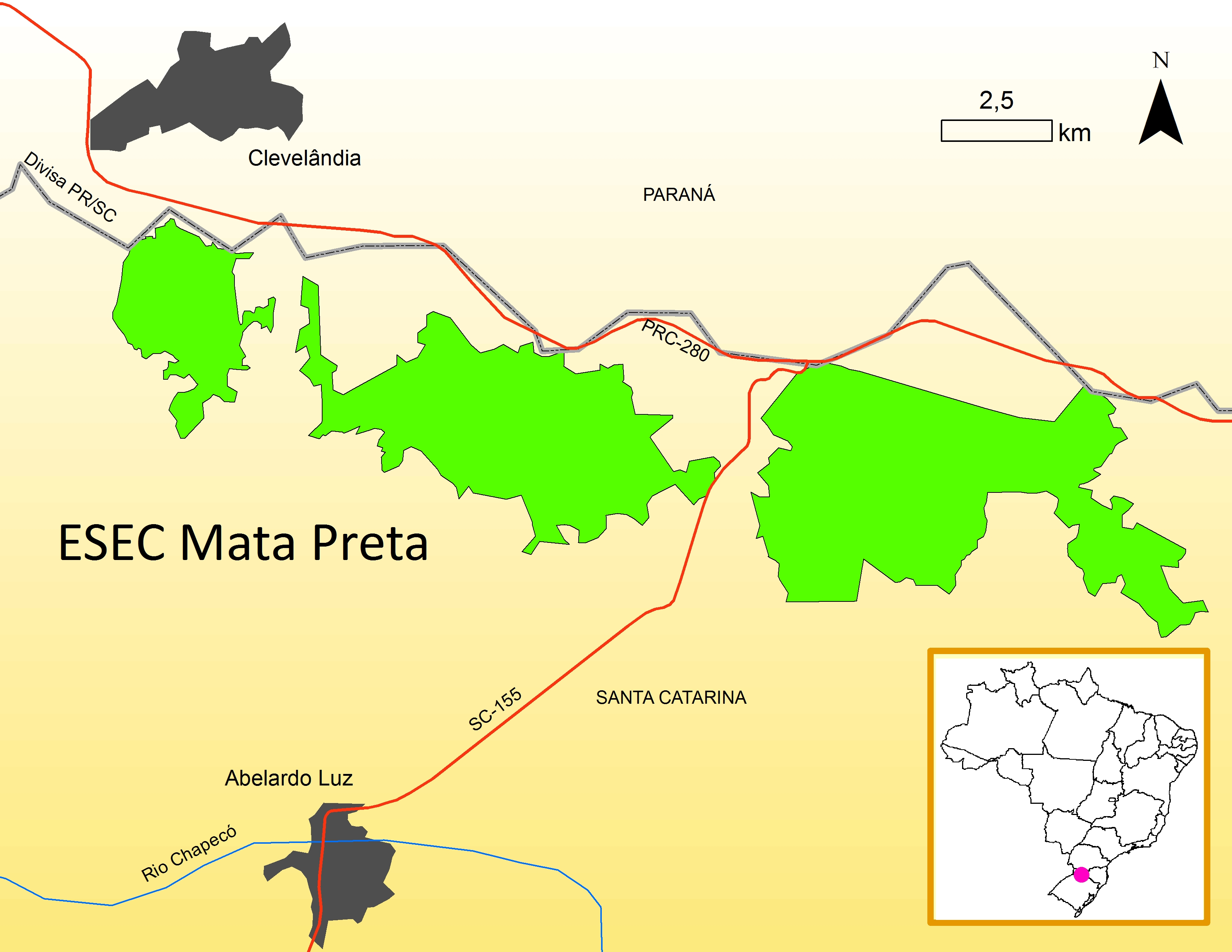
Map of the ESEC

The Mata Preta Ecological Station (ESEC) is in the municipality of Abelardo Luz, Santa Catarina. It has an area of 6,566.50 hectares (16,226.2 acres). The ESEC lies just south of the border with the state of Paraná. It is along the south of the section of the BR-280 highway between Clevelândia and Palmas, in three separate sections. The SC-155 highway divides the eastern section from the central section. The buffer zone is 500 metres (1,600 ft) wide and includes part of the municipality of Clevelândia.

== History ==
The Mata Preta Ecological Station was created on 19 October 2005. The process was very confrontational, with strong opposition from the landowners. The consultative council was created on 1 September 2010. As of 2016 the legal status was still not finalized and the owners of land in the ESEC had not been compensated. No field studies had been undertaken and there was no management plan.

The ESEC is classed as IUCN protected area category Ia (strict nature reserve). It has the objectives of conserving nature and supporting scientific research. It is administered by the Chico Mendes Institute for Biodiversity Conservation (ICMBio).

== Environment ==
The terrain is hilly, cut by small watercourses that feed the Chapecó River in the Uruguay River basin. Altitudes range from 830 to 1,050 metres (2,720 to 3,440 ft) above sea level. Average annual rainfall is 2,100 millimetres (83 in). Temperatures range from 10 to 30 °C (50 to 86 °F) with an average of 20 °C (68 °F).

The ESEC is in the Atlantic Forest biome. Vegetation is mainly mixed rainforest. The three sections of forest are in different stages of regeneration. One of them is well-preserved and holds an immense stand of Araucaria angustifolia, with tree species in the under story typical of the primary forest formation such as Ocotea porosa, Sloanea lasiocoma and Ilex paraguariensis. The other two fragments show the impact of human activity, with clearings in which there are different stages of succession growth. However, they contain rare and endangered tree species.

Important tree species include Dicksonia sellowiana, Parapiptadenia rigida, Cordia trichotoma, Ocotea pulchella, Nectandra lanceolata, Cedrela fissilis, Psychotria leiocarpa and Aechmea recurvata. Protected mammal and bird species include the ocelot (Leopardus pardalis), oncilla (Leopardus tigrinus), colocolo (Leopardus colocolo), cougar (Puma concolor), pygmy brocket (Mazama nana) and vinaceous-breasted amazon (Amazona vinacea).

The buffer zone contains small agricultural settlements, small and large farms and large pine plantations. There are huge fields of soy beans, wheat and corn. The region is under intense pressure from logging and agriculture. Apart from fragmentation, the ESEC is threatened by hunting, fires in the buffer zone fields in late winter, abandoned domestic animals, capture of wild animals for breeding in captivity and invasive exotic species.

== Sources ==
- "A Estação Ecológica da Mata Preta", Apremavi (in Portuguese)
- Esec da Mata Preta (in Portuguese), Chico Mendes Institute for Biodiversity Conservation, archived from the original on 2016-09-15
- ESEC da Mata Preta (in Portuguese), ISA: Instituto Socioambiental
- Unidade de Conservação: Estação Ecológica da Mata Preta (in Portuguese), MMA: Ministério do Meio Ambiente
