= Railway Station Bananal =

Railway station in Bananal, Brazil

Coordinates: 22°40′47″S 44°19′10″W

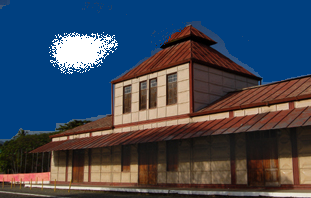

The Railway Station Bananal building is located in the historical and tourist city of Bananal in São Paulo State, Brazil. Built in 1888, it is the only specimen of steel construction in the Americas that was imported from Belgium.
