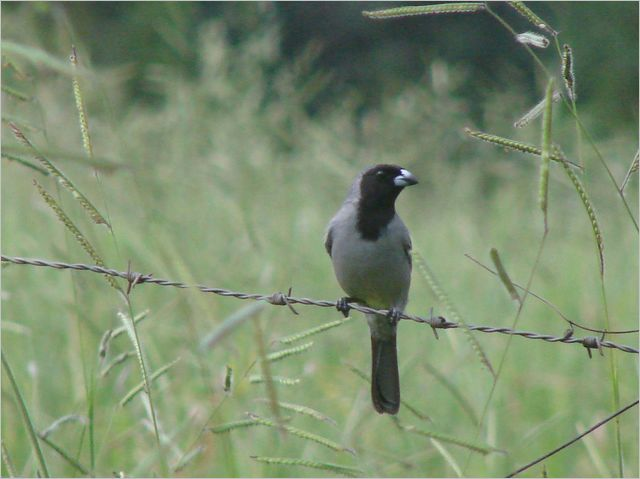

Conservation status
- Least Concern (IUCN 3.1)

Scientific classification
- Kingdom: Animalia
- Phylum: Chordata
- Class: Aves
- Order: Passeriformes
- Family: Thraupidae
- Genus: Schistochlamys
- Species: S. melanopis

Binomial name
- Schistochlamys melanopis (Latham, 1790)

Synonyms
- Schistoclamys melanopis (lapsus)

= Black-faced tanager =

Species of bird

The black-faced tanager (Schistochlamys melanopis) is a species of bird in the family Thraupidae.

It is found in Bolivia, Brazil, Colombia, Ecuador, French Guiana, Guyana, Paraguay, Peru, Suriname, and Venezuela. Its natural habitats are subtropical or tropical moist lowland forests, dry savanna, and subtropical or tropical dry shrubland.

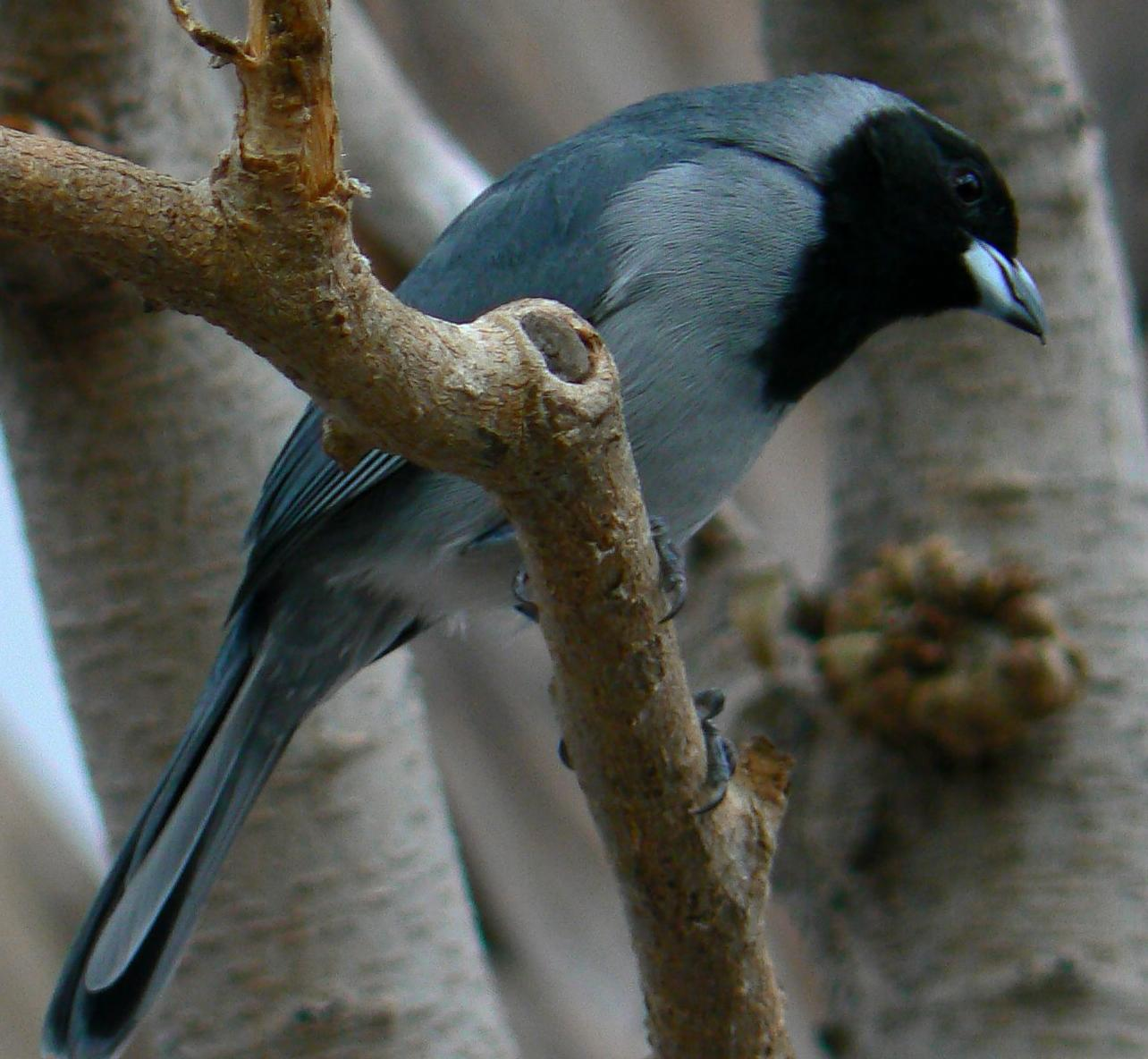
The black-faced tanager
