= Baixa Grande do Ribeiro =

Coordinates: 7.85°S 45.2139°W

- Municipality
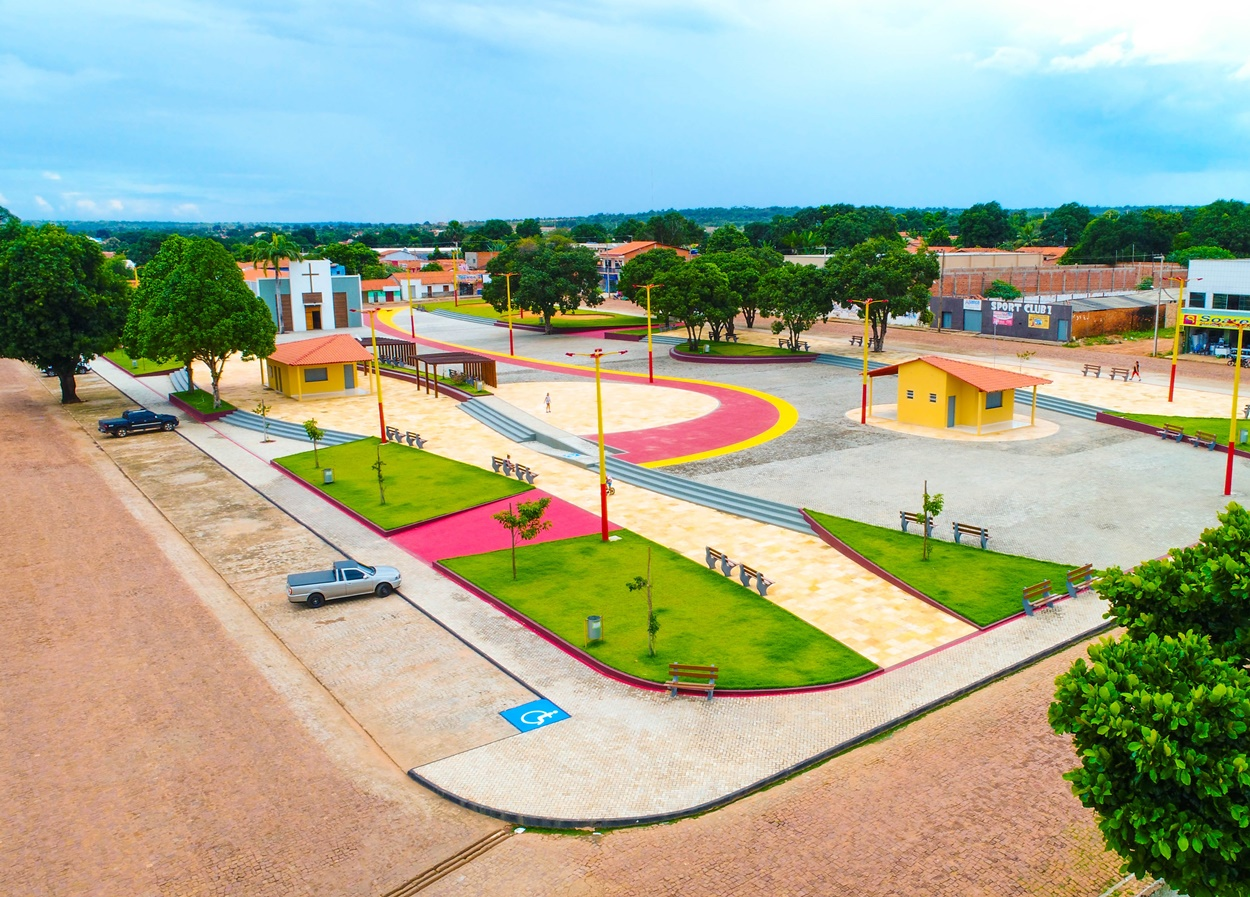

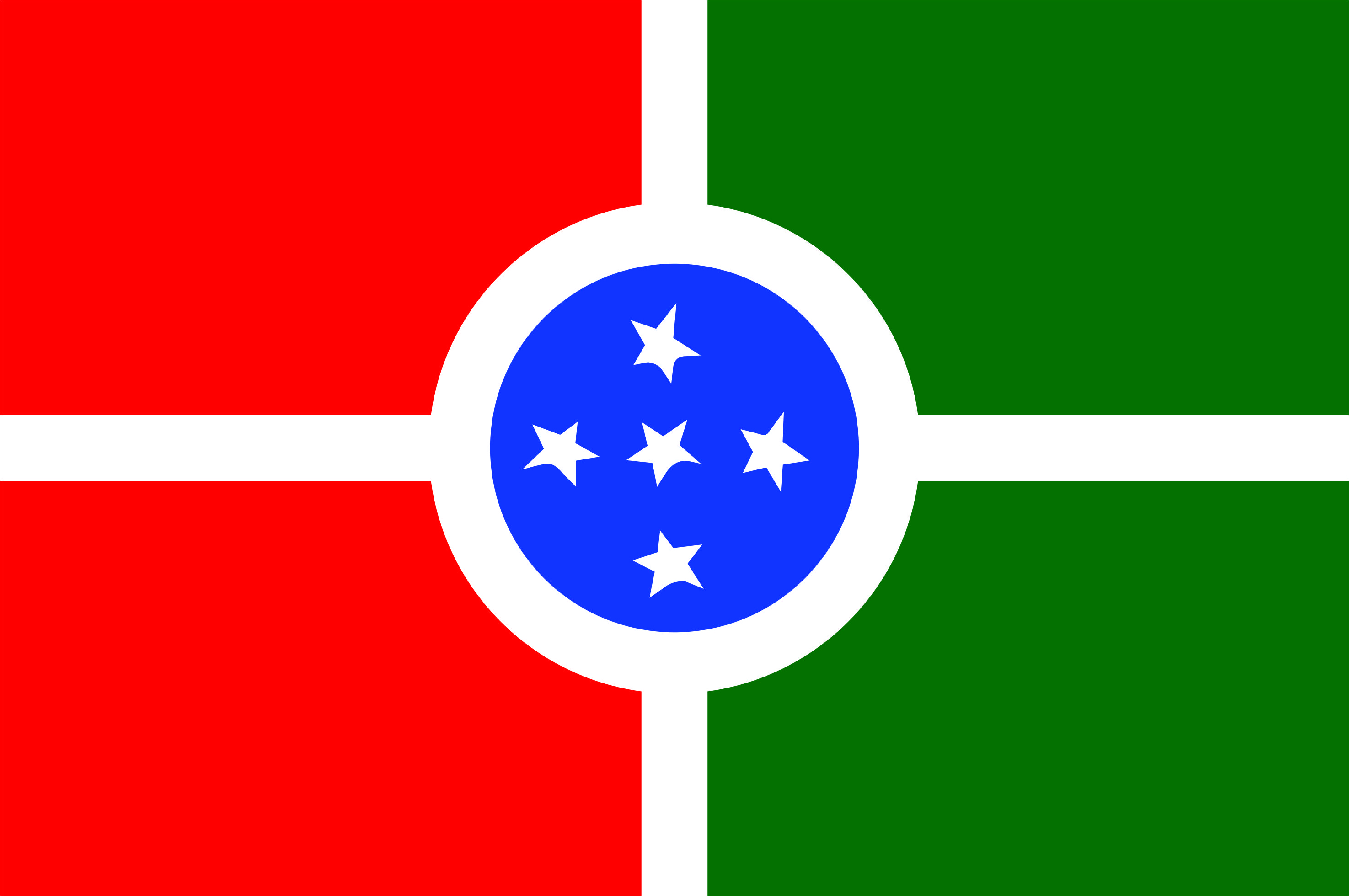
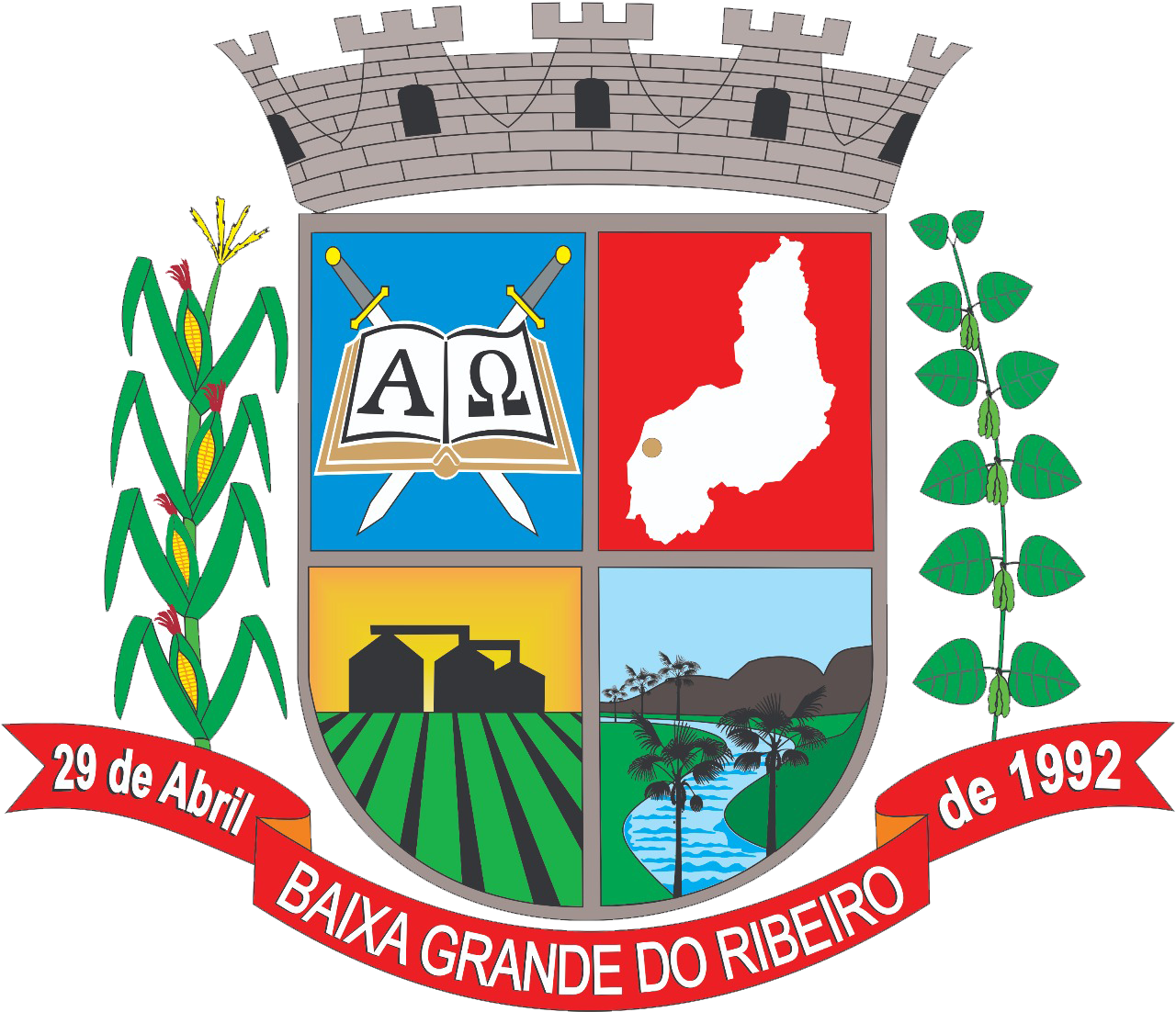
- Flag Coat of arms

- Country: Brazil
- Region: Nordeste
- State: Piauí
- Mesoregion: Sudoeste Piauiense

Population (2020)
  - Total: 11,671
- Time zone: UTC−3 (BRT)

Baixa Grande do Ribeiro is a municipality in the state of Piauí in the Northeast region of Brazil.

The municipality contains part of the Uruçui-Una Ecological Station.

== See also ==
- List of municipalities in Piauí
