= Clevelândia =

Coordinates: 26.3958°S 52.4708°W

- Municipality
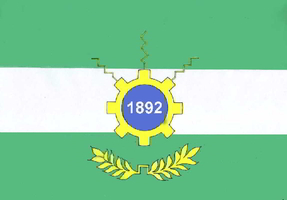
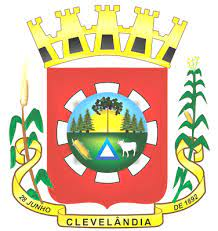
- Flag Seal

- Location in Paraná
- Country: Brazil
- Region: Southern
- State: Paraná
- Mesoregion: Centro-Sul Paranaense

Population (2020)
  - Total: 16,450
- Time zone: UTC−3 (BRT)

Clevelândia is a municipality in the state of Paraná in the Southern Region of Brazil. Its name is an homage to American president Grover Cleveland.

The municipality contains part of the buffer zone of the 6,566 hectares (16,220 acres) Mata Preta Ecological Station, a fully protected area created in 2005.

== Climate ==
Climate data for Clevelândia, elevation 930 m (3,050 ft), (1973–2012)
Month	Jan	Feb	Mar	Apr	May	Jun	Jul	Aug	Sep	Oct	Nov	Dec	Year
Record high °C (°F)	32.2 (90.0)	32.8 (91.0)	34.8 (94.6)	31.4 (88.5)	28.4 (83.1)	25.6 (78.1)	26.4 (79.5)	30.4 (86.7)	33.2 (91.8)	32.8 (91.0)	36.0 (96.8)	34.0 (93.2)	36.0 (96.8)
Mean daily maximum °C (°F)	27.0 (80.6)	26.8 (80.2)	26.4 (79.5)	23.8 (74.8)	20.1 (68.2)	18.7 (65.7)	18.8 (65.8)	20.9 (69.6)	21.6 (70.9)	24.0 (75.2)	25.7 (78.3)	26.6 (79.9)	23.4 (74.1)
Daily mean °C (°F)	21.0 (69.8)	20.9 (69.6)	20.1 (68.2)	17.6 (63.7)	14.3 (57.7)	13.0 (55.4)	12.9 (55.2)	14.5 (58.1)	15.4 (59.7)	17.8 (64.0)	19.3 (66.7)	20.6 (69.1)	17.3 (63.1)
Mean daily minimum °C (°F)	16.9 (62.4)	16.9 (62.4)	15.9 (60.6)	13.6 (56.5)	10.5 (50.9)	9.2 (48.6)	8.9 (48.0)	10.0 (50.0)	10.9 (51.6)	13.2 (55.8)	14.4 (57.9)	16.0 (60.8)	13.0 (55.5)
Record low °C (°F)	8.4 (47.1)	6.8 (44.2)	2.6 (36.7)	0.4 (32.7)	−2.2 (28.0)	−4.0 (24.8)	−5.6 (21.9)	−4.7 (23.5)	−2.6 (27.3)	0.4 (32.7)	2.8 (37.0)	6.4 (43.5)	−5.6 (21.9)
Average precipitation mm (inches)	189.8 (7.47)	166.6 (6.56)	132.7 (5.22)	172.5 (6.79)	176.0 (6.93)	162.0 (6.38)	144.2 (5.68)	126.2 (4.97)	166.2 (6.54)	236.7 (9.32)	180.8 (7.12)	183.2 (7.21)	2,036.9 (80.19)
Average precipitation days (≥ 1.0 mm)	15	14	11	10	10	10	10	9	11	13	12	13	138
Average relative humidity (%)	78	80	78	78	79	79	76	72	73	74	71	74	76
Mean monthly sunshine hours	222.7	194.9	220.3	197.4	190.5	171.7	192.6	201.7	183.5	200.7	228.9	228.9	2,433.8
Source: IDR-Paraná

== See also ==
- List of municipalities in Paraná
