= Abelardo Luz =

- Municipality
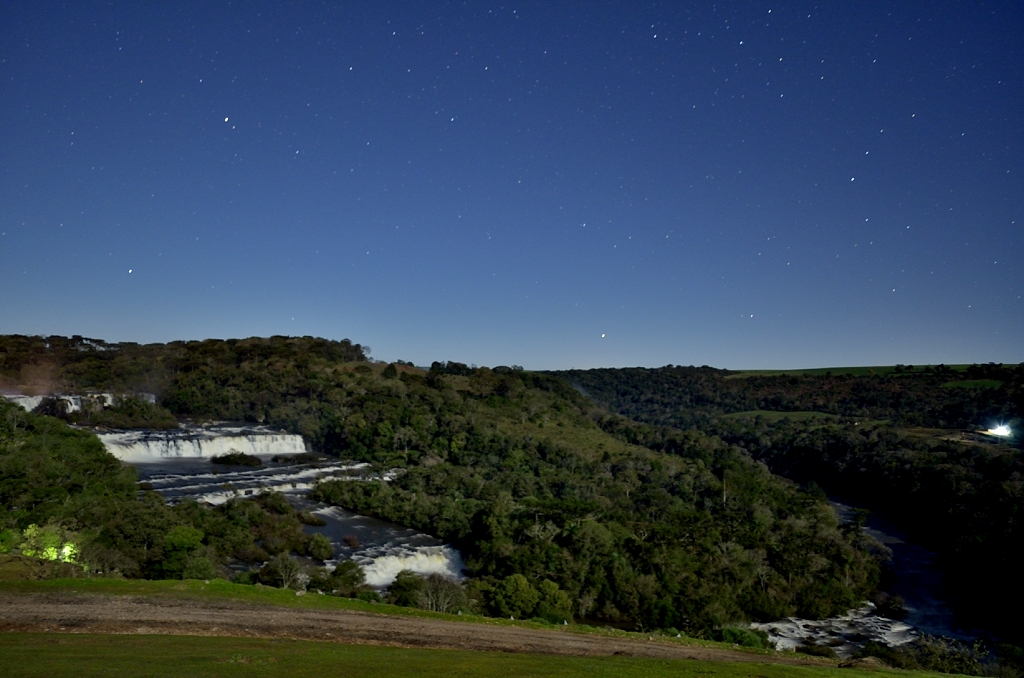

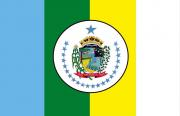
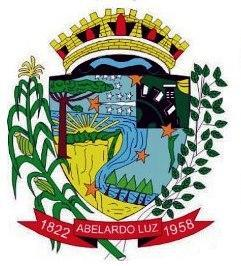
- Flag Coat of arms

- Location in Santa Caterina
- Coordinates: 26°33′53″S 52°19′42″W
- Country: Brazil
- State: Santa Catarina
- Mesoregion: Oeste Catarinense
- Established: 1958

Government
  - Prefect: Dilmar Antonio Fantinelli

Area
  - Total: 953.58 km^{2} (368.18 sq mi)
- Elevation: 760 m (2,490 ft)

Population (2020)
  - Total: 17,960
  - Density: 18.83/km^{2} (48.78/sq mi)
- Demonym: Abelardo-Lusenses
- Time zone: UTC−3 (BRT)

Abelardo Luz is a Brazilian municipality in the state of Santa Catarina. Until 1958 it was part of the municipality of Xanxerê. It is the birthplace of Brazilian former football player Paulo Roberto Falcão.

The municipality contains the 6,566 hectares (16,220 acres) Mata Preta Ecological Station, a fully protected area created in 2005.

== Climate ==
Climate data for Abelardo Luz, elevation 935 m (3,068 ft), (1976–2005)
Month	Jan	Feb	Mar	Apr	May	Jun	Jul	Aug	Sep	Oct	Nov	Dec	Year
Record high °C (°F)	33.8 (92.8)	34.4 (93.9)	35.0 (95.0)	34.0 (93.2)	30.4 (86.7)	28.4 (83.1)	28.4 (83.1)	32.0 (89.6)	33.8 (92.8)	33.4 (92.1)	38.4 (101.1)	33.4 (92.1)	38.4 (101.1)
Mean daily maximum °C (°F)	28.4 (83.1)	28.6 (83.5)	27.8 (82.0)	26.4 (79.5)	23.0 (73.4)	20.9 (69.6)	19.8 (67.6)	22.5 (72.5)	23.1 (73.6)	25.8 (78.4)	28.6 (83.5)	28.3 (82.9)	25.3 (77.5)
Daily mean °C (°F)	22.0 (71.6)	21.8 (71.2)	20.9 (69.6)	19.0 (66.2)	15.9 (60.6)	14.5 (58.1)	13.5 (56.3)	15.3 (59.5)	16.3 (61.3)	18.9 (66.0)	20.5 (68.9)	21.7 (71.1)	18.4 (65.0)
Mean daily minimum °C (°F)	16.4 (61.5)	16.3 (61.3)	15.1 (59.2)	14.0 (57.2)	11.1 (52.0)	9.9 (49.8)	9.0 (48.2)	10.2 (50.4)	11.2 (52.2)	13.4 (56.1)	15.0 (59.0)	16.6 (61.9)	13.2 (55.7)
Record low °C (°F)	10.4 (50.7)	8.2 (46.8)	5.0 (41.0)	5.6 (42.1)	−1.8 (28.8)	−3.2 (26.2)	−6.0 (21.2)	−2.3 (27.9)	−2.1 (28.2)	5.5 (41.9)	2.3 (36.1)	6.0 (42.8)	−6.0 (21.2)
Average precipitation mm (inches)	208.8 (8.22)	201.5 (7.93)	144.9 (5.70)	159.7 (6.29)	204.6 (8.06)	171.8 (6.76)	174.3 (6.86)	131.9 (5.19)	182.1 (7.17)	181.1 (7.13)	151.5 (5.96)	166.7 (6.56)	2,078.9 (81.83)
Average relative humidity (%)	78	80	80	82	82	82	83	80	80	80	73	78	80
Mean monthly sunshine hours	155	183	166	173	168	157	188	197	153	157	244	230	2,171
Source: Empresa Brasileira de Pesquisa Agropecuária (EMBRAPA)
