= Bananal Ecological Station =

Ecological station in São Paulo, Brazil

- Estação Ecológica de Bananal
- IUCN category Ia (strict nature reserve)
- Location within Brazil
- Nearest city: Bananal, São Paulo
- Coordinates: 22.766584°S 44.334130°W
- Area: 884 hectares (2,180 acres)
- Designation: Ecological station
- Created: 12 March 1987
- Administrator: Instituto Florestal (SP)

The Bananal Ecological Station (Portuguese: Estação Ecológica de Bananal) is an Ecological station in the state of São Paulo, Brazil.

== Location ==
The Bananal Ecological Station is in the municipality of Bananal, São Paulo. It has an area of 884 hectares (2,180 acres). It is in a region of the Serra da Bocaina with sharp relief. Altitudes range from 1,200 to 1,900 metres (3,900 to 6,200 ft). It is part of the 221,754 hectares (547,970 acres) Bocaina Mosaic, created in 2006. Visitors must obtain permission from the station's management, who will assign an employee as a guide. There is a short 300 metres (980 ft) trail to the last fall of the Sete Quedas waterfalls, a scenic attraction.

== Environment ==
The climate is humid subtropical, with three dry months in the year. Average annual rainfall is 1,250 to 1,500 millimetres (49 to 59 in). Average annual temperature is 20 to 33 °C (68 to 91 °F). Maximum average temperature in 36 to 38 °C (97 to 100 °F) and minimum average temperature is 0 to 4 °C (32 to 39 °F). The ecological station contains remnants of Atlantic Forest. Vegetation includes cloud forest and dense montane and submontane rainforest. Two new species of bromeliad have only been found in the station, Neoregelia pontuali and Wittrockia corallina.

== History ==
The Bananal State Forest Reserve was created by state decree 43.193 of 3 April 1964 to conserve the forest and preserve the flora and fauna. On 12 March 1987 governor André Franco Montoro altered the category of the reserve to create the Bananal Ecological Station. The station is funded in partnership between the São Paulo secretariat of the environment and the German KfW bank.

== Sources ==
- Bananal: Sobre a Estação Ecológica (in Portuguese), SAP: Sistema Ambiental Paulista
- ESEC de Bananal (in Portuguese), ISA: Instituto Socioambiental
- Estação Ecológica de Bananal (in Portuguese), State of São Paulo, archived from the original on 2016-09-23
- Mosaico de Unidades de Conservação da Bocaina - SP e RJ (PDF) (in Portuguese), RBMA, archived from the original (PDF) on 2016-10-11
