= Porto Estrela =

Coordinates: 15.3239°S 57.2278°W

- Municipality
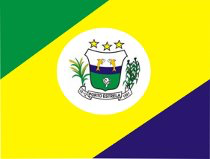
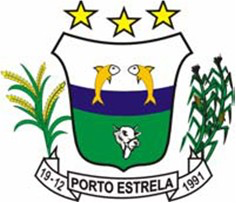
- Flag Coat of arms

- Country: Brazil
- Region: Southeast
- State: Mato Grosso
- Mesoregion: Sudoeste Mato-Grossense

Population (2020)
  - Total: 2,877
- Time zone: UTC−3 (BRT)

Porto Estrela is a municipality in the state of Mato Grosso in the Central-West Region of Brazil.

The municipality contains part of the Serra das Araras Ecological Station.

== See also ==
- List of municipalities in Mato Grosso
