= Serra das Araras Ecological Station =

Protected area in Mato Grosso, Brazil

- Estação Ecológica da Serra das Araras
- IUCN category Ia (strict nature reserve)
- Location within Brazil
- Nearest city: Cuiabá, Mato Grosso
- Coordinates: 15°38′13″S 57°11′13″W
- Area: 28,637 hectares (70,760 acres)
- Designation: ecological station
- Created: 31 May 1982

Serra das Araras Ecological Station (Portuguese: Estação Ecológica da Serra das Araras) is an ecological station in Mato Grosso, Brazil. It contains a sample of the Cerrado biome.

== Location ==
The reserve, which has an area of 28,637 hectares (70,760 acres), was created on 31 May 1982. It is administered by the Chico Mendes Institute for Biodiversity Conservation. It covers parts of the Cáceres and Porto Estrela municipalities of Mato Grosso.

== Environment ==
The ecological station contains an area of the Cerrado biome and lies in the corridor linking the Amazon and Pantanal regions. It is in an area of parallel mountain ranges that forms the watershed between the Cuiabá and Paraguay rivers in the Parana river basin, and the Arinos and Teles Pires rivers of the Amazon basin. The Salobro River, a left tributary of the Paraguay River, is formed in the station by the confluence of the Camarinha, Miranda, Pedro, Ribeirão, Salobinha and Três Ribeirões streams, which start in the station, and the Cajurú, Córrego Velho, Fundo, Quilombo and Pacova do Eugênio, which start outside the station.

== Conservation ==
The reserve is classified as International Union for Conservation of Nature (IUCN) category Ia (strict nature reserve). The purpose is to preserve nature and support scientific research. The endangered White-cheeked spider monkey (Ateles marginatus) and critically endangered blue-eyed ground dove (Columbina cyanopis) is protected in the reserve.

== Sources ==
- Estação Ecológica Serra das Araras (in Portuguese), Chico Mendes Institute for Biodiversity Conservation, archived from the original on 2016-03-03
- Unidade de Conservação: Estação Ecológica da Serra das Araras (in Portuguese), MMA: Ministério do Meio Ambiente
