= Anhembi =

Municipality in the state of São Paulo in Brazil

- Municipality
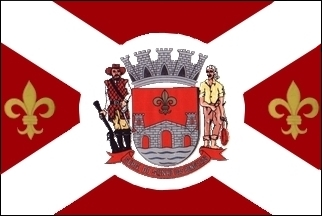
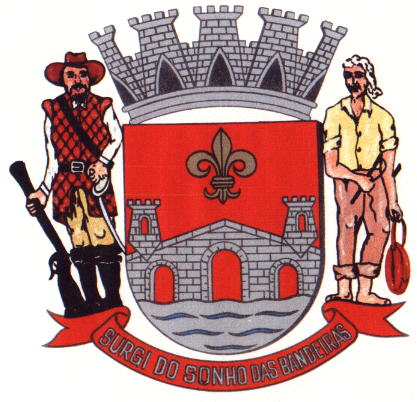
- Flag Coat of arms

- Location in São Paulo state

- Location in Brazil
- Coordinates: 22°47′23″S 48°7′40″W
- Country: Brazil
- Region: Southeast
- State: São Paulo

Area
  - Total: 737 km^{2} (285 sq mi)

Population (2020)
  - Total: 6,819
  - Density: 9.25/km^{2} (24.0/sq mi)
- Time zone: UTC−3 (BRT)

Anhembi is a Brazilian municipality in the state of São Paulo. The population is 6,819 (2020 est.) in an area of 737 km^{2}.

== History ==
The municipality was created by state law in 1948.

Map of the state of São Paulo (1948).

== Demographics ==
Historical population (municipality)
Year	Population	%±
1920	4,317
1940	4,548	5.4%
1950	5,119	12.6%
1960	3,135	−38.8%
1970	3,517	12.2%
1980	3,458	−1.7%
1991	3,537	2.3%
2000	4,535	28.2%
2010	5,653	24.7%
2022	5,674	0.4%

== Geography ==
The municipality contains the 293 hectares (720 acres) Barreiro Rico Ecological Station, created in 2006 to protect an area of Atlantic Forest and its primate population.

== Media ==
In telecommunications, the city was served by Companhia de Telecomunicações do Estado de São Paulo until 1973, when it began to be served by Telecomunicações de São Paulo. In July 1998, this company was acquired by Telefónica, which adopted the Vivo brand in 2012.

The company is currently an operator of cell phones, fixed lines, internet (fiber optics/4G) and television (satellite and cable).

== See also ==
- List of municipalities in São Paulo

== Sources ==
- Claudio Lembo (19 December 2006), Decreto nº 51.381, de 19 de Dezembro de 2006 (in Portuguese)
