= Barreiro Rico Ecological Station =

- Estação Ecológica do Barreiro Rico
- IUCN category Ia (strict nature reserve)
- Location within Brazil
- Nearest city: Anhembi, São Paulo
- Coordinates: 22.677283°S 48.148454°W
- Area: 292.82 hectares (723.6 acres)
- Designation: Ecological station
- Created: 19 December 2006
- Administrator: FF/SP

The Barreiro Rico Ecological Station (Portuguese: Estação Ecológica do Barreiro Rico) is a state-level ecological station (ESEC) in the state of São Paulo, Brazil.

== Location ==
The Barreiro Rico Ecological Station is in the municipality of Anhembi, São Paulo. It has an area of 292.82 hectares (723.6 acres). The ESEC is classified as IUCN protected area category Ia (strict nature reserve). It is administered by the Fundação para Conservação e a Produção Florestal do Estado de São Paulo. The ESEC is part of a forest block of 1,451 hectares (3,590 acres).

== History ==
The Barreiro Rico Ecological Station was created by decree 51.381 of 19 December 2006 by Cláudio Lembo, governor of São Paulo state. The purpose was to protect a remaining fragment of Atlantic Forest and its primate population.

== Environment ==
The climate is Köppen type Cwa, with a rainy season from September to March and a dry season from April to August. Altitude varies from 500 to 580 metres (1,640 to 1,900 ft) above sea level. The forest block contains fragments of semi-deciduous submontane vegetation. There is a closed enclave of cerrado of about 5 hectares (12 acres) in the southeast of the forest block. The ESEC was created to try to preserve this enclave and the surrounding forest. Thirty species of medium and large mammals have been recorded, including seven that are threatened in São Paulo.

== Sources ==
- Claudio Lembo (19 December 2006), Decreto nº 51.381, de 19 de Dezembro de 2006 (in Portuguese)
- EE do Barreiro Rico (in Portuguese), WWF Brasil, archived from the original on 2016-08-16
- "Município de Anhembi", Cidade-Brasil (in Portuguese)
- Zamorano Antunes, Alexsander; Rapp de Eston, Marilda (December 2009), "Mamíferos (chordata: mammalia) florestais de médio e grande porte registrados em barreiro rico, anhembi, estado de são paulo" (PDF), Rev. Inst. Flor. (in Portuguese), 21 (2), São Paulo: 201–215
