= Tupinambás Ecological Station =

Marine ecological station in São Paulo State, Brazil

- Estação Ecológica Tupinambás
- IUCN category Ia (strict nature reserve)
- Location within Brazil
- Nearest city: Guarujá, São Paulo
- Coordinates: 24.08°S 45.73°W
- Area: 2,464 hectares (6,090 acres)
- Designation: Ecological station
- Created: 20 July 1987

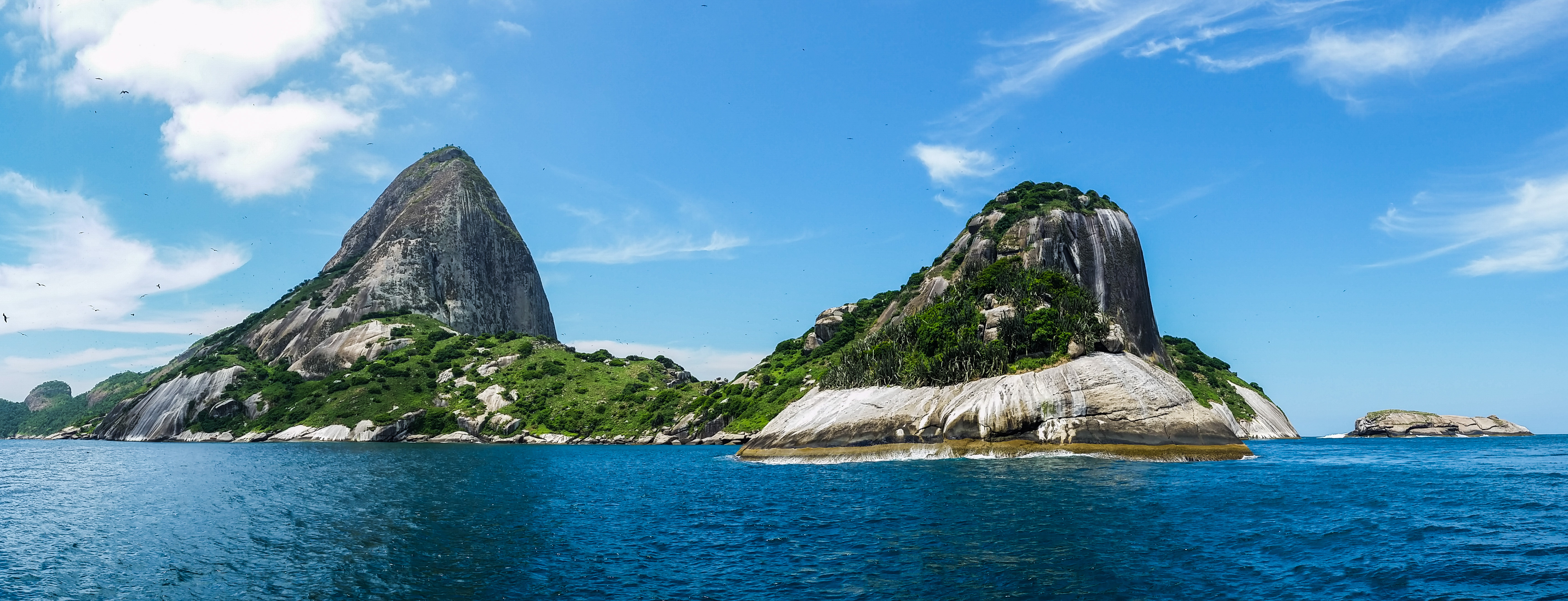

Tupinambás Ecological Station (Portuguese: Estação Ecológica Tupinambás) is a marine ecological station in and around the Alcatrazes archipelago off the coast in São Paulo State, Brazil.

== History ==
The Tupinambás Ecological Station is a Federal conservation area covering 2,464 hectares (6,090 acres) administered by the Chico Mendes Institute for Biodiversity Conservation. It was created on 20 July 1987. It consists of the Paredão island between about 24°04' and 24°05' S and 45°43' and 45°44' W, the islets of Abatipossanga, Guaratingaçu, Carimacuí and Cunhambebe between about 24°06' and 24°07' S and 45°42' and 45°43' W, and other islets and rocks, and the sea within a radius of 1 kilometre (0.62 mi) from their surf. It is in the São Sebastião and Ubatuba municipalities of São Paulo State.

== Status ==
As of 2009 the Ecological Station was a "strict nature reserve" under IUCN protected area category Ia. Migratory species include royal tern (Sterna maxima), spotted sandpiper (Actitis macularia), South American tern (Sterna hirundinacea), white-rumped sandpiper (Calidris fuscicollis), Cape petrel (Daption capense), wandering albatross (Diomedea exulans), Wilson's storm petrel (Oceanites oceanicus), Magellanic penguin (Spheniscus magellanicus), orange-breasted falcon (Falco deiroleucus), ultramarine grosbeak (Passerina brissonii), peregrine falcon (Falco peregrinus), great shearwater (Puffinus gravis), black-browed albatross (Thalassarche melanophris), humpback whale (Megaptera novaeangliae), Bryde's whale (Balaenoptera brydei), common minke whale (Balaenoptera acutorostrata), Atlantic yellow-nosed albatross (Thalassarche chlororhynchos) and giant oceanic manta ray (Manta birostris).

Endemic critically endangered land species include the pit viper Bothrops alcatraz and the frogs Cycloramphus faustoi and Scinax alcatraz.

== Sources ==
- Esec Tupinambás (in Portuguese), Chico Mendes Institute for Biodiversity Conservation
- Triana, Elisa (29 May 2009), "Strict Nature Reserves in Brazil", The Encyclopedia of Earth
- Unidade de Conservação: Estação Ecológica Tupinambás (in Portuguese), MMA: Ministério do Meio Ambiente
