= Uruçui-Una Ecological Station =

Ecological station in the state of Piauí, Brazil

- Estação Ecológica de Uruçuí-Una
- IUCN category Ia (strict nature reserve)
- Location within Brazil
- Coordinates: 8.858°S 45.202°W
- Area: 135,120 hectares (333,900 acres)
- Designation: ecological station
- Created: 2 June 1981

Uruçui-Una Ecological Station (Portuguese: Estação Ecológica de Uruçuí-Una) is an ecological station in the state of Piauí, Brazil.

== Location ==
The Ecological Station, which has an area of 135,120 hectares (333,900 acres), was established on 2 June 1981. It is administered by the Chico Mendes Institute for Biodiversity Conservation. It covers all or part of the municipalities of Bom Jesus, Santa Filomena and Baixa Grande do Ribeiro in the state of Piauí.

== Environment ==
The station has a warm, humid sub-tropical climate, with temperatures ranging from 20 to 34 °C (68 to 93 °F). The area is one of large sandstone plateaus cut by the valleys of perennial or intermittent rivers. The top of the plateaus is covered by typical cerrado vegetation, while there is gallery forest in the valleys. Fauna is very varied, and includes species such as maned wolf (Chrysocyon brachyurus), pampas deer (Ozotoceros bezoarticus), giant anteater (Myrmecophaga tridactyla), bearded bellbird (Procnias averano), hyacinth macaw (Anodorhynchus hyacinthinus), golden parakeet (Guaruba guarouba), armadillo and peccary.

== Conservation ==
The Ecological Station is a "strict nature reserve" under IUCN protected area category Ia. The purpose is to conserve nature and support scientific research. Specific objectives are to protect samples of cerrado ecosystems, springs, streams and rivers forming the Gurgueia and Parnaíba Basins. The station is threatened since it is located of the edge of the expanding grain-growing region.

== Sources ==
- Estação Ecológica de Uruçuí-Una (in Portuguese), Chico Mendes Institute for Biodiversity Conservation
- Unidade de Conservação: Estação Ecológica de Uruçuí-Una (in Portuguese), MMA: Ministério do Meio Ambiente
