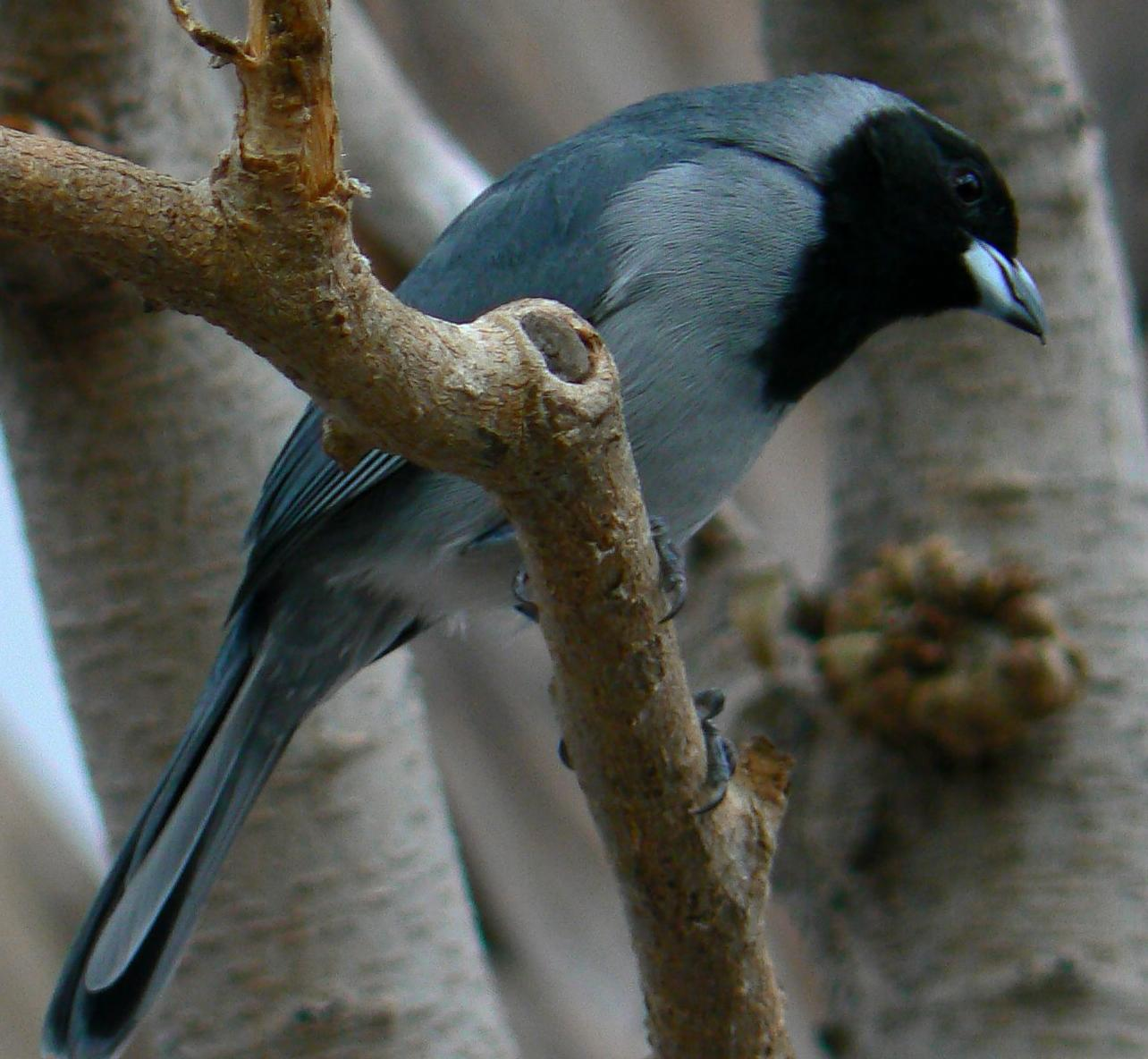
- Black-faced tanager (S. melanopis)

Scientific classification
- Kingdom: Animalia
- Phylum: Chordata
- Class: Aves
- Order: Passeriformes
- Family: Thraupidae
- Genus: Schistochlamys; Reichenbach, 1850

Type species
- Tanagara capistrata Wied-Neuwied, 1821

Species
- See text

= Schistochlamys =

Genus of birds

Schistochlamys is a genus of Neotropical birds in the tanager family Thraupidae.

== Taxonomy and species list ==
The genus Schistochlamys was introduced in 1850 by the German naturalist Ludwig Reichenbach. The type species is a subspecies of the cinnamon tanager with the trinomial Schistochlamys ruficapillus capistrata. The genus name combines the Late Latin schistus meaning "slate" and the Ancient Greek khlamus meaning "mantle" or "cloak".

The genus contains the following two species:

Image	Scientific name	Common name	Distribution
	Schistochlamys ruficapillus	Cinnamon tanager	Argentina, Brazil, and Paraguay.
	Schistochlamys melanopis	Black-faced tanager	Bolivia, Brazil, Colombia, Ecuador, French Guiana, Guyana, Paraguay, Peru, Suriname, and Venezuela.
