= Bom Jesus, Piauí =

Coordinates: 9.07389°S 44.3589°W

Bom Jesus
- Municipality
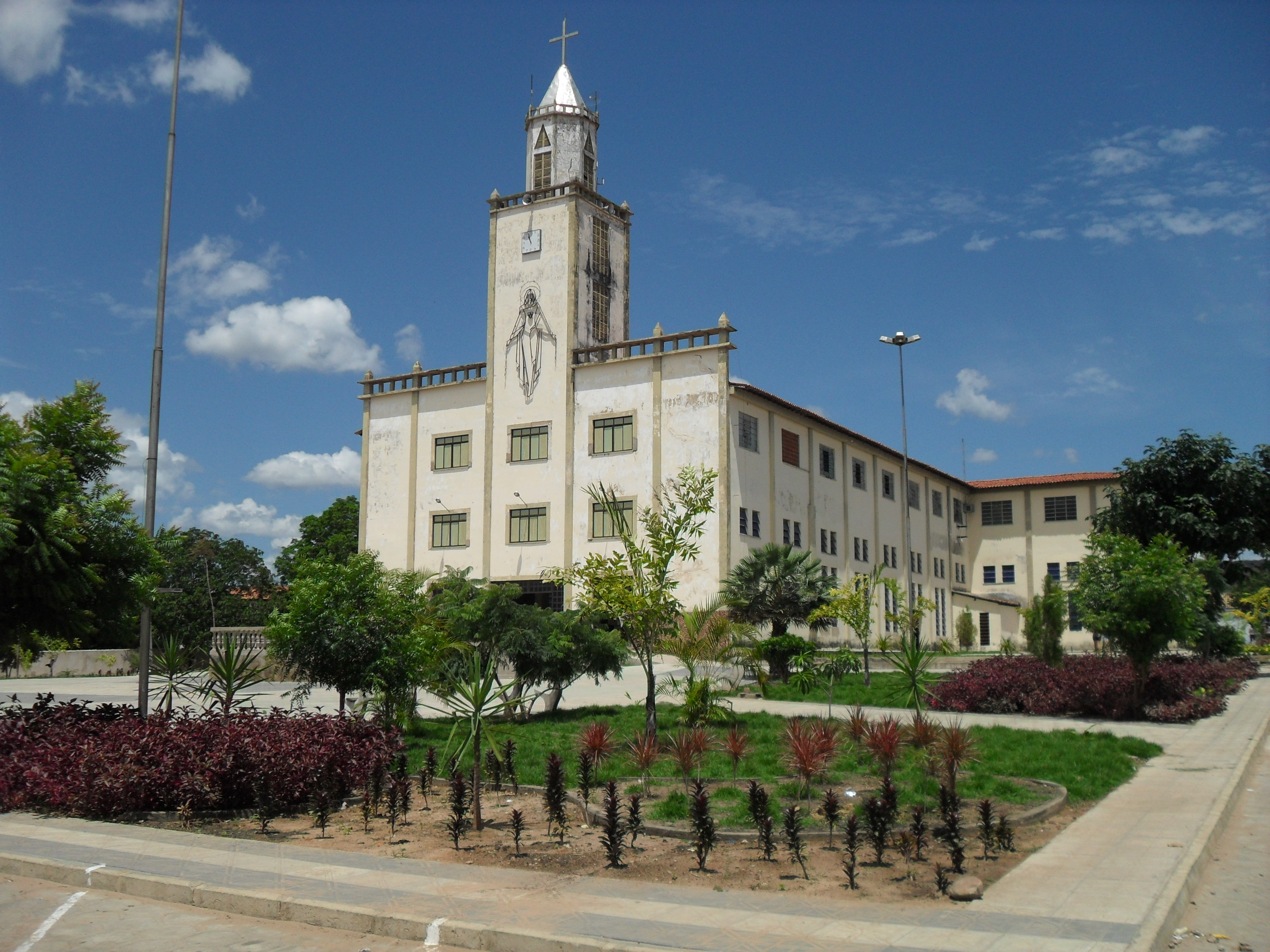

- Flag Coat of arms

- Location in Piauí
- Country: Brazil
- Region: Nordeste
- State: Piauí
- Mesoregion: Sudoeste Piauiense

Population (2020)
  - Total: 25,387
- Time zone: UTC−3 (BRT)

Bom Jesus is a municipality in the state of Piauí in the Northeast region of Brazil.

The municipality contains part of the 823,843 hectares (2,035,760 acres) Serra das Confusões National Park, created in 1998, which protects an area of the Caatinga biome.

== Name ==
Bom Jesus means "Good Jesus" in Portuguese.

== Geography and climate ==
Bom Jesus has a rather dry tropical savanna climate (Köppen Aw). It received national recognition in November 21, 2005 when it was measured the temperature of 44.7 °C (112.4 °F) in the town, the highest ever officially recorded in Brazil until November 2023.

The municipality contains part of the Uruçui-Una Ecological Station.

Climate data for Bom Jesus, Piauí (1981–2010)
Month	Jan	Feb	Mar	Apr	May	Jun	Jul	Aug	Sep	Oct	Nov	Dec	Year
Record high °C (°F)	44.6 (112.3)	43.2 (109.8)	42.6 (108.7)	39.2 (102.6)	39.7 (103.5)	40.2 (104.4)	40.2 (104.4)	41.3 (106.3)	42.5 (108.5)	42.5 (108.5)	44.7 (112.5)	43.2 (109.8)	44.7 (112.5)
Mean daily maximum °C (°F)	32.7 (90.9)	32.7 (90.9)	32.3 (90.1)	32.6 (90.7)	33.4 (92.1)	33.7 (92.7)	34.0 (93.2)	34.9 (94.8)	36.2 (97.2)	35.8 (96.4)	34.5 (94.1)	33.4 (92.1)	33.9 (93.0)
Daily mean °C (°F)	27.0 (80.6)	27.0 (80.6)	26.7 (80.1)	27.1 (80.8)	27.1 (80.8)	27.2 (81.0)	27.3 (81.1)	28.3 (82.9)	29.6 (85.3)	29.4 (84.9)	28.2 (82.8)	27.6 (81.7)	27.7 (81.9)
Mean daily minimum °C (°F)	20.2 (68.4)	20.1 (68.2)	19.9 (67.8)	20.1 (68.2)	19.7 (67.5)	19.2 (66.6)	19.2 (66.6)	20.0 (68.0)	21.2 (70.2)	21.2 (70.2)	20.5 (68.9)	20.2 (68.4)	20.1 (68.2)
Record low °C (°F)	18.6 (65.5)	18.0 (64.4)	15.7 (60.3)	16.7 (62.1)	15.1 (59.2)	12.7 (54.9)	12.7 (54.9)	12.9 (55.2)	16.3 (61.3)	18.2 (64.8)	18.6 (65.5)	17.1 (62.8)	12.7 (54.9)
Average precipitation mm (inches)	159.3 (6.27)	149.8 (5.90)	172.9 (6.81)	112.3 (4.42)	29.2 (1.15)	1.6 (0.06)	0.0 (0.0)	1.5 (0.06)	19.2 (0.76)	71.1 (2.80)	114.5 (4.51)	155.3 (6.11)	986.7 (38.85)
Average precipitation days (≥ 1.0 mm)	11	11	13	8	3	0	0	0	1	5	8	10	70
Average relative humidity (%)	63.9	64.9	64.4	61.9	58.2	52.1	48.8	44.2	43.9	46.6	56.5	59.6	55.4
Mean monthly sunshine hours	176.5	154.1	169.5	210.8	258.9	273.9	294.9	301.4	261.9	235.6	193.0	180.5	2,711
Source: Instituto Nacional de Meteorologia

== See also ==
- List of municipalities in Piauí
