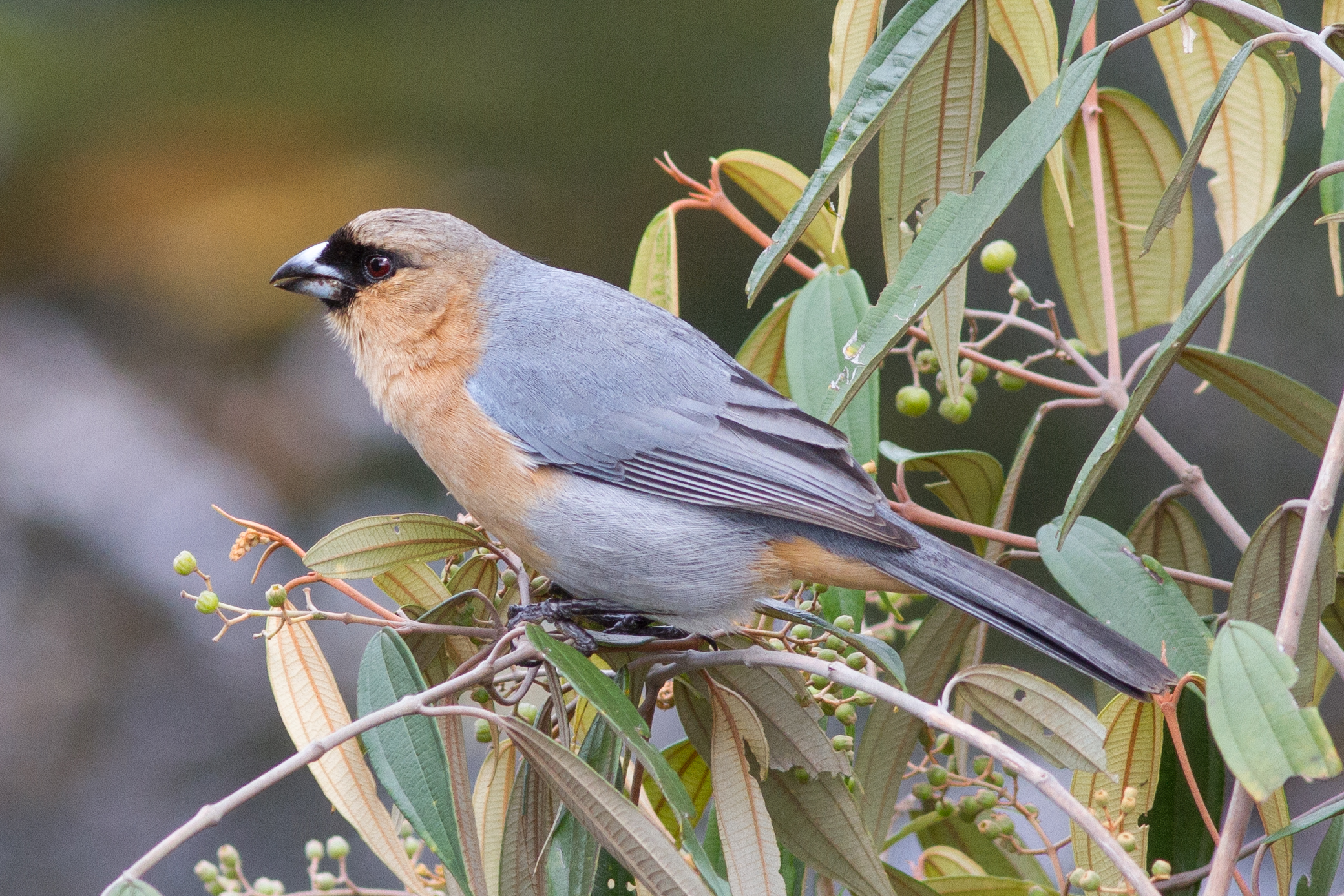
- Cinnamon tanager in Serra da Canastra National Park, Minas Gerais, Brazil

Conservation status
- Least Concern (IUCN 3.1)

Scientific classification
- Kingdom: Animalia
- Phylum: Chordata
- Class: Aves
- Order: Passeriformes
- Family: Thraupidae
- Genus: Schistochlamys
- Species: S. ruficapillus

Binomial name
- Schistochlamys ruficapillus (Vieillot, 1817)

= Cinnamon tanager =

Species of bird

The cinnamon tanager (Schistochlamys ruficapillus) is a species of bird in the family Thraupidae. It is found in Argentina, Brazil, and Paraguay. Its natural habitats are subtropical or tropical dry forests, dry savanna, subtropical or tropical dry shrubland, and heavily degraded former forest.
