= Ecological station (Brazil) =

Type of protected area in Brazil

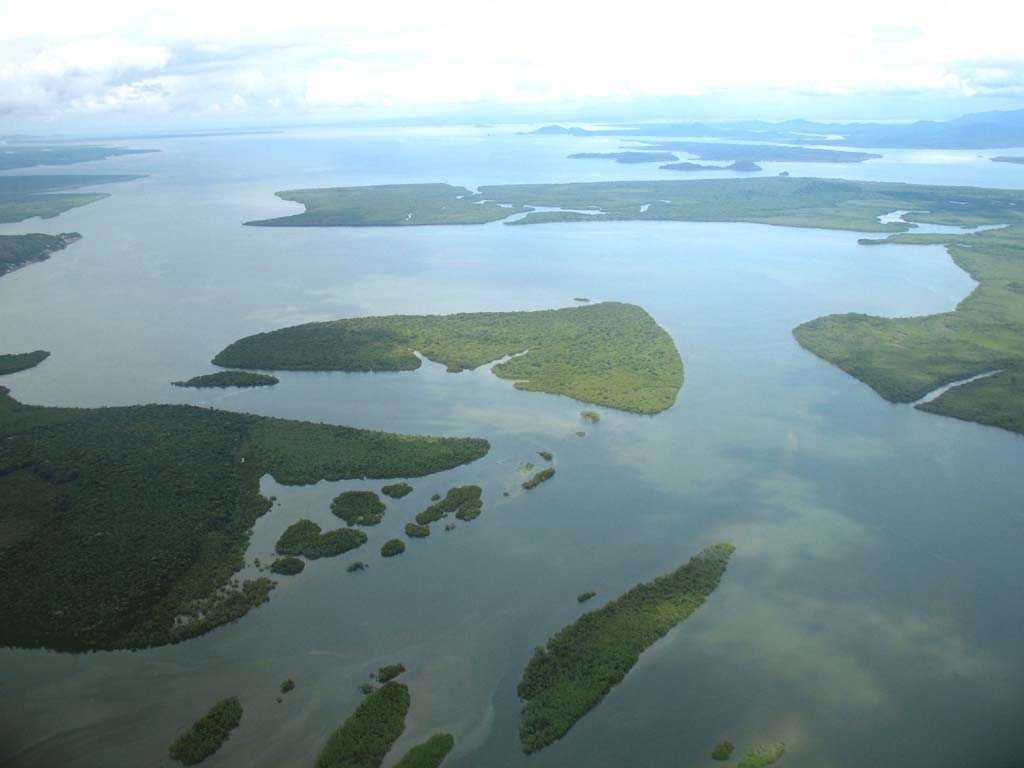
Ilha do Sambaqui. Guaraqueçaba Bay

An ecological station (Portuguese: Estação Ecológica) in Brazil is a type of protected area of Brazil as defined by the National System of Conservation Units (SNUC). The purpose is to preserve untouched representative samples of the different biomes in Brazil.

== Objectives and restrictions ==
In the 1970s the Special Secretariat of the Environment under the environmentalist Paulo Nogueira Neto launched a program of estações ecológicas (ecological stations) with the aim of establishing a network of reserves that would protect representative samples of all Brazilian ecosystems. The objective of an ecological station is to preserve nature and conduct scientific research. It establishes the right of eminent domain, with the private areas included in its boundaries requiring expropriation. In these areas, public visitation is prohibited, except for educational purposes, in accordance with the provisions of the Management Plan of the unit or specific regulation, and scientific research depends on previous authorization from the body responsible for the administration of the unit and is subject to the conditions and restrictions established by this body.

Changes to the environment in an ecological station are allowed to restore modified ecosystems, to manage species so as to preserve biodiversity and to collect specimens for scientific purposes. Changes are also allowed to conduct scientific research that affects the environment more than observation or collection, but in no more 1,500 hectares (3,700 acres) or than or a maximum of 3% of the total area of the ecological station, whichever is smaller.

== Selected list of ecological stations ==
Name	State	Area (ha)	Level	Created	Biome
Acauã	Minas Gerais	3,195	State	1974	Atlantic Forest
Águas do Cuiabá	Mato Grosso	11,328	State	2002	Cerrado
Águas Emendadas	Federal District	9,181	State	1968	Cerrado
Aiuaba	Ceará	11,525	Federal	2001	Caatinga
Alto Maués	Amazonas	668,160	Federal	2014	Amazon
Angatuba	São Paulo	1,394	State	1985	Atlantic Forest
Aracuri-Esmeralda	Rio Grande do Sul	277	Federal	1981	Atlantic Forest
Bananal	São Paulo	884	State	1987	Atlantic Forest
Banhados de Iguape	São Paulo	16,588	State	2006	Atlantic Forest
Barreiro Rico	São Paulo	293	State	2006	Atlantic Forest
Caetetus	São Paulo	2,254	State	1977	Atlantic Forest
Caracaraí	Roraima	86,793	Federal	1982	Amazon
Carijós	Santa Catarina	759	Federal	1987	Coastal Marine
Castanhão	Ceará	12,579	Federal	2001	Caatinga
Chauás	São Paulo	2,700	State	1987	Atlantic Forest
Cuniã	Rondônia / Amazonas	189,661	Federal	2001	Amazon
Grão-Pará	Pará	4,245,819	State	2006	Amazon
Guanabara	Rio de Janeiro	1,935	Federal	2006	Coastal marine
Guaraqueçaba	Paraná	4,476	Federal	1982	Coastal Marine
Guaxindiba	Rio de Janeiro	3,160	State	2002	Atlantic Forest
Ilha do Mel	Paraná	2,241	State	1982	Coastal Marine
Iquê	Mato Grosso	215,969	Federal	1981	Amazon
Itirapina	São Paulo	5,512	State	1984	Atlantic Forest
Jari	Amapá, Pará	227,126	Federal	1982	Amazon
Jataí	São Paulo	9,010	State	1982	Cerrado
Juami-Japurá	Amazonas	831,524	Federal	1985	Amazon
Jutaí-Solimões	Amazonas	284,285	Federal	1983	Amazon
Juréia-Itatins	São Paulo	208,505	State	1986	Atlantic Forest
Maracá	Roraima	103,976	Federal	1981	Amazon
Maracá-Jipioca	Amapá	60,200	Federal	1981	Amazon
Mata do Jacaré	São Paulo	75	State	1987	Atlantic Forest
Mata dos Ausentes	Minas Gerais	498	State	1974	Atlantic Forest
Mata Preta	Santa Catarina	6,566	Federal	2005	Atlantic Forest
Mico Leão Preto	São Paulo	5,500	Federal	2002	Atlantic Forest
Mujica Nava	Rondônia	18,281	State	1996	Amazon
Murici	Alagoas	6,132	Federal	2001	Atlantic Forest
Niquiá	Roraima	284,787	Federal	1985	Amazon
Paraíso	Rio de Janeiro	5,000	State	1987	Atlantic Forest
Pau-Brasil	Bahia	1,151	State	1997	Atlantic Forest
Pau-Brasil	Paraíba	82	State	2002	Atlantic Forest
Pirapitinga	Minas Gerais	1,384	Federal	1987	Cerrado
Raso da Catarina	Bahia	105,300	Federal	1984	Caatinga
Rio Acre	Acre	77,500	Federal	1981	Amazon
Rio da Casca	Mato Grosso	3,534	State	1994	Amazon
Rio Flor do Prado	Mato Grosso	8,517	State	2003	Amazon
Rio Madeirinha	Mato Grosso	13,683	State	1997	Amazon
Rio Ronuro	Mato Grosso	102,000	State	1998	Amazon
Rio Roosevelt	Mato Grosso	96,925	State	2007	Amazon
Samuel	Rondônia	71,061	State	1989	Amazon
Seridó	Rio Grande do Norte	1,163	Federal	1982	Caatinga
Serra das Araras	Mato Grosso	28,637	Federal	1982	Amazon
Serra dos Três Irmãos	Rondônia	87,412	State	1990	Amazon
Serra Geral do Tocantins	Bahia, Tocantins	716,306	Federal	2001	Amazon
Taiamã	Mato Grosso	11,555	Federal	1981	Amazon
Taim	Rio Grande do Sul	10,939	Federal	1986	Coastal Marine
Tamoios	Rio de Janeiro	9,361	Federal	1990	Coastal Marine
Terra do Meio	Pará	3,373,110	Federal	2005	Amazon
Tupinambás	São Paulo	2,464	Federal	1987	Coastal Marine
Tupiniquins	São Paulo	1,728	Federal	1986	Coastal Marine
UFMG	Minas Gerais	114	Federal	1988	Cerrado
Uruçui-Una	Piauí	135,120	Federal	1981	Cerrado
Wenceslau Guimarães	Bahia	2,418.00	State	1997	Atlantic Forest
Xitué Ecological Station	São Paulo	3,095	State	1987	Atlantic Forest

== Sources ==
- Ecological Station, ISA: Instituto Socioambiental, archived from the original on 2016-05-05
- Estação Ecológica de Taiamã: História (in Portuguese), ICMBio, archived from the original on 2016-06-10
- Figueiredo, João; Andreazza, Mário David (27 April 1981), Lei No 6.902, de 27 de Abril de 1981 (PDF) (in Portuguese), Brazil, archived from the original (PDF) on 4 March 2016
- "Juréia-Itatins Ecological Station", jureia.com (in Portuguese), archived from the original on 2016-06-02
