= Ribeirão Grande =

- Municipality
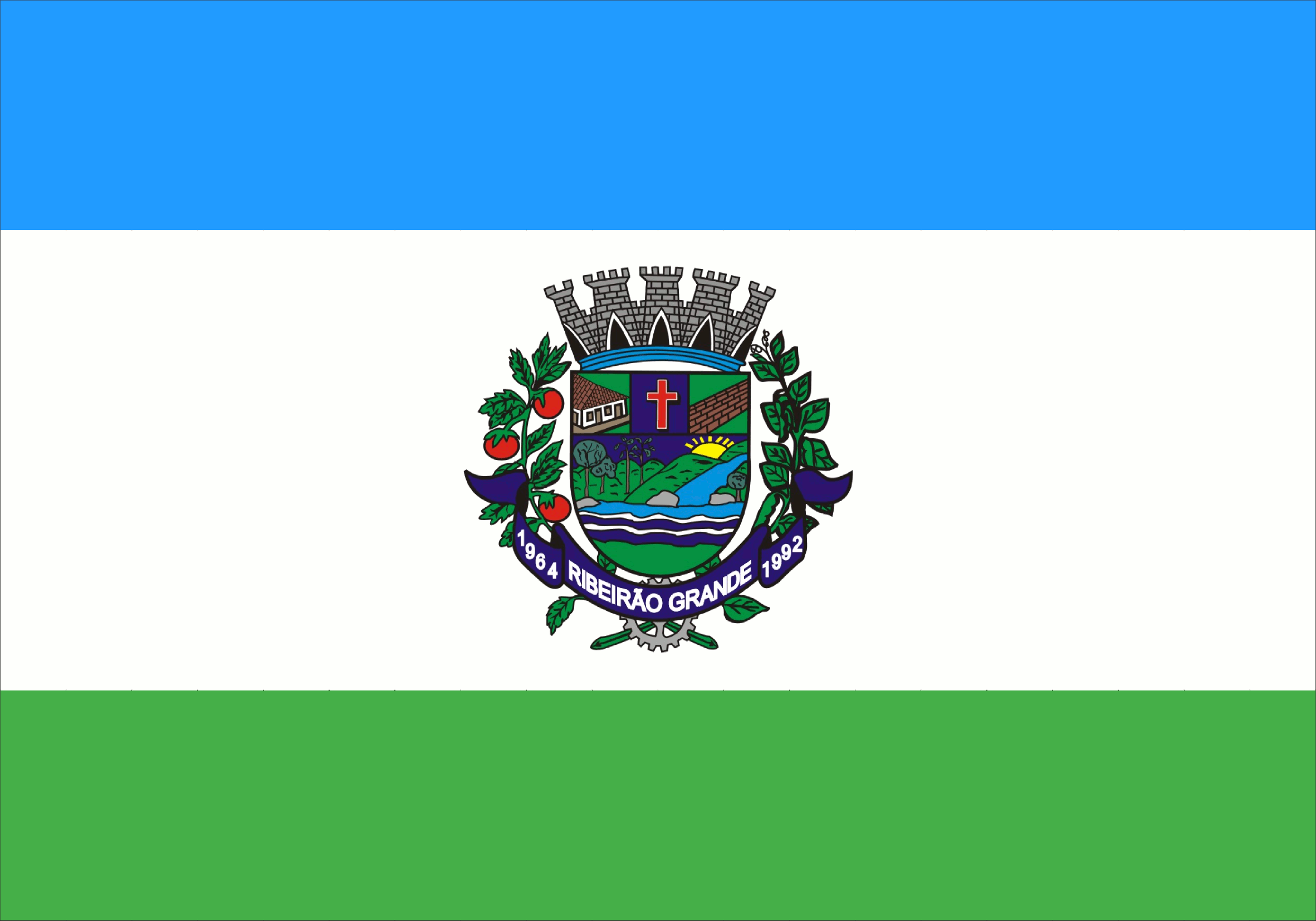
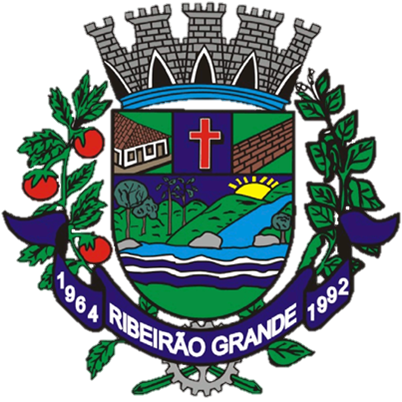
- Flag Coat of arms

- Location in São Paulo state

- Location in Brazil
- Coordinates: 24°5′57″S 48°21′55″W
- Country: Brazil
- Region: Southeast
- State: São Paulo

Government
  - Mayor: Eliana Santos (PSDB)

Area
  - Total: 333 km^{2} (129 sq mi)

Population (2020)
  - Total: 7,679
  - Density: 23.1/km^{2} (59.7/sq mi)
- Time zone: UTC−3 (BRT)
- Website: http://www.ribeiraogrande.sp.gov.br/

Ribeirão Grande is a municipality in the state of São Paulo in Brazil. The population is 7,679 (2020 est.) in an area of 333 km^{2}. The elevation is 690 m.

The municipality contains part of the 488,865-hectare (1,208,010-acre) Serra do Mar Environmental Protection Area, created in 1984. It contains the 3,095-hectare (7,650-acre) Xitué Ecological Station, created in 1987. It contains part of the 41,704-hectare (103,050-acre) Intervales State Park, created in 1995, including the park's headquarters.

== Media ==
In telecommunications, the city was served by Telecomunicações de São Paulo. In July 1998, this company was acquired by Telefónica, which adopted the Vivo brand in 2012. The company is currently an operator of cell phones, fixed lines, internet (fiber optics/4G) and television (satellite and cable).

== See also ==
- List of municipalities in São Paulo
