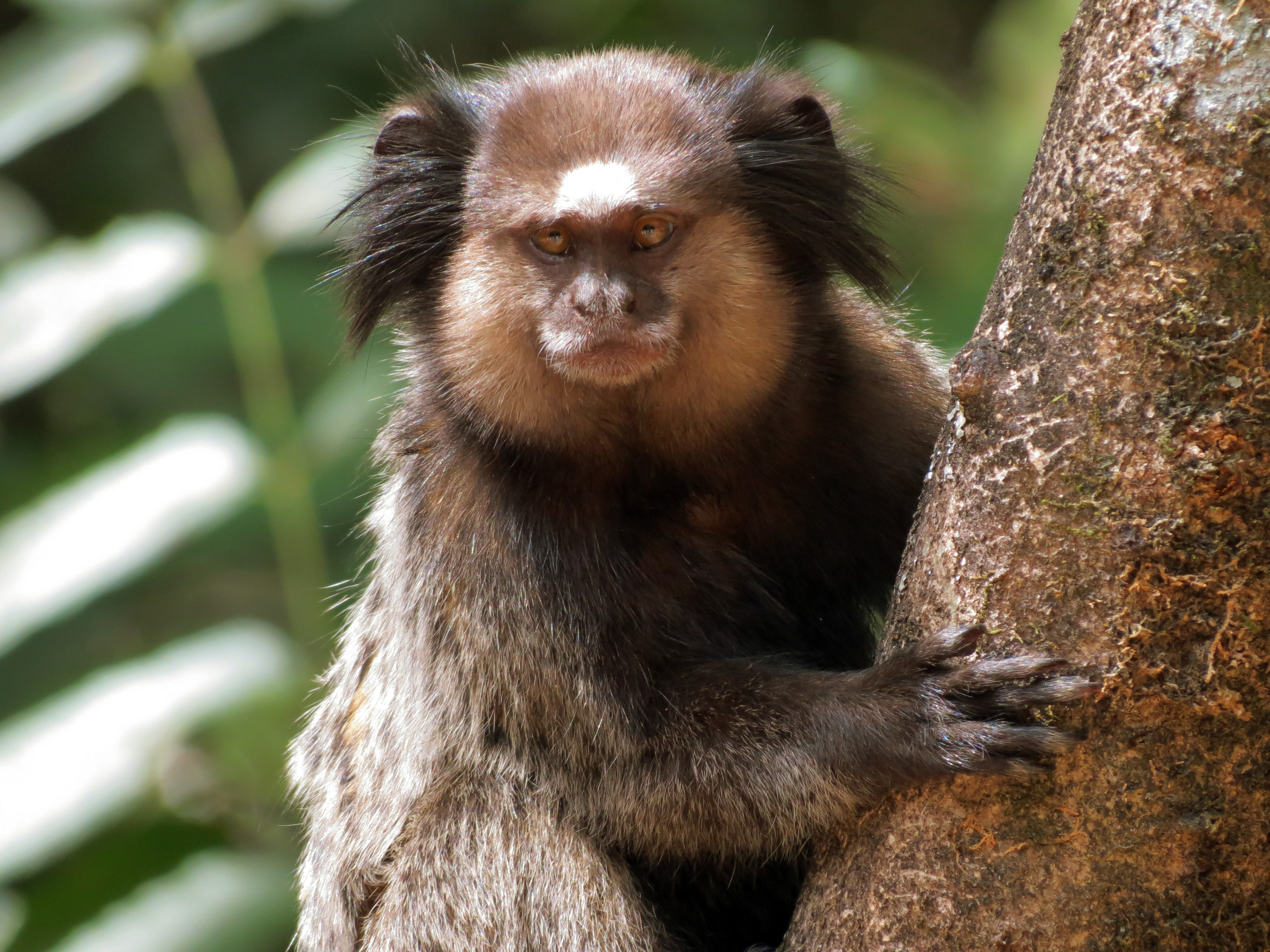
- At Belo Horizonte Zoo, Brazil

Conservation status
- Least Concern (IUCN 3.1)

Scientific classification
- Kingdom: Animalia
- Phylum: Chordata
- Class: Mammalia
- Order: Primates
- Family: Callitrichidae
- Genus: Callithrix
- Species: C. penicillata

Binomial name
- Callithrix penicillata (É. Geoffroy, 1812)
- Geographic range in Brazil

Synonyms
- C. jordani Thomas, 1904; C. melanotis Lesson, 1840; C. trigonifer Reichenbach, 1862

= Black-tufted marmoset =

Species of New World monkey

The black-tufted marmoset (Callithrix penicillata) is a species of New World monkey that lives primarily in the Neotropical gallery forests of the Brazilian Central Plateau. It ranges from Bahia to Paraná, and as far inland as Goiás, between 14°S and 25°S, and can commonly be seen in the Rio de Janeiro city where it was introduced. This marmoset typically resides in rainforests, living an arboreal life high in the trees, below the canopy. They are only rarely spotted near the ground.

== Physical description ==
The black-tufted marmoset is characterized by black tufts of hair around their ears. It typically has some sparse white hairs on its face. It usually has a brown or black head and its limbs and upper body are gray, as well as its abdomen, while its rump and underside are usually black. Its tail is ringed with black and white and is not prehensile, instead used for balance. It does not have an opposable thumb and its nails tend to have a claw-like appearance. The black-tufted marmoset reaches a size of 19.0 to 22.1 centimetres (7.48–8.7 in) and weighs up to 350 g (12.35 oz).

== Behavior ==
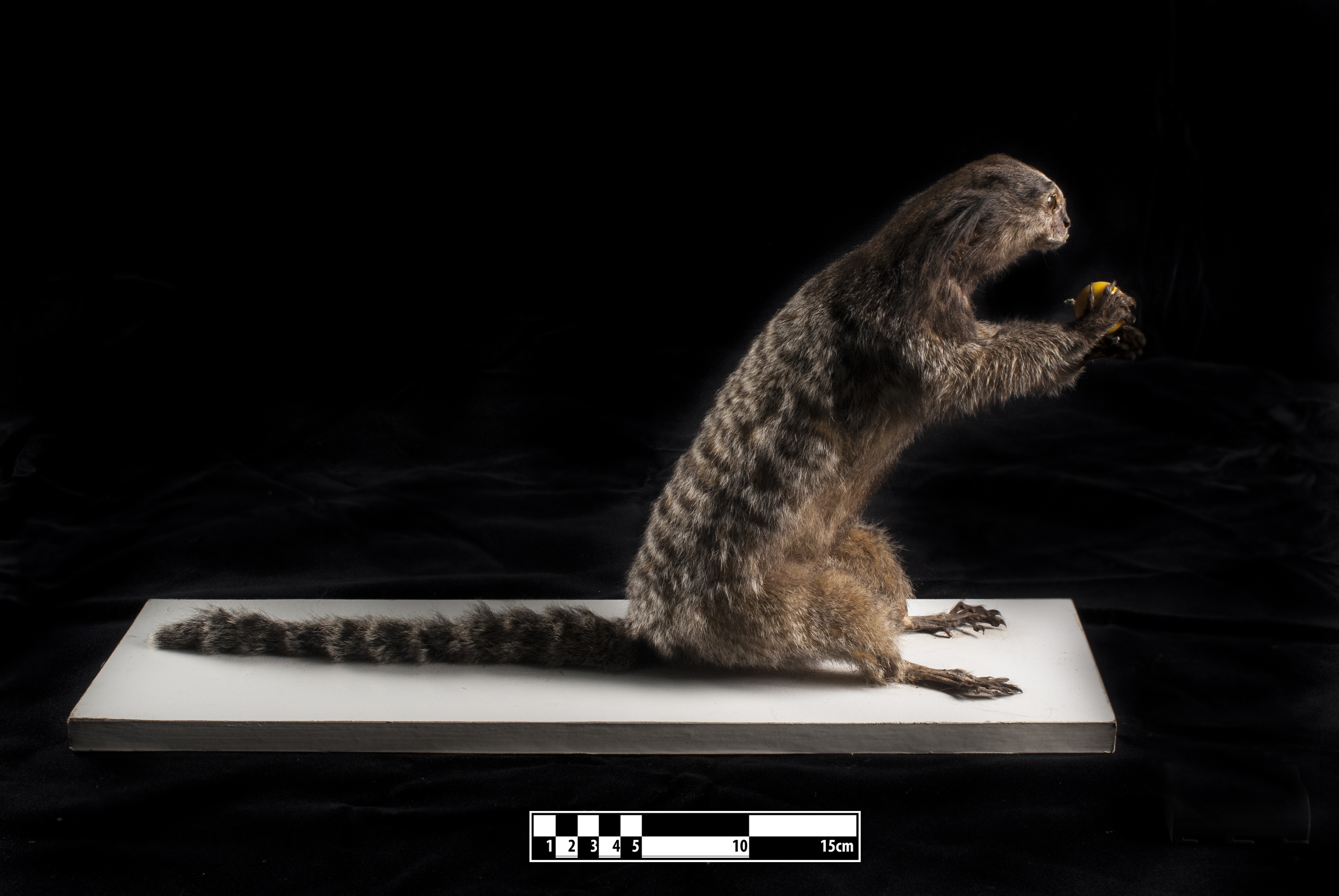
Marmoset taxidermy in the Museum of Veterinary Anatomy FMVZ USP

The black-tufted marmoset has a lifestyle very similar to other marmosets, being diurnal and arboreal. It typically lives in family groups of 2 to 14. The groups usually consist of a reproductive couple and their offspring. The males, as well as juvenile offspring, commonly assist the female in the raising of the young.

Though the black-tufted marmoset lives in small family groups, it is believed that they share their food source, sap trees, with other marmoset groups. Scent marking does occur within these groups, but it is believed that the marking is to deter other species rather than other black-tufted marmoset groups, because other groups typically ignore these markings. They also appear to be migratory, often moving in relation to the wet or dry seasons, however, the extent of their migration is unknown.

Though communication between black-tufted marmosets has not been studied thoroughly, it is believed that it communicates through vocalizations. It has known predator-specific cries and appears to vocalize frequently outside of predator cries.

== Food and predation ==
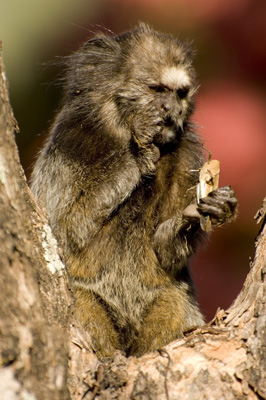
Black-tufted marmoset eating a cricket around Serra do Cipó National Park, Brazil

The black-tufted marmoset diet consists primarily of tree sap, which it obtains by nibbling the bark with its long lower incisors. In periods of drought, it will also include fruit and insects in its diet. In periods of serious drought, it has also been known to eat small arthropods, molluscs, bird eggs, baby birds and small vertebrates.

Large birds of prey are the greatest threat to the black-tufted marmoset, however, snakes and wild cats also pose a danger to them. Predator-specific vocalizations and visual scanning are its only anti-predation techniques.

== Reproduction ==
The black-tufted marmoset is monogamous and lives in family groups. It reproduces twice a year, producing 1 to 4 offspring, though most often just twins. Its gestation period is 150 days and offspring are weaned after 8 weeks. There is considerable parental investment by this species, with both parents, as well as older juveniles, helping to raise the young. The offspring are extremely dependent on their parents and though they are sexually mature at 18 months, they typically do not mate until much later, staying with their family group until they do.

== Ecosystem roles and conservation status ==
The black-tufted marmoset is a mutualist with many species of fruit trees because it distributes the seeds from the fruit it consumes throughout the forests. However, it is a parasite on other species of trees because it creates sores in trees in order to extract sap, while offering no apparent benefit to the trees. Though this marmoset is not a main food source to any specific species, it is a food source to a number of different species, specifically large birds of prey, wild cats, and snakes.

The black-tufted marmoset is listed as having no special status on the IUCN Red List or the United States Endangered Species Act List. It is listed in Appendix II of CITES and is not currently considered an endangered or threatened species. In Rio de Janeiro State, where it was introduced alongside the common marmoset, it is considered as an invasive species posing a danger to the survival of the endangered golden lion tamarin through competition. Management of the species in its invaded habitat has included proposals for sterilization of reproductive-age individuals, relocation, and public awareness campaign for prevention of further releases.
