= Minas Gerais =

State in Brazil

- State
- Flag Coat of arms
- Motto(s): Libertas quæ sera tamen (Latin) "Freedom albeit late"
- Anthem: Oh Minas gerais!
- Location in Brazil
- Coordinates: 19°46′56″S 43°57′5″W
- Country: Brazil
- Region: Southeast
- Capital and largest city: Belo Horizonte

Government
  - Type: Unitary state
  - Governor: Mateus Simões (PSD)
  - Vice Governor: Vacant
  - Senators: Carlos Viana (PSD); Cleitinho Azevedo (REP); Renzo Braz (PP)
  - Legislature: Legislative Assembly of Minas Gerais

Area
  - Total: 586,528.29 km^{2} (226,459.84 sq mi)
  - Rank: 4th

Population (2025)
  - Total: 21,393,441
  - Rank: 2nd
  - Density: 36.474696/km^{2} (94.469029/sq mi)
  - Rank: 14th
- Demonym: Mineiro/a

GDP (2024)
  - Total: R$1.065 trillion (US$197.627 billion)

HDI (2024)
  - Category: 0.809 – very high (9th)
- Time zone: UTC-3 (MGT)
- Postal Code: 30000-000 to 39990-000
- ISO 3166 code: BR-MG
- Website: www.mg.gov.br

Minas Gerais (English: /ˈmɪnəs ʒəˈraɪs/, MIN-əs zhə-RYS; Brazilian Portuguese: [ˈminɐz ʒeˈɾajs]; lit. 'General Mines') is one of the 27 federative units of Brazil, being the fourth largest state by area and the second largest in number of inhabitants with a population of 20,539,989 according to the 2022 census. Located in the Southeast Region of the country, it is bordered by São Paulo in the south and southwest; Mato Grosso do Sul to the west; Goiás and the Federal District to the northwest; Bahia to the north and northeast; Espírito Santo to the east; and Rio de Janeiro to the southeast. The state's capital and largest city, Belo Horizonte, is a major urban and finance center in Brazil, being the sixth most populous municipality in the country while its metropolitan area ranks as the third largest in Brazil with just over 5.8 million inhabitants, after those of São Paulo and Rio de Janeiro. Minas Gerais' territory is subdivided into 853 municipalities, the largest number among Brazilian states.

The state's terrain is quite rugged and some of Brazil's highest peaks are located in its territory. It is also home to the source of some of Brazil's main rivers, such as the São Francisco, Grande, Paranaíba, Doce and Jequitinhonha rivers, which places it in a strategic position with regard to the country's water resources. It has a tropical climate, which varies from colder and humid in the south to semi-arid in its northern portion. All of these combined factors provide it with a rich fauna and flora distributed in the biomes that cover the state, especially the Cerrado and the threatened Atlantic Forest.

Minas Gerais' territory was inhabited by indigenous peoples when the Portuguese arrived in Brazil. It experienced a large migration wave following the discovery of gold in the late 17th century. The mining of gold brought wealth and development to the then captaincy, providing its economic and cultural development; however, gold soon became scarce, causing the emigration of a large part of the population until a new cycle (that of coffee) once again brought Minas Gerais national prominence and whose end led to the relatively late industrialization process. Minas Gerais currently has the third largest GDP among Brazilian states, with a large part of it still being the product of mining activities. The state also has a notable infrastructure, with a large number of hydroelectric plants and the largest road network in the country. In politics, Minas Gerais's size makes it an important bellwether, having voted for the winning presidential candidate in every election since democracy returned to Brazil in the 1980s.

Due to its natural beauty and historical heritage, Minas Gerais is an important tourist destination. It is known for its heritage of colonial architecture and art in historical cities such as Ouro Preto and Diamantina, São João del-Rei, Mariana, Tiradentes, Congonhas, Sabará and Serro. In the south, its tourist points are hydro-mineral spas, such as the municipalities of Caxambu, Lambari, São Lourenço, Poços de Caldas, São Thomé das Letras, Monte Verde (a district of Camanducaia) and the national parks of Caparaó and Canastra. In the Serra do Cipó, Sete Lagoas, Cordisburgo and Lagoa Santa, the caves and waterfalls are the main attractions. The people of Minas Gerais also have a distinctive culture, marked by traditional religious festivals and typical countryside cuisine, in addition to national importance in contemporary artistic productions and also in the sports scene.

== Etymology ==
Two interpretations are given for the origin of the name Minas Gerais. The first interpretation is that the name simply means "General Mines", referring to a number of mines which were located in several areas of the region.

The second interpretation derives the name from the former name of the colonial province, "Minas dos Matos Gerais" ("Mines of the General Woods"), referring to two distinct regions encompassed by the state: the region of the mines (Minas), and the "general" region ("Matos Gerais" or "Campos Gerais", roughly meaning "General Fields"). The "general" region included the areas of sertão which were far from the mining areas.

== History ==
Part of the history of the current state of Minas Gerais was determined by the exploration of the great mineral wealth found in its territory. Mining began in the 17th century and to this day remains important to the state's economy.

=== Prehistory and indigenous peoples ===
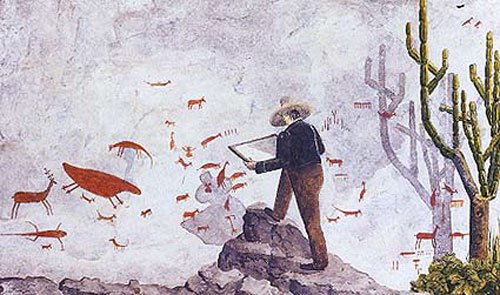
Lund copying rock paintings in a cave in Lagoa Santa, c. 1840

In the mid-19th century, Danish paleontologist Peter Wilhelm Lund discovered, in the Lagoa Santa region, human remains belonging to a population that lived there thousands of years ago, nicknamed the "Lagoa Santa People". The region of Minas Gerais was inhabited by indigenous peoples as long as 11,400 to 12,000 years ago, based on the estimated age of the Luzia woman, the name of the oldest human fossil found in the Americas. Luzia was found in 1974 in excavations in Lapa Vermelha, a cave between the municipalities of Lagoa Santa and Pedro Leopoldo, in the Metropolitan Region of Belo Horizonte.

Based on the analysis of Luzia and her people's cranial morphology, it was theorized that they had Australoid features, having belonged to a population that arrived in the Americas before the ancestors of Amerindians. However, with the analysis of the genetic material of the human remains of the Lagoa Santa People, it was found that this prehistoric population had completely Amerindian DNA, therefore ruling out any relationship with Australasian populations and the theory that the peopling of the Americas was due to a wave of individuals with Australoid traits and another of Mongoloid individuals. The indigenous peoples of Minas Gerais, as well as throughout Brazil and South America, are descendants of the groups who migrated there through North America.

In the region of the municipalities of Januária, Montalvânia, Itacarambi and Juvenília, in northern Minas Gerais, archaeological excavations have led to estimates that the initial settlement occurred at Luzia's time. Starting in this period, cultural characteristics emerged, such as the use of stone or bone, the creation of cemeteries and small grain silos, as well as cave paintings. Later, about four thousand years ago, it is speculated that vegetable cultivation occurred, in particular corn, and that two thousand years ago, ceramic products were already being manufactured.

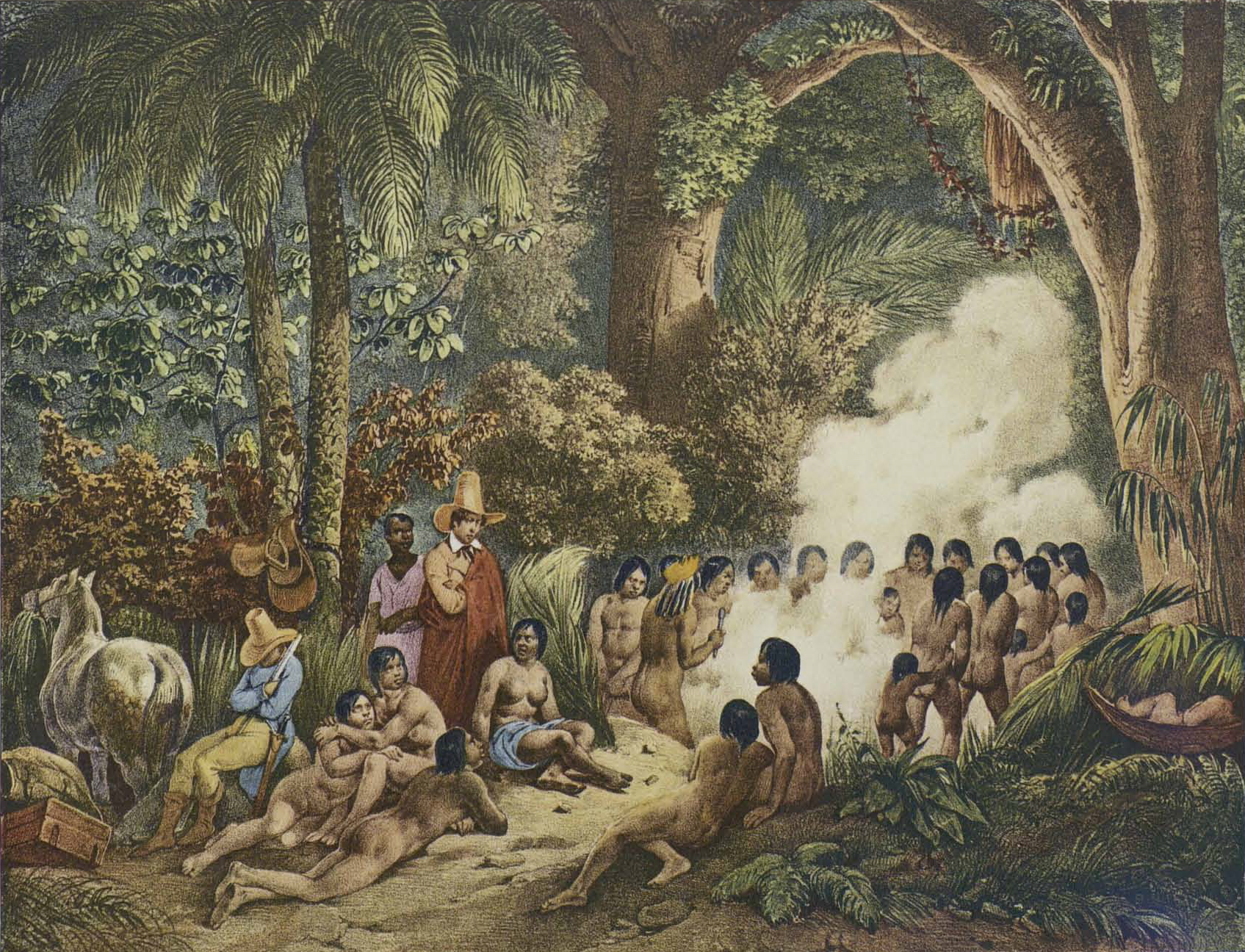
Tanz der Puris, by Johann Moritz Rugendas

More than a hundred indigenous groups inhabited the current territory of Minas Gerais at the time of the arrival of the Portuguese. In the valleys of the Doce, Jequitinhonha and Mucuri rivers, people generally known as "botocudos" lived, such as the Maxakalis, Maconis, Naquenuques, Aranãs, Krenaks and Pataxós. Northern Minas Gerais was dominated by the Kiriris and Xakriabás. Center, western and southern Minas Gerais were inhabited by the Cataguás, who were the most numerous indigenous group in Minas Gerais' territory in colonial times, so much so that the region was known as "Campos Gerais dos Cataguases" in the time of the bandeirantes. The regions of Triângulo Mineiro and Alto Paranaíba were inhabited by the Kayapos and Araxás, while the Zona da Mata was populated by the Puri. The region of Minas Gerais close to the border with São Paulo, Mato Grosso do Sul and Goiás was occupied by the Bororós.

However, during the first centuries of the colonization of Brazil, the indigenous people of this region were captured by the bandeirantes to be enslaved and the groups that revolted were exterminated, which caused a great reduction in the indigenous population, leaving currently only five groups: the Xakriabás, Krenaks, Maxakalis, Pataxós and Pankararus, the latter coming from Pernambuco's hinterlands.

=== Colonial era ===
==== Initial settlement and gold rush ====
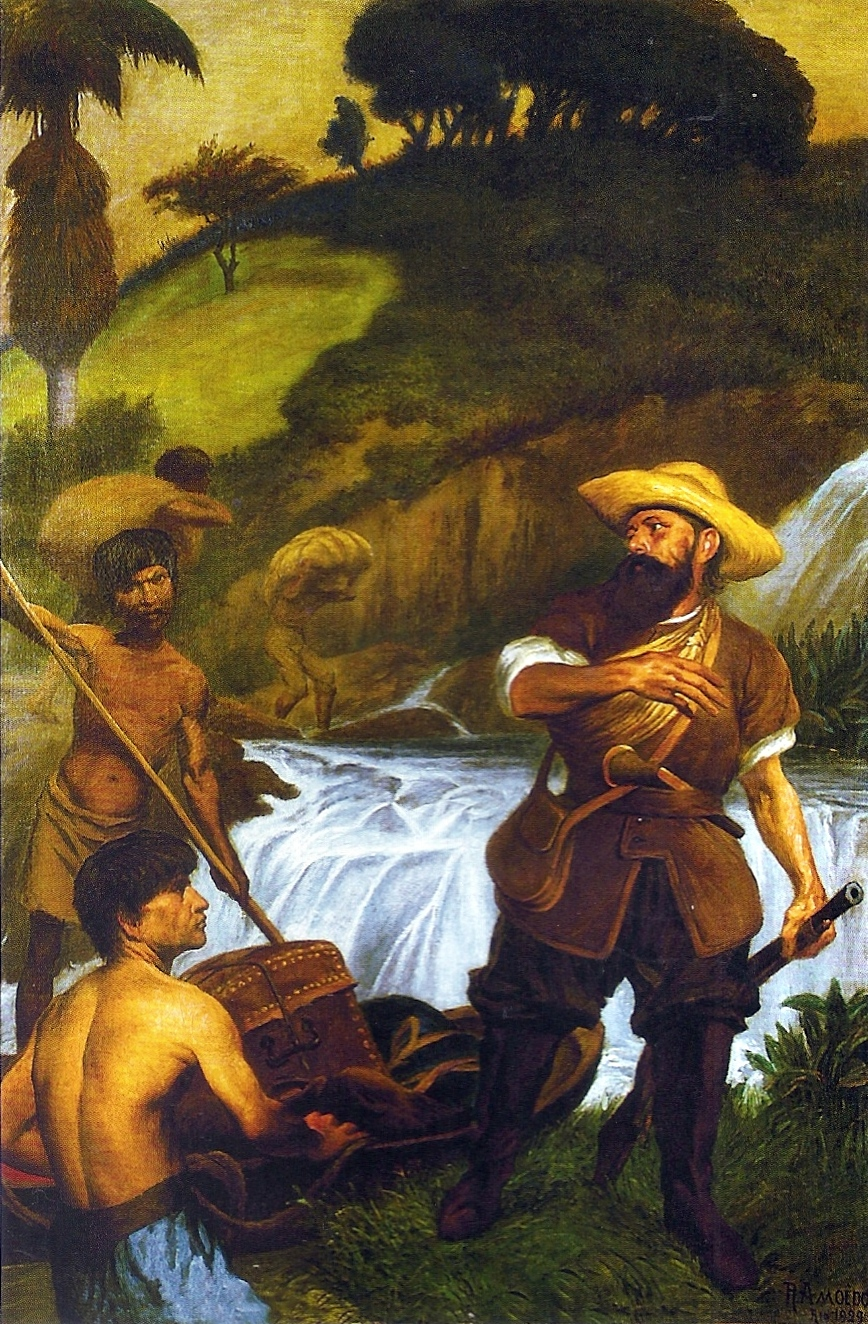
Borba Gato, painting by Rodolfo Amoedo, 1929

The first European penetration into the territory of present-day Minas Gerais occurred with an expedition led by the Spaniards Francisco Bruza Espinosa and João de Azpilcueta Navarro between 1553 and 1555; the group departed from the coast of Bahia and traversed the northern part of Minas Gerais. In the following decades, other expeditions—known as entradas—arriving from Brazil's northeastern coast, also explored this same region, such as the one led by Sebastião Fernandes Tourinho in 1573. Beginning in the late 16th century, bandeirantes from São Paulo traveled throughout the territory of Minas Gerais in search of gold and precious stones. Many of these expeditions were supported by the Portuguese Crown; notable among them was the expedition led by Fernão Dias and his son-in-law, Borba Gato, which departed from the village of São Paulo in 1674. During the 17th century, the colonization of northern Minas Gerais began, driven by the arrival of sertanejo cattle herders—following the expansion of livestock farming from the northeastern sertão—as well as bandeirantes in search of precious stones and Indigenous people to enslave.

Between 1692 and 1693, the bandeirante Antônio Rodrigues Arzão discovered the first gold deposits in the territory of Minas Gerais. In the following years, expeditions from the towns of São Paulo and Taubaté traversed the Rio das Velhas region in search of gold. In 1696, Salvador Fernandes Furtado discovered gold along the banks of the Rio do Carmo and established a camp there, which gave rise to the town of Nossa Senhora do Carmo (present-day Mariana). Two years later, Antônio Dias de Oliveira discovered the precious metal at the foot of Itacolomi Peak and founded a settlement there—the embryo of what would become Vila Rica (present-day Ouro Preto). In 1702, João de Siqueira Afonso discovered precious stones in the Rio das Mortes valley. Later, gold was also discovered in the Jequitinhonha Valley (in the areas of Serro and Minas Novas) and in the south (in Aiuruoca). Initially, gold was extracted from riverbeds, which forced prospectors to move on once the metal was depleted. Over time, exploration expanded to the slopes of mountains, necessitating permanent settlement by the miners and leading to the emergence of the first towns and villages.

News of the gold discovery spread quickly, and over the following decades, hundreds of thousands of people—eager for wealth—flocked to Minas Gerais. This group included many Portuguese (among them "New Christians") as well as colonial Brazilians from São Paulo, Bahia, Pernambuco, and Rio de Janeiro. The sudden arrival of such a large number of people led to epidemics and food shortages. The paulistas considered themselves the rightful owners of the gold extracted from the mines, citing their role in its discovery and conquest, and were unwilling to let others claim this wealth. Consequently, in 1707, they came into conflict with the Portuguese and other Brazilian settlers—a group they dubbed "emboabas" (a Tupi term used to refer to "outsiders"). This sparked the War of the Emboabas, which ended in 1709. The paulistas were defeated, and many were forced to abandon the goldfields of Minas Gerais; some returned to the São Paulo plateau or settled in what is now the southern part of Minas Gerais, while others resumed their search for the precious metal in Brazil's interior, eventually discovering gold again in Goiás and Mato Grosso. The imposition of authority by the Portuguese Crown also helped bring the conflict to an end, following the creation of the Captaincy of São Paulo and Minas de Ouro in 1709.

In 1711, the first towns—Sabará, Vila Rica, and Vila de Nossa Senhora do Carmo—were established in Minas Gerais. In 1720, the Vila Rica Revolt broke out in opposition to taxes levied on gold; consequently, the Captaincy of Minas Gerais was created that same year. The Portuguese Crown began to strictly control gold mining, collecting 20% of all output—a levy known as the quinto (the "fifth"). Although the population of the captaincy continued to grow, agricultural activity remained limited to small-scale subsistence farming, necessitating the importation of goods from other parts of the colony. New routes into the region were developed, leading to a significant increase in the flow of people and produce, which gave rise to Brazil's first major consumer market. Settlements emerged along these routes, playing a crucial role in the peopling of the captaincy. Notable among these paths was the Caminho Novo ("New Road"), which connected the mining regions to Rio de Janeiro. The intense mingling of people, combined with the wealth generated by gold and the development of urban life, fostered a new, culturally diverse society that included numerous musicians, artists, sculptors, and craftspeople. Among the cultural movements that emerged, the work of figures such as Aleijadinho and Mestre Ataíde stands out, contributing to the flourishing of the Minas Gerais Baroque style.

In the 1720s, diamonds were discovered in the Jequitinhonha Valley region, though for decades those who found them failed to recognize the value of these precious stones. Upon realizing the region's mineral output, however, the Portuguese Crown soon established a system for taxing production—much like the quinto applied to gold. The primary center for diamond extraction was located near what would become Arraial do Tijuco (present-day Diamantina). At the height of the gold rush, enslaved labor was essential to large-scale landowners. Consequently, the trafficking of Black people from the African continent to work in the mines intensified. Many of these individuals attempted—and succeeded in—escaping, leading to the widespread emergence of quilombos throughout what is now the state. It is estimated that more than 120 such communities appeared across the captaincy during the 18th century. These settlements were often not very far from the mining centers, which facilitated further escapes. Furthermore, a trade in subsistence goods developed between the inhabitants of the quilombos and local merchants, who took advantage of the lower prices offered by their inhabitants.

==== Minas Gerais' conspiracy ====
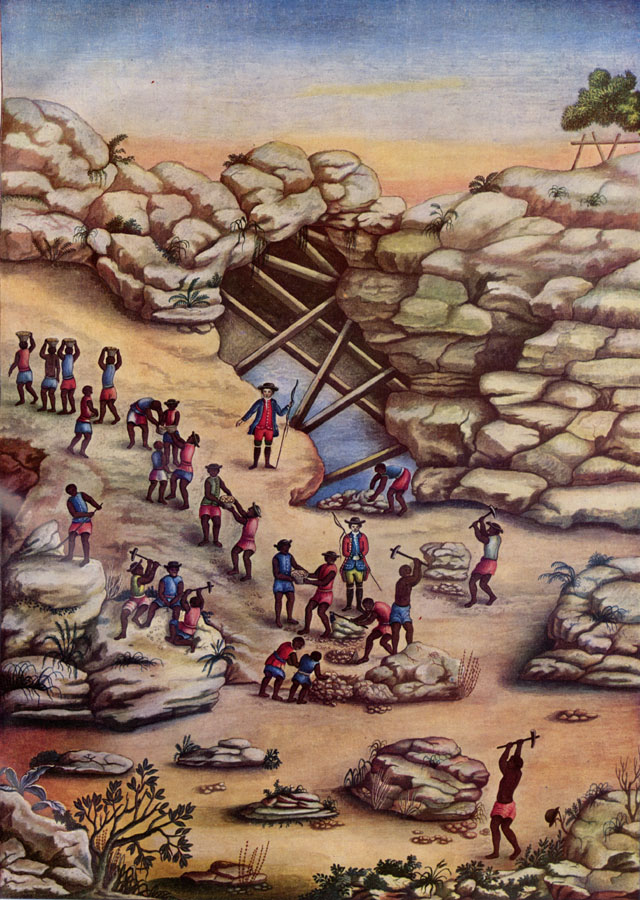
Diamond mining, by Carlos Julião, c. 1770

From the second half of the 18th century onward, gold production began to show clear signs of decline. To maintain tax revenue, the Portuguese Crown increased taxes and tightened oversight in the colony; it also introduced the derrama—a new form of levy designed to secure its profits. As gold-bearing regions became increasingly depleted, the settlers found themselves unable to meet these tax demands, leading the Portuguese government to confiscate their properties.

These actions, perceived as abusive, fueled deep discontent among the population in the mining region. Influenced by the ideals of the Enlightenment—which had emerged in Europe and were spreading throughout the Western world—the local mining elites began to devise a plan to establish a new republic in the region of Minas Gerais. The revolution was scheduled for 1789, coinciding with the planned imposition of a new derrama levy. Among the movement's leaders were the poets Cláudio Manoel da Costa and Tomás Antônio Gonzaga, the priest Carlos Correia de Toledo e Melo, Colonel Joaquim Silvério dos Reis, and José Joaquim da Silva Xavier, known as Tiradentes. Ultimately, however, the Portuguese authorities revoked the derrama. Simultaneously, the Crown began investigating the brewing insurrection. In exchange for the forgiveness of his debts, Joaquim Silvério dos Reis betrayed the plot, leading to the arrest of several of his associates before the uprising could take place. Because many of the movement's members were closely tied to the elite, few were actually convicted. Since Tiradentes came from a humble background, the full responsibility for the movement was placed upon him. As a means of suppressing other movements, the Portuguese Crown had him hanged and quartered, and parts of his body were scattered along the captaincy's access routes.

==== Decline in mineral production ====
Until then, the majority of the captaincy's population was concentrated in urban centers and in the vicinity of the mining region. However, the depletion of gold and diamond deposits led to a diaspora of the urban population, who moved to other regions. Pioneers established new farms across various parts of what is now the state, erecting chapels around which small settlements and towns subsequently emerged. At the beginning of the 19th century, there was an intensive creation of towns, parishes, districts, and municipalities. This contributed to the expansion and settlement of the territory, extending its borders to the north (acquiring parts of the province of Pernambuco), to the east (acquiring areas from Espírito Santo), and to the west (annexing the Triângulo Mineiro region, which had previously belonged to Goiás). The population of the territory became predominantly rural, and the "gold towns" grew increasingly desolate—a shift that exerted a significant influence on the province's culture and politics.

=== Imperial period ===
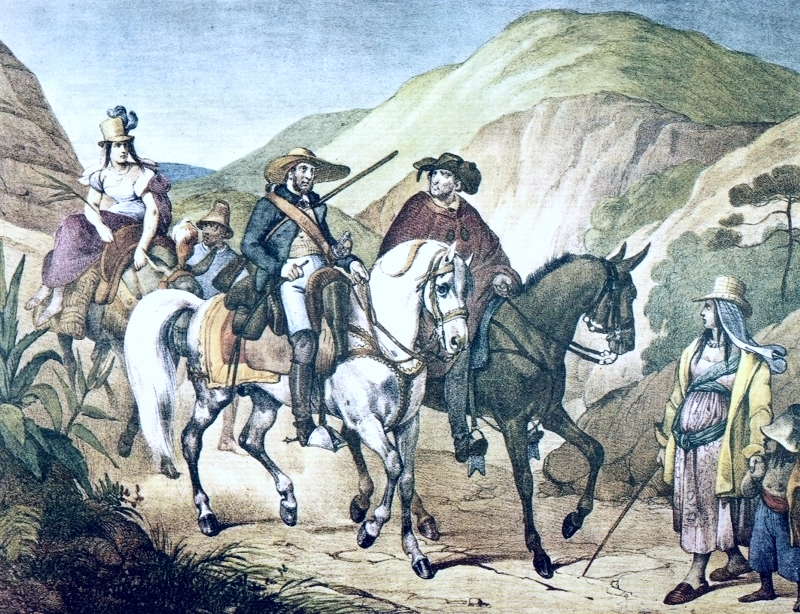
People of Minas Gerais in the 1820s

In 1820, the Liberal Revolution of Porto took place in Portugal. King John VI and the governors of the captaincies in Brazil were required to swear allegiance to the new Portuguese constitution. This placed governors who were allies of absolutism in an awkward position—among them the governor of the Captaincy of Minas Gerais, Manuel de Portugal e Castro, who held office from 1814 to 1821. From 1823 onward, the province of Minas Gerais was governed by a president appointed by the central authority.

While the Captaincy of Minas Gerais possessed certain unique characteristics during the colonial period, it became increasingly similar to other provinces—both politically and economically—throughout the Brazil's Imperial era. This was a consequence of the unitary state structure imposed by the Constitution of 1824. Nevertheless, the people of Minas continued to exert influence over major national events, such as the abdication of Emperor Pedro I in 1831.

During the Imperial period, Minas Gerais experienced two significant popular mobilizations. The first was the Military Sedition of 1833—a poorly organized movement that sought the return of Emperor Pedro I to the country, but which was quickly suppressed by the provincial government. Another major movement was the Liberal Revolution of 1842. In Imperial Brazil, political forces were essentially divided between Liberals and Conservatives. When Emperor Pedro II was declared of age in 1840, the Conservative Party assumed power, sparking a revolt among the Liberals. Armed conflicts subsequently broke out in the province of São Paulo; in 1842, Liberals in Minas Gerais joined the cause, with fifteen of the forty-two municipalities then in existence participating at the outset. To contain the insurgents, the Imperial government dispatched National Guard and Army units with orders to arrest the leaders of the Liberal Party. Over the course of more than two months, several clashes took place until the movement was finally completely suppressed. The leaders were brought to trial and acquitted six years later.

During the second half of the 19th century, the first industrial advances emerged in Minas Gerais. In the iron and steel sector, the production and manufacturing of iron began to increase. Several factories were also established, producing textiles, dairy products, wine, food items, ceramics, and tableware. Nevertheless, agricultural and livestock activities dominated the economy of the era; these were primarily geared toward subsistence, which hindered the province's economic growth. The labor force consisted predominantly of enslaved people—a legacy of the earlier mining era. Coffee production for export reached the province early in the Imperial period and grew substantially by the end of the century, with the Zona da Mata and the southern region serving as the primary cultivation areas within Minas Gerais. However, production in the neighboring province of São Paulo was consistently and significantly higher, as a combination of administrative, natural, and economic factors hindered the development of the coffee industry in Minas Gerais at the time.

=== Old Republic ===
The Palácio da Liberdade, in Belo Horizonte, served as the seat of the Government of Minas Gerais from 1897 to 2010

In 1889, the Republic was proclaimed in Brazil, and Minas Gerais became a state within the federation. However, adapting to the new political regime proved difficult: during the first 19 months of the Republic (from 15 November 1889 to 15 June 1891), Minas Gerais experienced 14 administrative periods, with seven different authorities rotating through power. The advent of the Republic saw the rise of the first major "coffee barons" in Minas Gerais, who were responsible for significantly increasing the state's production. These coffee growers wielded considerable influence over state politics.

The coffee cycle in the state possessed certain specific characteristics that hindered its economic growth. A portion of the profits generated by the crop flowed toward export ports located in neighboring states. Furthermore, the end of slavery did not lead to an immediate transition to a system of free, wage-based labor on the plantations, which resulted in a more limited circulation of currency. Another complicating factor was the lack of integration between the state's various regions, which often maintained stronger economic ties with neighboring states than with one another. Recognizing this, the elites of Minas Gerais sought to centralize the state's economy through several initiatives—most notably the creation of a new capital, Belo Horizonte, in 1897. An exception to the industrial stagnation of Minas Gerais during the Old Republic was the city of Juiz de Fora, which experienced a burst of industrial development—fueled by the coffee economy and its proximity to Rio de Janeiro. This growth, however, lasted only until 1930, when competition from other major industrial centers in the country led to the stagnation and subsequent decline of the city's industrial base.

With the capital relocated to Belo Horizonte and the state government organized, by 1898, Minas Gerais—then the most populous state in Brazil—was prepared to enter the national political arena. Consequently, the oligarchies of Minas Gerais established an arrangement with the elites of São Paulo known as the "coffee-with-milk" politics, under which the presidency of Brazil would alternate between candidates from São Paulo and Minas Gerais. Throughout the remainder of the Old Republic, four figures from Minas Gerais—Afonso Pena, Venceslau Brás, Delfim Moreira, and Artur Bernardes, all former governors of the state—served as president of Brazil. During this period of Brazilian history, the dominant political party in the state was the Republican Party of Minas Gerais. Key figures within the party included Bias Fortes, Silviano Brandão, Francisco Antônio de Sales, and Raul Soares, all of whom had served as state governors. The party wielded significant power: it controlled political appointments, co-opted civic clubs and coffee growers, and intimidated the press.

Despite occasional friction within the "coffee-with-milk" alliance—which at times allowed for the election of presidents from other states—São Paulo and Minas Gerais never ceased to exert influence over the electoral process. In the 1920s, several factors accelerated the decline of this oligarchic dominance, including popular uprisings, the tenentist uprisings, and a crisis in the coffee economy, which was further exacerbated by the Great Depression. The "coffee-with-milk" system effectively came to an end when the incumbent president, Washington Luís—who represented São Paulo—chose to nominate another politician from São Paulo, Júlio Prestes, rather than a candidate from Minas Gerais as his successor. In response to this, Minas Gerais formed an alliance with the states of Paraíba and Rio Grande do Sul, creating the Liberal Alliance, which nominated Getúlio Vargas—from Rio Grande do Sul—for the presidency.

=== Vargas Era to the present day ===
Following the conclusion of the Revolution of 1930, Getúlio Vargas' provisional government began. The state was governed by Olegário Maciel—one of the revolution's leaders and the only state governor in the country to remain in office. Upon his death in September 1933, the federal government began appointing direct interveners to lead the executive branch in Minas Gerais. Gustavo Capanema took office on an interim basis, serving for a short period until the appointment of Benedito Valadares, who governed Minas Gerais for twelve years (1933–1945)—a tenure that spanned the entire Estado Novo period—and helped found the Social Democratic Party (PSD) in 1945. On 24 October 1943, the Manifesto dos Mineiros was released, calling for the democratization of the country—a goal that would only be realized in 1946, following the ousting of Vargas.

The development strategy for Minas Gerais was guided by two main approaches. The first involved diversifying production, with the aim of establishing a robust agricultural sector capable of supporting industrial development. The second strategy focused on leveraging the state's natural resources to specialize production, specifically through the manufacturing of intermediate goods. Throughout the first half of the 20th century, this plan was gradually implemented through various initiatives, such as the creation of the Industrial City of Contagem in 1941. However, progress was hindered by logistical challenges, including energy shortages and the lack of an efficient transportation network.

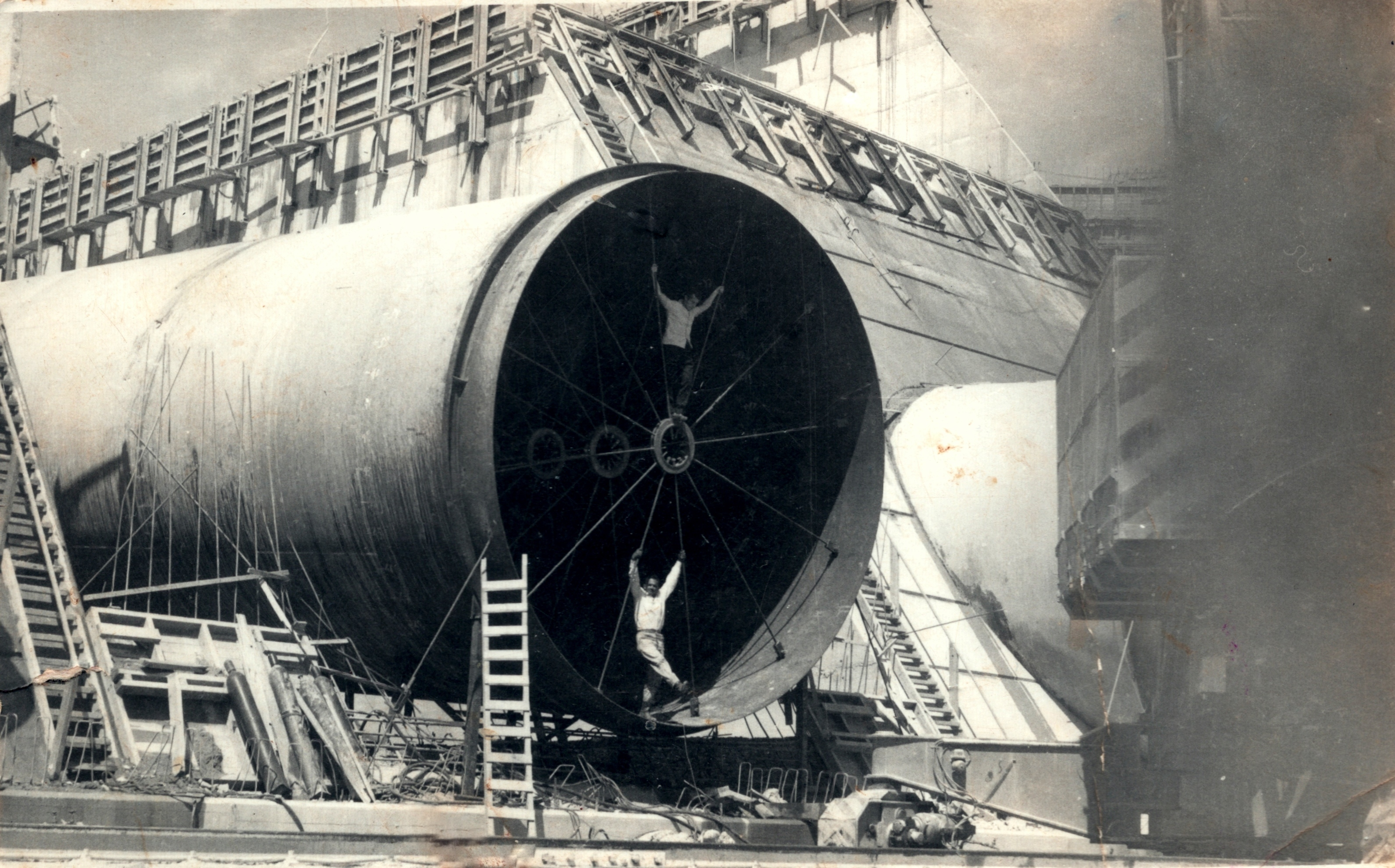
Piping used for the construction of the Furnas Hydroelectric Power Plant

Even with the redemocratization of Brazil in 1946, Minas Gerais continued to be governed by federal appointees—now named by President Eurico Gaspar Dutra—until direct elections were held in January 1947, when Milton Campos was elected governor. From the late 1940s through the 1950s, Minas Gerais underwent a significant transformation aimed at addressing the obstacles to the state's development; this was especially notable during the periods when Juscelino Kubitschek served as governor (1951–1955) and subsequently as president of Brazil (1956–1961). During this time, the state-owned energy company CEMIG was established, several hydroelectric power plants were built, and thousands of kilometers of highways were constructed. The metallurgical sector also emerged as a key industry, supported by iron ore extraction in the central region of the state. However, the economic instability that followed in the 1960s hindered this growth, causing the state to fall behind.

Following Kubitschek's resignation to run in the 1955 presidential election—which he won—he was succeeded by his deputy, Clóvis Salgado, who completed the term through 1956. Salgado was subsequently followed by Bias Fortes (1956–1961) and Magalhães Pinto (1961–1966). Pinto was among the state governors who supported the 1964 coup d'état and was, therefore, kept in office by the military dictatorship that was subsequently established. In 1965, Israel Pinheiro was elected governor, taking office on 31 January 1966, just days before the issuance of Institutional Act No. 3 (AI-3). This act suspended direct elections for state governors, mandating instead that they be elected indirectly by state legislative assemblies. The first to be chosen in this manner was Rondon Pacheco (1971–1975), followed by Aureliano Chaves (1975–1978)—along with his deputy, Ozanam Coelho (1978–1979)—and Francelino Pereira (1979–1982), all of whom belonged to the National Renewal Alliance (ARENA), the ruling party.

During the 1970s, Minas Gerais resumed its path of economic growth, benefiting primarily from a process of industrial decentralization. Consequently, the state's GDP growth outpaced the national average for several years. This trend was driven by an expansion in industrial production and the strengthening of the agricultural sector. The shift also led to an increase in the proportion of the population living in cities, although a significant portion of this rural exodus resulted in the migration of people to major urban centers in other states. In the 1980s, economic growth in Minas Gerais faced another interruption due to the widespread economic crisis affecting the entire country. Nevertheless, the state's growth rate remained higher than the national average.

In 1982, with the return of direct elections for governor, candidate Tancredo Neves won; he was later elected President of Brazil in 1985, but did not take office due to health issues. Following Tancredo's resignation in 1984, his deputy, Hélio Garcia, governed until the end of the term in 1987, at which point he handed over the administration to Newton Cardoso (1987–1991). From the 1990s onward, the state experienced low economic dynamism, in line with the national trend. Since then, Minas Gerais has solidified its place in the national economy, holding the third-largest GDP in the country—a position it maintains to this day.

Hélio Garcia returned to the state government in 1991 and was succeeded by Eduardo Azeredo (1995–1998) and former President Itamar Franco (1999–2003). In 2002 and 2006, Aécio Neves was elected—the first governor in the state's history to be re-elected—with Antonio Anastasia serving as his deputy and eventual successor (2010–2014). Since then, he has been succeeded by Alberto Pinto Coelho (2014), Fernando Pimentel (2015–2018), and Romeu Zema (2019–2026), along with his deputy, Mateus Simões, who has held office from 22 March 2026, to the present day.

== Geography ==
Minas Gerais is one of the 27 federal units of Brazil, located in the country's Southeast Region. It shares borders with the states of São Paulo to the south and southeast, Rio de Janeiro to the southeast, Mato Grosso do Sul to the west, Goiás and the Federal District to the northwest, Bahia to the north and northeast, and Espírito Santo to the north and east, with a total boundary length of 4,727 km. According to the Brazilian Institute of Geography and Statistics (IBGE), the state covers an area of 586,513.983 km²—slightly less than the combined area of Portugal and Spain (596,994 km²)—which accounts for 6.89% of Brazil's total territory. It is the fourth-largest state by land area (following Amazonas, Pará, and Mato Grosso), with 2,525.8 km² classified as urban territory. The linear distance between the state's extreme points is 1,248 km in the east–west direction and 986 km in the north–south direction.

=== Terrain ===
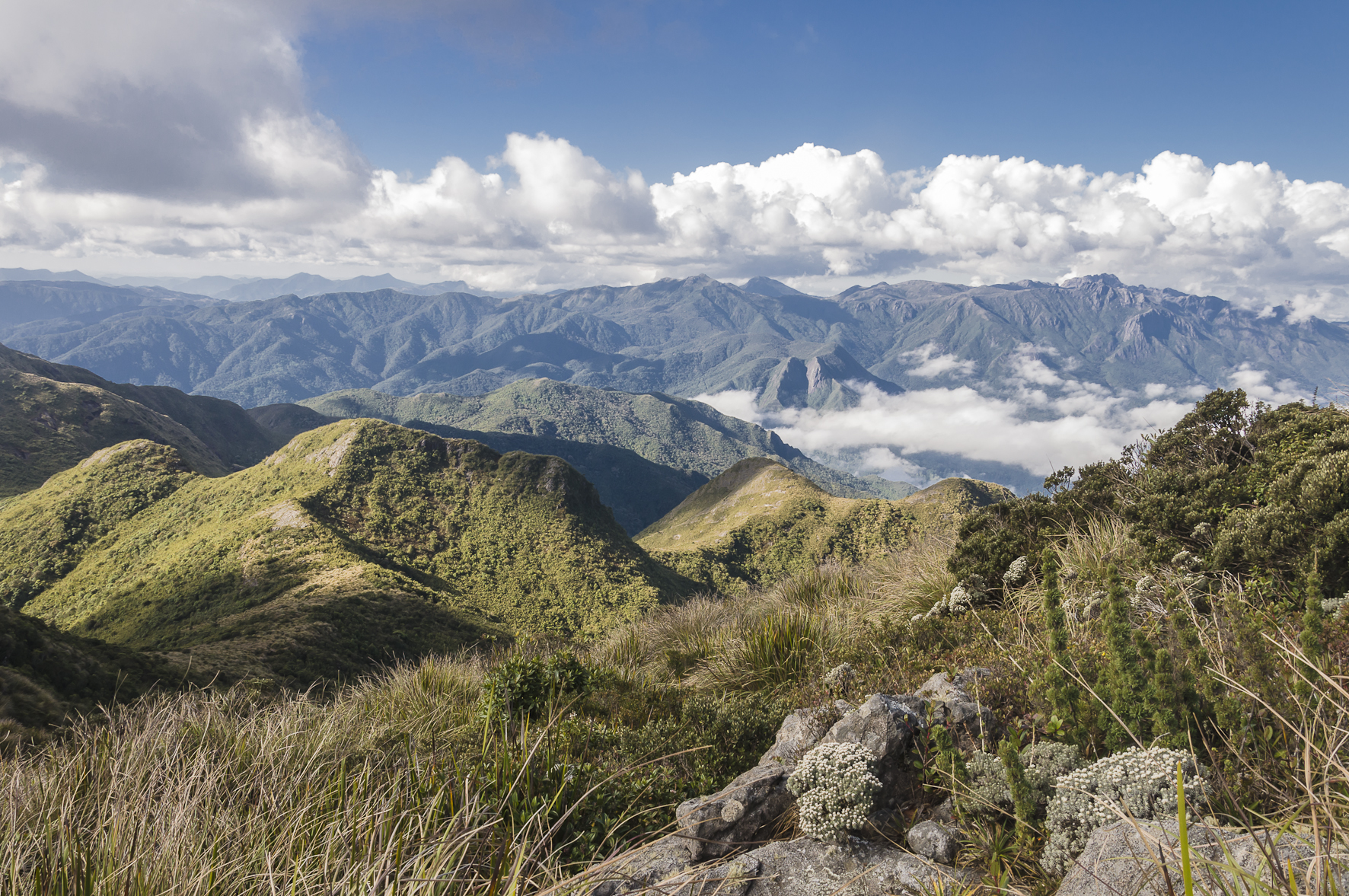
The Mantiqueira Mountains

More than 90% of the territory of Minas Gerais lies at an altitude above 300 meters; nearly 60% is above 600 meters, and 20% is between 900 and 1,500 meters. The state's highest point is Pico da Bandeira, located on the border with Espírito Santo, at an altitude of 2,891 meters (the third-highest in the country), followed by Pico do Cristal at 2,780 meters. In addition to the Serra do Caparaó—where Pico da Bandeira is situated—other mountain massifs in Minas Gerais are noteworthy, including the Espinhaço Mountains, which stretches from the center of the state northward to the border with Bahia. To the south, marking the boundary with the states of São Paulo and Rio de Janeiro, lies the Mantiqueira Mountains, home to some of the country's highest peaks, such as Agulhas Negras, which reaches an altitude of 2,787 meters. Other, smaller mountain ranges are scattered throughout the state, most notably the Canastra Mountains and the Serra do Lenheiro.

Officially, the landforms found in the state of Minas Gerais can be categorized into the following geomorphological units: the Crystalline Plateau, the Serra do Espinhaço, the São Francisco River Depression, the São Francisco Plateau, and the Paraná Plateau. The Crystalline Plateau has an average altitude of 800 meters—decreasing as it approaches the Zona da Mata region—and features depressions where the valleys of the Jequitinhonha and Doce rivers originate. The Espinhaço Mountains are significant for separating the São Francisco River basin from the coastal river basins. The São Francisco River depression has an average elevation of 500 meters and is located in the western part of Minas Gerais, extending in a north-south direction. The São Francisco plateau has an average elevation of 1,000 meters and consists of irregular tablelands (chapadões) interconnected by valleys. Finally, the Paraná plateau has an average elevation of 600 meters and corresponds to the southwestern region of Minas Gerais; it is crossed by rivers such as the Prata, Tijuco, and Araguari.

=== Hidrography ===
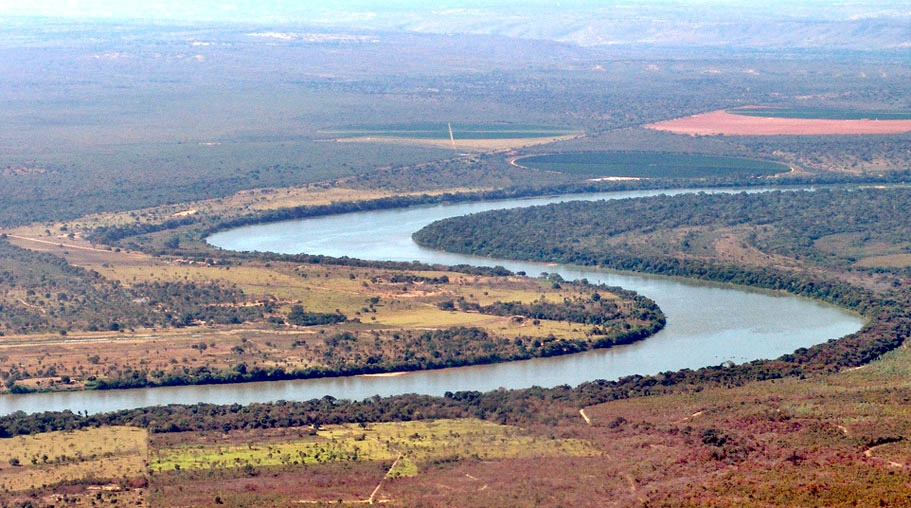
Section of the São Francisco River between the municipalities of Ponto Chique and Várzea da Palma

Among the major rivers in the state of Minas Gerais are the Doce, which originates between the slopes of the Mantiqueira and Espinhaço mountain ranges and flows for 853 km before emptying into the Atlantic Ocean in the state of Espírito Santo; the Grande, which rises in the Mantiqueira Mountains—in the municipality of Bocaina de Minas—and travels 1,360 km until it meets the Paranaíba River, together forming the Paraná River (in the state of São Paulo); the Paranaíba, which originates in the Mata da Corda region and spans approximately 1,070 km; the São Francisco, which flows from the center of the state toward the north, covering 2,830 km and passing through the states of Bahia, Pernambuco, Alagoas, and Sergipe; and finally, the Jequitinhonha, which rises in the Espinhaço Mountains—in the municipality of Serro—and runs for 920 km to its mouth on the Atlantic coast. Other significant rivers in the state include the Mucuri, Pardo, Paraíba do Sul, São Mateus, and Velhas. The Rio Doce State Park contains the largest lake system in the state. Additionally, there are major reservoirs created for hydroelectric power plants, such as the Furnas Reservoir in the south and the Três Marias Reservoir in the center of the state.

Due to the vast number of river sources, the state is known as the "water tower" of Brazil. Many of these rivers are of great importance for energy, agriculture, and tourism, hosting numerous hydroelectric plants, irrigation canals, and recreational areas. Sixteen river basins make up the state of Minas Gerais, the largest of which is the São Francisco basin, which covers an area of 2.3 million km² across Brazil's territory. Four hydrographic regions encompass the territory of Minas Gerais: the São Francisco region (with the São Francisco, Velhas, and Paracatu rivers as its main components within the state), the Eastern Atlantic region (including rivers such as the São Mateus, Doce, Itaúnas, and Itabapoana), the Southeastern Atlantic region, and the Paraná region (comprising the sub-basins of the Paranaíba and Grande rivers). During the dry season, water volumes decrease; in the northern part of the state, some watercourses may even dry up completely during these periods. Conversely, the rainy season brings rising river levels, which can occasionally lead to flooding.

=== Climate ===
Minas Gerais in the Köppen climate classification

In the state of Minas Gerais, four distinct climate types predominate: the subtropical highland climate (Cwb, according to the Köppen-Geiger climate classification), which occurs in the higher regions of the Canastra, Espinhaço, and Mantiqueira mountain ranges, as well as in small areas near the cities of Araguari and Carmo do Paranaíba—characterized by dry winters, mild temperatures throughout the year, and an average temperature in the warmest month of less than 22 °C; the subtropical climate with dry winters (and temperatures below 18 °C) and hot summers (temperatures above 22 °C) (Cwa), observed north of the Espinhaço and Cabral mountain ranges; the tropical climate with dry winters (Aw), which prevails in the Triângulo Mineiro, the Zona da Mata, the Rio Doce Valley, and across nearly the entire northern half of the state—featuring a dry season in the winter and abundant rainfall in the summer, with annual precipitation ranging from 750 mm to 1,800 mm; and the tropical semi-humid climate with summer rains (As), which occurs in the northern part of the state, with annual precipitation consistently below 1,000 mm and, at times, less than 750 mm. According to the Superintendency for the Development of the Northeast (Sudene), a semi-arid climate is present in 88 municipalities in Minas Gerais, all located in the northern part of the state, many of which are undergoing a process of desertification.

The state is influenced by cold fronts throughout the year; however, during the winter, the presence of the South Atlantic High hinders the movement of moisture—keeping days dry and sunny—and facilitates the influence of cold air masses, thereby establishing the dry season. Between late spring and early summer (primarily from November to March), as the anticyclone moves away, cold fronts become more intense, and there is a significant organization of tropical convection—manifested as bands of convective cloudiness known as convergence zones. Among these, the South Atlantic Convergence Zone (SACZ) has the greatest impact on the state, often triggering consecutive days of heavy rainfall in certain regions. Due to this cloud cover, the rain brought by the SACZ and cold fronts can lead to drops in temperature—a notable shift, given that temperatures are typically high during this time of year due to the influence of continental warm air masses.

According to data from the National Institute of Meteorology (INMET), the lowest temperature ever recorded in the state of Minas Gerais was −8.4 °C in Maria da Fé, on 21 July 1981, while the highest occurred in the city of Araçuaí, where the temperature reached a peak of 44.8 °C on 19 November 2023. This also stands as the highest temperature ever recorded by INMET in Brazil, surpassing the 44.7 °C registered in Bom Jesus, Piauí, on 21 November 2005.

=== Ecology and environment ===
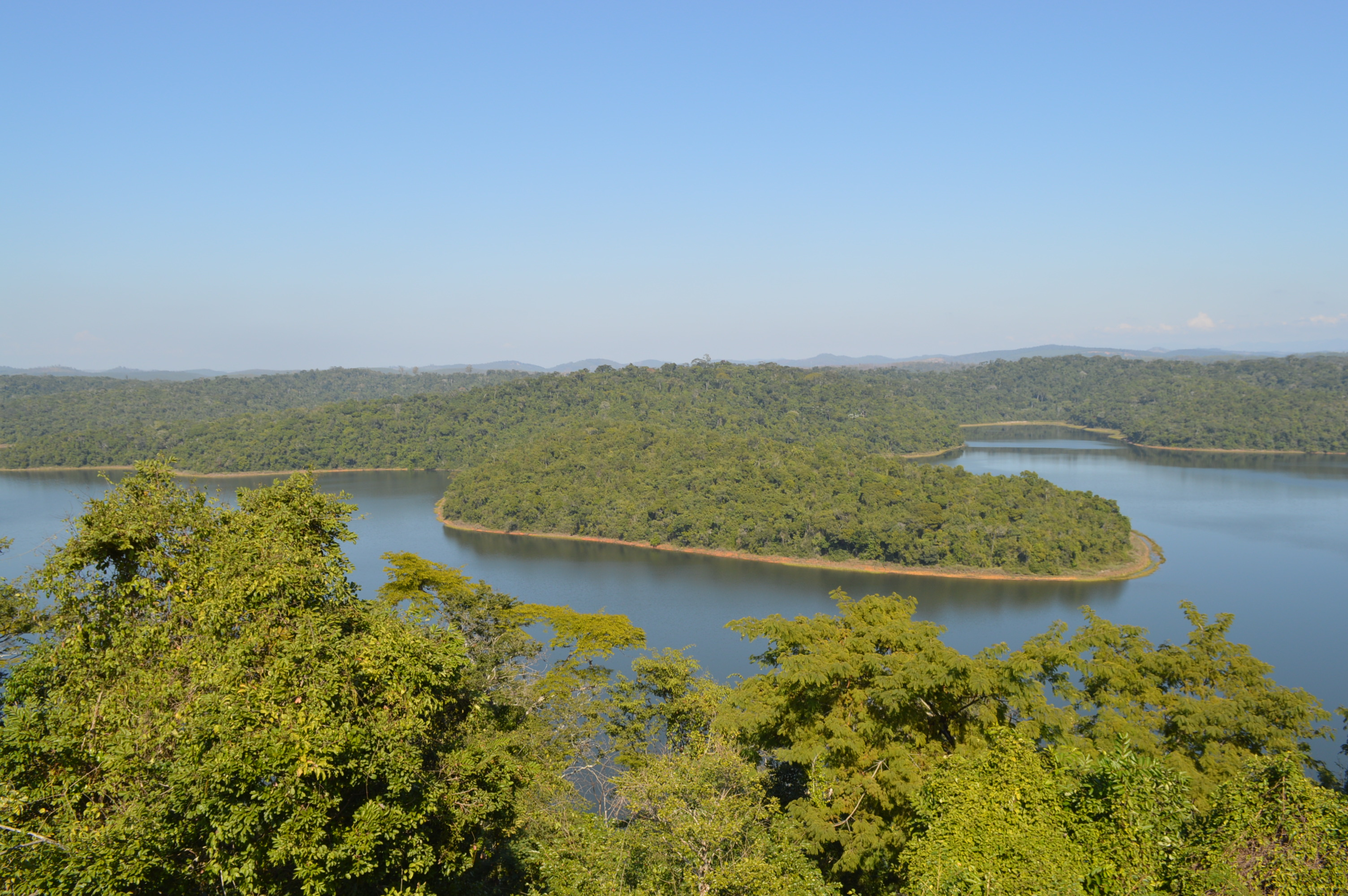
The Rio Doce State Park, in the Rio Doce Valley, houses the largest Atlantic Forest reserve in the state

Originally, the vegetation cover of Minas Gerais consisted of four main biomes: the Cerrado, the Atlantic Forest, the Campos Rupestres (rocky highland grasslands), and dry forests. The Cerrado is the predominant biome, covering 50% of the state's territory and being most prevalent in its western portion. The vegetation is primarily low-growing, consisting of grasses, shrubs, and trees. Its fauna includes anteaters, armadillos, tapirs, boa constrictors, rattlesnakes, and crab-eating foxes, as well as endangered species such as the maned wolf, the pampas deer, and the Brazilian merganser.

The Atlantic Forest occupies the second-largest area in Minas Gerais, historically predominating in the Zona da Mata, Campos das Vertentes, the southern region, the Belo Horizonte Metropolitan Area, and the Rio Doce and Mucuri valleys; however, it has been severely devastated and is now restricted to isolated pockets. The vegetation is dense and—due to high rainfall—very lush, featuring bromeliads, lianas, ferns, orchids, and lichens. The local fauna includes monkeys, sloths, capybaras, jaguars, macaws, parrots, and hummingbirds. The Campos Rupestres consist of lower-stature vegetation typical of the state's highlands; they are characterized by herbaceous plants and few trees, and are home to foxes, deer, small monkeys, capybaras, and snakes. The "dry forest" is a Cerrado phytocoenosis found in the northern part of the state, within the São Francisco River valley. It is characterized by thorny plants and dry branches; notable flora include barrigudas (Ceiba glaziovii), Tabebuia, and pau-ferros (Libidibia ferrea), while the fauna includes the giant otter, jaguar, tapir, capybara, and osprey.

According to Minas Gerais' State Forestry Institute (IEF), as of 2012, the state contained eleven ecological stations (protecting a total of 12,528.9812 hectares), nine biological reserves (16,977.35 hectares), eleven natural monuments (8,581.8 hectares), four wildlife refuges (22,292.76 hectares), 16 environmental protection areas (APA — 2,154,705.71 hectares), two state forests (4,538.87 hectares), one sustainable development reserve (4,538.87 hectares), 182 private natural heritage reserves (RPPN — 90,148.39 hectares), and 23 state parks. Seven national parks are also located in Minas Gerais—Caparaó, Grande Sertão Veredas, Itatiaia, Cavernas do Peruaçu, Sempre Vivas, Serra da Canastra, and Serra do Cipó—according to the Chico Mendes Institute for Biodiversity Conservation (ICMBio). Furthermore, the Serra do Cipó region boasts the highest plant species density per square meter in the world.

Despite the existence of protected areas, the state still experiences significant levels of deforestation, with 9.84% of its territory falling within the "drought polygon" (a region prone to periodic droughts), according to data from the Food and Agriculture Organization (FAO). Another critical situation concerns the Atlantic Forest biome, which lost 10,572 hectares in the state between 2011 and 2012—accounting for 44% of the total area deforested across the entire country.

The Atlantic Forest, which once stretched from what is now Rio Grande do Sul to Rio Grande do Norte, has been almost entirely devastated; only 5% of its original vegetation (approximately 52,000 km²) remains today. In Minas Gerais, it once covered about 81.8% of the state's current territory, but today that figure stands at only 7%. The primary drivers of this deforestation have included the extraction of Brazilwood, sugarcane and coffee plantations during the colonial period, and, more recently, mining and large-scale agriculture and livestock farming. Conversely, various government projects and private initiatives are now working to reverse this trend.

Panorama of the Serra do Cipó National Park

=== Modern geographic division ===
The 13 intermediate geographic regions of Minas Gerais, divided by a red line. Inside them, the immediate geographic regions, divided by a black line.

According to the modern (2017) geographic classification by Brazil's National Institute of Geography and Statistics (IBGE), which succeeded the division in mesoregions and microregions (1988), the state is now divided in 13 intermediate geographic regions, each one divided in immediate geographic regions (70 total in the whole state):

- Intermediate Geographic Region of Belo Horizonte
- Intermediate Geographic Region of Patos de Minas
- Intermediate Geographic Region of Montes Claros
- Intermediate Geographic Region of Teófilo Otoni
- Intermediate Geographic Region of Governador Valadares
- Intermediate Geographic Region of Ipatinga
- Intermediate Geographic Region of Barbacena
- Intermediate Geographic Region of Juiz de Fora
- Intermediate Geographic Region of Divinópolis
- Intermediate Geographic Region of Varginha
- Intermediate Geographic Region of Pouso Alegre
- Intermediate Geographic Region of Uberaba
- Intermediate Geographic Region of Uberlândia

== Geology ==
Starting in the early 1700s along the banks of the Jequitinhonha River, and for the next 150 years, Minas Gerais was the world's major supplier of gem diamonds. According to Svisero et al, "They are usually recovered as loose crystals along rivers in unconsolidated alluvial or glacial sediments, or they are embedded in conglomerates or metamorphosed sedimentary rocks. They are also found in small amounts in a few known kimberlite bodies."

=== Paleontology ===
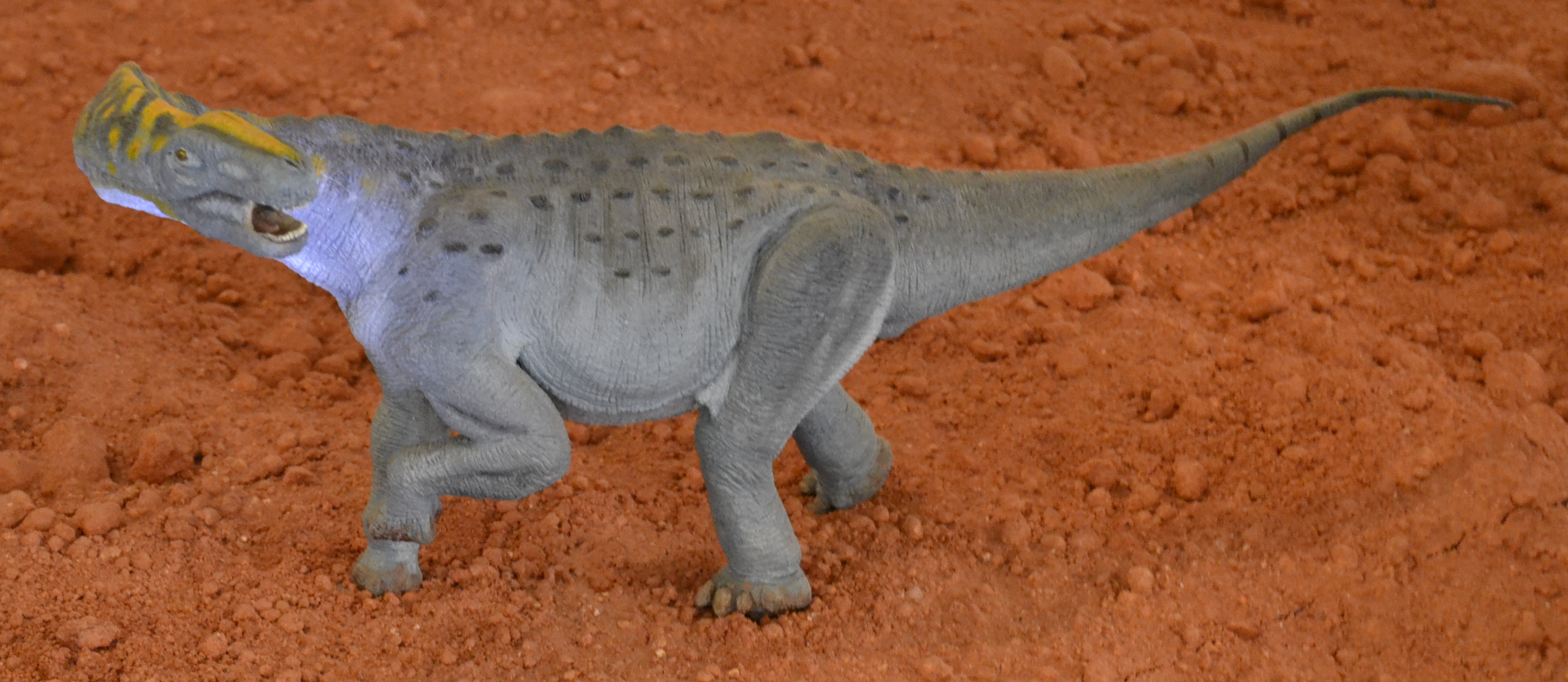
Maxakalisaurus

The discovery of Maxakalisaurus fossils was a significant paleontological find. The fossil is a genus of titanosaurid dinosaur found 45 kilometers (28 mi) from the city of Prata, in the state of Minas Gerais in 1998. It is closely related to Saltasaurus, a sauropod considered unusual because it had evolved apparently defensive traits, including bony plates on its skin and vertical plates along its spine; such osteoderms have also been found for Maxakalisaurus. The genus name is derived from the Maxakali tribe.

The Maxakalisaurus fossils belonged to an animal about 13 meters (43.3 ft) long, with an estimated weight of 9 tons, although, according to paleontologist Alexander Kellner, it could reach a length of approximately 20 meters (65 ft). It had a long neck and tail, ridged teeth (unusual among sauropods) and lived about 80 million years ago. Because sauropods seem to have lacked significant competition in South America, they evolved there with greater diversity and more unusual traits than elsewhere in the world. A replica has been displayed at the National Museum of Brazil, since 28 August 2006.

In the 1940s, fossil records from the Late Cretaceous period began to be unearthed in the territory of Uberaba, many of them exceptionally well-preserved. Subsequently, extensive research efforts were initiated by the National Department of Mineral Production (DNPM), which appointed paleontologist Llewellyn Ivor Price to work in the region. Due to the large quantity of fossils uncovered, the Paleontological Research Center Llewellyn Ivor Price was established in 1991, alongside the Dinosaurs Museum in Peirópolis, which is currently dedicated to the study of local paleontology in collaboration with research institutions worldwide.

In March 2024, Uberaba was officially designated as a UNESCO Global Geopark, marking it as the first of its kind in Minas Gerais. The territory is situated within the Serra da Galga Formation, where more than 10,000 fossils of various prehistoric creatures have been unearthed. Among these discoveries, the Uberabatitan ribeiroi found in 2004 ranks among the largest ever discovered in Latin America.

== Demographics ==
Historical population
Year	Pop.	±%
1872		—
1890	3,184,099	—
1900	3,594,471	+12.9%
1920	5,888,174	+63.8%
1940	6,763,368	+14.9%
1950	7,782,188	+15.1%
1960	9,960,040	+28.0%
1970	11,645,095	+16.9%
1980	13,651,852	+17.2%
1991	15,731,961	+15.2%
2000	17,905,134	+13.8%
2010	19,597,330	+9.5%
2022	20,539,989	+4.8%

According to the 2022 census, there were 20,539,989 people residing in the state. The population density was 35.02 inhabitants per square kilometre (90.7/sq mi). Urbanization: 85% (2006); Population growth: 1.4% (1991–2000); Houses: 5,731,000 (2006).

The last PNAD (National Research for Sample of Domiciles) census revealed the following numbers: 9,605,151 Brown (Multiracial) people (46.8%), 8,437,697 White people (41.2%), 2,432,877 Black people (9.8%), 31,885 Amerindian people (0.2%), 31,581 Asian people (0.2%).

Ethnicities of Minas Gerais in 2022.
1. Pardo (mixed-race) (46.8%)
2. White (41.1%)
3. Black (9.80%)
4. Indigenous (0.20%)
5. Asian (0.20%)
6. 0.01%

Colour6= transparent

Ethnic groups found in Minas Gerais include: Amerindians, Portuguese, Africans, Italians, Germans and Lebanese.

The ethnic composition of the population varies from town to town. For example, in Córrego do Bom Jesus, a small town located in the extreme south of Minas Gerais, White people make up 98.7% of the population. The South of Minas Gerais is both the most European and the most densely populated part of the state. On the other hand, in Setubinha, located in the northeast part of the state, 71.8% are mixed-race and 14.7% Black. It is historically explainable: southern Minas Gerais, in the border with São Paulo, received larger numbers of Portuguese farmers in colonial times. In the late 19th century, Italian immigrants also arrived. The north region, close to Bahia, was a place to the arrival of many African slaves since the 18th century. The central part of the state, where the capital Belo Horizonte is, has a more balanced ratio between White, Black and mixed people.

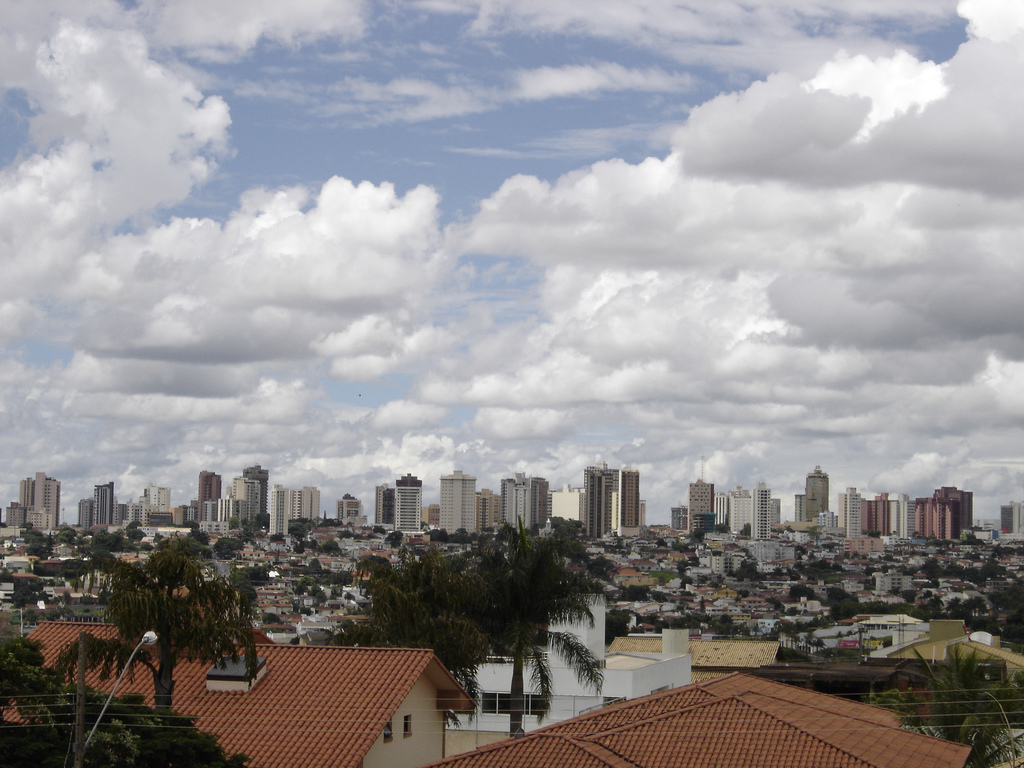
Downtown of Uberlândia, largest city in the state after Belo Horizonte

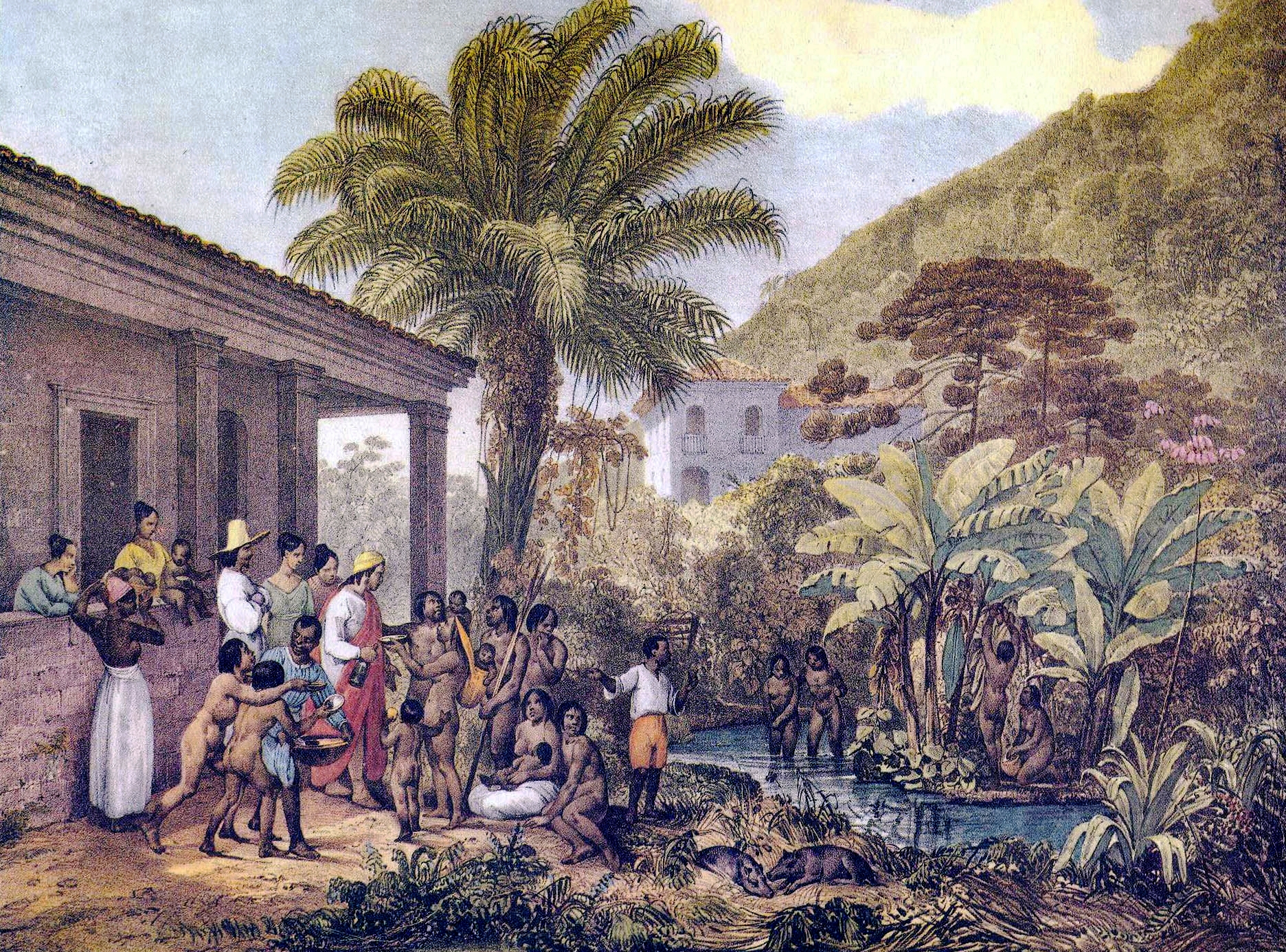
Indians visiting a farm plantation in Minas Gerais, 1824

The population of Minas Gerais is the result of an intense mixture of peoples, particularly between Black Africans and Portuguese. In colonial Minas Gerais, the population was divided in five different categories: Whites, mostly Portuguese; Africans, who often did not have a surname and were usually known for their region of origin (for example Francisca Benguela would refer to Benguela); Crioulos (Black people born in Brazil, usually to both African parents); Mulattoes (people of mixed Black and White ancestry, usually born to a Black mother and a Portuguese father) and Cabras (people of mixed ancestry, usually with high degree of Amerindian admixture). Black people and "Mulattoes" predominated in the population after the beginning of the colonization. By the 19th century, however, whites were already the largest single group in the Minas Gerais population. Taking the population as a whole (all groups included), European genes account for the majority of the Minas Gerais genetic heritage, which has been explained on the basis of the extremely high mortality rates of the enslaved African population and lower reproductive rate of African slaves (the vast majority of them were males, among other reasons for their lower reproductive success). The Amerindian population was hit hard by the diseases brought by the European colonists and they did not have much of an impact either, especially in Minas Gerais, where European presence and colonization was massive.

During the colonial period, the disproportion between the number of men and women was quite sharp. The census of 1738 in Serro do Frio, which included Diamantina, revealed that of the 9,681 inhabitants, 83.5% were men and 16.5% women. Among the slaves, women were only 3.1%. The number of free "women of color" (Black and "Mulatto") was very high. The same census revealed that 63% of the former slaves were women and only 37% men. Since interracial relationships between "women of color" and White men were widespread, the female slaves were more likely to be freed than the male slaves.

The monogamous family structure that the Catholic Church tried to deploy in colonial Brazil was the exception in Minas Gerais. At that time cohabitation and temporary relationships predominated in Minas Gerais, as well as in Brazil as a whole. Monogamy and weddings in churches would only take root in Brazil in the 19th century, fitting the moral standards imposed by the Church. The role of women in colonial Minas Gerais was much more dynamic than it would be allowed by the standards of the time. Many women used to live on their own, were heads of family and worked, particularly the "women of color" and former slaves. The society of Minas Gerais provided a great social mobility to former slaves, mainly for women. In Tejuco, the percentage of White males who were head of family (37.7%) was very similar to the percentage of Black women who were head of family (38.5%). Many former slaves were able to accumulate goods and many of them became slave owners as well. Some Black people and mainly Mulattos were able to integrate themselves in the highest social stratum of the society of Minas Gerais, once restricted to Whites. This happened through a process of "whitening" their descendence and through the assimilation of the culture of the White elite, like being members of Catholic brotherhoods.

Cohabitation was the most common crime in Minas Gerais. The Catholic Church was strict in the punishment of this crime, in order to prevent the widespread miscegenation between White, mostly Portuguese males with Black or Mulatto women.

According to a 2013 autosomal DNA study, the ancestral composition of the state of Minas Gerais can be described as: 59.20% European, 28.90% African and 11.90% Native American.

During the time of the gold rush, thousands of Portuguese immigrated to Brazil (mainly from the Minho), and many of them to Minas Gerais, the place where the gold rush activities took place. Most of them came from Entre Douro e Minho, in Northern Portugal. The reference book for a large number of these families is "Velhos Troncos Mineiros" (Old Mineiro Branches) by Raimundo Trindade. The Native American population of Minas Gerais was estimated to be at 97,000 in 1500, by the time the Portuguese arrived in Brazil in 1500 (John Hemming in "Red Gold: The Conquest of the Brazilian Indians").

The ancestry of the Africans brought to Minas Gerais was both West African and Bantu, with a predominance of the former initially and a predominance of the latter later.

=== Major cities ===
Largest cities or towns in Minas Gerais (2022 census by the Brazilian Institute of Geography and Statistics)
Rank	Name	Pop.	Rank	Name	Pop.
1	Belo Horizonte	2 315 560	11	Ipatinga	227 731
2	Uberlândia	713 232	12	Sete Lagoas	227 360
3	Contagem	621 865	13	Santa Luzia	218 805
4	Juiz de Fora	540 756	14	Ibirité	170 387
5	Montes Claros	414 240	15	Poços de Caldas	173 752
6	Betim	414 859	16	Patos de Minas	159 235
7	Uberaba	337 546	17	Pouso Alegre	152 212
8	Ribeirão das Neves	329 794	18	Teófilo Otoni	137 518
9	Governador Valadares	254 172	19	Varginha	136 467
10	Divinópolis	231 091	20	Lavras	131 521

=== Religion ===
Religion in Minas Gerais (2010)
1. Catholic Church 72.4 (71.0%)
2. Protestantism 20.2 (19.8%)
3. Spiritism 2.1 (2.06%)
4. Other religions 3.4 (3.33%)
5. Irreligious 3.9 (3.82%)

According to the 2010 Brazilian census, most of the population consider themselves to be Catholic, which puts the state in ninth place when considering the percentage of the population belonging to this religion (72.4%). Although the number of Catholics has been gradually decreasing in recent years, Roman Catholicism is still strongly rooted in Minas Gerais' culture, especially in rural areas and inland cities where celebrations and festivities organized by community parishes are common, but religious pluralism has also grown in recent years.

Almost four million inhabitants are evangelical. According to the number of followers, the Assembleias de Deus (more than seven hundred thousand followers), the Baptist Church (more than five hundred thousand followers) and the Foursquare Church (almost three hundred and fifty thousand adherents) stand out. Around 420 thousand people in the state are followers of Spiritism, whose important promoter in Brazil was the Minas Gerais-born medium Chico Xavier. There are also several other religious minorities in the state, including Umbanda and Candomblé, which together have less than twenty thousand followers and whose rituals are sometimes confused with folk traditions. Almost a million people, in turn, consider themselves irreligious, of which around seventy thousand are atheists and just over seven thousand are agnostics.

== Economy ==
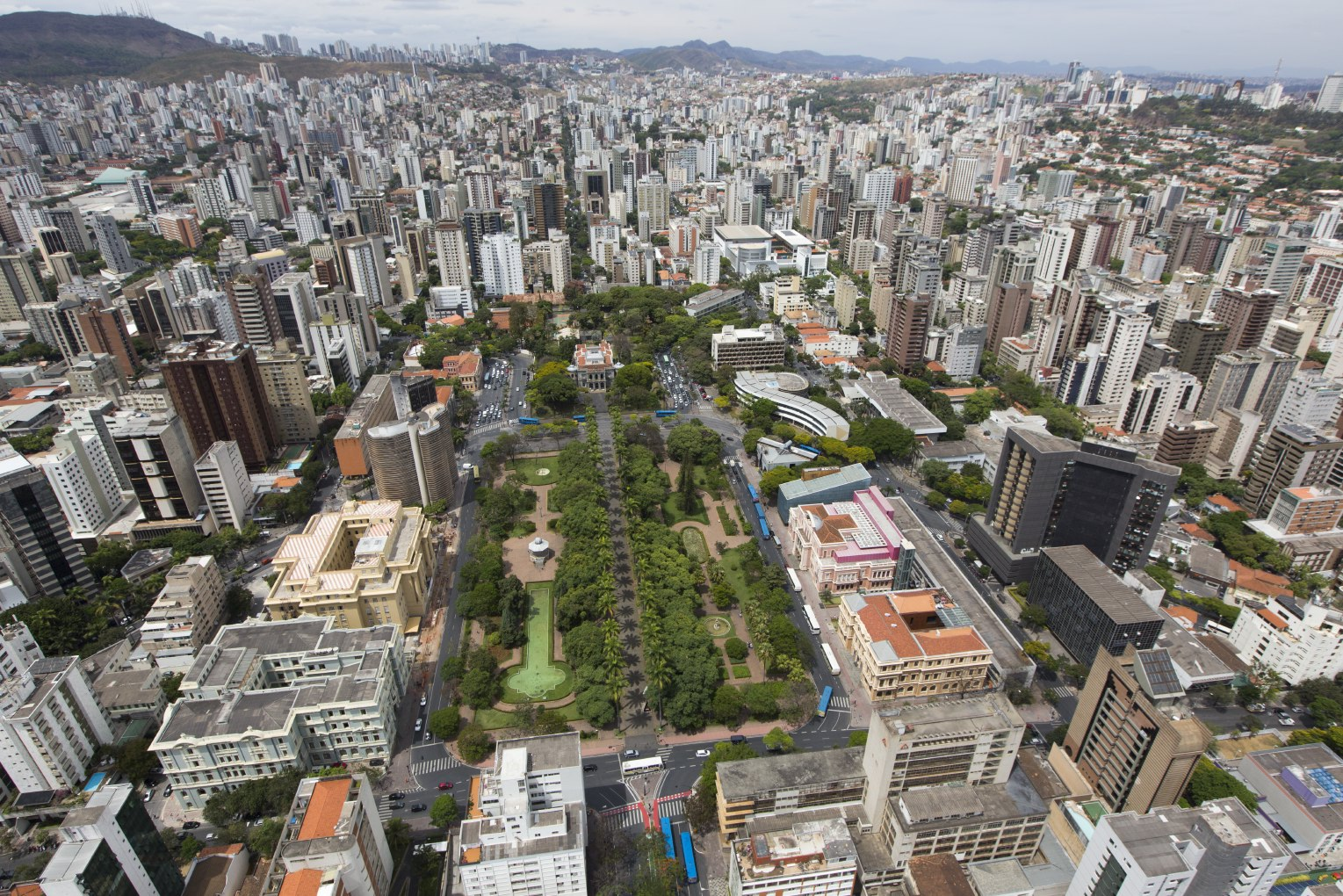
Belo Horizonte

Minas Gerais is the second-largest consumer market in Brazil, behind the state of São Paulo. It shares 10.4% of the Brazilian consumer market. Companies of this Brazilian state have access to 49% of the Brazilian consumer market, with estimated consumption potential of 223 billion US dollars. The service sector is the largest component of GDP at 47.1%, followed by the industrial sector at 44.1%. agriculture represents 8.8% of GDP (2004). Main exports: mineral products 44.4%, metals 15.8%, vegetable products 13%, precious metals 5.5%, foodstuffs 4.9%, transportation 3.5% (2012).

Its share of the Brazilian economy in 2005 was 9%. Minas Gerais had an industrial GDP of R $128.4 billion in 2017, equivalent to 10.7% of the national industry. It employs 1,069,469 workers in the industry. The main industrial sectors are: construction (17.9%), extraction of metallic minerals (15.2%), food (13.4%), industrial services of public utility, such as electricity and water (10.8%) and metallurgy (10.5%). These 5 sectors concentrate 67.8% of the state's industry.

Minas Gerais is a major producer of milk, coffee and other agricultural commodities, as well as minerals. The state has marked economic divisions. The southern part of the state (close to the São Paulo and Rio de Janeiro state borders) has several mid-sized cities with solid industrial bases such as Juiz de Fora, Varginha, Pouso Alegre, and Poços de Caldas, as well as Ipatinga in the east of the state, which is also a modern and major industrial city and Itabira, considered mother city of mining company Vale, that has stocks quoted in Bovespa and NYSE. The northeastern region is marked by poverty, but Governador Valadares and Teófilo Otoni attract foreign traders for the semi-precious gems such as topaz and sapphire. In Teófilo Otoni, some companies are also attracted because of Brazilian Export Processing Zone, a free trade area.

=== Agriculture ===
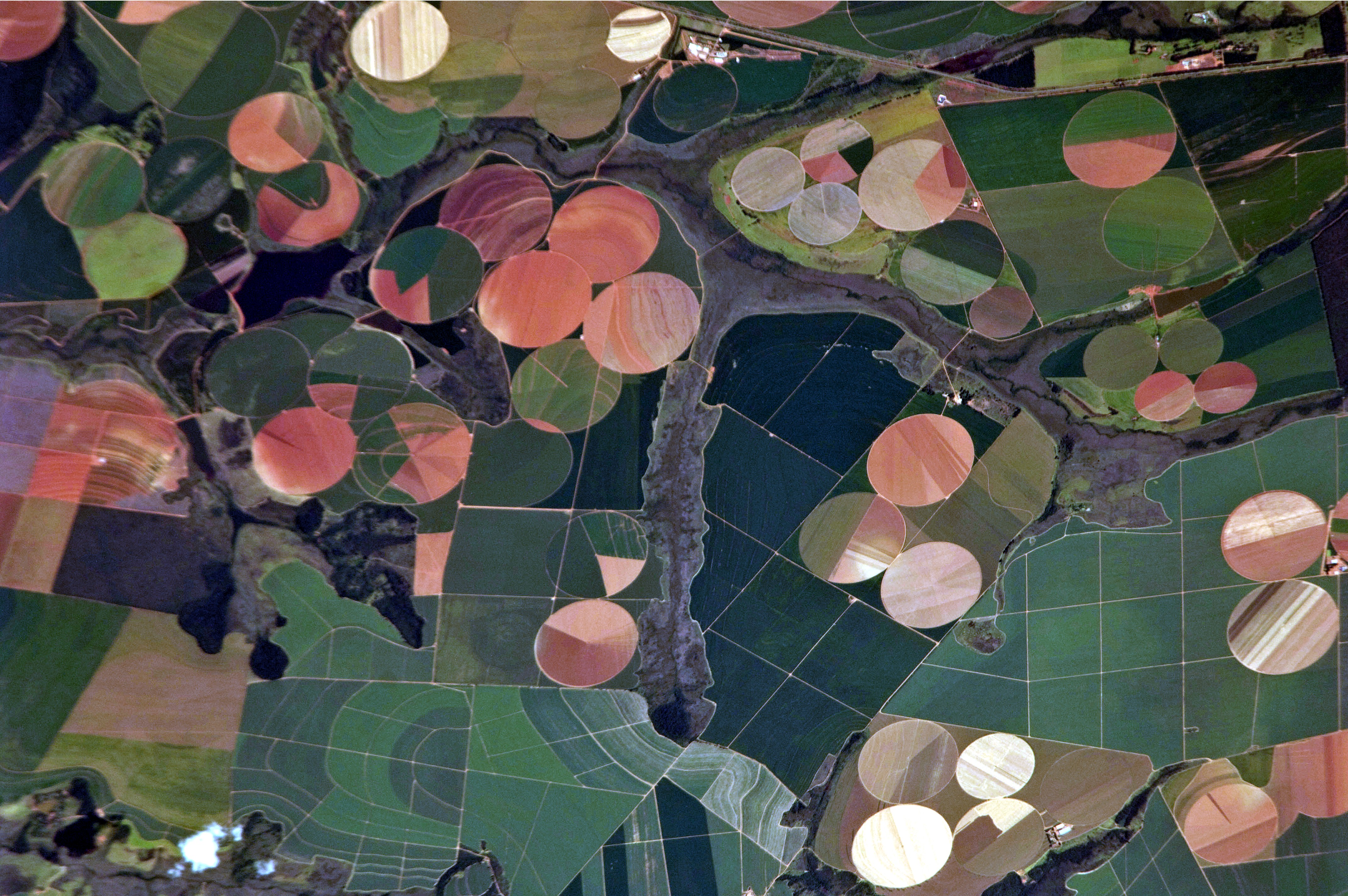
Diverse agricultural landscape in western Minas Gerais

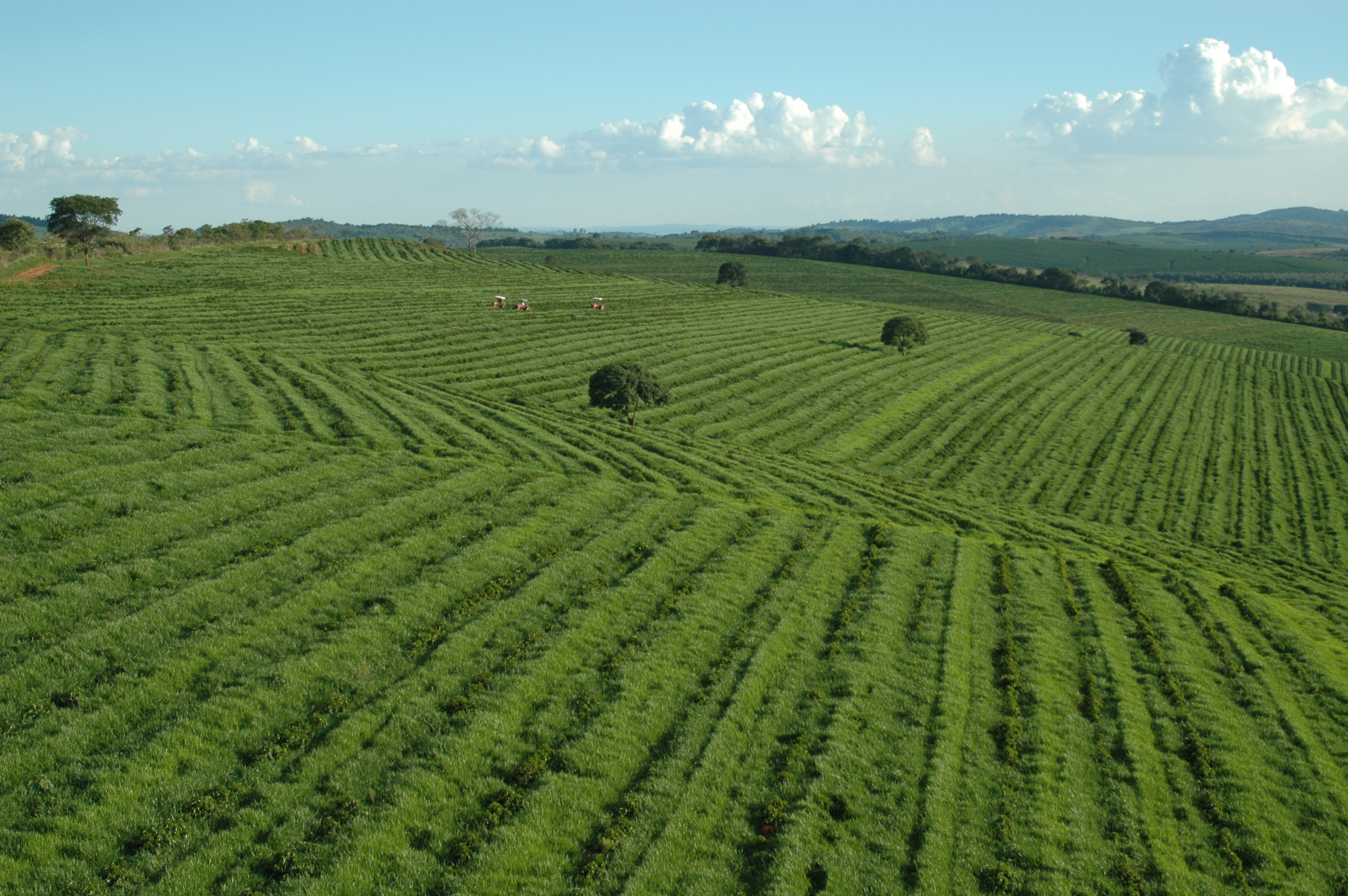
Coffee in Santo Antonio do Amparo

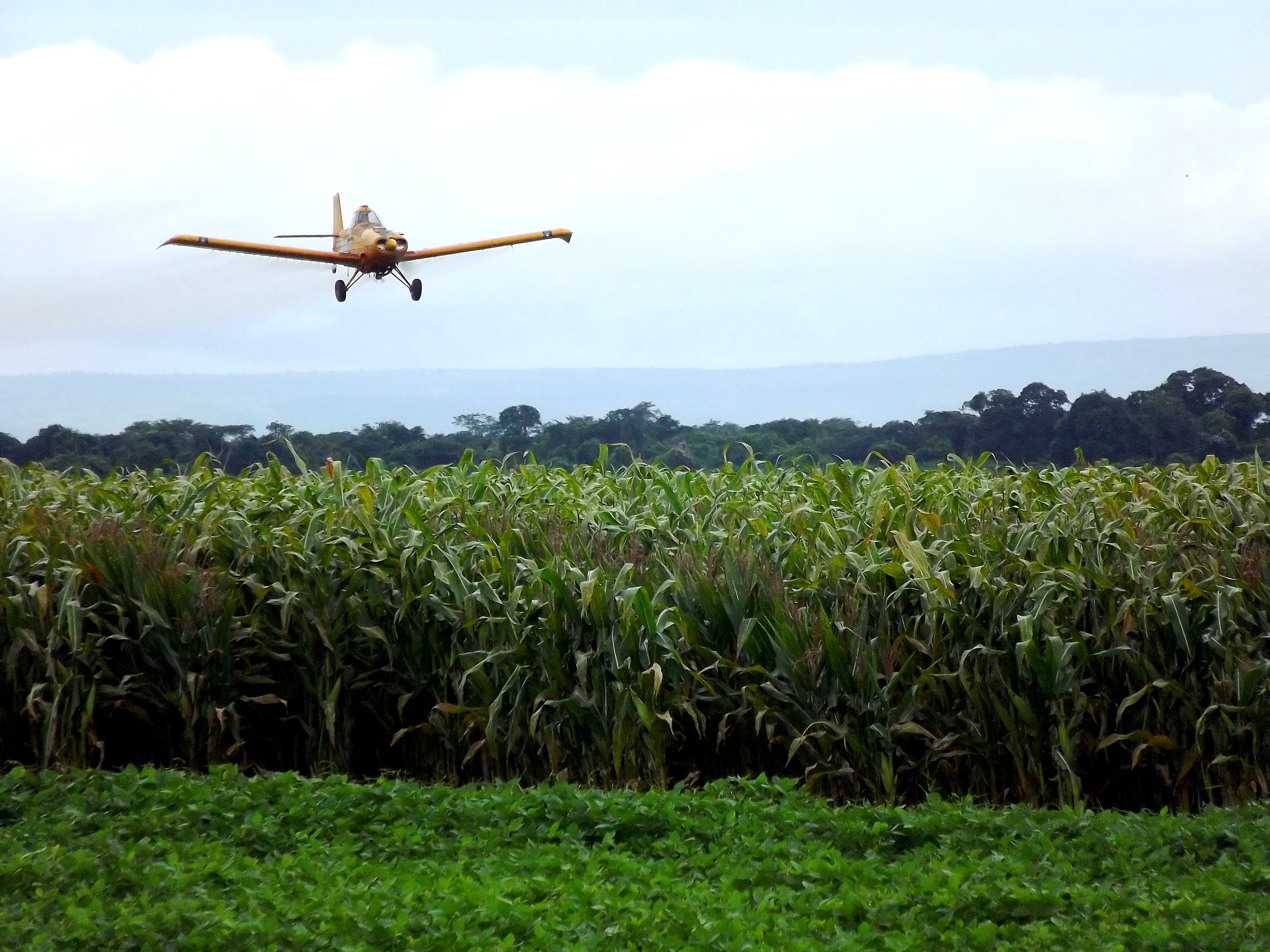
Corn plantation in Paracatu

The western part, the "Triângulo Mineiro", is less densely populated than the rest of the state, and it is now a focus of biotechnology investment, particularly on the cities of Uberlândia, Uberaba, Patos de Minas and Araguari, which includes leading research on cattle, soy and corn culture.

In agriculture, the state stands out in the production of coffee, sugar cane and soy, and also has large productions of orange, beans, sorghum, carrot, potato, banana, tangerine and strawberry, in addition to producing papaya, persimmon and cassava.

In 2020, Minas Gerais was the largest producer of Coffea arabica in the country, with 75% of the national total (1.7 million tons, or 35.2 million 60-kg bags). In 2017, Minas represented 54.3% of the total national production of coffee (first place).

The state was the third largest producer of sugar cane in Brazil in 2020, representing 12.4% of the total produced in the country, with 75.3 million tons.

The cultivation of soy, on the other hand, is increasing, however, it is not among the largest national producers of this grain. In the 2018–2019 harvest, Minas Gerais harvested 5 million tons (seventh place in the country). The state was the second largest producer of oranges in 2018, with a total of 948 thousand tons.

Minas Gerais is the second largest producer of beans in Brazil, with 17.2% of national production in 2020. In addition, it is one of the largest national producers of sorghum: around 30% of Brazilian production. It also ranks third in domestic production of cotton.

The state was the third largest producer of banana in 2018, with 736 thousand tons. Brazil was already the 2nd largest producer of the fruit in the world, currently in 3rd place, losing only to India and Ecuador.

In 2018, São Paulo and Minas Gerais were the largest producers of tangerine in Brazil. Minas was the 5th largest producer of papaya. About persimmon, Minas ranks third with 8%.

In 2019, in Brazil, there was a total production area of around 3 thousand hectares of strawberry. The largest producer is Minas Gerais, with approximately 1,500 hectares, cultivated in most municipalities in the extreme south of the state, in the Serra da Mantiqueira region, with Pouso Alegre and Estiva being the largest producers.

Regarding carrots, Brazil ranked fifth in the world ranking in 2016, with an annual production of around 760 thousand tons. In relation to the exports of this product, Brazil occupies the seventh world position. Minas Gerais is the largest producer in Brazil. Among the production centers in Minas Gerais are the municipalities of São Gotardo, Santa Juliana, and Carandaí. As for potatoes, the main national producer is the state of Minas Gerais, with 32% of the total produced in the country. In 2017, Minas Gerais harvested around 1.4 million tons of the product. In the production of cassava, Brazil produced a total of 17.6 million tons in 2018. Minas was the 12th largest producer in the country, with almost 500 thousand tons.

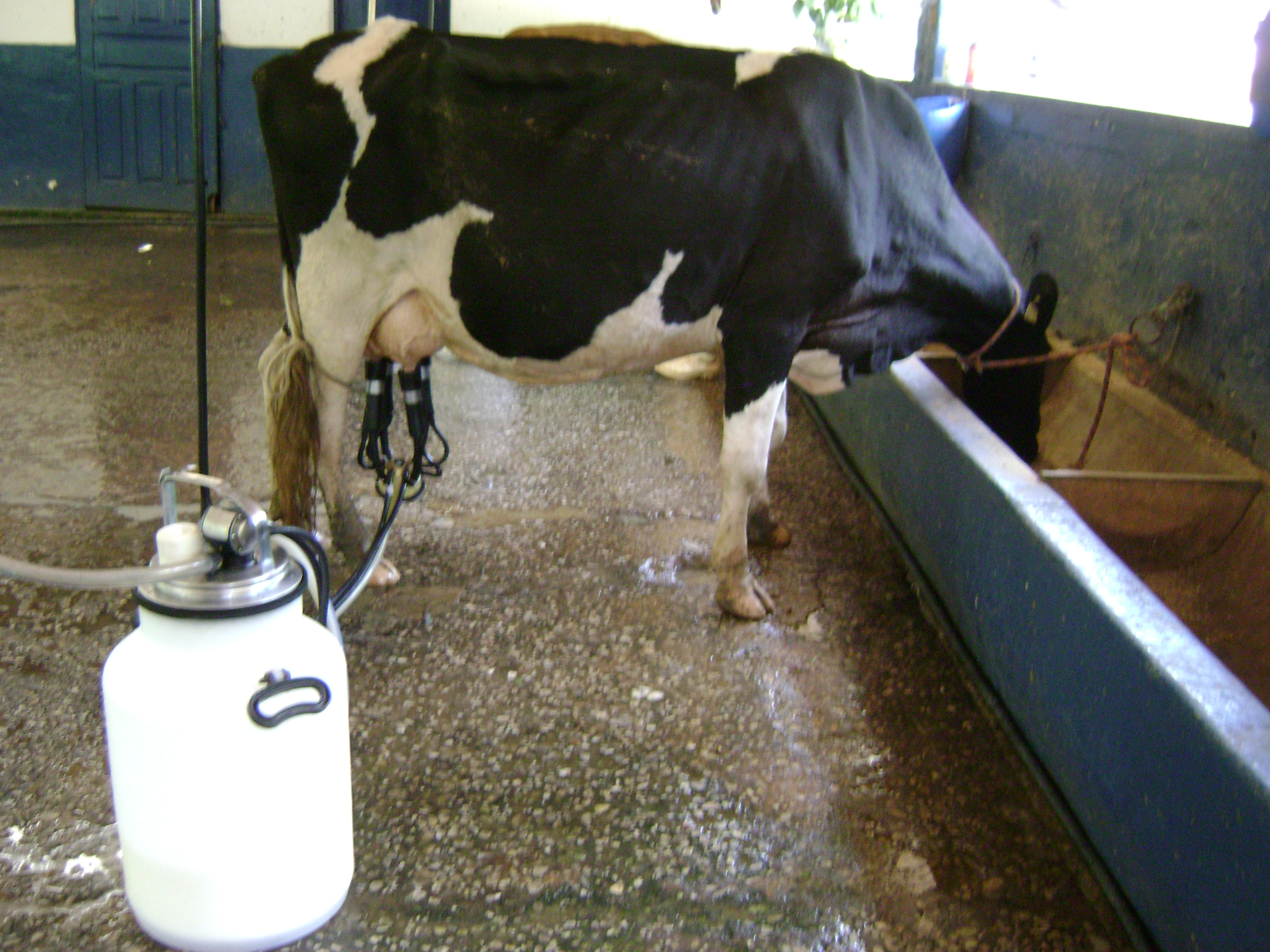
Milk extraction in Ouro Preto

Regarding the bovine herd, Minas has the second largest in the country. In 2015, it had a total of 25.8 million head of cattle.

Minas is the main producer of milk in Brazil, with the highest number of milked cows, responsible for 26.6% of production and 20.0% of total milking animals. The municipality of Patos de Minas was the second largest producer in 2017, with 193.7 million liters of milk. In 2015, the state produced 9 billion liters of milk.

In terms of pork meat, in 2017, Minas had the 4th largest herd in the country, with 5.2 million heads, 12.7% of the national total.

The state is the third largest producer of eggs in the country, with 9.3% of the Brazilian total in 2019 (which was 3.83 billion dozen).

=== Mineral extraction ===
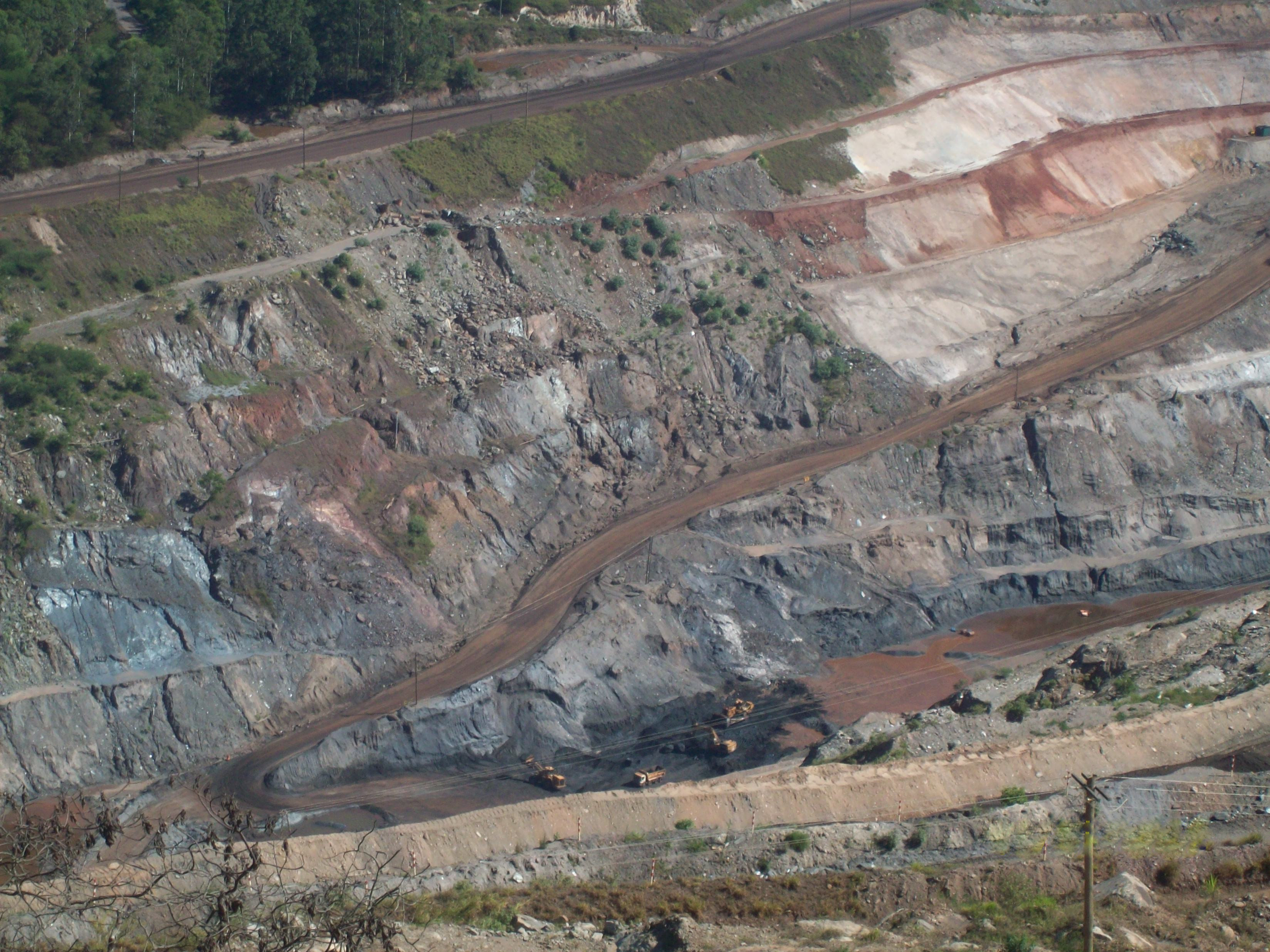
Iron mine in Itabira

The central region of the state (where the capital is located) has big reserves of iron (and to a lesser extent, gold) still being actively mined. In mineral production, in 2017, Minas Gerais was the country's largest producer of iron (277 million tons worth R$37.2 billion), gold (29.3 tons worth R$3.6 billion), zinc (400 thousand tons worth R$351 million) and niobium (in the form of hydrochloride) (131 thousand tons worth R$254 million). In addition, Minas Gerais was the second largest producer of bauxite (1.47 million tons at a value of R$105 million), the third of manganese (296 thousand tons worth R$32 million) and fifth of tin (206 tons worth R$4.7 million). There are also deposits of verdete slate, a glauconite-bearing mineral. Minas Gerais had 47.19% of the value of the production of minerals marketed in Brazil (first place), with R$41.7 billion.

The state has the largest production of various precious and semi-precious stones in the country. In aquamarine, Minas Gerais produces the most valuable stones in the world. In diamond, Brazil was the largest diamond producer in the world from 1730 to 1870, mining occurred for the first time in the Serra da Canastra, region of Diamantina, even lowering the price of stone in everyone due to overproduction. Minas Gerais continues to mine diamonds, in addition to having larger or smaller scale productions of agate, emerald, garnet, jasper and sapphire. Topaz and tourmaline stand out. In topaz, Brazil has the most valuable variety in the world, imperial topaz, only produced in Ouro Preto. Furthermore, the country is the world's leading producer of topaz. It's also among the world's largest tourmaline producers.

In the steel industry, Brazilian crude steel production was 32.2 million tons in 2019. Minas Gerais represented 32.3% of the volume produced in the period, with 10,408 million tons, being the largest steel center. Among the steel companies in Minas Gerais are Usiminas, ArcelorMittal Aços Longos (formerly Belgo Mineira), Açominas (belonging to Gerdau), Vallourec & Mannesmann and Aperam South America.

=== Manufacturing ===
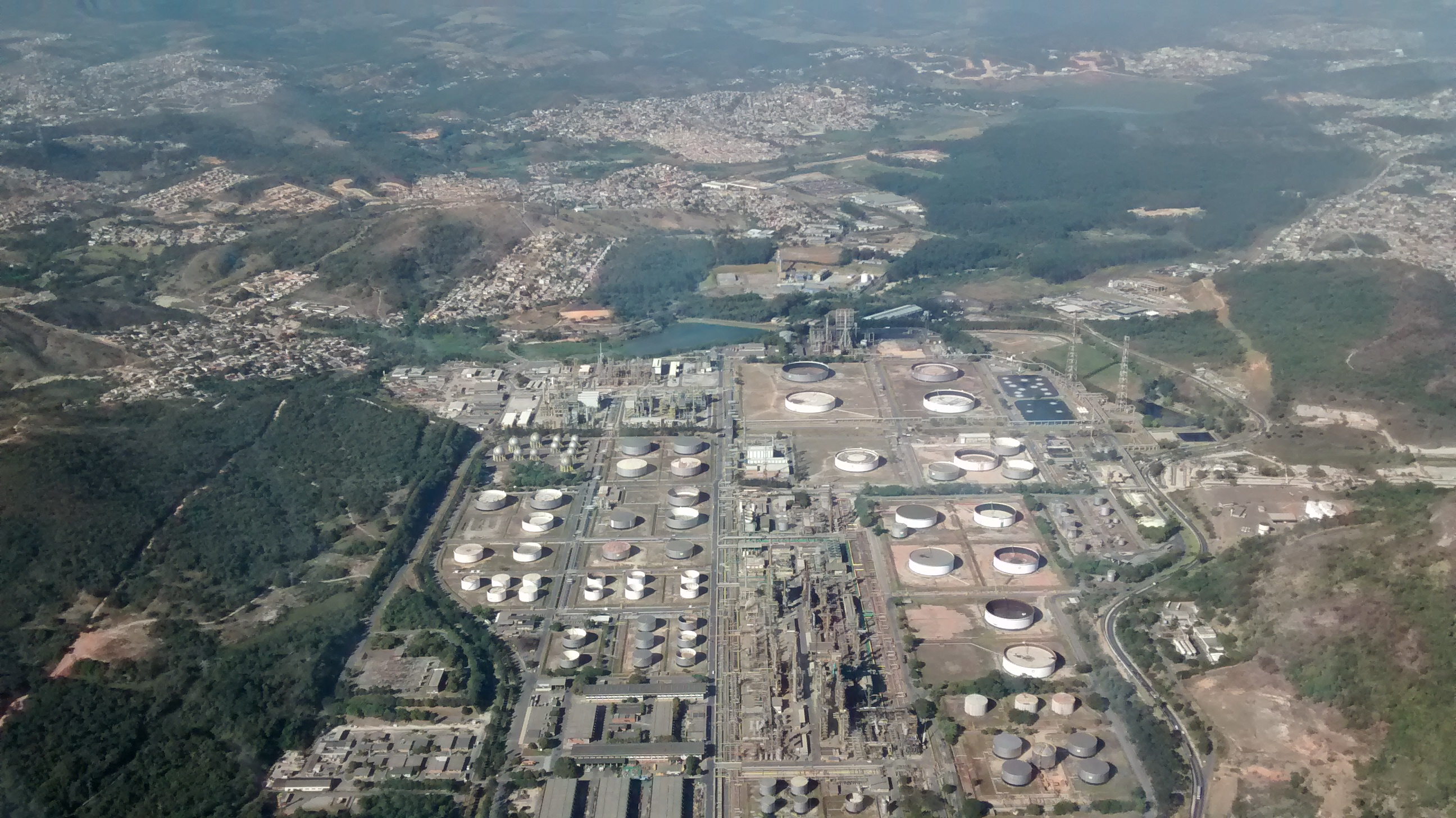
Oil refinery in Betim

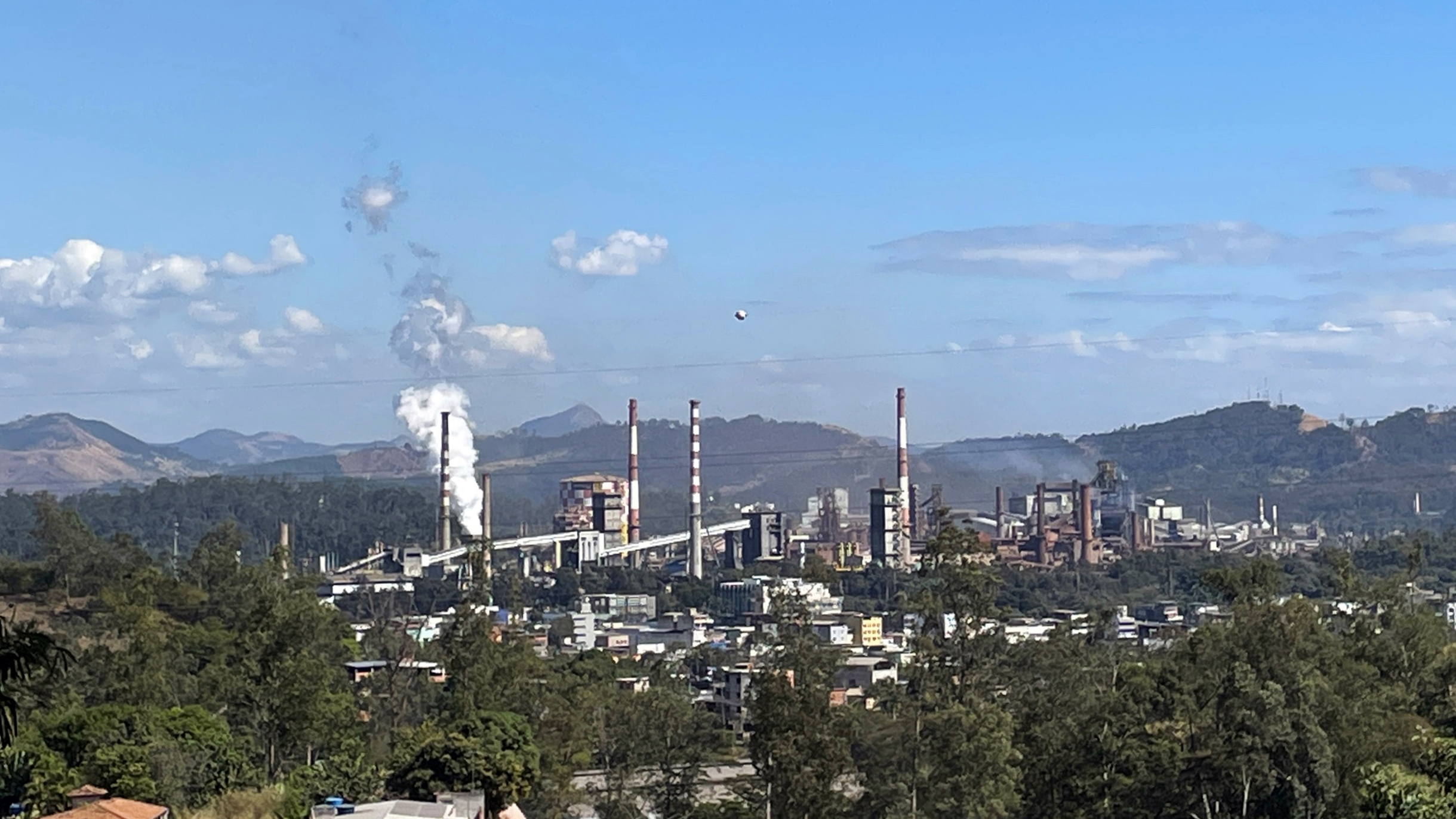
Usiminas plant in Ipatinga

There are also large companies installed the automotive industry, as manufacturers Fiat in Betim, Iveco in Sete Lagoas, Mercedes-Benz and suppliers of auto-parts, as Stola and Usiparts. In Brazil, the automotive sector represents about 22% of the industrial GDP. Minas Gerais is the third largest vehicle producer in the country, with a 10.7% participation in 2019.

In the electronics industry, the billing of industries in Brazil reached R$153 billion in 2019, around 3% of national GDP. The number of employees in the sector was 234.5 thousand people. Exports were $5.6 billion, and the country's imports were $32 billion. Brazil has two large electroelectronic production centers, located in the Metropolitan Region of Campinas, in the State of São Paulo, and in the Free Zone of Manaus, in the State of Amazonas. The country also has other smaller centers, one of them in the municipality of Santa Rita do Sapucaí, in Minas Gerais. In Santa Rita do Sapucaí, 8 thousand jobs are linked to the sector, with more than 120 companies. Most of them produce equipment for the telecommunications industry, such as decoders, including those used in the transmission of the digital television system. The company Multilaser has a plant in the city of Extrema.

In 2019 Brazil was the second-largest exporter of processed foods in the world, with a value of US$34.1 billion in exports. The income of the Brazilian food and beverage industry in 2019 was R$699.9 billion, which represented 9.7% of the country's gross domestic product. In 2015, the food and beverage industry in Brazil comprised 34,800 companies (not including bakeries), the vast majority of which were small. These companies employed more than 1.6 million workers, making the food and beverage industry the largest employer in the manufacturing industry. There are around 570 large companies in Brazil, which concentrate a good part of the total industry income. Minas Gerais created food companies of national importance, such as Itambé and Pif Paf Alimento.

In the footwear industry, in 2019 Brazil produced 972 million pairs. Exports were around 10%, reaching almost 125 million pairs. Brazil ranks fourth among world producers, behind China, India and Vietnam, and 11th among the largest exporters. Minas Gerais has a polo specialized in cheap shoes and sneakers in Nova Serrana. The city has around 830 industries, which in 2017 produced around 110 million pairs.

In the textile industry, Brazil, despite being among the 5 largest producers in the world in 2013, and being representative in the consumption of textiles and clothing, has little insertion in world trade. In 2015, Brazilian imports ranked 25th (US$5.5 billion). And in exports, it was only 40th in the world ranking. Brazil's share of world textile and clothing trade is only 0.3%, due to the difficulty of competing in price with producers from India and mainly from China. The gross value of production, which includes the consumption of intermediate goods and services, of the Brazilian textile industry corresponded to almost R $40 billion in 2015, 1.6% of the gross value of industrial production in Brazil. Minas Gerais has 8.51% (third largest production in the country).

=== Service industry ===
Tourism is also an important activity for the state: historical cities like Ouro Preto, Mariana, Sabará, Congonhas, Diamantina, Tiradentes, and São João del-Rei, are major attractions for visitors interested in their colonial architecture. Other cities, like Araxá, Poços de Caldas, Lambari, Caxambu, Lavras, and others, attract visitors interested in their mineral watersprings. Eco-tourism is a rising economic activity in the state, especially in localities situated on the several highlands that exist in Minas Gerais.

== Tourism ==
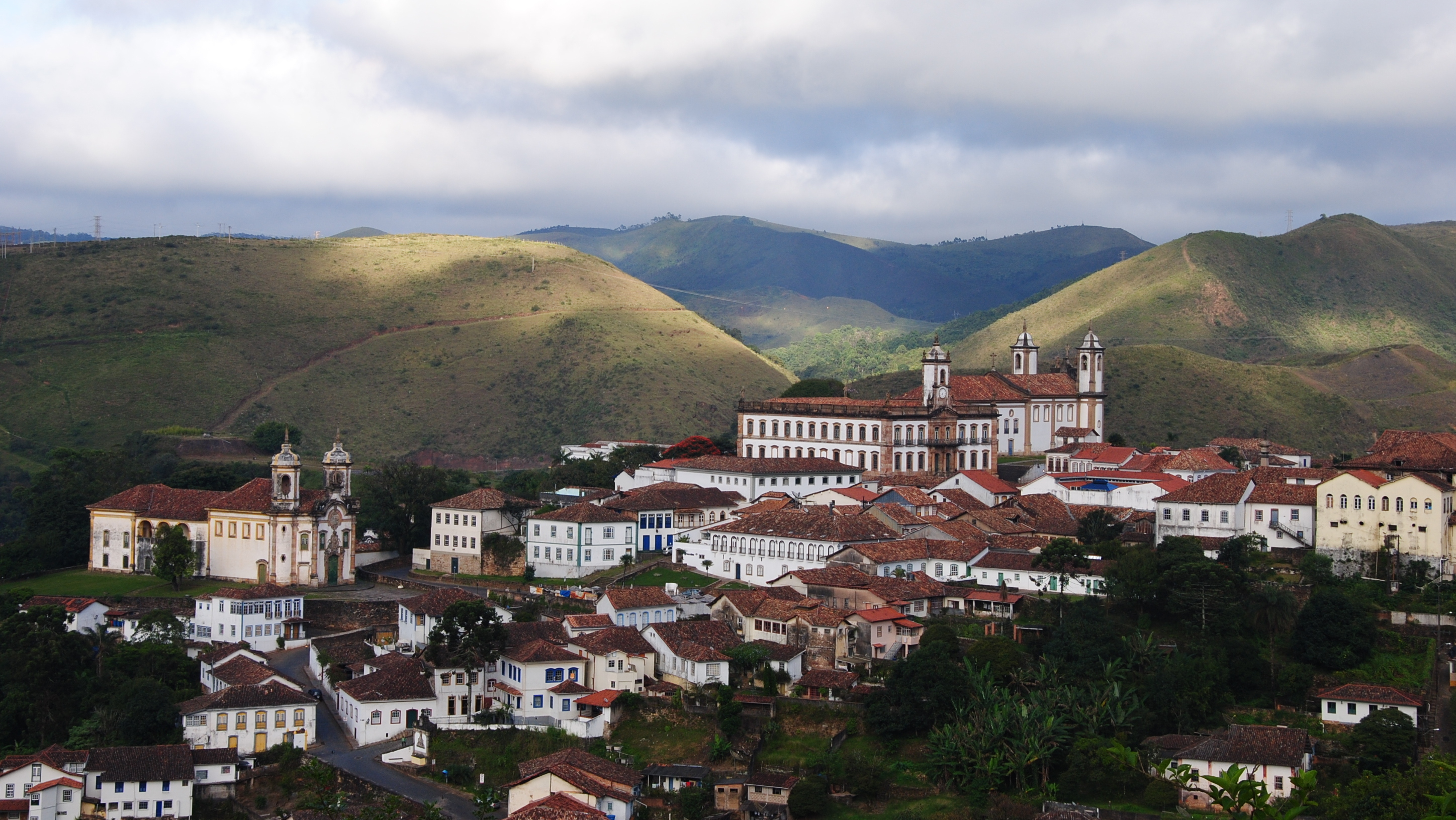
The colonial city of Ouro Preto, World Heritage Site, is one of the most popular destinations in Minas Gerais.

One of the most important tourist circuits in Minas Gerais is the Estrada Real, which passes through the old roads used to transport gold from the mines, connecting the central region of the state with the cities of Rio de Janeiro and Parati. The different itineraries of this circuit present historical, cultural and natural attractions for its visitors. Another noteworthy aspect of tourism in Minas Gerais includes visits to historic cities, which preserve colonial museum buildings, in addition to including museums and cultural spaces that reveal the past of these places. Of these cities, Ouro Preto stands out, where the Museum of Inconfidência is located.

The relief of the state, with an abundance of peaks and mountains (especially the great peaks), in addition to the large number of grottos and caves, natural and artificial rivers and lakes, and the richness of the state's fauna and flora, attract practitioners of ecotourism and adventure tourism. Another relevant segment is rural tourism, since Minas is one of the states with the most developments for this purpose. In the central region of the state, in addition to the historic cities and the capital, there are national parks such as Serra do Cipó, as well as the Inhotim Museum, which has one of the largest collections of contemporary art in the country. In the south of the state, there is the Circuito das Águas, known for its mineral spas. São Lourenço and Poços de Caldas are cities famous for their spas, hot springs and thermal baths.

It also highlights business tourism, which is booming, since in recent years important events of international projection have been held in the state. In particular, the city of Belo Horizonte stands out in this segment, attracting more and more fairs, congresses and meetings, which can be attributed to the city's infrastructure and important hotel network. Other cities in the interior (such as Juiz de Fora, Uberaba and Uberlândia) also offer options for holding large business events.

== Infrastructure ==
=== Highways ===
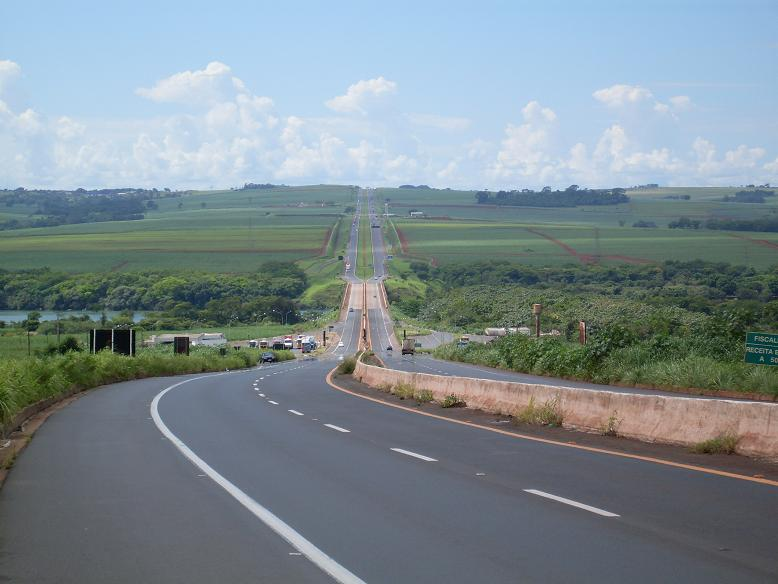
BR-050, border of São Paulo with the Triângulo Mineiro

As of November 2020, the state of Minas Gerais had, in addition to municipal highways, 39,738 km of state and federal highways, of which 29,255 were paved and 2,505 km were duplicate highways. The state has duplicate highways that leave the capital Belo Horizonte and connect it with São Paulo (BR-381) and Rio de Janeiro (BR-040), and in its western part (BR-050, BR-153 and BR-365 in the area known as the Triângulo Mineiro, between the states of São Paulo and Goiás, near Uberaba and Uberlândia). Some parts of BR-262 are also duplicated. The state, however, presents, in general, a duplication deficit, with sections of a single lane with movement above the saturation limit. Recently, in 2022, a project was created to grant BR-381 to private initiative, with the intention of doubling 215 km between Belo Horizonte, Ipatinga and Novo Oriente de Minas.

Minas Gerais is the Brazilian state that harbors the highest mileage of highways. The state highway network is 269,545 kilometers, of which only 11,396 on federal roads and 21,472 on state highways and state coincide, corresponding to all other municipal roads. Because of its central position, the state is crossed by the most important national highways, like BR-116 (Rio-Bahia), BR-040 (Rio-Brasília) and others. Many of the most important Brazilian routes cross the state and, for this reason, it counts the greater proportion of car accidents per capita.

=== Railways ===
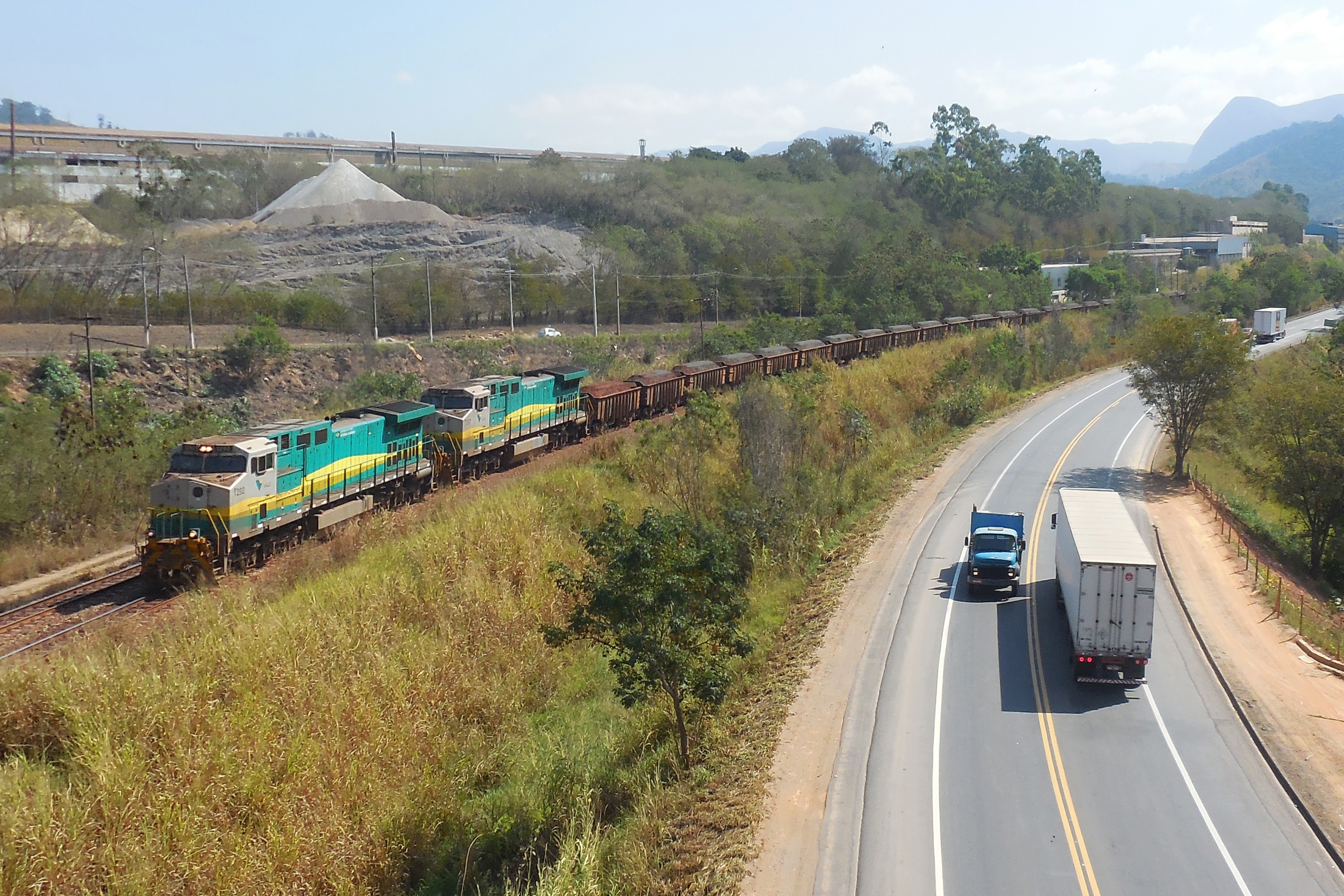
Vale train carrying iron ore in Timóteo

Rail transport has been around since the 19th century, when the Central Railway of Brazil was built in 1860. In 1874, the Leopoldina Railway was inaugurated. In 1880, the Estrada de Ferro Oeste de Minas was founded, and in the following decades, several other railways were opened in the territory of Minas Gerais. Starting in the 1960s, railways began to be replaced by roads due to the growing demand for the car fleet, which resulted in the closure of some railways and branches. In the 1990s, the entire national railway system was privatized, disabling the remaining passenger services on some local lines. However, there are still active railways that cross Minas Gerais, today used only for freight, such as the old Central do Brasil Railway, Leopoldina Railway, Western Minas Railway, and Steel Railway, operated by dealers. Atlantic Vitória a Minas Railway (EFVM) is responsible for transporting the production of Vale and other state companies to the port of Tubarão in Vitória, Espírito Santo, and also operates the only daily passenger train in Brazil that runs long distances, between Vitória and Belo Horizonte, which connects other cities that also have stations.

=== Airport ===
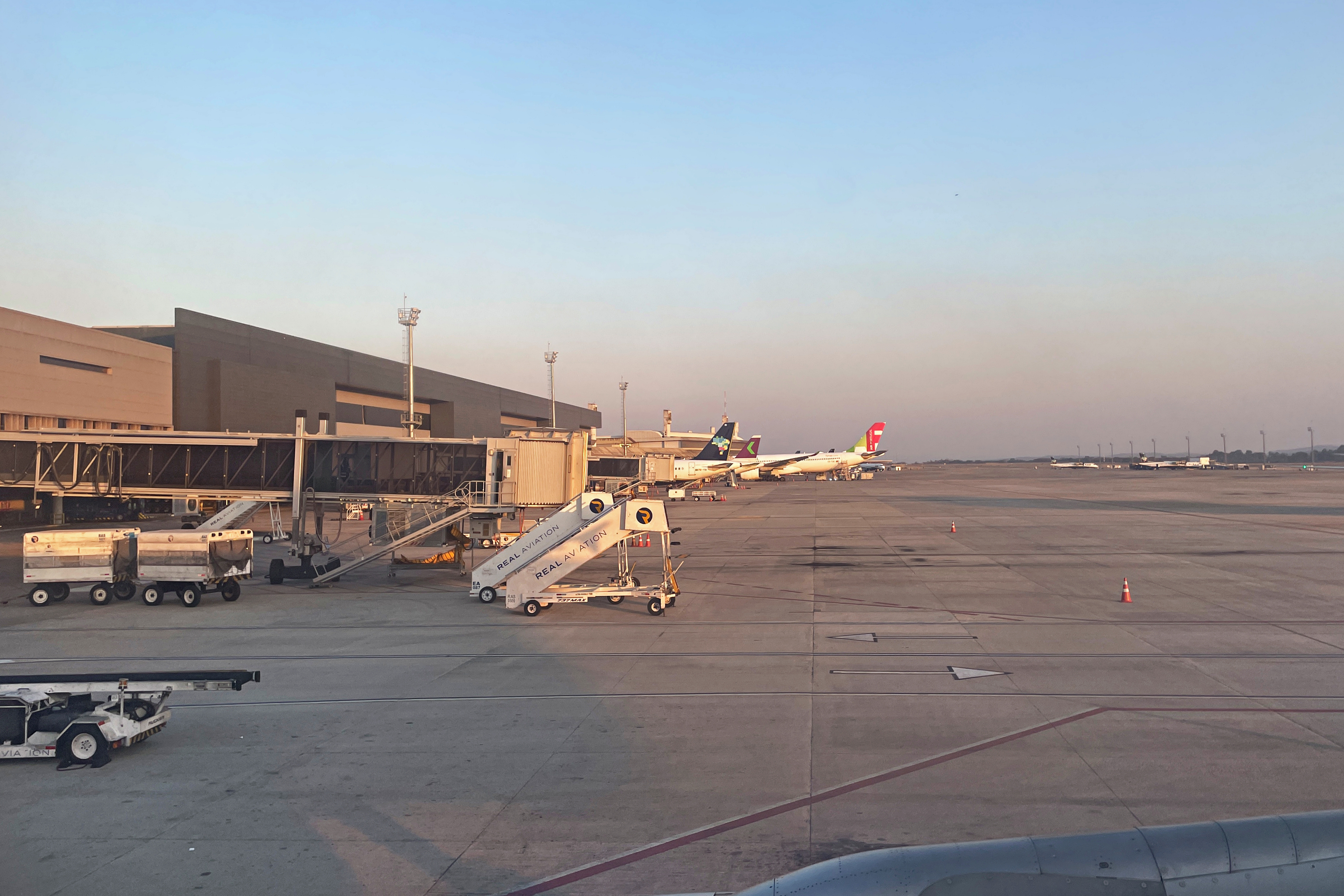
Confins International Airport

Tancredo Neves International Airport is located in the municipalities of Lagoa Santa and Confins, 38 km (23 mi) from Belo Horizonte, and was opened in January 1984. It was planned from the start for future expansion in steps to meet growing demand. The airport has one of the lowest rates of shutdown for bad weather in the country. However, the Confins airport was not using much of its capacity until 2005, when it was decided that a large part of the Pampulha Airport flights (which is smaller and located inside Belo Horizonte's urban area) would move to Confins.

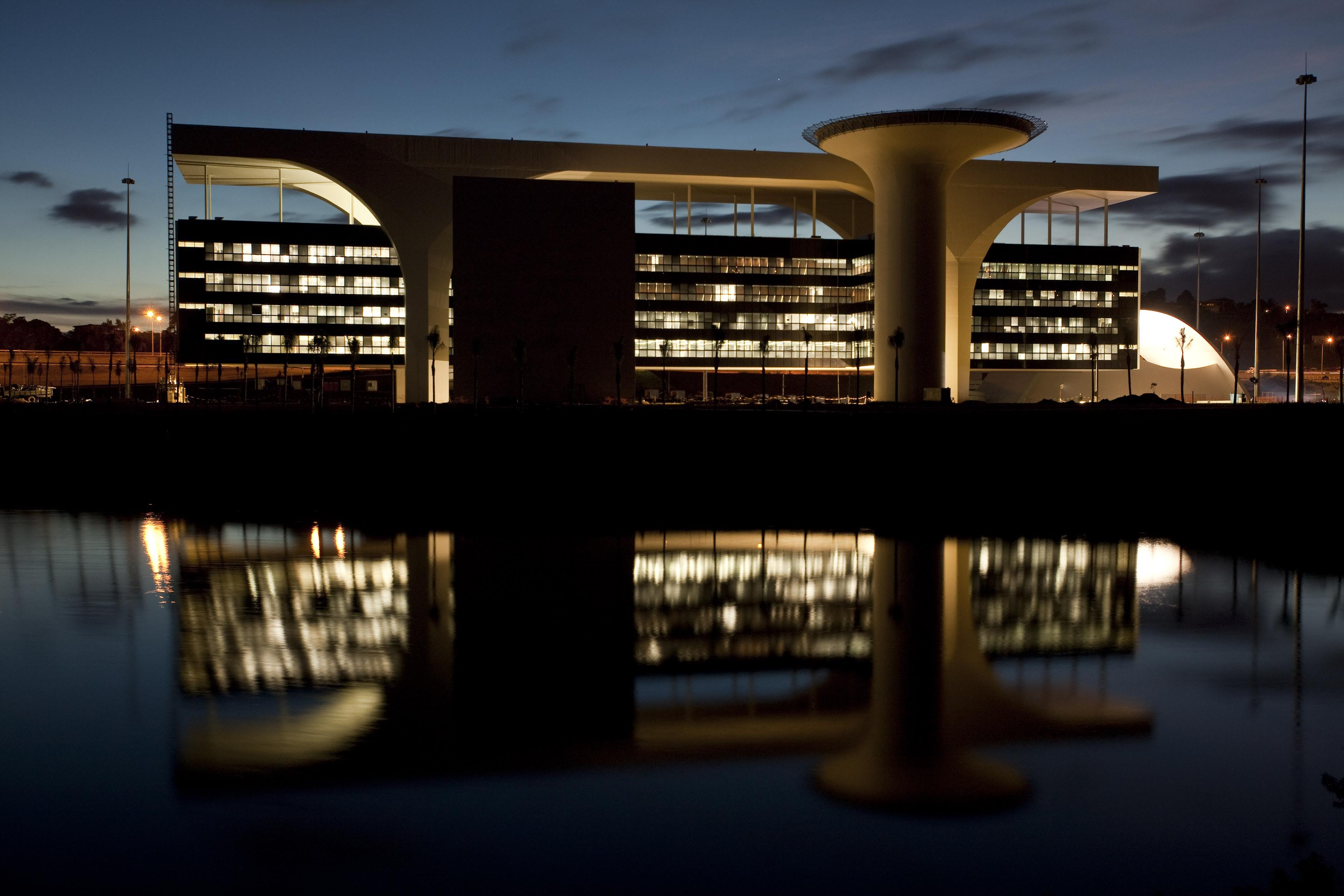
Palácio Tiradentes, seat of the government of Minas Gerais

=== Administrative center ===
The Cidade Administrativa de Minas Gerais (officially Cidade Administrativa Presidente Tancredo Neves), also known in English as the Administrative City of Minas Gerais, is the seat of the executive branch of the state government.

Designed by Oscar Niemeyer, the complex was inaugurated on 4 March 2010, the centenary of the birth of Tancredo Neves. It was built in Serra Verde, in northern Belo Horizonte, to move state secretariats and public agencies from scattered offices in the capital to a single government campus.

The complex occupies 804,000 m^{2} (199 acres) and has 265,000 m^{2} (2,850,000 sq ft) of built area. It currently houses 41 state bodies and over 17,000 public servants. Its main buildings are the Palácio Tiradentes, the Minas and Gerais office buildings and the Auditório JK. At the time of its inauguration, the Palácio Tiradentes was the world's largest suspended concrete building, with a free span of 147 m (482 ft) and a width of 26 m (85 ft).

=== Education ===
The "education" factor of Minas Gerais' HDI reached the mark of 0.762 in 2021 — the seventh highest in the country — while the illiteracy rate of people aged 15 and over was 4.8% in 2022, the eleventh best national percentage, but the worst in the Brazilian Southeast. Based on the 2011 Basic Education Development Index (IDEB) report, Minas Gerais obtained the highest rate among students in the 5th year of elementary school among Brazilian states — 5.9 —, the third highest value in the 9th year — 4.6, second only to Santa Catarina and São Paulo — and the fourth highest among 3rd year high school students — 3.9, second to Santa Catarina, Paraná and São Paulo. In the 2013 general classification of the National Secondary Education Examination (ENEM), five schools from Minas Gerais were among the ten best in the national ranking, which also included the only school located in a city outside the capital.

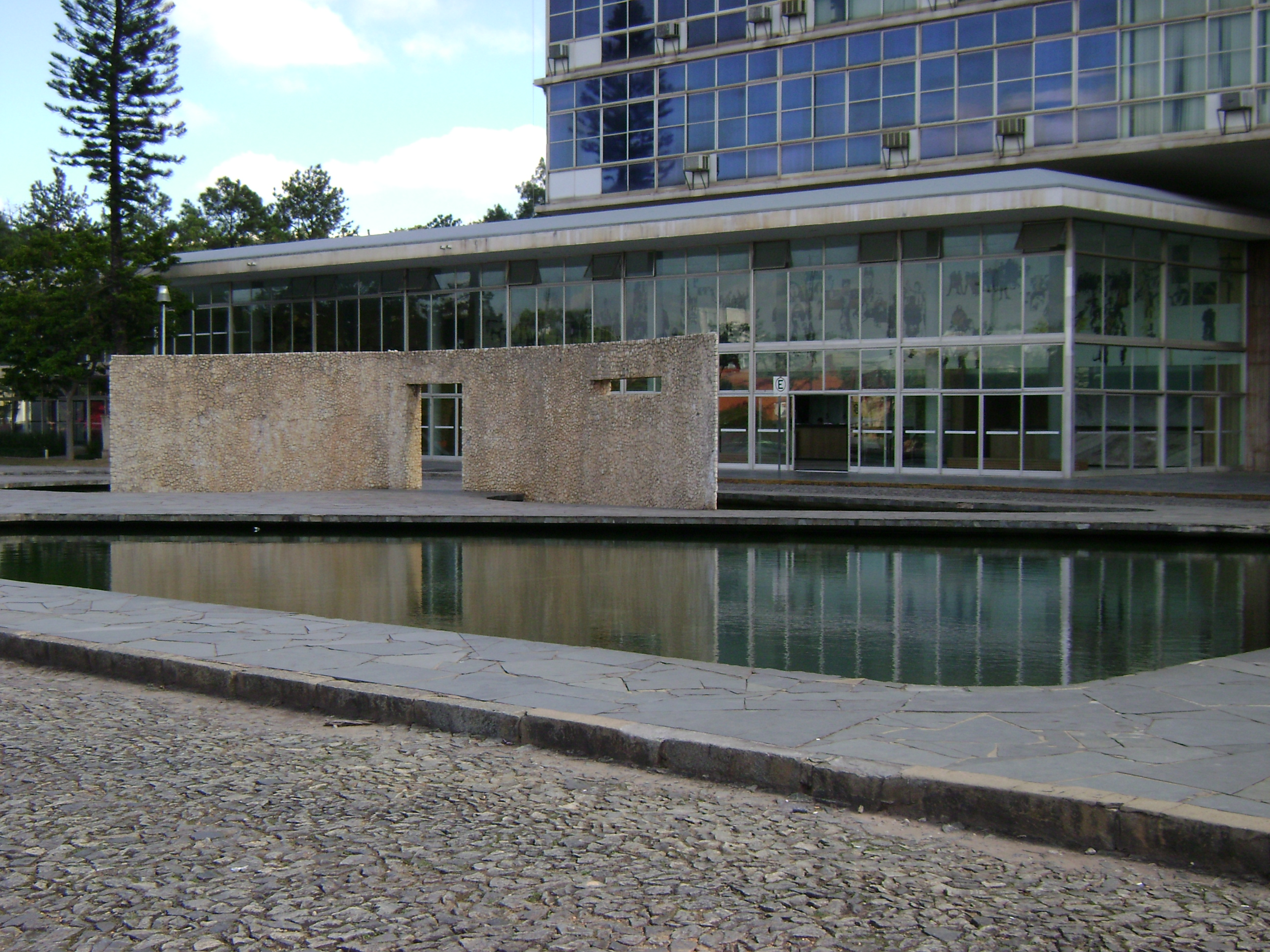
Partial view of the rectory building of the Federal University of Minas Gerais (UFMG)

With 11,831 primary education establishments, 7,431 pre-school units and 2,979 secondary schools, the state's education network is one of the most extensive in Brazil. According to 2010 census data, 5,681,163 people attended daycare, preschool, literacy classes, primary, secondary, and higher education. This includes 179,819 in daycare, 3,500,499 in primary and secondary education, and 715,484 in higher education. 12,080,382 people did not attend school, with 1,835,785 having never attended.

Among the many higher education institutions, the Federal University of Minas Gerais (UFMG) stands out, ranked as the 7th best university in Latin America in 2024 and, together with the Federal University of Viçosa (UFV), the Federal University of Triângulo Mineiro (UFTM) and Federal University of Lavras (UFLA), is among the best in Brazil according to the General Course Index, from the Ministry of Education. The Federal University of Uberlândia (UFU) also stands out in the state, it ranked 4th best in Minas Gerais, and 28th in Brazil, ahead of UFLA, UFOP and UFTM, according to data of the ranking of Brazilian universities by Folha de S. Paulo, in 2016. Minas Gerais is the state with the largest number of federal higher education institutions in the country, housing 20 institutions, including 8 federal institutes, 1 federal center and 11 federal universities. It also has two state institutions: the State University of Minas Gerais and the State University of Montes Claros. In addition to around 350 private and philanthropic colleges and universities present in more than 240 municipalities.

== Sports ==
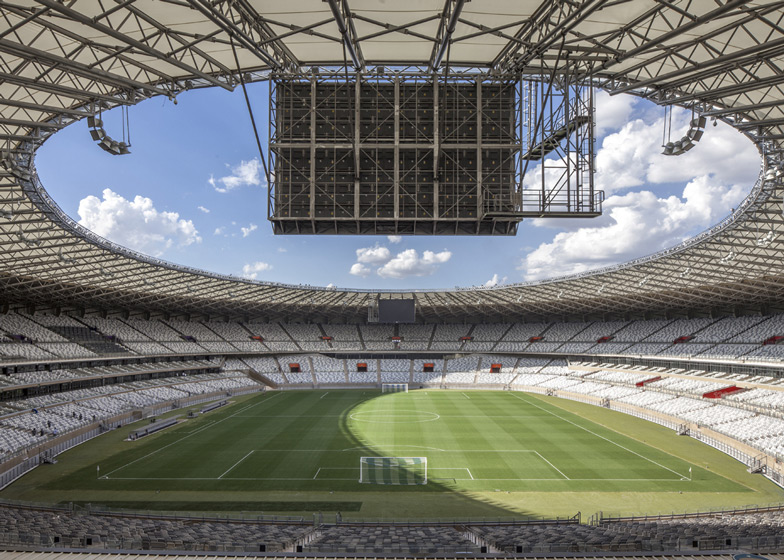
Mineirão stadium in Belo Horizonte

As in the rest of Brazil, football is the most popular sport among locals. Pelé, widely considered the best footballer of all time, was born in the Minas city of Três Corações. Belo Horizonte is home to two of the most successful teams in the country, and the city also has one of the biggest football stadiums in the world, the Mineirão, opened in 1965. Reopened after renovations in 2013, Mineirão was chosen as one of the venues for the 2014 FIFA World Cup, and also the soccer tournament of the 2016 Summer Olympics. Another stadium in Belo Horizonte, Independência Stadium, was one of the venues of the 1950 FIFA World Cup, where it hosted a legendary upset of the United States team over England.

The biggest teams of Belo Horizonte and Minas as a whole are Atlético Mineiro, founded in 1908 and nicknamed "Galo" (rooster) after its mascot, and Cruzeiro, founded in 1921 as "Palestra Itália" by the members of the local Italian community. Atlético is the record winner of its state championship, the Campeonato Mineiro with 41 titles, the Campeonato Brasileiro Série A title in the 1971 season, two Copa CONMEBOL titles in 1992 and 1997 (the predecessor of the current Copa Sudamericana), one Copa Libertadores title in 2013 and a Copa do Brasil title in 2014. Cruzeiro have won 36 state championships, won four Campeonato Brasileiro Série A titles, the 1966 Taça Brasil (beating Pelé's Santos in the final, a treble in 2003 (after winning the 2003 Campeonato Brasileiro Série A title, the 2003 Copa do Brasil, and the 2003 Campeonato Mineiro title), and most recently won both the 2013 and 2014 Campeonato Brasileiro Série A and Brazilian Cup of 2017 and 2018. Cruzeiro has been one of Brazil's most successful clubs since the 1960s, being elected the most successful Brazilian team of the 20th century by IFFHS. Its titles include 6 editions of the Brazilian Cup, 4 Brazilian Championships and 2 Copa Libertadores in 1976 and 1997, and was the first club of former two-time World Cup and Ballon d'Or winner Ronaldo. Atlético Mineiro also have notable players such as former goalkeeper Cláudio Taffarel, who helped Brazil to the 1994 FIFA World Cup title. Both clubs however, have been relegated from the Campeonato Brasileiro Série A in previous seasons, notably Cruzeiro in 2019 and Atlético Mineiro in 2005.

Belo Horizonte is also home to América Mineiro, founded in 1912 current owner of Independência and considered the third force of the state. While the team's struggles combined with the popularization of Atlético and Cruzeiro reduced América's supporters, the team has won both the second and third levels of the Brazilian Championship, the Sul-Minas Cup in 2000, and 16 state championships, including a record dynasty of ten tournaments between 1916 and 1925. Both Villa Nova of Nova Lima and Betim Esporte Clube (when it was known as Ipatinga Futebol Clube) have won the state championship and been in Série A of the Brazilian league.

Besides football, Belo Horizonte has one of the largest attendances at volleyball matches in the whole country. Multisport club Minas Tênis Clube had its male and female teams win the Brazilian Superleague of Volleyball, with Contagem-based Sada Cruzeiro also winning the male tournament. Sada-Cruzeiro also won the FIVB World Club Championship two times in last 3 years, being one of the most successful volleyball team in the world. The Brazil national volleyball team has had some of its highest attendance numbers at Mineirinho, an arena located near the Mineirão stadium. On basketball, both Minas and Uberlândia's Uberlândia Tênis Clube are in the national tournament.

In the state, tennis players Marcelo Melo and Bruno Soares were born, who were respectively the nº1 and nº2 of the world in doubles; Ronaldo da Costa, former holder of the marathon world record; Olympic medalists such as Maicon de Andrade en taekwondo, Marcus Mattioli in swimming, Moysés Blás and Cláudia Pastor in basketball; Adenízia da Silva, Ana Carolina da Silva, Ana Flávia Sanglard, Ana Paula Henkel, Anderson Rodrigues, Camila Brait, Érika Coimbra, Fabiana Claudino, Gabriela Guimarães, Giovane Gavio, Hilma, Marcia Fu, Xandó, Maurício Souza, Lucarelli, Sassá, Sheilla Castro, Talmo and Walewska in volleyball; so as World Championship medalists like André Cordeiro, Henrique Barbosa, Larissa Oliveira, Nicolas Oliveira, Rodrigo Castro and Teófilo Ferreira in swimming.

== Communications ==
As of April 2007, there are 11.3 million mobile phones and 4.2 million telephones in the country.

Minas Gerais (MG) cities area phone codes (called DDD in Brazil) are from 31 to 38.

== Culture ==
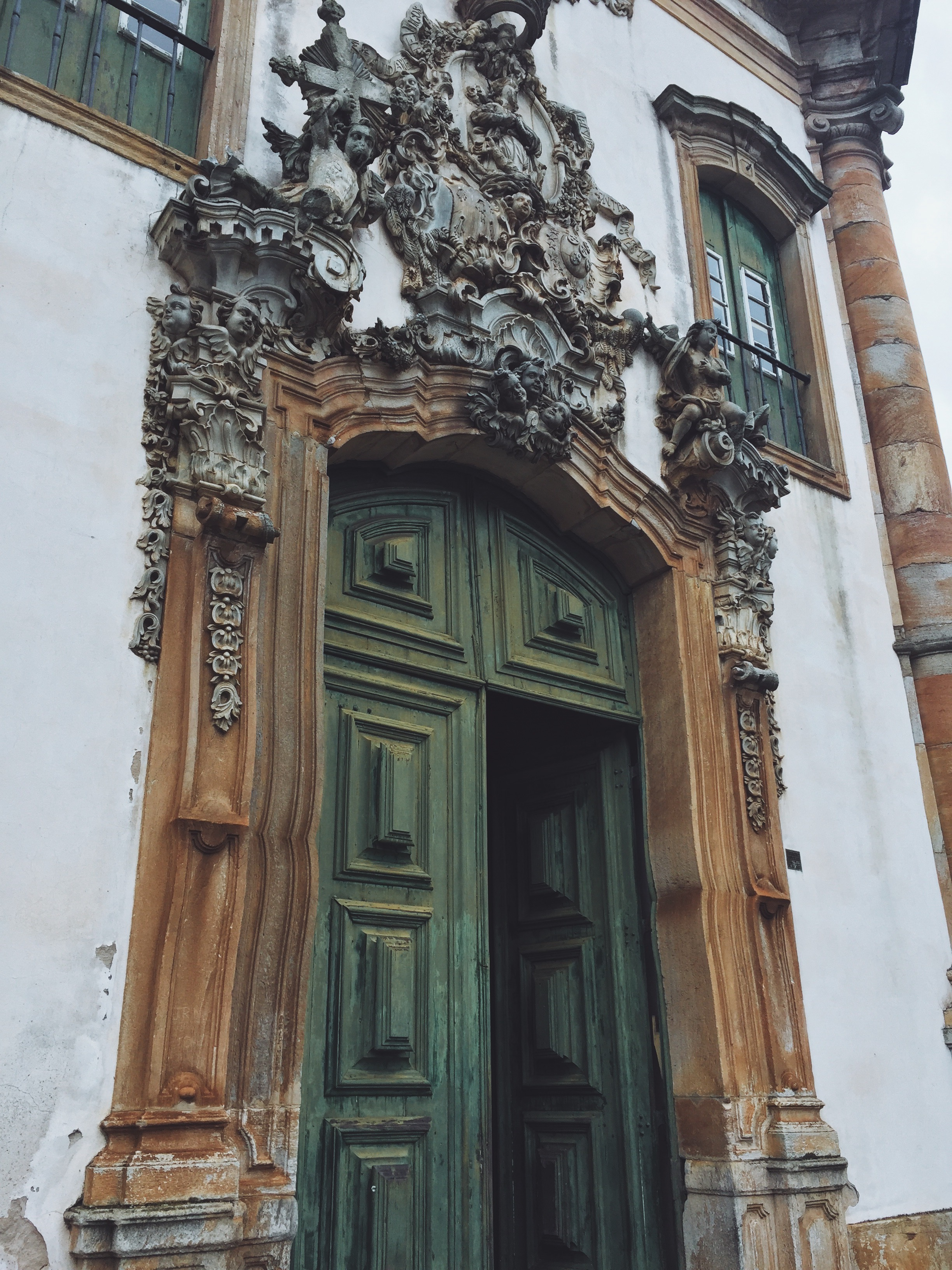
Door of the Church of São Francisco de Assis in Ouro Preto, with work by Aleijadinho in the Brazilian Baroque style

Minas Gerais may be called Deep Brazil by analogy with France profonde. It has a more native style than cosmopolitan São Paulo, a more traditional one than Rio de Janeiro, and is more Portuguese than the South and São Paulo with their influx of Italians and other Central Europeans, the North with its Native Americans, or the Northeast with its heavy Afro-Brazilian influence.

=== People ===
People born and raised in Minas Gerais, commonly known as Mineiros, speak regional varieties of Brazilian Portuguese with distinctive accents. These varieties vary across the state, with some sharing characteristics with the speech of neighbouring states, including São Paulo, Rio de Janeiro, and Bahia.

Cultural descriptions of Mineiros have sometimes characterized them as reserved, prudent, amicable, and family-oriented; such descriptions vary and should be attributed to their sources where appropriate.

Minas Gerais has a diverse religious population, including Roman Catholics, Evangelical, and adherents of Spiritism. Spiritism has had a notable presence in the state, in part because of the influence of Chico Xavier, a prominent Brazilian spiritist who lived much of his life in Minas Gerais.

=== Dialects ===
The most spoken dialect (48,6%) in the state is mineiro. It is the dialect spoken in the capital, Belo Horizonte, and the historical cities (Ouro Preto, Mariana, Sabará, Diamantina, Tiradentes, São João del-Rei etc.). The vernacular, dialectical speech of Minas Gerais is playfully and informally referred to—particularly with regard to its most idiosyncratic features—as mineirês.

Other dialects are caipira, spoken near the states of São Paulo and Goiás by 33,0%, and baiano, spoken in the Northern region – near Bahia – by 18,4%.

=== Museums ===
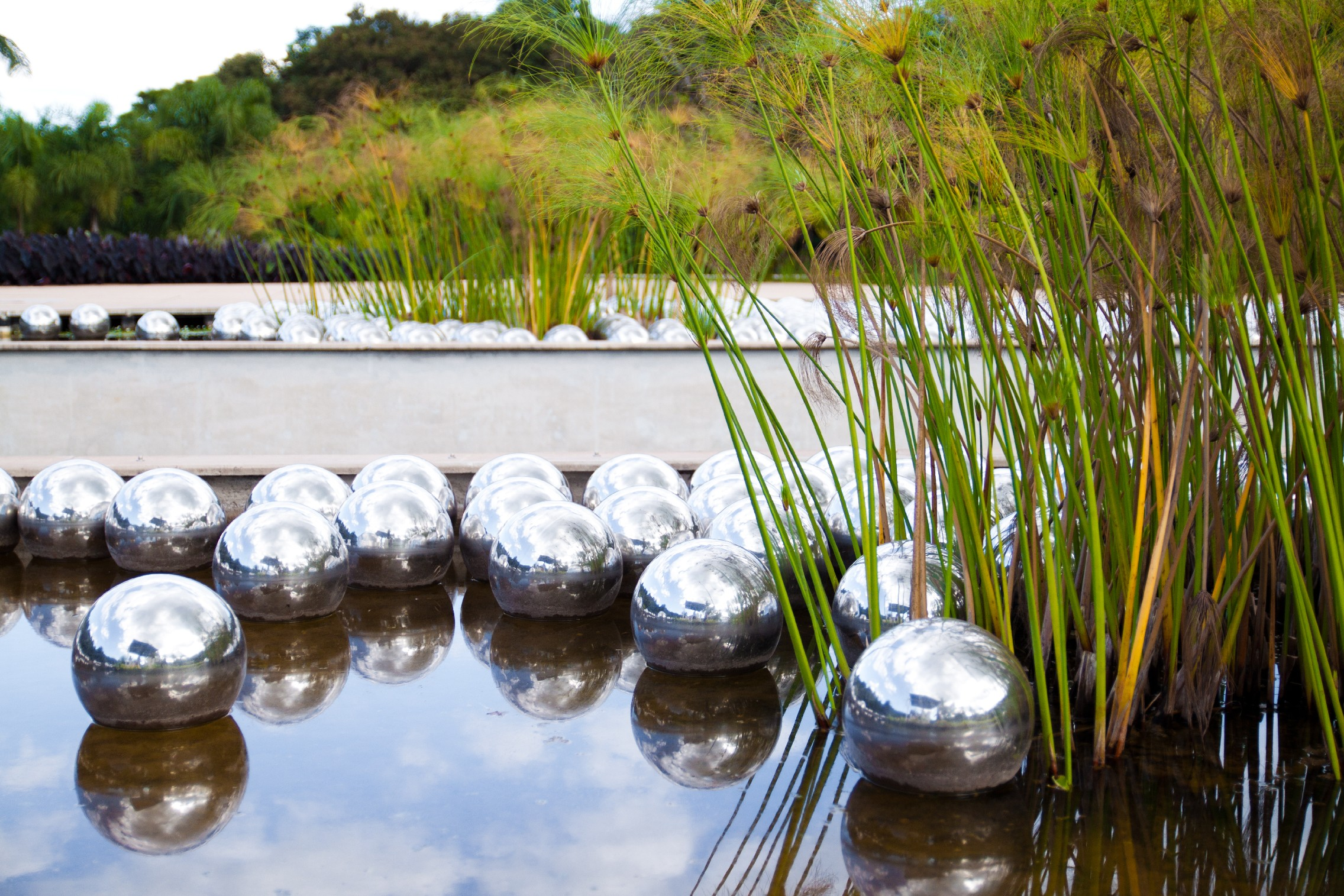
Yayoi Kusama at the Inhotim in Brumadinho

Mariano Procópio Museum, in Juiz de Fora, and Centro de Arte Contemporânea Inhotim, in Brumadinho, are among the most important cultural institutions.

=== Cuisine ===
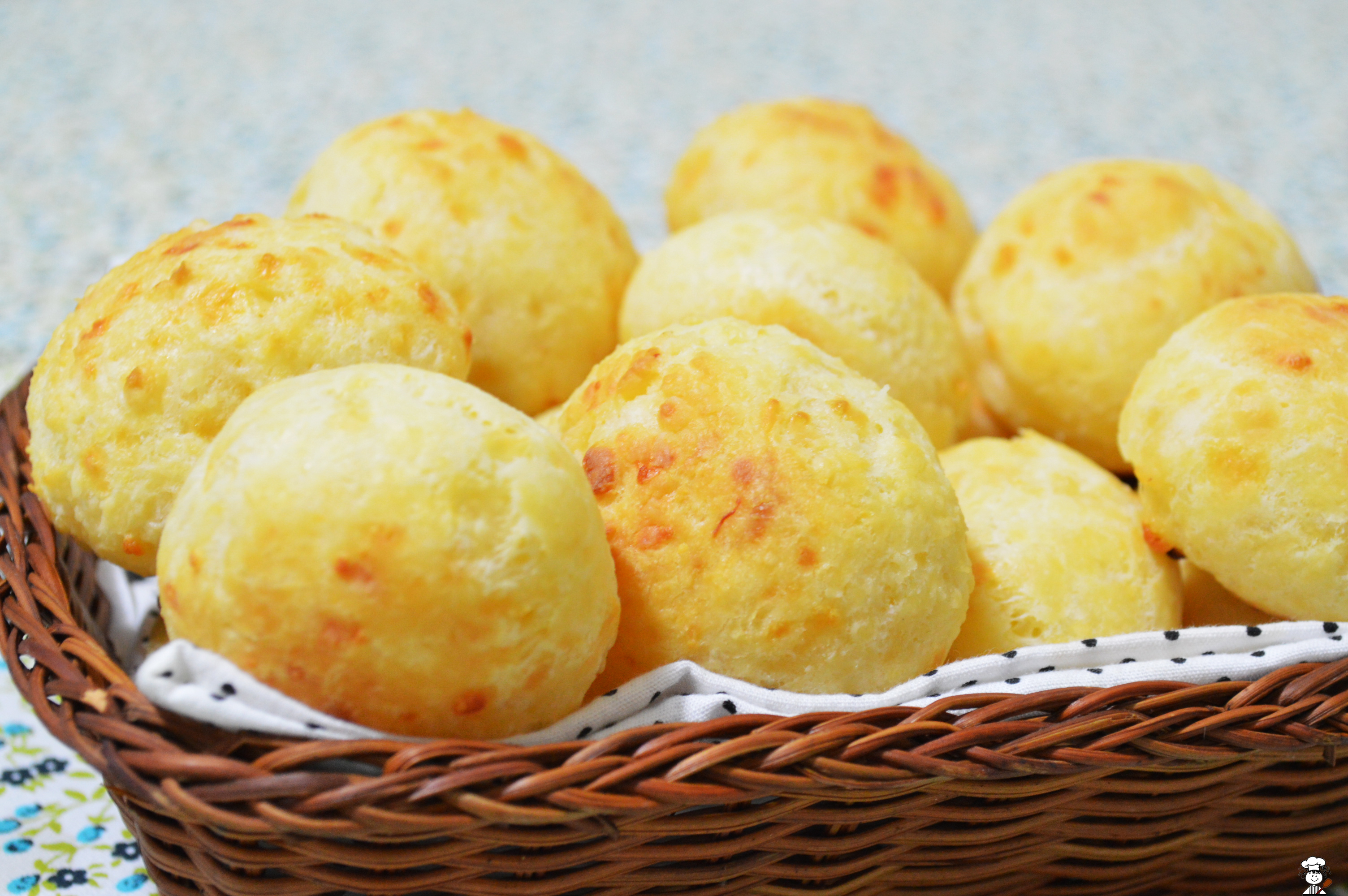
Pão de Queijo is a traditional snack from Minas Gerais

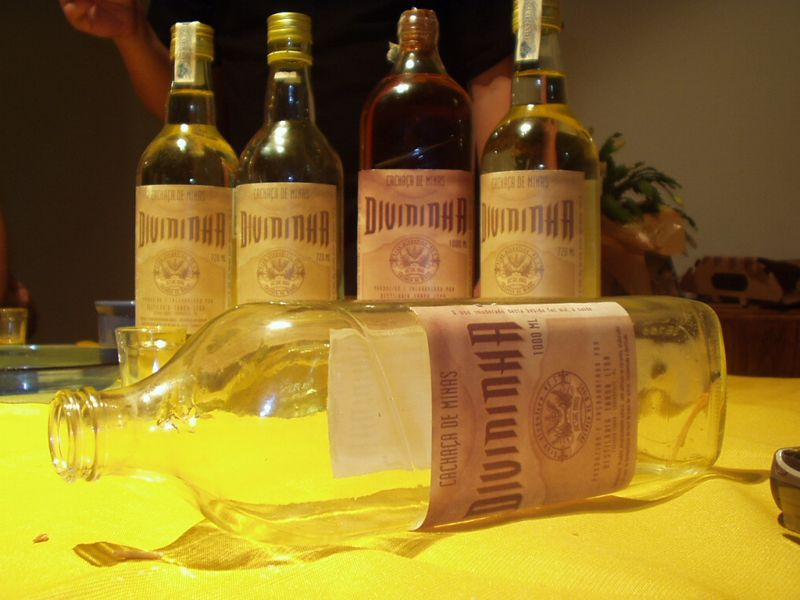
Cachaça, typical drink from Minas Gerais, which has hundreds of artesanal brands

The cultural basis of its cuisine is the small farmhouse, and many of the dishes are prepared using locally produced vegetables and meats, especially chicken and pork. Traditional cooking is done using coal- or wood-fired ovens and cast iron pans; some restaurant chains have adopted these techniques and made this type of food popular in other parts of the country.

Many of the cakes and appetizers of the local cuisine use corn or cassava (known there as mandioca) flour instead of wheat, as the latter did not adapt well to the local weather. The best-known dish from Minas Gerais is "pão de queijo", a small baked roll (known internationally as "Brazilian cheese rolls") made with cheese and cassava flour that can be served hot as an appetizer or for breakfast.

The state is also recognized for its doce de leite, since Minas Gerais is the largest producer of milk in the country. Minas Gerais is also Brazil's most traditional producer of cheese. Minas cheese is renowned nationwide as the distinct Brazilian cheese. Cachaça is also a local produce of high importance, with the state owning hundreds of artisanal factories (in Minas and in the neighboring state of São Paulo, there is the world's largest production of sugar cane, the basis of cachaça production). Typical of the state are Tropeiro beans with torresmo, Tutu de Feijão (Bean's Tutu), chicken with okra stew, galinhada, a rice dish cooked with chicken corn and peas, handmade cheeses, goiabada, paçoca, pamonha, arroz com leite and others. Outside of Minas Gerais it is common to find restaurants specializing in food from the state.

The state cuisine is showcased in various festivals year round and in many locations throughout the state, but the biggest festival is the month-long Comida de Buteco in Belo Horizonte, where 41 bars and restaurants are selected to create a dish using ingredients traditional to local cuisine. People from all over the country and abroad rate the food, the temperature of the beer, the ambiance and service. In 2007, over 400,000 people participated in the festival according to Vox Populi statistics.

== Flag ==
The flag of the state of Minas Gerais is the oldest one adopted in Brazil that was devised by Brazilians. It was remembered by the Republican Party, which opposed the Brazilian Imperial Government, and adopted unofficially as the flag of the state. It has been the official state flag since 1963.

The flag's Latin inscription, "Libertas quæ sera tamen", means "Freedom albeit late", and was the motto of the Minas Gerais Conspiracy, which fought for Minas' independence from Portugal in the 18th century. The phrase was taken from Virgil's Eclogues 1.30. The triangle is said to represent the Holy Trinity. The colors were chosen for their revolutionary meaning: white represents the desire to form a peaceful nation, discarding all colonial institutions, and red the flame of liberty or the blood of the revolutionary martyrs such as Tiradentes.

== Cities ==
In spite of not being the largest state of Brazil and ranking second in population, Minas Gerais has the largest number of cities. Of the more than 5,500 municipalities in the country, Minas has 853 of them, a fact explained by the number of inhabitants and by the vast territory, comparable in area to Madagascar and larger than Metropolitan France. The most notable cities are: the capital Belo Horizonte, Contagem, Betim, Juiz de Fora, Varginha, Muriaé, Montes Claros, Uberlândia, Governador Valadares, Ipatinga, Ouro Preto, Sete Lagoas, Uberaba, Araxá, Patos de Minas, Divinópolis, Barbacena, Itabira, Pouso Alegre, Janaúba, Teófilo Otoni, Conselheiro Lafaiete, Mariana, Poços de Caldas, Tiradentes and São João del-Rei.
