= Cavernas do Peruaçu Environmental Protection Area =

Protected area in Minas Gerais, Brazil

- Área de Proteção Ambiental Cavernas do Peruaçu
- IUCN category V (protected landscape/seascape)
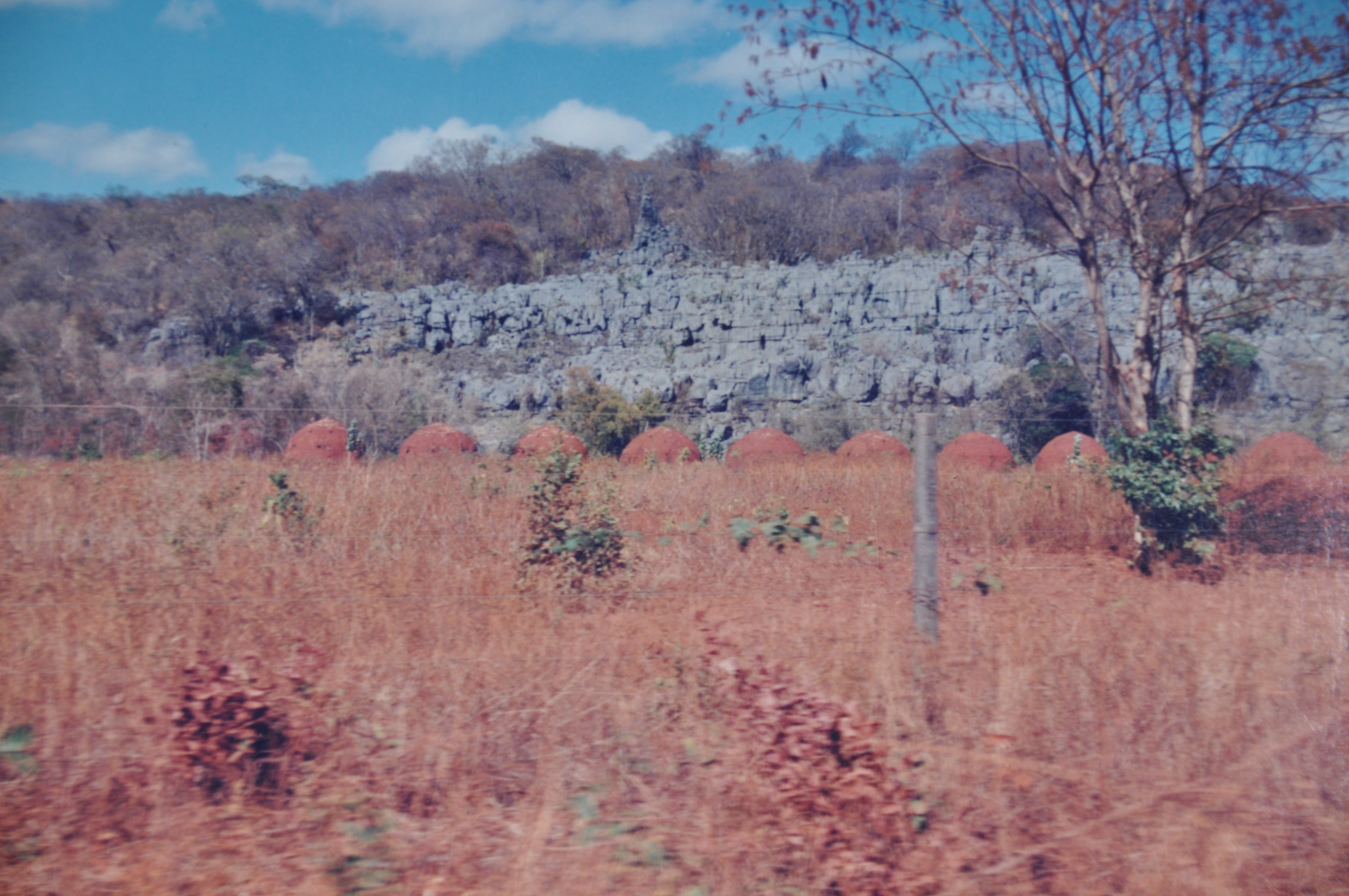
- Cliff wall

- Location within Brazil
- Nearest city: Januária, State of Minas Gerais
- Coordinates: 15.09°S 44.29°W
- Area: 143,354 hectares (354,240 acres)
- Designation: Environmental Protection Area
- Created: 26 September 1989

Cavernas do Peruaçu Environmental Protection Area (Portuguese: Área de Proteção Ambiental Cavernas do Peruaçu) is a protected area in the state of Minas Gerais, Brazil.

== Location ==
The Cavernas do Peruaçu Environmental Protection Area, which covers 143,354 hectares (354,240 acres) of Cerrado biome, was established on 26 September 1989. The area is administered by the Chico Mendes Institute for Biodiversity Conservation. It covers parts of the municipalities of Bonito de Minas, Cônego Marinho, Itacarambi and Januária in the state of Minas Gerais.

== Environment ==
The Peruaçu River is a tributary of the São Francisco River, flowing from the tropical Cerrado region towards the semi-arid Caatinga of north east Brazil. It runs through a deep canyon cut through a limestone massif, with many galleries and caves in the high cliffs on either side. The Olhos d'Agua cave is 6 kilometres (3.7 mi) long, and the Janelso cave is 3,020 by 400 metres (9,910 by 1,310 ft) and 200 metres (660 ft) high. The caves contain stalactites, one of which is 28 metres (92 ft) high. Rock paintings have been found throughout the area. The river course holds gallery forests, while the massif holds some of the last areas of "dry forest" left in central Brazil. On 16 September 1998 the area was added to the UNESCO World Heritage Site Tentative List.

== Conservation ==
The area is classed as IUCN protected area category V, protected landscape/seascape. The purpose is to conserve the landscape and regional culture, protect and preserve the caves and other karst formations, protect the vegetation and wildlife, manage human impact and ensure the sustainable use of natural resources. Protected species include maned wolf (Chrysocyon brachyurus), ocelot (Leopardus pardalis mitis) jaguar (Panthera onca) and cougar (Puma concolor capricornensis).

== Sources ==
- Área de Proteção Ambiental Cavernas do Peruaçu (in Portuguese), Chico Mendes Institute for Biodiversity Conservation
- Cavernas do Peruaçu Federal Environmental Protection Area (APA) / Veredas Do Peruaçu State Park, UNESCO
- Unidade de Conservação: Área de Proteção Ambiental Cavernas do Peruaçu (in Portuguese), MMA: Ministério do Meio Ambiente
