= Mineiro =

Brazilian Portuguese dialect of Minas Gerais

Mineiro dialect
- Mineiro; Mineirês
- Native to: Brazil
- Region: Minas Gerais
- Language family: Indo-European: Italic; Latin; Romance; Western Romance; Ibero-Romance; West-Iberian; Galician-Portuguese; Portuguese; Brazilian Portuguese; Mineiro dialect

Language codes
- ISO 639-3: –
- IETF: pt-u-sd-brmg
- Minas Gerais

Mineiro (Portuguese pronunciation: [miˈnejɾu]), (Note: feminine: Mineira [miˈnejɾɐ]) Mineirês, or the Brazilian mountain dialect (Portuguese: montanhês) is the Brazilian Portuguese term for the dialect spoken in the center, East and Southeast regions of the state of Minas Gerais.

== Etymology ==
The term is also the demonym of Minas Gerais.

== Demography ==
It is notable for being spoken in its capital, Belo Horizonte, and its historical cities: Ouro Preto (capital from 1720 until 1897), Mariana (first major town in Minas Gerais, founded in 1696), Santa Bárbara, Sabará, Diamantina, Tiradentes, São João del-Rei, Congonhas, Serro, Caeté, Itabira etc.

Ten million people, about half of the state's population, speak it.

=== Linguistic geography ===
The dialect is mainly spoken in four geographic regions of the state. The four regions have a great population density.

- Intermediate Geographic Region of Belo Horizonte (center)
- Intermediate Geographic Region of Ipatinga (east)
- Intermediate Geographic Region of Juiz de Fora (southeast)
- Intermediate Geographic Region of Barbacena (south-center)

==== Most populous cities which speak Mineiro (population>50 000) ====
- Greater than 700 000: Belo Horizonte (2 530 701).
- Between 600 000 and 700 000: Contagem.
- Between 500 000 and 600 000: Juiz de Fora.
- Between 400 000 and 500 000: Betim.
- Between 300 000 and 400 000: Ribeirão das Neves.
- Between 250 000 and 300 000: Governador Valadares, Ipatinga.
- Between 200 000 and 250 000: Sete Lagoas, Santa Luzia.
- Between 150 000 and 200 000: Ibirité.
- Between 100 000 and 150 000: Barbacena, Sabará, Vespasiano, Conselheiro Lafaiete, Itabira, Ubá, Coronel Fabriciano, Muriaé.
- Between 75 000 and 100 000: Nova Lima, Caratinga, Manhuaçu, Timóteo, São João del-Rei, Curvelo, João Monlevade, Viçosa, Cataguases,
- Between 50 000 and 75 000: Ouro Preto, Esmeraldas, Lagoa Santa, Pedro Leopoldo, Mariana, Ponte Nova, Congonhas, Leopoldina, Itabirito.

=== Linguistic geography of other accents in Minas Gerais ===
==== Caipira dialect ====
The caipira dialect is spoken in the following regions of the state:

- Intermediate Geographic Region of Divinópolis (mostly; minor: mineiro dialect)
- Intermediate Geographic Region of Patos de Minas (mostly; minor: geraizeiro dialect)
- Intermediate Geographic Region of Uberlândia
- Intermediate Geographic Region of Uberaba
- Intermediate Geographic Region of Varginha
- Intermediate Geographic Region of Pouso Alegre

Cities where caipira is spoken are: Uberlândia, Uberaba, Araguari, Ituiutaba, Delta, Frutal, Iturama, Divinópolis, Nova Serrana, Itaúna, Pará de Minas, Luz, Bom Despacho, Abaeté, Bambuí, Formiga, Patos de Minas, Araxá, Patrocínio, Sacramento, São Gotardo, Poços de Caldas, Pouso Alegre, Varginha, Passos, Lavras, Campo Belo, Arcos, Três Pontas, Boa Esperança, Capitólio, Campanha, Elói Mendes, Alfenas, Três Corações, Itajubá, São Lourenço, Caxambu, Muzambinho, Extrema, Camanducaia.

==== Geraizeiro dialect ====
The geraizeiro dialect is spoken in the following regions of the state:

- Intermediate Geographic Region of Montes Claros
- Intermediate Geographic Region of Teófilo Otoni (mostly; minor: mineiro dialect)
- Intermediate Geographic Region of Governador Valadares (mostly; minor: mineiro dialect)

Cities where geraizeiro is spoken are: Montes Claros, Governador Valadares, Teófilo Otoni, Paracatu, Unaí, João Pinheiro, Pirapora, Buritizeiro, São Francisco, Januária, Janaúba, Bocaiúva, Várzea da Palma, Espinosa, Salinas, Nanuque, Almenara, Capelinha, Araçuaí, Jequitinhonha, Grão Mogol, Medina, Águas Vermelhas, Itacambira, Itamarandiba, Matias Cardoso, Manga, Malacacheta, Água Boa, Jacinto.

== History ==
Minas Gerais was settled during the late 17th and early 18th centuries by a mix of recent Portuguese immigrants (reinóis or emboabas), mainly from Minho, and earlier colonists that came from São Paulo (paulistas). There was an intense rivalry between the two groups, fighting over the gold mines (from which the name of the province was taken, Minas Gerais means "General Mines"). These conflicts required the intervention of the Portuguese Crown after a serious uprisal developed into civil war (Guerra dos Emboabas) with the final defeat of the paulistas in 1708.

In the 19th century, the state was being forgotten due to the decline of gold mining. Due to this isolation, the state was influenced by the dialect of Rio de Janeiro in the southeast, while the south and the Triangulo Mineiro region, began to speak the rustic dialect of São Paulo (caipira). The central region of Minas Gerais, however, developed their own dialect, which is known as Mineiro or mountain dialect. This dialect is also present in cities of the center and southeast of the state, which is surrounded by mountains and mines.

Recently, the influence of mineiro has been increasing and spreading, due to local pride and rejection of other accents.

=== History of linguistic study ===
The first scientific study of the dialect was the Esboço de um Atlas Linguístico de Minas Gerais (EALMG), "Draft of a Linguistic Atlas for Minas Gerais". The work was done in 1977 by the Federal University of Juiz de Fora. Until today, it is the most important linguistic study about the state.

== Dialect characteristics ==
- Reduction (and often loss) of final and initial unstressed vowels, especially with e, i and u: parte ([ˈpaɾt^{(ʃ)}i]) ("part") becomes *partch [ˈpahtᶴ] (with soft affricate T). Common to most of Brazil.
- Omission of reflexive pronouns ("Eu me machuquei") becomes ("Eu machuquei").
- Assimilation of consecutive vowels: o urubu [u uˈɾubu] ("the vulture") becomes *u rubu [u‿ˈɾubu].
- Debuccalization (and usual loss) of final /r/ and /s/: cantar [kɐ̃ˈtah] ("to sing") becomes *cantá [kɐ̃ˈta] and os livros ("the books") [uz ˈlivɾus] becomes *us lívru [uz‿ˈlivɾu]. Common to most of Brazil.
- Soft pronunciation of "r": rato [ˈʁatu] ("mouse") is pronounced [ˈhatu]. Very common in other parts of Brazil.
- Loss of the plural ending -s in adjectives and nouns, retained only in articles and verbs: meus filhos [mews ˈfiʎus] ("my children") becomes (sometimes; most of the time in the capital, Belo Horizonte) *meus filho [mewsˈfiʎu], (most of the time) *meus fii [mews‿ˈfi] OR *meus fiu [mews‿ˈfiu] (see below).
- Realization of most /ʎ/ as [j]: alho [ˈaʎu] ("garlic") becomes homophonous with aio [ˈaju] ("hired tutor"); see yeísmo in Spanish. Probably the most characteristic feature of the Mineiro accent, though it is less present in Belo Horizonte.
- Replacement of some diphthongs with long vowels: fio [fiw] (thread) becomes fii [fi], pouco [ˈpowku] (few) becomes poco [ˈpoku].
- Apocope of final syllables. -lho [-ʎu] becomes [-ij] (filho → *fii'), -inho becomes *-im' [-ĩ] (pinho → *pim').
- Diphthongization of stressed vowels: mas [mas] ("but") becomes *mais [majs] and três [tɾes] ("three") becomes *treis [tɾejs] Common in other parts of Brazil, particularly Rio de Janeiro.
- Intense elision: abra as asas [ˈabɾɐ as ˈazɐs] ("spread your wings") becomes *abrazaza [abɾɐˈzazɐ]. Para onde nós estamos indo? [ˈpaɾɐ ˈõdʒi nos esˈtɐmus ˈĩdu] ("Where are we going?") becomes Pronoistamuíno? [pɾõnɔstɐmuˈinu]. However, see : this is far from being the most common usage.
- Loss of initial "e" in words beginning with "es": esporte becomes [ˈspɔhtᶴ].
- Mineiro also lacks notable features of other accents, including the retroflex R (caipira), palatalization of S (carioca), strong dental R (gaucho), or "singsong" nordestino intonation.

This dialect is often hard to understand for people outside the region where it is spoken due to heavy assimilation and elision.

== See also ==
- Brazilian Portuguese
- Portuguese dialects
- Portuguese phonology
- Caipira dialect
