= Cônego Marinho =

Municipality in Minas Gerais, Brazil

Coordinates: 15°17′43″S 44°24′45″W

- Municipality
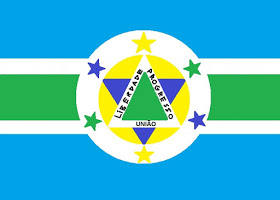
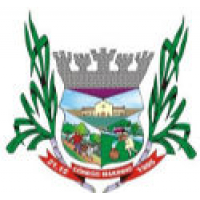
- Flag Coat of arms
- Interactive map of Cônego Marinho
- Country: Brazil
- State: Minas Gerais
- Region: Southeast
- Time zone: UTC−3 (BRT)

Location of Cônego Marinho in the state of Minas Gerais

Cônego Marinho is a municipality in the north of the state of Minas Gerais in Brazil. As of 2020 the population was 7,686 in an area of 1,618 km^{2} (625 sq mi).

- The elevation of the municipal seat is 637 meters.
- It became a municipality in 1997.
- The postal code (CEP) is 39489–000.

Neighboring municipalities are: Montalvânia, Bonito de Minas, Januária, Itacarambi, São João das Missões, and Miravânia. The national park of Caverna do Peruaçu lies to the north. It was created in 2004 and has an area of 56,649.00 ha. It is important for its rock formations, the canyon cut out by the Peruaçu river and its many caverns. See Itacarambi for more information in Portuguese.

The economy is based on agriculture with emphasis on cattle raising. There were 8,500 head in 2006. The main agricultural crops were corn, manioc, sugarcane, rice, and coffee. The GDP was R$18,750,000 in 2005.

== Municipal Human Development Index ==
- MHDI: .639 (2000)
- State ranking: 771 out of 853 municipalities as of 2000
- National ranking: 3,955 out of 5,138 municipalities as of 2000

(For the complete list see Frigoletto)

== See also ==
- List of municipalities in Minas Gerais
