= Cavernas do Peruaçu National Park =

National park in Minas Gerais, Brazil

- Parque Nacional Cavernas do Peruaçu
- IUCN category II (national park)
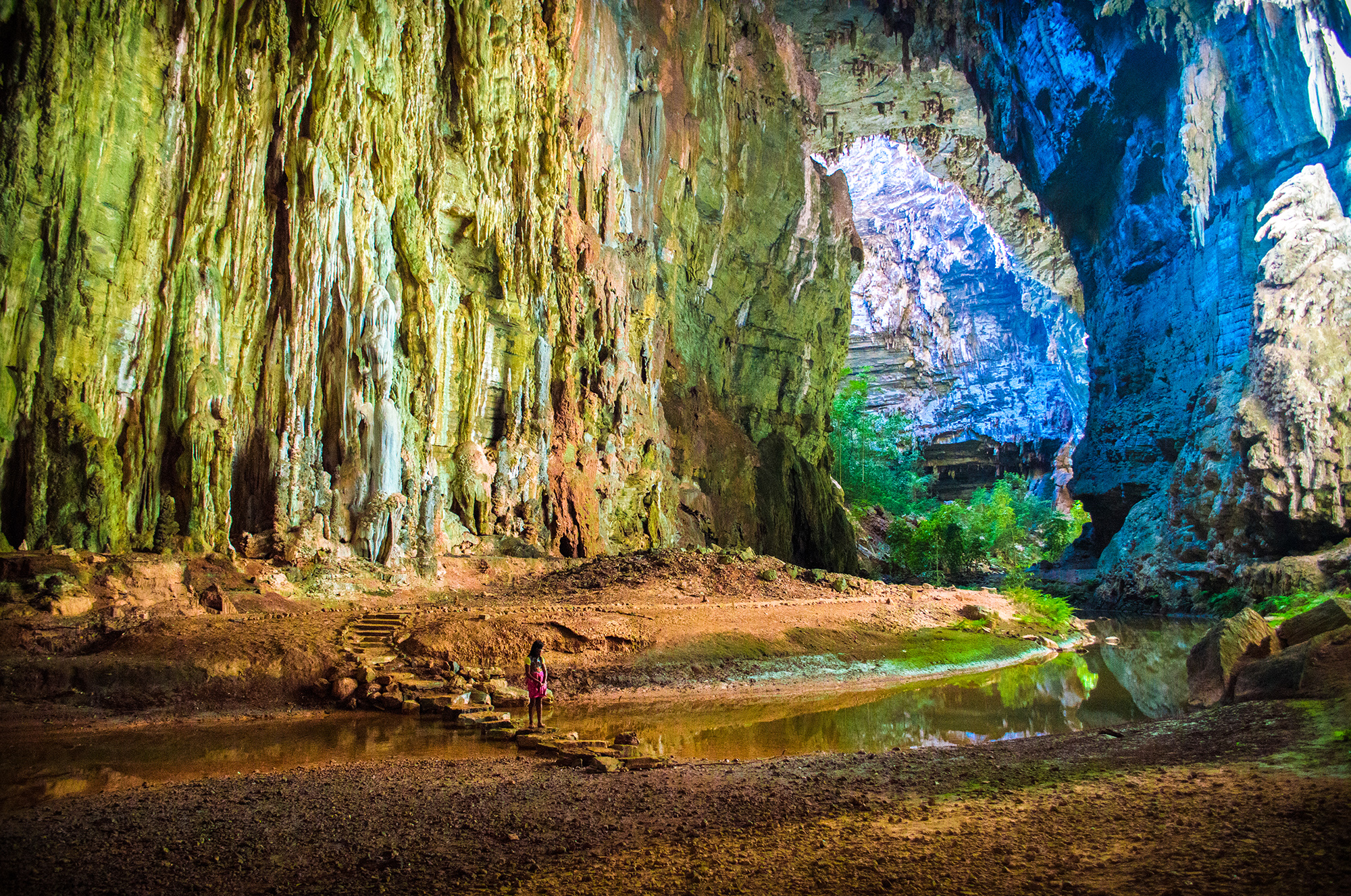
- Xakriabá Indian child in the interior of the Janelão cave

- Location within Brazil
- Nearest city: Januária, Minas Gerais
- Coordinates: 15.122°S 44.324°W
- Designation: National park
- Administrator: ICMBio

UNESCO World Heritage Site
- Type: Natural
- Criteria: vii, viii
- Designated: 2025 (47th session)
- Reference no.: 1747
- Region: The Americas

Cavernas do Peruaçu National Park (Portuguese: Parque Nacional Cavernas do Peruaçu) is a national park in the state of Minas Gerais, Brazil. It is noted for its large limestone caves.

== Location ==
The Cavernas do Peruaçu National Park, with an area of 56,448 hectares (139,490 acres), was created on 21 September 1999 and is administered by the Chico Mendes Institute for Biodiversity Conservation. The park covers parts of the municipalities of Januária, Itacarambi and São João das Missões in the north of the state of Minas Gerais. Nearby are the Veredas do Peruaçu State Park, operated by the State Forestry Institute, and the Xakriabá Indian Reserve.

The Peruaçu River crosses the park from north west to south east, entering the São Francisco River, which runs along the south east boundary of the park. The Cavernas do Peruaçu Environmental Protection Area (EPA), with an area of 143,866 hectares (355,500 acres), was created on 26 September 1989. The EPA, which covers the Peruaçu River basin, overlaps both the National Park and the State Park, but both parks extend outside the boundary of the EPA.

Temperatures average about 18 °C (64 °F) and are slightly higher in winter due to greater cloud cover in summer. Average annual rainfall is under 1,200 millimetres (47 in), mostly falling in the summer. Relative humidity is around 70%. The park lies between the Cerrado and Caatinga regions and contains seasonal montane deciduous forest, semi-deciduous forest, savannah with trees, and transitional zones. The diverse environments support a wide range of fauna. The Gruta do Janelão and other caves have rock art more than 10,000 years old.

== Conservation ==
The park is a fully protected unit as defined by Law Law 9.985 / 2000, which established the National System of Conservation Units (SNUG). The purpose is to preserve the geological and archaeological heritage, representative samples of cerrado, seasonal forest and other forms of natural vegetation, fauna, landscapes, water resources and other natural attributes of the region. Infrastructure work, expected to be complete in July 2014, created six routes for visitors with eight caves open to the public. It is hoped that the park will attract tourists to the north of Minas Gerais.

In 2013 WWF Brazil was working with the Instituto Biotrópicos to monitor mammals of the Cerrado in the park. Protected species include maned wolf (Chrysocyon brachyurus), cougar (Puma concolor), jaguar (Panthera onca), ocelot (Leopardus pardalis), colocolo (Leopardus colocolo), chestnut-bellied guan (Penelope ochrogaster), Minas Gerais tyrannulet (Phylloscartes roquettei) and the fish Trichomycterus itacarambiensis.

The park was created recently and land ownership issues have not all been settled. There are many small farms, estates and indigenous land around the park, on all of which fire is used routinely in agriculture. Hunters enter the park and leave fires burning, so there is a risk of fire within the park.

In 2025, the park was designated as a World Heritage Site by UNESCO.

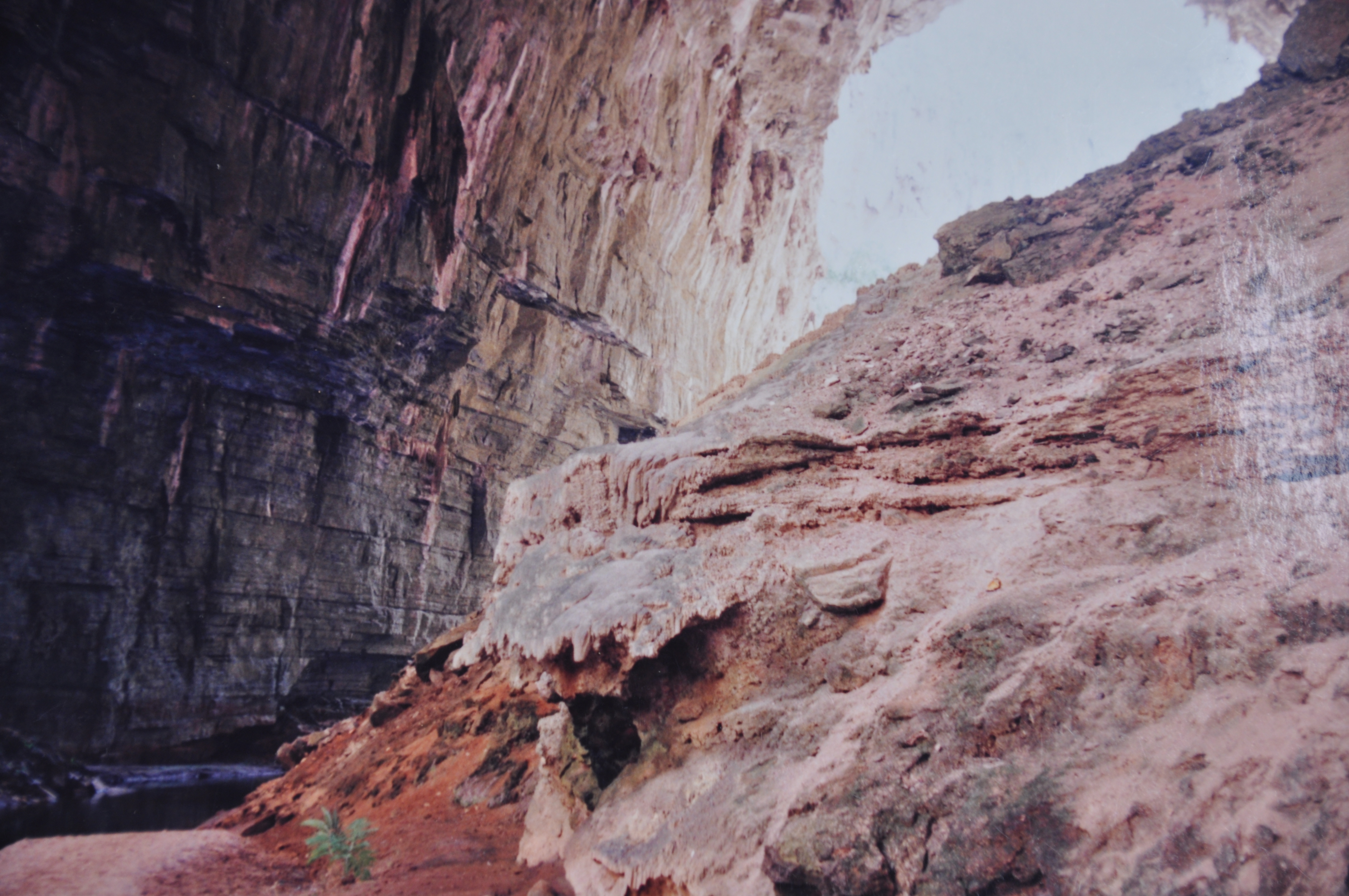
Cave entrance

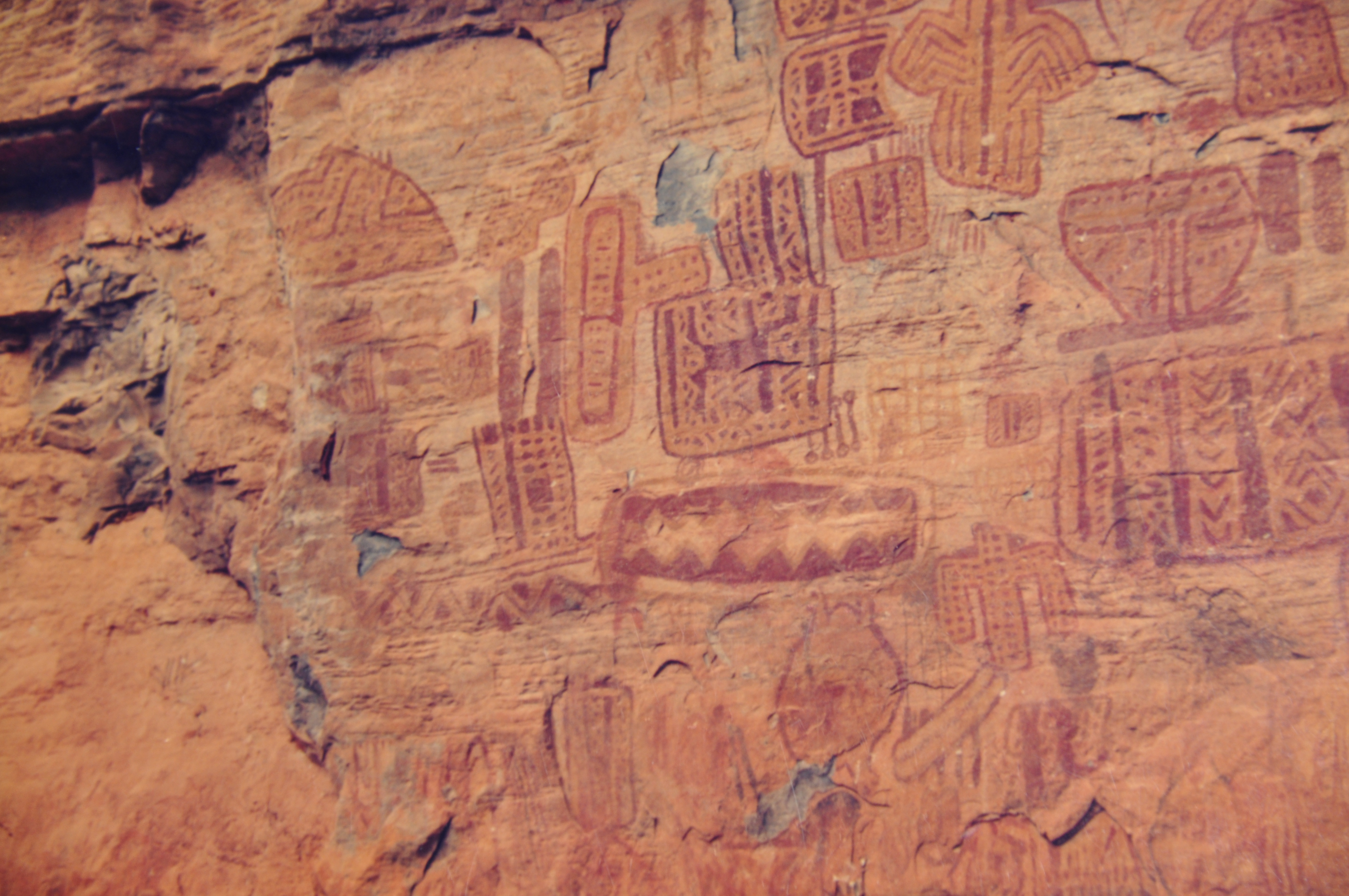
Rock painting in Janelão cave

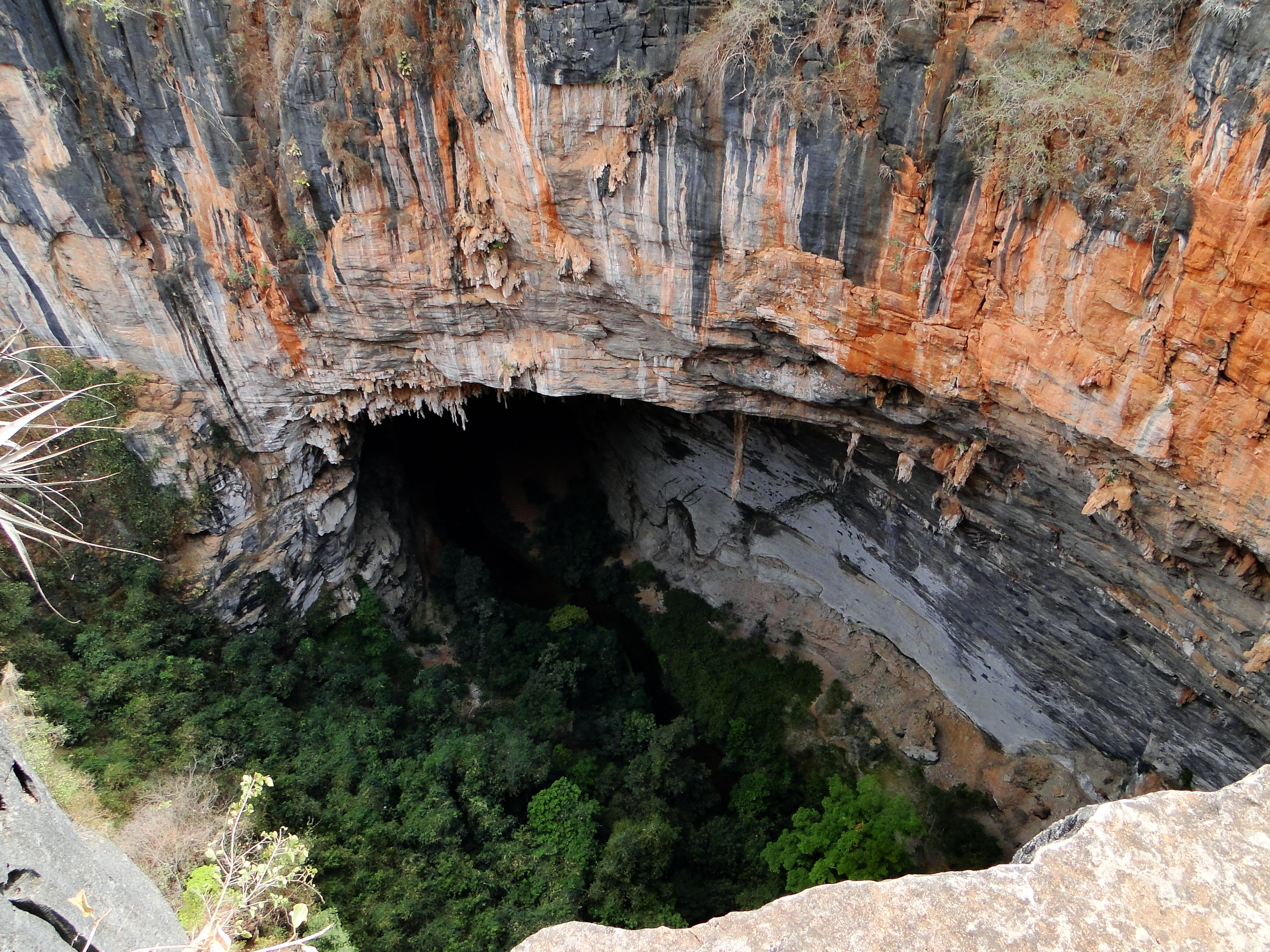
Dolina dos Macacos sinkhole

== Sources ==
- "Mapa com os limites [.kml]", Área de Proteção Ambiental Cavernas do Peruaçu (in Portuguese), ICMBio, archived from the original on 2019-07-22 [This is a .kml file, which defines the location and outline of the APA. It may be viewed using Google My Maps - Create a New Map - Import.]
- Bruno Moraes (2 December 2013), Parque Nacional Cavernas do Peruaçu recebe infraestrutura para o turismo (in Portuguese), WWF Brazil
- Flávio Túlio Gomes (March 2007), Plano Operativo de Prevenção e Combate aos Incêndios Florestais no Parque Nacional Cavernas do Peruaçu (in Portuguese), MMA: Ministério do Meio Ambiente, archived from the original on 2016-06-01
- Parque Nacional Cavernas do Peruaçu (in Portuguese), Chico Mendes Institute for Biodiversity Conservation, archived from the original on August 18, 2013
