= Bonito de Minas =

- Flag Coat of arms
- Motto: Portuguese: Coragem pra fazer Bonito (Courage to make Bonito)
- Location in Minas Gerais

- Location in Brazil
- Coordinates: 15°19′22″S 44°45′14″W
- Country: Brazil
- Region: Southeast
- State: Minas Gerais
- Mesoregion: North of Minas Gerais
- Microregion: Januária
- Incorporated (municipality): December 21, 1995

Government
  - Mayor: José Reis Nogueira de Barros

Area
  - Total: 3,904.911 km^{2} (1,507.695 sq mi)
- Elevation: 600 m (2,000 ft)

Population (2020)
  - Total: 11,369
  - Density: 2.48/km^{2} (6.4/sq mi)
- Demonym: Bonitense
- Time zone: UTC−3 (BRT)
- CEP postal code: 39490-000
- Area code: 38
- HDI (2010): 0,583
- Website: Official website

Bonito de Minas is a municipality in the northeast of the Brazilian state of Minas Gerais. As of 2020 the population was 11,369 in a total area of 3,901 km^{2}. The elevation is 629 meters. It became a municipality in 1995.

Bonito de Minas is part of the statistical microregion of Januária. It is surrounded by the following municipalities: Januária, Montalvânia, Cônego Marinho, and the state of Bahia. It is connected by poor roads to the regional center of Januária to the south. The distance is 48 kilometers. The Serra dos Tropeiros and the boundary with the state of Bahia are to the north.

This is one of the poorest municipalities in the state and in the country. The main economic activities are cattle raising and farming with modest production of rice, beans, corn, and lemons. In 2006 there were 695 rural producers with a total area of 63,936 hectares. Cropland made up 4,800 hectares. There were only 36 tractors. In the urban area there were no financial institutions as of 2006. There were 13 automobiles, giving a ratio of about one automobile for every 676 inhabitants, one of the worst in the country. Health care was provided by 1 public health clinic. There were no hospitals.

Municipal Human Development Index

- MHDI: .580 (2000)
- State ranking: 849 out of 853 municipalities as of 2000
- National ranking: 4,979 out of 5,138 municipalities as of 2000
- Life expectancy: 64
- Literacy rate: 62
- Combined primary, secondary and tertiary gross enrolment ratio: .744
- Per capita income (monthly): R$49.12 (For the complete list see Frigoletto)

== See also ==
- List of municipalities in Minas Gerais
