= Geraizeiros =

Geraizeiro people
Povo Geraizeiro
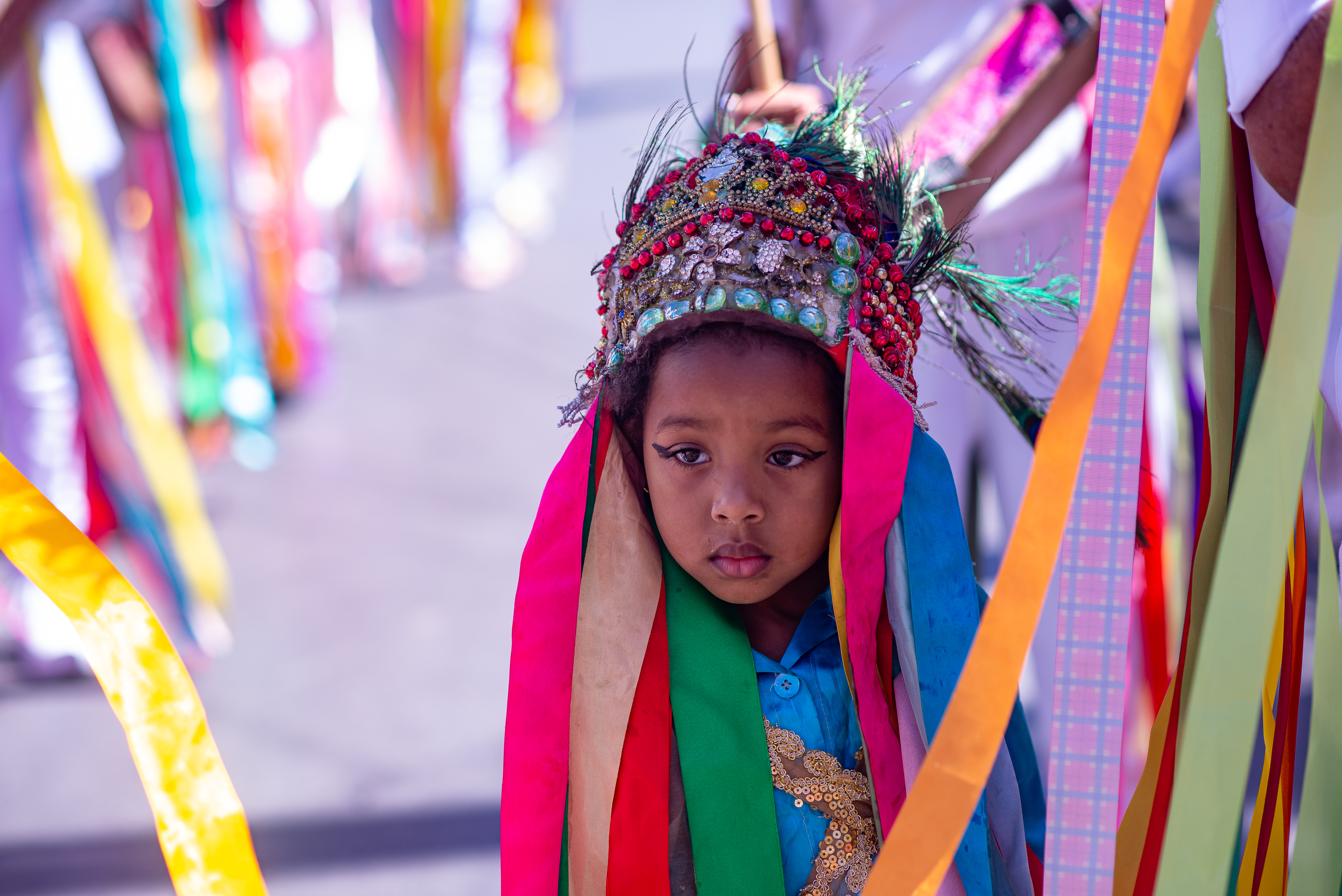
- Geraizeira girl in traditional festive catopes clothing, Montes Claros, Minas Gerais

Total population
- c. 1.8-2.3 million (2022)

Regions with significant populations
- Brazil

Languages
- Portuguese

Religion
- Predominantly Roman Catholic

Related ethnic groups
- Sertanejos, Caipiras, Mineiros, Jê Amerindians, Portuguese, Yorubas, Kongo

The Geraizeiro (Natively: [ʒɛɾɐjˈzeɾu]) people are a Brazilian ethnocultural group and the traditional inhabitants of the cerrados regions of northern Minas Gerais state, in the Southeast region of Brazil.

== Etymology ==
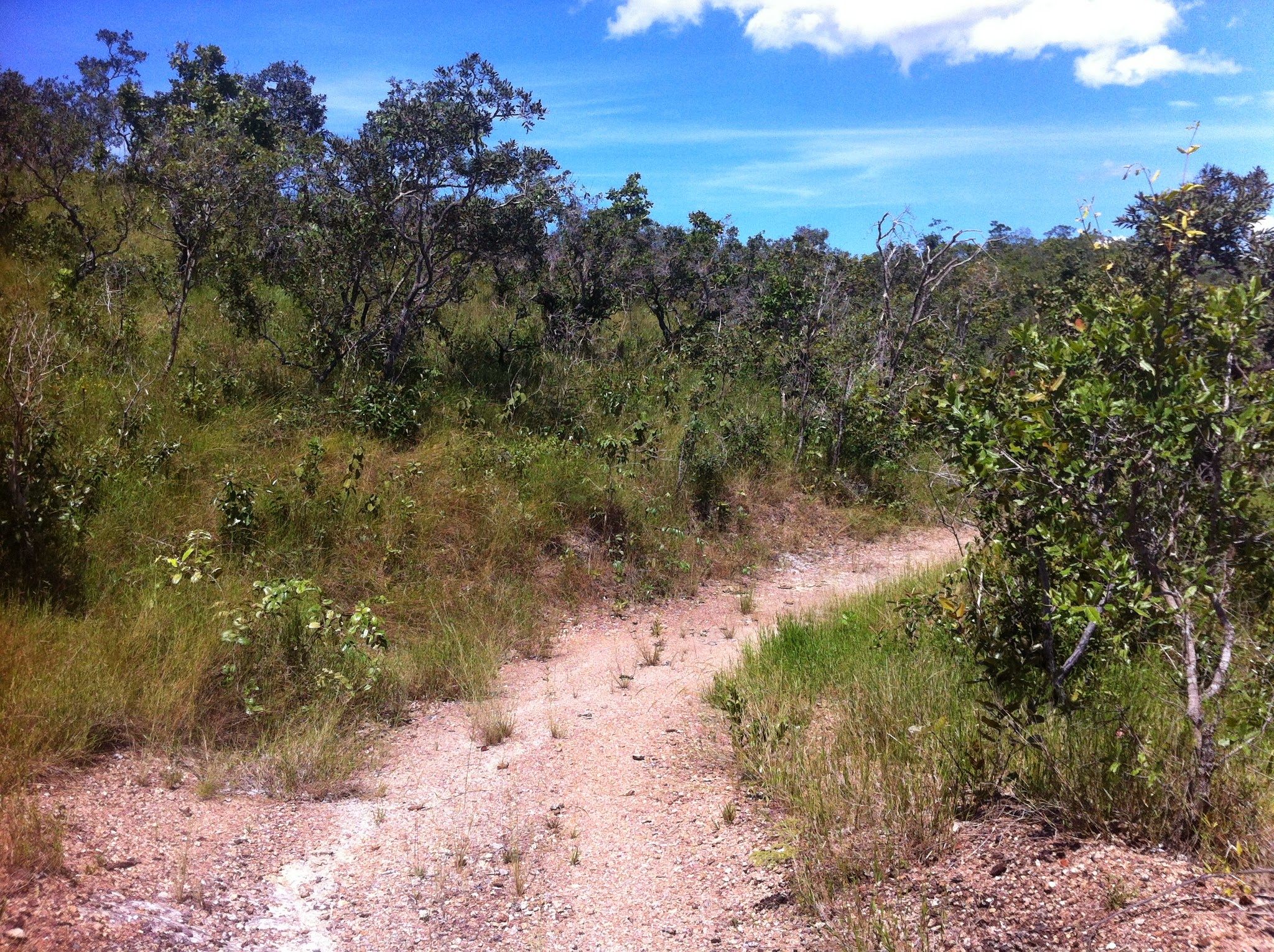
Cerrado in the state of Goiás.

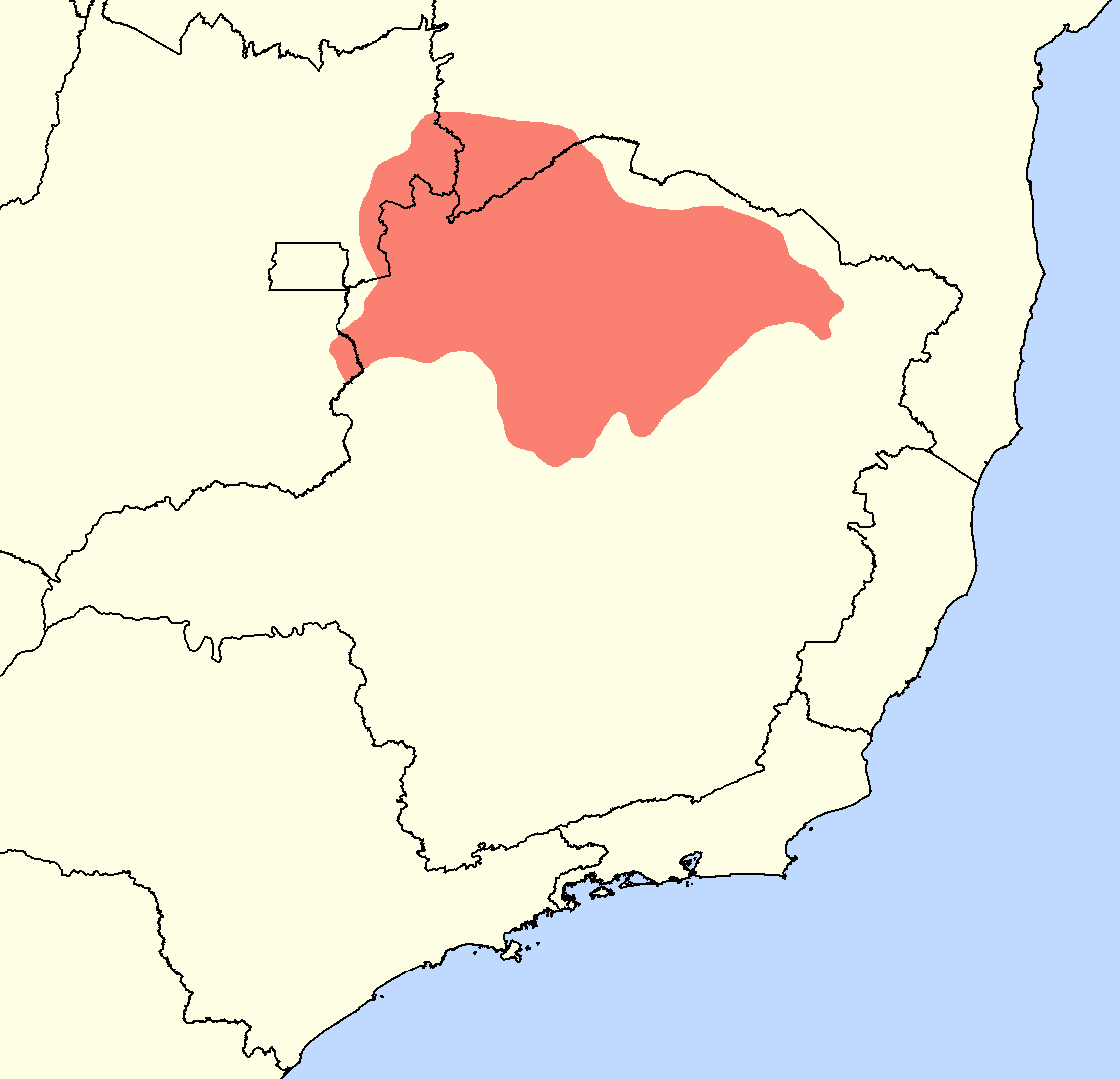
Area inhabited by the Gerazeiro people (red) over a map of southeastern Brazil.

This term derives from the fact that in the north of this state and in the cerrado regions they are known as Gerais, a contraction of Matos Gerais (general bushes). The first name of Minas Gerais was Capitania das Minas dos Matos Gerais, that is, Captaincy of the Mines in the General Bushes. "Mines" here refers to the mining of gold and diamond; "general bushes" refers to cerrado and, near the border with Bahia, caatinga. Geraizeiro can also be called catrumano, baianeiro, abaianado. Geraizeiro is also the name of the Brazilian Portuguese accent in the north of Minas Gerais. The central and east regions of the state speak mineiro. South and west Minas Gerais speak caipira.

== Recognition ==
In 2007, the traditional peoples, among them the geraizeiro, were recognized by the Government of Brazil, which through the National Policy for the Sustainable Development of these Communities (PNPCT), expanded the recognition partially made in the 1988 Constitution, adding to the indigenous, quilombolas and other traditional peoples.

== Commemoration ==
Since 2011, it is celebrated annually on December 8 (day of the Catholic liturgical feast Immaculate Conception of Our Lady) the Day of the Gerais, with celebration in the municipality of Matias Cardoso, founded by the bandeirantes of São Paulo Januário Almeida and his son, Matias Cardoso de Almeida. The date was the initiative of state representative Paulo Guedes (not the minister). The date was chosen because it is the day of the patron saint of the municipal parish church, built in 1664.
