= Miravânia =

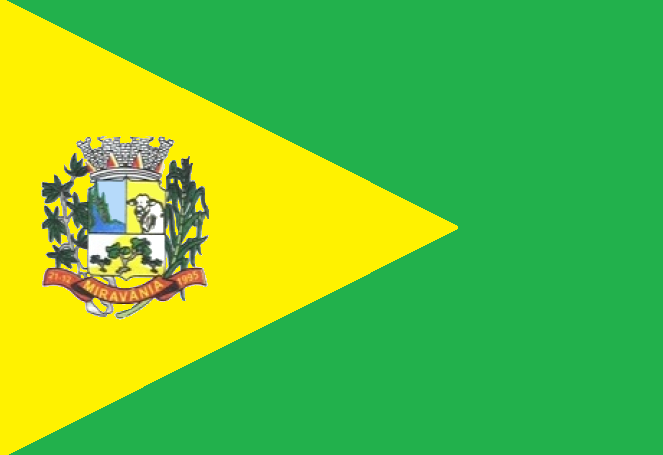
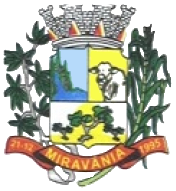
- Flag Coat of arms

- Location in the state of Minas Gerais

- Location in Brazil
- Coordinates: 14°44′58″S 44°23′56″W
- Country: Brazil
- State: Minas Gerais
- Mesoregion: North of Minas Gerais
- Microregion: Januária
- Incorporated (municipality): 21 December 1995

Government
  - Mayor: Elzio Mota Dourado

Area
  - Total: 603.005 km^{2} (232.822 sq mi)
- Elevation: 640 m (2,100 ft)

Population (2020)
  - Total: 4,914
  - Density: 8.149/km^{2} (21.11/sq mi)
- Demonym: Miravaniense
- Time zone: UTC−3 (BRT)
- CEP postal code: 39465-000
- Website: miravania.mg.gov.br

Miravânia is a municipality in the north of the state of Minas Gerais in Brazil. As of 2020 the population was 4,914 in an area of 603 km^{2} (233 sq mi). It is located on the left bank of the São Francisco River. It is connected by dirt road to São João das Missões by paved BR-135. The distance is 112 km. Neighboring municipalities are: Montalvânia, Manga, Cônego Marinho, and São João das Missões.

The economy is based on agriculture with emphasis on cattle raising. There were 10,000 head in 2006. The main agricultural crops were bananas, rice, corn, and manioc. The GDP was R$12,247,000 in 2005.

This municipality is extremely isolated from major population centers and suffers from drought and poor soils. It is one of the poorest in the state and in the country. Like many impoverished districts it fought for municipal autonomy to apply for government assistance programs.

- Municipal Human Development Index: .644 (2000)
- State ranking: 761 out of 853 municipalities as of 2000
- National ranking: 3,857 out of 5,138 municipalities as of 2000

(For the complete list see Frigoletto)

- Infant mortality rate: 46.15 (2003) The rate for Minas Gerais was 17.40; the rate for Brazil was 18.91.
- Illiteracy rate: 31% (15 years old or older)(2003) The rate for Minas Gerais was 11.96; the rate for Brazil was 13.63
- Health clinics: 2

== See also ==
- IBGE
- Data on Health and Education
- List of municipalities in Minas Gerais
