= Chapada Gaúcha =

Municipality in Minas Gerais, Brazil

Coordinates: 15°17′45″S 45°36′27″W

- Municipality
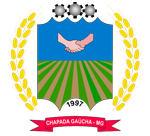
- Flag Coat of arms
- Interactive map of Chapada Gaúcha
- Country: Brazil
- State: Minas Gerais
- Region: Southeast
- Time zone: UTC−3 (BRT)

Location of Chapada Gaúcha in the state of Minas Gerais

Chapada Gaúcha is a municipality in the northern region of Minas Gerais, Brazil. The population in 2020 was 13,953 in an area of 3,215 km^{2}. The elevation of the municipal seat is 872 meters. It became a municipality in 1997. The postal code (CEP) is 39314-000.

== Geography ==
Chapada Gaúcha is part of the statistical microregion of Januária. It is connected by poor roads to Arinos and to Januária. It lies in an extensive agricultural area on highlands south of the boundary with the state of Bahia. The Grande Sertão Veredas National Park lies a few kilometers from the municipal seat. See Braziltour for information about the park. The park is not open to visitors and has no facilities. It was created in 1989 and has an area of 231,668.00 hectares.

=== Distances ===
- Arinos: 93 km (58 mi) (dirt road)
- São Francisco: 134 km (83 mi) (dirt road)
- Januária: 163 km (101 mi) (dirt road)
- Brasília: 372 km (231 mi)
- Belo Horizonte: 580 km (360 mi)

=== Climate ===
The climate is semi-humid. The dry season is well-defined, and occurs between the months of May and November. The rainy season takes place from November through April. The average annual temperature is around 21 °C – with an average annual high of 30 °C, and a low of 18 °C. June is normally the coldest month of the year.

== Economy ==
The main economic activities are cattle raising (65,000 head in 2006) and farming with large production of soybeans (9,000 ha.), corn, and rice. In the urban area there were no financial institutions as of 2006. There were 134 automobiles, giving a ratio of about one automobile for every 80 inhabitants. The Gross Domestic Product was R$36,891,000.00 (2005) a year, which was mainly generated by services and agriculture. Health care was provided by 7 public health clinics. There were no hospitals as of 2005.

Farm Data for 2006

- Producers: 749
- Area: 140,806 ha.
- Area planted in crops: 88,000 ha.
- Area of natural pasture: 45,000 ha.
- Area of woodland and forest: 265,000 ha.
- Persons occupied related to the producer: 2,803
- Salaried workers not related to the producer: 198
- Establishments with tractors: 86
- Number of tractors: 189

Municipal Human Development Index

Chapada Gaúcha was in the bottom tier of the poorest municipalities in Minas Gerais

- MHDI: .683 (2000)
- State ranking: 623 out of 853 municipalities as of 2000
- National ranking: 3,264 out of 5,138 municipalities as of 2000

== See also ==
- List of municipalities in Minas Gerais
