= Célia Xakriabá =

Brazilian indigenous educator and activist (born 1990)

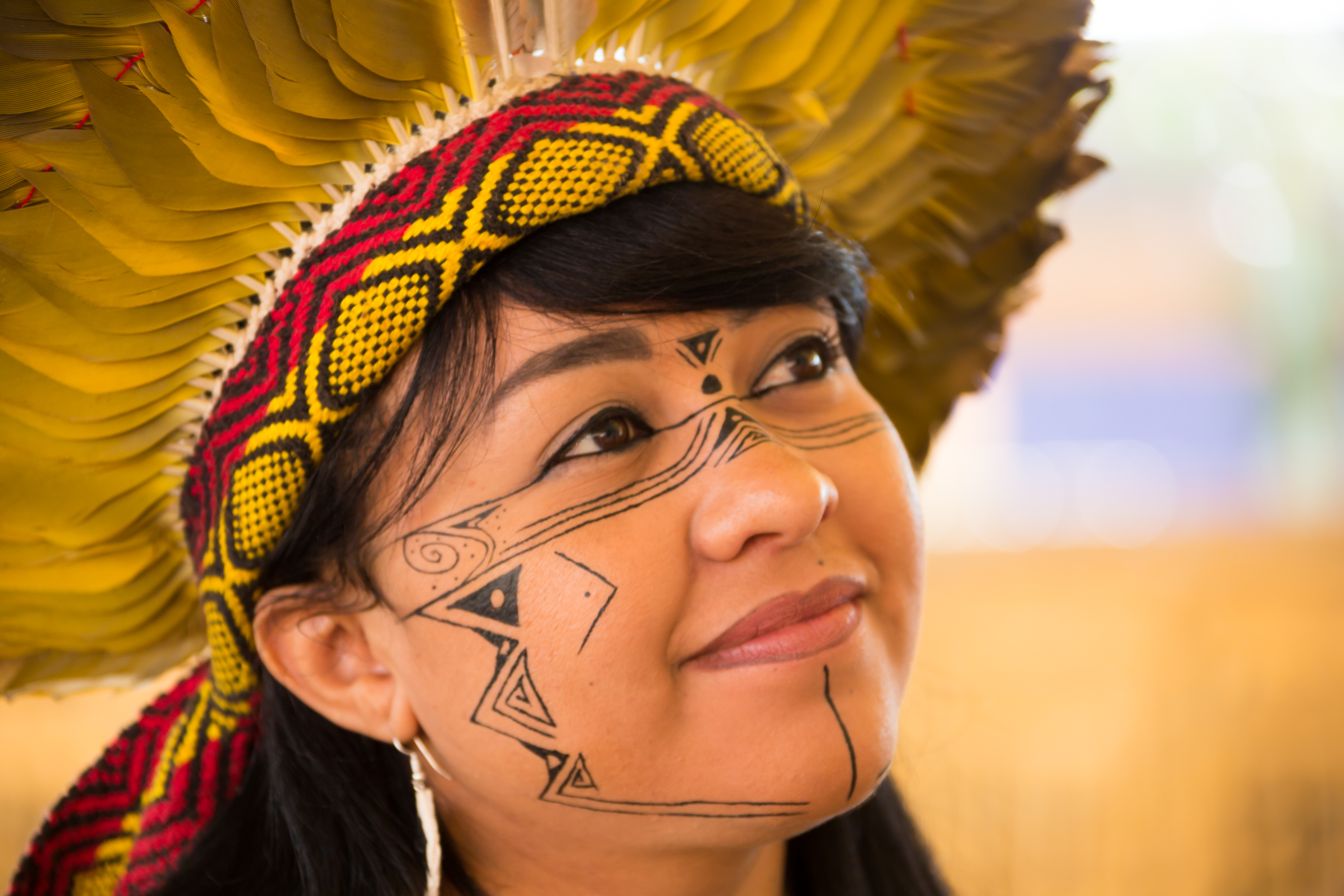
- Xakriabá in 2018

Member of the Chamber of Deputies from Minas Gerais
- Incumbent
- Assumed office 1 February 2023
- Constituency: At-large

Personal details
- Born: Célia Nunes Correa; 9 May 1990 (age 36) Itacarambi, (Note: At the time, Itacarambi was a district of the municipality of São João das Missões.) Minas Gerais, Brazil
- Party: PSOL (2022–present)
- Education: Federal University of Minas Gerais (BA); University of Brasília (MSc)
- Occupation: Educator, activist

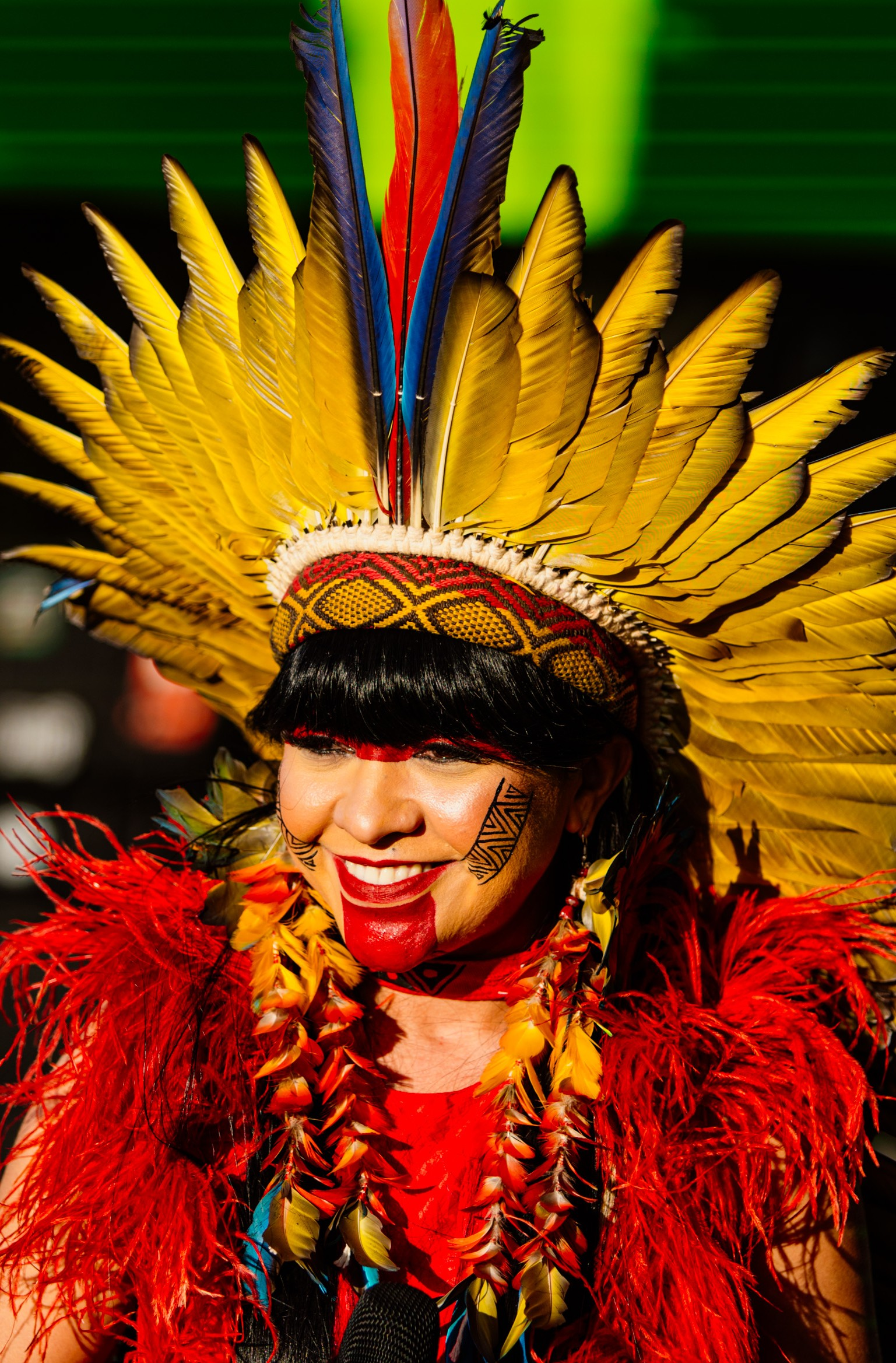
Célia in 2022

Célia Nunes Correa (born 9 May 1990), better known as Célia Xakriabá [ˈsɛli.ɐ ʃɐˌkɾi.ɐˈba], is an indigenous educator and activist of the Xakriabá people of Brazil. She is best known for holding debates and lectures at universities in Brazil promoting, among other things, advancement of the status and rights of indigenous women, indigenous land rights, and indigenous education.

== Early life ==
Xakriabá was born in the municipality of São João das Missões in the Brazilian state of Minas Gerais. She attended school at the Xukurnuk Indigenous State School. Later, she both attended and taught indigenous education at the Federal University of Minas Gerais in 2013. Attending from 2016, Xakriabá earned her master's degree in education from the University of Brasília in 2018. She is the first member of her tribe to receive a graduate degree.

Xakriabá has been an activist for indigenous rights since she was 13 years old.

== Career ==
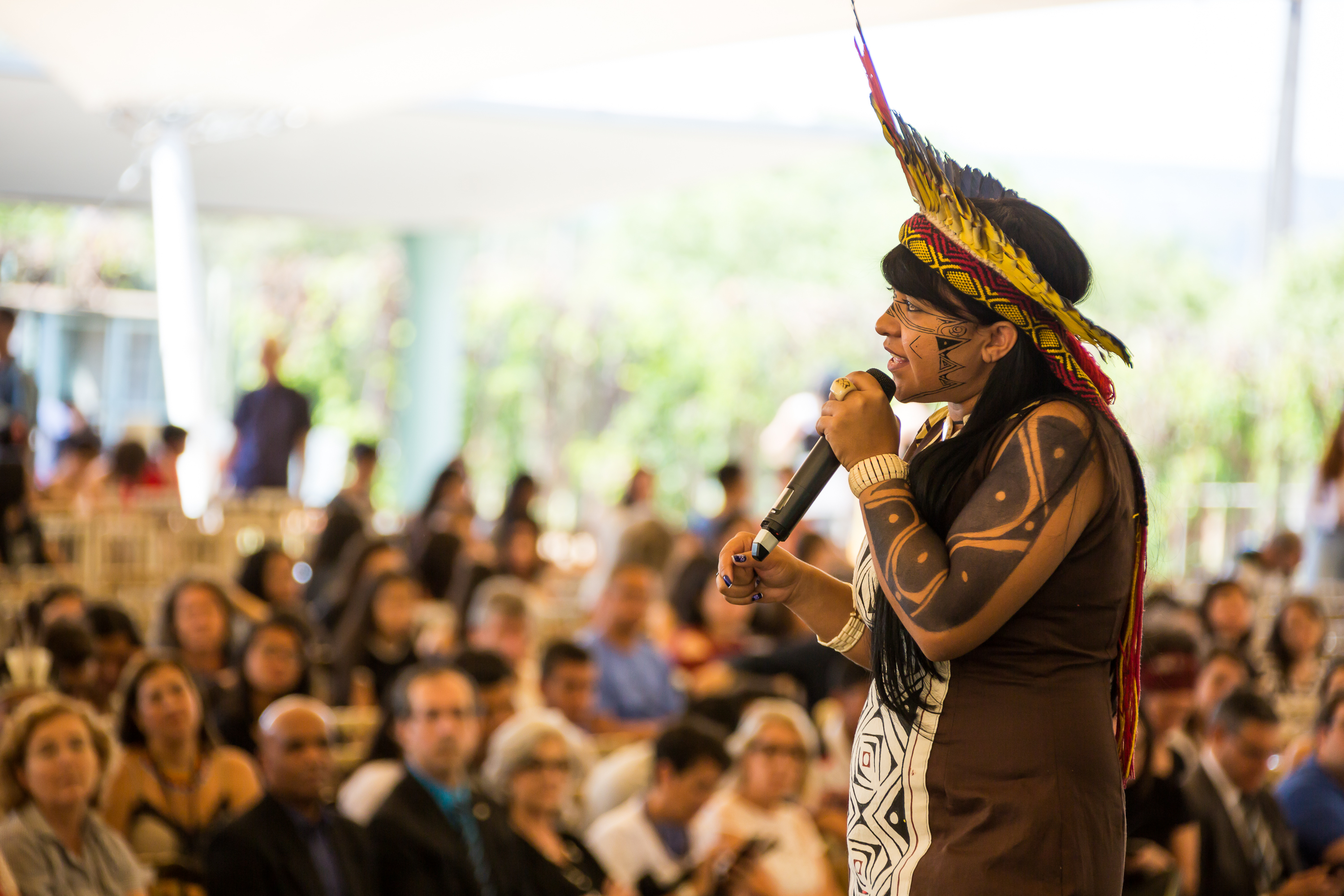
Xakriabá giving a lecture at the University of Brasília in 2018

=== Educational career ===
In 2015, Xakriabá became the first individual of indigenous descent to represent indigenous Brazilians in the Minas Gerais Department of Education. She held the position from 2015 to 2017. Xakriabá claims that the education indigenous youths in Brazil receive is not adequate because it does not teach them their rights to the land and their history. She also says that in western education all the knowledge comes from the teacher, but that in indigenous education everyone brings knowledge to share.

Since 2017, Xakriabá has spoken at various conferences and debates at universities in Brazil centered on indigenous rights, such as promoting indigenous education, and encouraging the revitalization of native languages in Brazil.

=== Political career ===
Xakriabá was opposed to a bill proposed in the Legislative Assembly of Minas Gerais that would prohibit speakers from wearing headdresses or "outlandish" costumes. She says that this bill was intended to limit the visibility of native speakers. In February 2019, she joined the advisory board for Socialism and Liberty Party representative Áurea Carolina from Minas Gerais. in the 2022 general election, Xakriabá became the first indigenous woman from Minas Gerais to be elected to the Federal Congress.

== Views ==
Xakriabá argues that present-day Brazilian education does not do enough to explore the history of minorities such as indigenous and African Brazilians, which she says results in these peoples feeling disconnected from their own history and ancestry. Xakriabá claims that education for indigenous Brazilian youth must make the connection between their ancestral land to their heritage, identity, and spirituality. Xakriabá has also been a critic of the observance of the Gregorian calendar holidays in Brazilian education, saying that western and Christian holidays have no significance for indigenous Brazilians.

She says that the absence of Brazilian women from positions of authority, in general, and indigenous women in particular, has to do with colonialism and western values. Xakriabá says that the lack of female representation is one of the causes for violence against indigenous women in Brazil. According to her, women's influence also is limited by the way Brazilian schools present the history of colonization, which makes native societies seem more primitive and patriarchal than what she believes they were.

Xakriabá says that the colonial processes of genocide and ethnocide begin with killing off the indigenous peoples, followed by the destruction of indigenous identity, and lastly, the destruction of indigenous knowledge. Xakriabá has defended indigenously directed and produced cinema, saying that it promotes native knowledge.

She is a strong critic of the policies of the government of Jair Bolsonaro, saying that it is the legacy of white supremacy and indigenous genocide that stems from colonialism. During the 2018 election, Xakriabá took part in protests against Bolsonaro in São Paulo.
