= Saul Alves Martins =

Brazilian anthropologist (1917–2009)

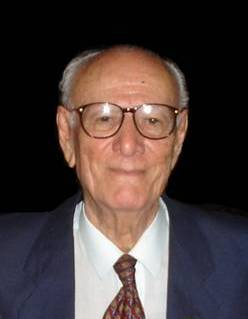
- Born: November 1, 1917; Januária
- Died: December 10, 2009 (aged 92); Belo Horizonte
- Scientific career
- Fields: Anthropology
- Workplaces: Universidade Federal de Minas Gerais

Saul Alves Martins (November 1, 1917, Januária, Brazil – December 10, 2009 Belo Horizonte) was a Brazilian anthropologist and folklorist, professor of Federal University of Minas Gerais (UFMG). Formed in Social Sciences, master and doctor in the area and for years devoted himself to the study and teaching of anthropology, with an emphasis on folklore and the tradition of Minas Gerais.

== Thesis ==
He defended his dissertation with the biography of the bandit Antonio Dó, and his doctoral thesis entitled "Contribution to the scientific study of the craft," both published in book form.

== Contributions to anthropology ==
As a writer attentive to the nuances of popular culture and to the forms of "traditional” sociability set inside of the country-side of Minas Gerais, especially the "rodas de São Gonçalo", Martins left a legacy for the description and systematization forms of cultural expression of Brazil's country-side. Defending a systematic study of these forms of expression, and deeply influenced by the positivism of Auguste Comte and Émile Durkheim, the anthropologist defended the folklore as a "first form" (or, using the durkheimnian jargon, the "elementary form") used in the culture of a society.

His name was given to the "Museum of Craft Saul Alves Martins", located in the city of Vespasiano/Minas Gerais/Brazil, categorized as one of the top five museums of popular culture in Brazil. One should notice that the museum has a collection of a large number of works donated by the anthropologist, the fruit of his research and fieldwork.

== Poetry ==
Martins was also a poet, publishing several books in this genre, as well as contributions to compilations. As an example of his production in this area is worth mentioning the poem "Flores do Campo" (trans: "Flowers of the Field") as one of the ten best of the contemporary sonnets in Minas Gerais, which led to the anthropologist the award received by the Academy of Letters of Minas Gerais in 1951. Here is a fragment of the sonnet:

Belas flores de pétalas bordadas, De raro odor e de aparência austera, Lindo jardim que a natureza gera Para alegrar a vida nas chapadas.	Fine flowers with embroidered petals, Of rare odor and austere appearance, Beautiful garden that nature generates To brighten the lives in uplands.

Besides his work as an anthropologist, he became a colonel and commanded battalions in Belo Horizonte. He is the author of the official anthem of the Military Police of Minas Gerais (PMMG), pointing to his poetic bias.

== Published works ==
- Canção da Terra.(Poesia). 1ª Edição .Belo Horizonte. Editora “O Lutador”. Belo Horizonte. 1952.
- A dança de São Gonçalo. Edição Mantiqueira. Belo Horizonte.1954.
- Opúsculo (1): artes e ofícios caseiros. Separata da Revista do Arquivo. CLXIV. Obra premiada pela Discoteca Pública Municipal de São Paulo, 1959.
- Os jogos infantis e as cantigas de roda. Edição do Centro Regional de Pesquisas Educacionais.MEC-INEP.Belo Horizonte, 1962.
- Opúsculo (2): o artesanato no Serro. Edição da Secretaria de Estado do Trabalho e Cultura Popular de Minas Gerais. Imprensa Oficial. Belo Horizonte, 1964.
- Folheto (2): uma oficina em cada lar. Edição da Secretaria de Estado do Trabalho e Cultura Popular de Minas Gerais. Belo Horizonte.Foi lema de Governo (Magalhães Pinto), 1964.
- Opúsculo (4): proteção ao artesanato. Edição da Secretaria de Estado do Trabalho e Cultura Popular de Minas Gerais. Imprensa Oficial. Belo Horizonte, 1966.
- Antônio Dó. Edição da Imprensa Oficial. Belo Horizonte. 1ª Edição, 1967.
- Opúsculo (5): o museu e as pesquisas artesanais. Editora da Academia Patense de Letras. Patos de Minas, 1969.
- Os Barranqueiros. Edição do Centro de Estudos Mineiros. UFMG. Belo Horizonte, 1969.
- Contribuição ao estudo científico do artesanato. Edição da Imprensa Oficial. Belo Horizonte, 1973.
- O artesanato na região de Barreiros. (Nota Prévia) Campus Avançado da UFMG. Conselho de Extensão.Barreiras. Bahia, 1973.
- Arte e artesanato folclóricos. Edição do MEC – FUNARTE – CDFB . Rio de Janeiro, 1976.
- Arte popular figurativa. Edições Carranca. Belo Horizonte, 1977.
- Folclore em Minas Gerais. Edição do MEC-FUNARTE-INF, com participação da UFMG. Rio de Janeiro. 1ª edição, 1982.
- O misterioso número três. Edições Carranca . Belo Horizonte, 1987.
- Folclore: teoria e método. Edição da Secretaria de Estado da Cultura de Minas Gerais. Edição da Imprensa Oficial. Belo Horizonte, 1986.
- Congado: família de três irmãos. Edição do SESC-MG. Belo Horizonte, 1988.
- Enciclopédia de literatura brasileira [contribuição a], de Afrânio Coutinho, edição do MEC, 1990.
- Folclore em Minas Gerais. Edição (ampliada) da UFMG. Belo Horizonte. 2ª edição, 1991.
- Canção da Terra.(Poesia). Edição do Autor. Belo Horizonte.2ª edição, 1998.
- Dicionário Histórico e Biográfico Brasileiro [contribuição ao], da Fundação Getúlio Vargas, publicado em 2002.
