= Manga, Minas Gerais =

Manga
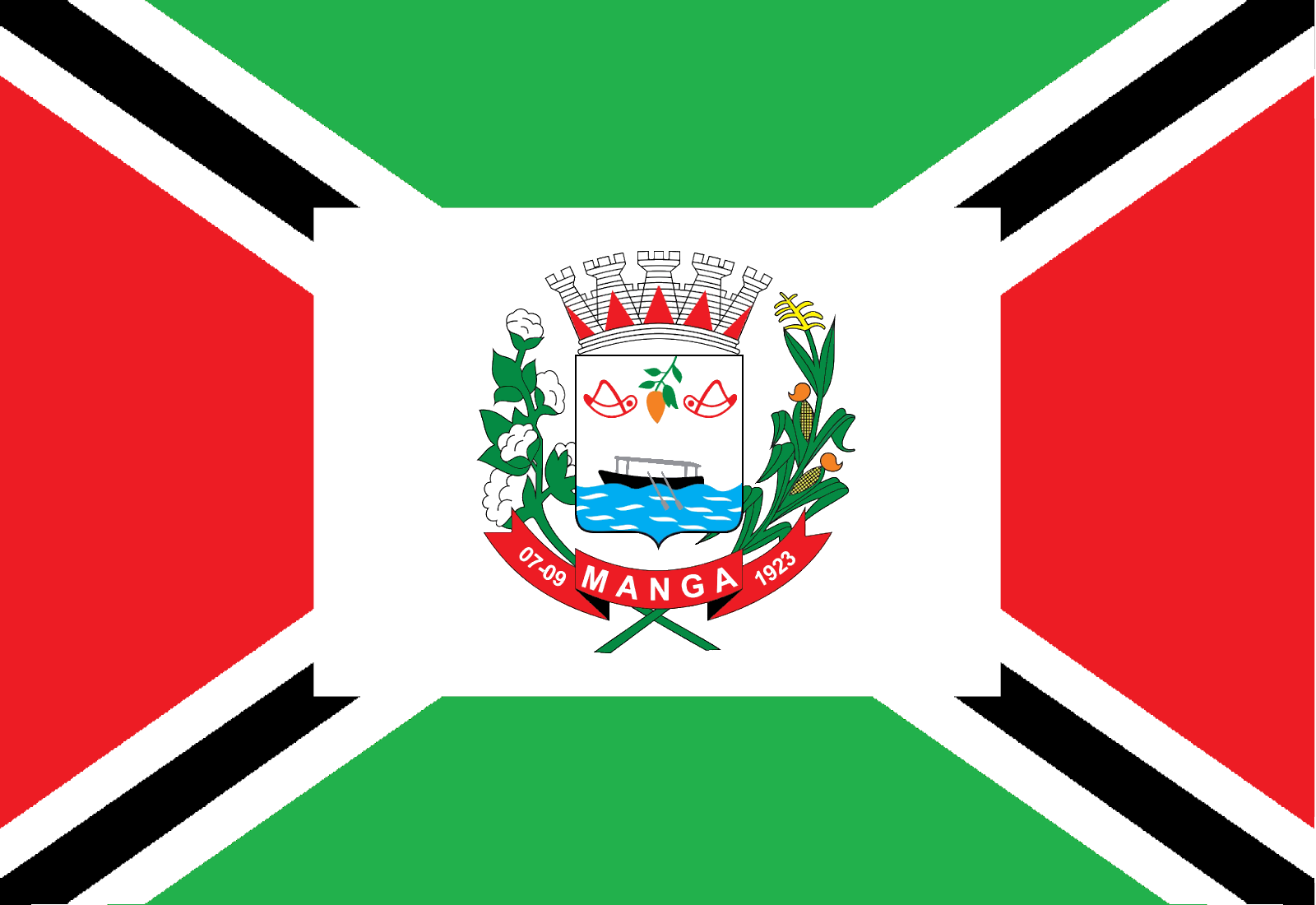
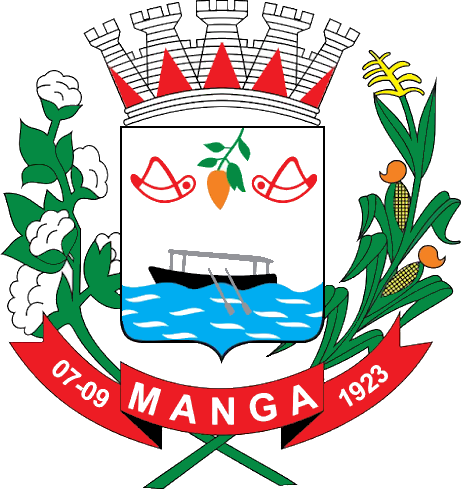
- Flag Coat of arms

- Location in the state of Minas Gerais

- Location in Brazil
- Coordinates: 14°45′21″S 43°55′55″W
- Country: Brazil
- State: Minas Gerais
- Mesoregion: North of Minas Gerais
- Microregion: Januária
- Incorporated (municipality): 7 September 1923

Government
  - Mayor: Joaquim de Oliveira Sá Filho

Area
  - Total: 1,950.184 km^{2} (752.970 sq mi)
- Elevation: 440 m (1,440 ft)

Population (2020)
  - Total: 18,226
  - Density: 9.3458/km^{2} (24.205/sq mi)
- Demonym: manguense
- Time zone: UTC−3 (BRT)
- CEP postal code: 39460-000
- Area code: 38
- Website: manga.mg.gov.br

Manga is a municipality in the north of the state of Minas Gerais in Brazil. It is located on the left bank of the São Francisco River. It is connected to Januária by paved BR-135, anis 112 km away. Neighboring municipalities are Matias Cardoso, Montalvânia, Miravânia, Juvenília, and São João das Missões. The distance to the state capital is 720 km. As of 2020 the population was 18,226 in an area of 1,950 km^{2} (750 sq mi).

The economy is based on agriculture with emphasis on cattle raising. There were 54,000 head in 2006. The main agricultural crops were bananas, lemons, mangoes, rice, corn, manioc, sorghum, sugarcane, and mamona (castor oil plant). The GDP was R$76,786,000 in 2005.

This municipality is extremely isolated from major population centers and suffers from drought and poor soils. It is one of the poorest in the state and in the country.

== Indexes ==
- Municipal Human Development Index: .603 (2000)
- State ranking: 829 out of 853 municipalities as of 2000
- National ranking: 4,603 out of 5,138 municipalities as of 2000
- Illiteracy rate: 28.13% (older than 16) – the rate for the state was 11.96% (2000)
- Infant mortality rate: 34.48 – the rate for the state was 17.40 (2000)
- Urbanization rate: 63% – the rate for the state was 80% (2000)
- Urban area connected to sewers: 0.70% – the state was 81.39% (2000)
- Urban area with garbage collection: 71.56% – the state was 91.37 (2000)

== See also ==
- List of municipalities in Minas Gerais
