= Artemisa Xakriabá =

Brazilian human rights and climate activist

- Born: Artemisa Barbosa Ribeiro; São João das Missões, Brazil
- Occupations: Psychology student, Environmental Activist, Human rights activist

Artemisa Barbosa Ribeiro (known as Artemisa Xakriabá) is a Brazilian human rights activist. A leader of the Articulation of Indigenous Peoples of Brazil, her work focuses on the Amazon jungle and environmental destruction.

Artemisa Xakriabá belongs to the Xacriabas indigenous people located in the north of the state of Minas Gerais, in the southeast of Brazil. She has expressed the problems suffered by her community in the fight to protect its territory from environmental damage from mining.

She is a representative of the indigenous and traditional communities that are part of the Global Alliance of Territorial Communities.

On several occasions, she denounced Brazilian President Jair Bolsonaro for his policies regarding the Amazon and for the government's refusal to take measures to protect the Amazon forest.

Artemisa spoke at the global climate strike held on Friday, September 20, 2019, in New York, before thousands of young people around the world mobilized by global warming and climate change, which concluded with comments from indigenous leaders, activists and organizers. On this occasion, she was dressed in the headdress of her ethnic group, a feather headband and parts of her body and face painted.

She was present at the Climate Action Summit convened by the UN together with Greta Thunberg. She also accompanied Thunberg to demand solutions from the United States Congress in Washington, D.C. With determination, she managed to reach several US senators and deputies to present an open letter from the indigenous people who make up the Global Alliance of Territorial Communities.

She lives in Ribeirão Preto, where she studies psychology and music.

== See also ==
- Amazon Basin
- September 2019 climate strikes
- Célia Xakriabá
