= Icaraí de Minas =

Town and municipality in the state of Minas Gerais, Brazil

Coordinates: 16°13′11″S 44°54′16″W

- Municipality
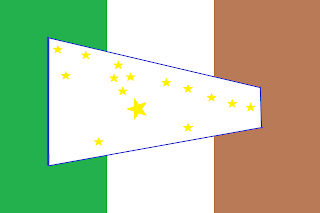
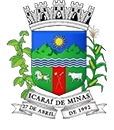
- Flag Coat of arms
- Interactive map of Icaraí de Minas
- Country: Brazil
- State: Minas Gerais
- Region: Southeast
- Time zone: UTC−3 (BRT)

Location of Icaraí de Minas in the state of Minas Gerais

Icaraí de Minas is a municipality in the north of the state of Minas Gerais in Brazil. As of 2020 the population was 12,097 in an area of 617 km^{2} (238 sq mi).

- The elevation of the municipal seat is 595 meters.
- It became a municipality in 1993.
- The postal code (CEP) is 39318-000.
- Statistical microregion: Januária

Icaraí de Minas is located south of São Francisco and northwest of Montes Claros. It is connected to major population centers by dirt roads.

== Economy ==
The economy is based on agriculture with emphasis on cattle raising. There were 34,000 head in 2006. The main agricultural crops were corn, manioc, sugarcane, and rice. The GDP was R$24,717,000 in 2005.

=== Energy Innovation ===
The municipality hosts a project of solar microgeneration in the community intended to allow families to reduce the value of the electricity bill by up to 80%. This low-cost innovation could herald major advances in the process of energy transition both in small cities and metropolitan districts.

== Status ==
- Municipal Human Development Index: .650 (2000)
- State ranking: 742 out of 853 municipalities as of 2000
- National ranking: 3,776 out of 5,138 municipalities as of 2000

(For the complete list see Frigoletto)

== See also ==
- List of municipalities in Minas Gerais
