= Januária Airport =

Januária Airport Aeroporto de Januária
- IATA: JNA; ICAO: SNJN

Summary
- Airport type: Public
- Serves: Januária
- Closed: 2021 (temporarily)
- Time zone: BRT (UTC−03:00)
- Elevation AMSL: 480 m (1,570 ft)
- Coordinates: 15°28′29″S 044°23′11″W

Map
- Location in Brazil JNA (Brazil)

Runways
Direction	Length		Surface
Direction	m	ft	Surface
08/26	1,200	3,937	Asphalt
- Sources: ANAC

Januária Airport (IATA: JNA, ICAO: SNJN) is the airport serving Januária, Brazil. It was closed in 2021.

== History ==
On July 23, 2021 the operational license of the facility was revoked. However, in 2026, the facility was undergoing a process of re-certification.

== Access ==
The airport is located 5 km (3 mi) northwest from downtown Januária.

== See also ==
- List of airports in Brazil
