= Pedras de Maria da Cruz =

Human settlement in Brazil

Coordinates: 15°36′06″S 44°23′22″W

- Municipality
- Interactive map of Pedras de Maria da Cruz
- Country: Brazil
- State: Minas Gerais
- Region: Southeast
- Time zone: UTC−3 (BRT)

Location of Pedras de Maria da Cruz in the state of Minas Gerais

Pedras de Maria da Cruz is a municipality in the north of the state of Minas Gerais in Brazil. As of 2020 the population was 12,212 in an area of 1,520 km^{2} (590 sq mi). The elevation of the municipal seat is 476 meters. It became a municipality in 1993. The postal code (CEP) is 39492-000 and it belonged to the statistical microregion of Januária

Pedras de Maria da Cruz is located on the right bank of the São Francisco River. It is connected Januária by paved BR-135. The distance is 20 km.

The economy is based on agriculture with emphasis on cattle raising. There were 51,000 head in 2006. The main agricultural crops were pineapple, sugarcane, bananas, mangoes, coconuts, and corn. The GDP was R$27,897,000 in 2005. Irrigation from the São Francisco River allows for production of tropical fruits.

This municipality is extremely isolated from major population centers and suffers from drought and poor soils. It is one of the poorest in the state and in the country. Like many impoverished districts it fought for municipal autonomy to apply for government assistance programs.

- Municipal Human Development Index: .644 (2000)
- State ranking: 782 out of 853 municipalities as of 2000
- National ranking: 4,044 out of 5,138 municipalities as of 2000
- Health clinics: 3

== See also ==
- List of municipalities in Minas Gerais
