= Januária =

Municipality in Minas Gerais, Brazil

- Municipality
- Municipality of Januária
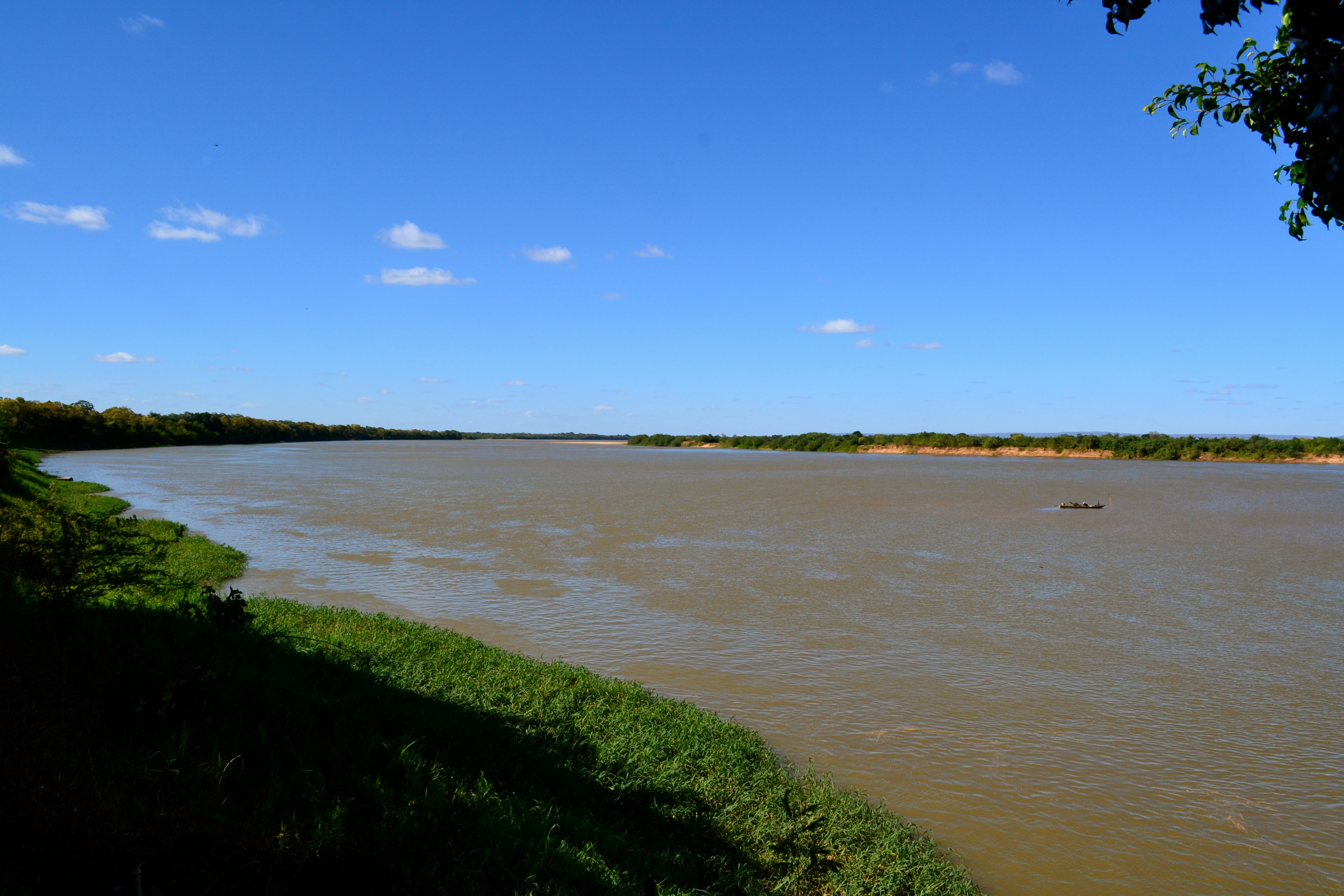
- São Francisco River at Januária

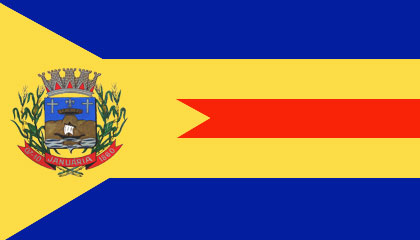
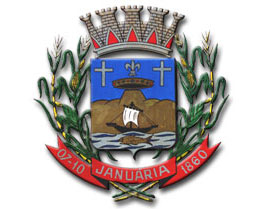
- Flag Coat of arms

- Location in Minas Gerais

- Location in Minas Gerais Location in Brazil
- Coordinates: 15°29′16″S 44°21′43″W
- Country: Brazil
- Region: Southeast
- State: Minas Gerais
- Intermediate region: Montes Claros
- Immediate region: Januária
- Municipality established: June 30, 1833
- Municipality installed: April 22, 1834
- City status: October 7, 1860
- Districts: Januária (seat), Brejo do Amparo, Levinópolis, Pandeiros, Riacho da Cruz, São Joaquim, Tejuco, and Várzea Bonita

Government
  - Mayor: Maurício Almeida (Podemos)
  - Term: 2025–2028

Area
  - Total: 6,661.588 km^{2} (2,572.054 sq mi)
- Elevation: 434 m (1,424 ft)

Population (2022 census)
  - Total: 65,150
  - Estimate (2025): 67,123
  - Density: 9.780/km^{2} (25.33/sq mi)
- Demonym: januarense
- Time zone: UTC−3 (BRT)
- HDI (2010): 0.658 (medium)
- GDP per capita (2023): R$15,970.66
- Website: www.januaria.mg.gov.br

Januária is a municipality in northern Minas Gerais, Brazil, on the left bank of the São Francisco River. It had a population of 65,150 in the 2022 census, with an estimated population of 67,123 in 2025, in an area of 6,661.588 km^{2} (2,572.054 sq mi). It is part of the Immediate Geographic Region of Januária, within the Intermediate Geographic Region of Montes Claros.

== Municipal limits ==
Januária is limited in the north by the state of Bahia, Bonito de Minas and Cônego Marinho, in the south with São Francisco, in the east with Pedras de Maria da Cruz and Itacarambi, and in the west with Chapada Gaúcha.

== Microregion ==
Januária is also a statistical microregion (number 31) consisting of 16 municipalities: Bonito de Minas, Chapada Gaúcha, Cônego Marinho, Icaraí de Minas, Itacarambi, Januária, Juvenília, Manga, Matias Cardoso, Miravânia, Montalvânia, Pedras de Maria da Cruz, Pintópolis, São Francisco, São João das Missões, and Urucuia. The area is 15,945.80 km^{2} and the population was 246,071 in 2000.

== Districts ==
Due to the size of the municipality there are several districts. They are Brejo do Amparo, Levinópolis, Pandeiros, Riacho da Cruz, São Joaquim, Tejuco, and Várzea Bonita.

== Geography ==
The municipal seat lies at an elevation of 434 metres. The average annual temperature is 26 °C (79 °F). The climate is tropical with transition to semi-arid and its vegetation is composed of cerrado (savanna) and clusters of caatinga (thorn bush). The size of the municipality ranks it among the 75 largest municipalities of the state of Minas Gerais.

=== Climate ===
Climate data for Januária (1991–2020 normals, extremes 1931–present)
Month	Jan	Feb	Mar	Apr	May	Jun	Jul	Aug	Sep	Oct	Nov	Dec	Year
Record high °C (°F)	39.2 (102.6)	38.9 (102.0)	37.8 (100.0)	38.1 (100.6)	36.3 (97.3)	36.5 (97.7)	38.6 (101.5)	37.9 (100.2)	41.8 (107.2)	41.6 (106.9)	41.5 (106.7)	39.4 (102.9)	41.8 (107.2)
Mean daily maximum °C (°F)	31.7 (89.1)	32.1 (89.8)	31.8 (89.2)	32.0 (89.6)	31.4 (88.5)	30.7 (87.3)	30.6 (87.1)	32.0 (89.6)	34.1 (93.4)	34.7 (94.5)	31.9 (89.4)	31.2 (88.2)	32.0 (89.6)
Daily mean °C (°F)	25.4 (77.7)	25.5 (77.9)	25.3 (77.5)	24.8 (76.6)	23.2 (73.8)	21.9 (71.4)	21.5 (70.7)	22.9 (73.2)	25.4 (77.7)	27.0 (80.6)	25.7 (78.3)	25.3 (77.5)	24.5 (76.1)
Mean daily minimum °C (°F)	20.5 (68.9)	20.3 (68.5)	20.4 (68.7)	19.2 (66.6)	16.8 (62.2)	14.7 (58.5)	14.0 (57.2)	15.2 (59.4)	18.2 (64.8)	20.8 (69.4)	21.0 (69.8)	20.7 (69.3)	18.5 (65.3)
Record low °C (°F)	13.5 (56.3)	12.9 (55.2)	12.4 (54.3)	11.0 (51.8)	7.2 (45.0)	7.2 (45.0)	7.9 (46.2)	8.1 (46.6)	9.7 (49.5)	12.5 (54.5)	11.2 (52.2)	11.7 (53.1)	7.2 (45.0)
Average precipitation mm (inches)	162.0 (6.38)	121.5 (4.78)	142.0 (5.59)	36.9 (1.45)	8.6 (0.34)	1.5 (0.06)	0.2 (0.01)	0.9 (0.04)	8.0 (0.31)	52.9 (2.08)	191.6 (7.54)	208.1 (8.19)	934.2 (36.78)
Average precipitation days (≥ 1.0 mm)	9.4	6.7	8.4	3.3	0.8	0.2	0.1	0.2	1.0	4.6	11.7	11.9	58.3
Average relative humidity (%)	75.4	72.6	76.8	72.6	67.0	62.7	56.3	50.7	48.6	53.7	71.0	76.8	65.4
Average dew point °C (°F)	20.9 (69.6)	20.8 (69.4)	21.0 (69.8)	19.9 (67.8)	17.5 (63.5)	15.1 (59.2)	13.4 (56.1)	12.8 (55.0)	13.9 (57.0)	16.3 (61.3)	19.7 (67.5)	20.8 (69.4)	17.7 (63.9)
Mean monthly sunshine hours	228.8	216.7	226.8	250.5	265.8	264.2	281.9	284.7	252.7	233.9	168.7	176.4	2,851.1
Source 1: NOAA
Source 2: Instituto Nacional de Meteorologia (sun 1981–2010

== Communications ==
The most important route of communication with the rest of the state is the BR-135. A modern bridge has substituted the ferry on the river. The distance to Belo Horizonte, the state capital, is 613 km.

Januária lies in an agro-pastoral region. Some changes have been implemented in recent years such as irrigation, soybean cultivation, and the decline of cotton cultivation.

== Economic activities ==
Important crops are sugar cane (from which it inherited the fame of having one of the best rums in Brazil), corn, manioc and beans. Mango, breadfruit, coconut, orange, avocado, cashew, and bananas are also produced.

Like almost all the cities in this area of Minas Gerais cattle raising is an important economic activity. In 2006 there were 62,000 head—small when the size of the municipality is taken into consideration.

Small industries produce rum, vinegar, cotton by-products, shoes, and furniture.

Motor vehicles in 2007

- Automobiles: 2,271
- Pickup trucks: 584
- Number of inhabitants per motor vehicle: 23

Main crops in area 2006

- Rice: 600 ha.
- Corn: 3,000 ha.
- Manioc: 2,500 ha.
- Beans: 2,500 ha.
- Sugarcane: 500 ha.

Farm data for 2006

- Number of farms: 3,349
- Agricultural area: 120,016 ha.
- Planted area: 9,700 ha.
- Area of natural pasture: 55, 113 ha.
- Workers related to the producer: 10,147
- Workers not related to the producer: 1,050
- Number of farms with tractors: 97

From this data we can see that the planted area is small compared to the total agricultural area and that there are many people still living in the rural zone of the municipality. The number of tractors per farm was very low.

== Health and education (2005) ==
- Hospitals: 2 with 113 beds
- Health clinics: 21
- Primary schools: 95
- Primary school enrollment: 15,411
- Middle schools: 13
- Middle school enrollment: 239

== Human development ==
Januária had a Municipal Human Development Index of 0.658 in 2010.

== History ==
The first explorers arrived in 1553 looking for gold. They were led by the Spaniards Francisco Bruza de Espinosa and Father João de Apicuelta Navarro. The first settlement was called Brejo do Salgado, due to the salinity of the streams and the marshes. The first sugarcane mill was set up and soon a chapel followed dedicated to Nossa Senhora do Amparo. In 1833 Brejo do Salgado became a "vila", or town and the seat was transferred to the left bank of the São Francisco River, the name being changed to Januária, in homage to Princess Januária of Brazil, daughter of the Emperor Pedro I. In 1860 Januária was elevated to the category of city. The surrounding area was immense with several districts such as São Caetano do Japoré (today the city of Manga), São João das Missões, Jacaré (today the city of Itacarambi), Conceição de Morrinhos (today the city of Matias Cardoso), Mocambo (today a district of Levinópolis) all created in 1903.

Districts created and lost

- In 1911 the district of Pedras de Maria da Cruz was created.
- In 1923 the districts of Manga and Matias Cardoso were lost but the district of Cônego Marinho was added.
- In 1938 the district of Missões was created
- In 1953 Riacho da Cruz (ex-Bela Vista) was created.
- In 1962 the districts of Itacarambi and Missões were lost.
- In 1976 the districts of Bonito, São Joaquim and Tejuco were created
- In 1982, São Pedro das Tabocas was created.
- In 1992 the district of Pedras de Maria da Cruz (hoje Maria da Cruz) was lost
- In 1995 the districts of Bonito (today the city of Bonito de Minas) and Cônego Marinho (today the city of Cônego Marinho) were created.

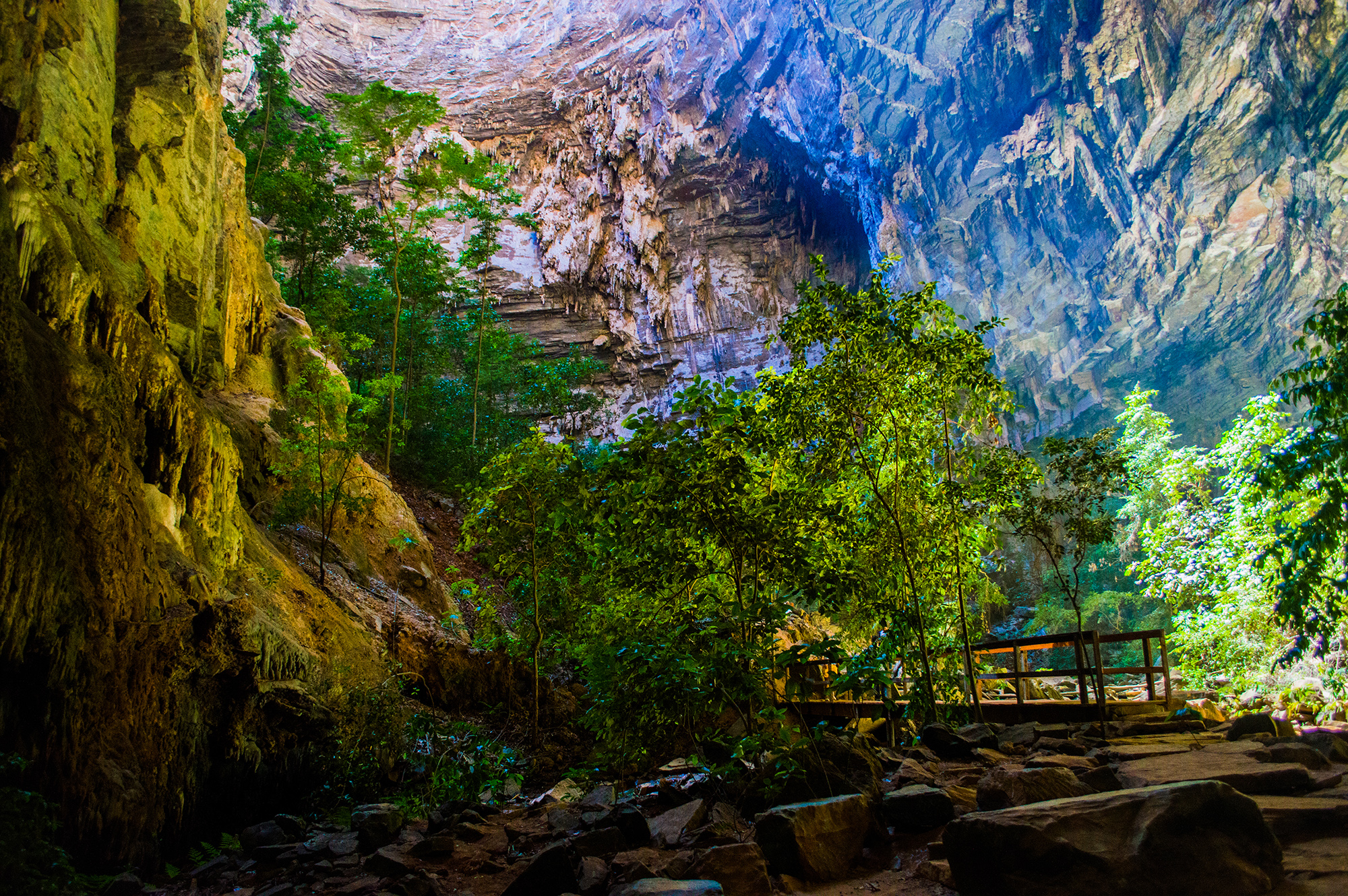
Interior of the Janelão cave

== Tourism ==
The location on the banks of one of the most important rivers in Brazil opens up many recreational possibilities. In the months of July, August, and September when the river is low and relatively clean there are extensive beaches along the river sought after by swimmers and sunbathers. Nearby there is a fifteen meter high waterfall called the Cachoeira de Pandeiros which has a large area for swimming. In the city itself the nineteenth century architecture has been preserved in many government buildings and private houses, with the most important being the Casa da Memoria (1910) and the City Hall (1890). The municipality contains part of the Cavernas do Peruaçu National Park, which holds the dramatic Gruta do Janelão, a large limestone cave.

== Transportation ==
The city is served by Januária Airport 5 km (3 mi) to the northwest of the city.

== Notable people ==
- Wilson Reis, MMA fighter

== See also ==
- List of municipalities in Minas Gerais
