= Gruta do Janelão =

Limestone cave in the Cavernas do Peruaçu National Park, Brazil

Coordinates: 15.1167073°S 44.2414284°W

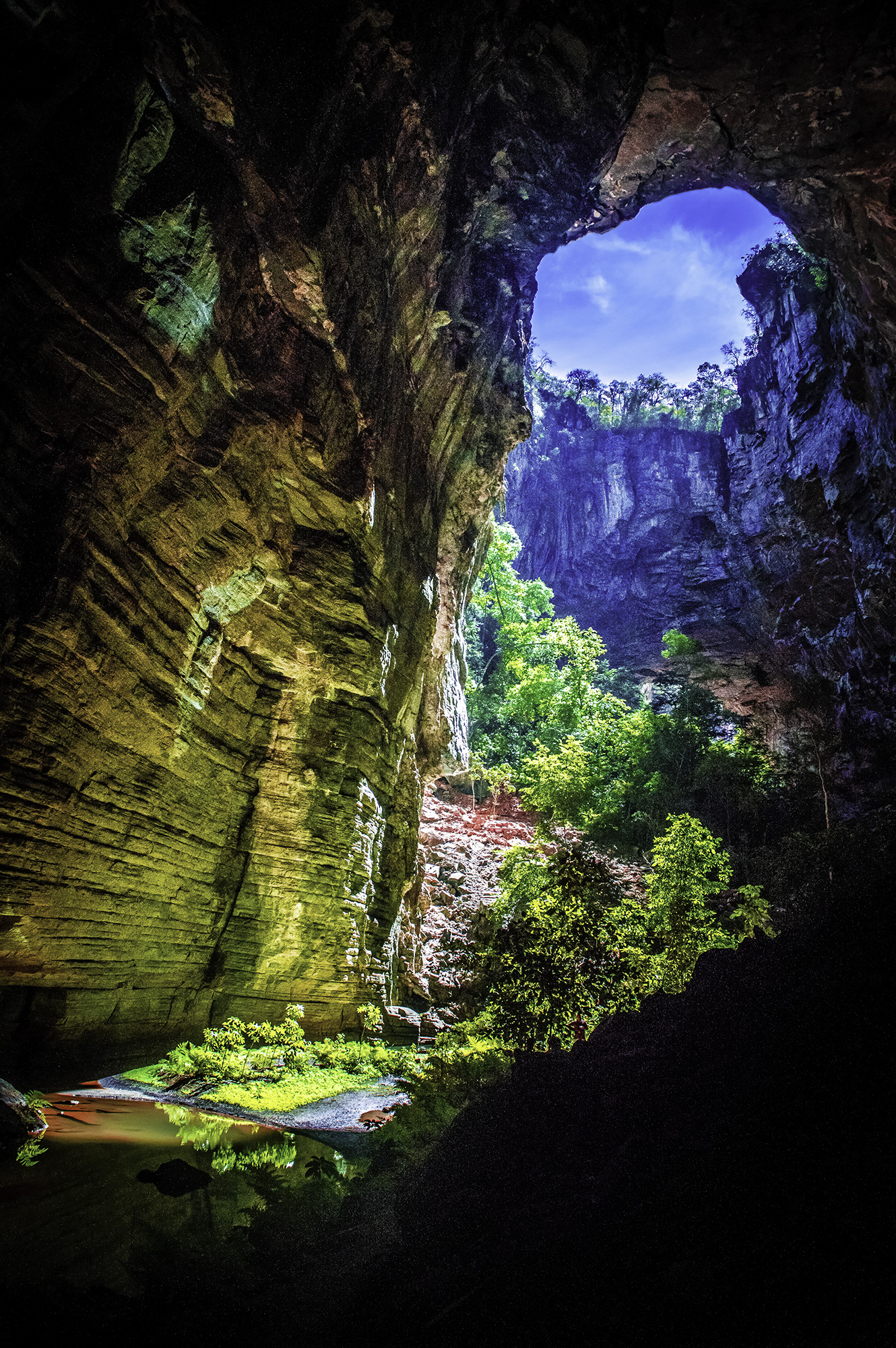
An entrance to the Janelão cave

Gruta do Janelão (MG-199) is a limestone cave located inside the Cavernas do Peruaçu National Park, in the municipality of Januária, Minas Gerais, Brazil. This cave is the largest in the valley, totaling 4,740 m of horizontal extension and elevation of 176m. Because it has several skylights letting the sun in, small forests that resemble Japanese gardens by the delicacy and harmony are formed everywhere, all by the banks of the Peruaçu River which runs through the Janelão grotto. It has the largest stalactite already registered measuring 28 meters long.

== Geology ==
In the northwest of the state of Minas Gerais, the left bank of the Rio Sao Francisco shows a set of caves and archaeological sites with cave paintings scattered on a ten feet wall which stand out in bold and striking colors and a doline is the big window through which a panoramic view over the entrance of the cave and its first two of many skylights that would spread over the next 3.5 km of the path with interesting stalagmite and stalactite formations appearing along the way,.

The Peruaçu river runs throughout the internal area of the cave and is also a major attraction. The vegetation outside the cave is lushy with trees measuring up to 60 meters tall.

== See also ==
- List of caves in Brazil
