= Juvenília =

Municipality of Brazil

Coordinates: 14°15′48″S 44°09′13″W

- Municipality
- Flag Coat of arms
- Interactive map of Juvenília
- Country: Brazil
- State: Minas Gerais
- Region: Southeast
- Time zone: UTC−3 (BRT)

Location of Juvenília in the state of Minas Gerais

Juvenília is a municipality in the north of the state of Minas Gerais in Brazil. As of 2020 the population was 5,715 in an area of 1,065 km^{2} (411 sq mi).

- The elevation of the municipal seat is 445 meters.
- It became a municipality in 1997 after being emancipated by State Law No. 12030 (21 December 1995).
- The postal code (CEP) is 39470-000.
- Statistical microregion: Januária

Juvenília is located on the Rio Carinhanha, which forms the boundary with the state of Bahia. It is the most northerly municipality in the state of Minas Gerais and is farther north than Brasília and Itabuna in the state of Bahia. It is connected to Montalvânia by a dirt road.

The economy is based on agriculture with emphasis on cattle raising. There were 27,000 head in 2006. The main agricultural crops were cotton, rice, corn, manioc, sugarcane, and mamona—castor oil plant. The GDP was R$17,275,000 in 2005.

This municipality is extremely isolated from major population centers and suffers from drought and poor soils. It is one of the poorest in the state and in the country.

- Municipal Human Development Index: .625 (2000)
- State ranking: 796 out of 853 municipalities as of 2000
- National ranking: 4,209 out of 5,138 municipalities as of 2000

(For the complete list see Frigoletto)

== See also ==
- List of municipalities in Minas Gerais
