= Traditional peoples in Brazil =

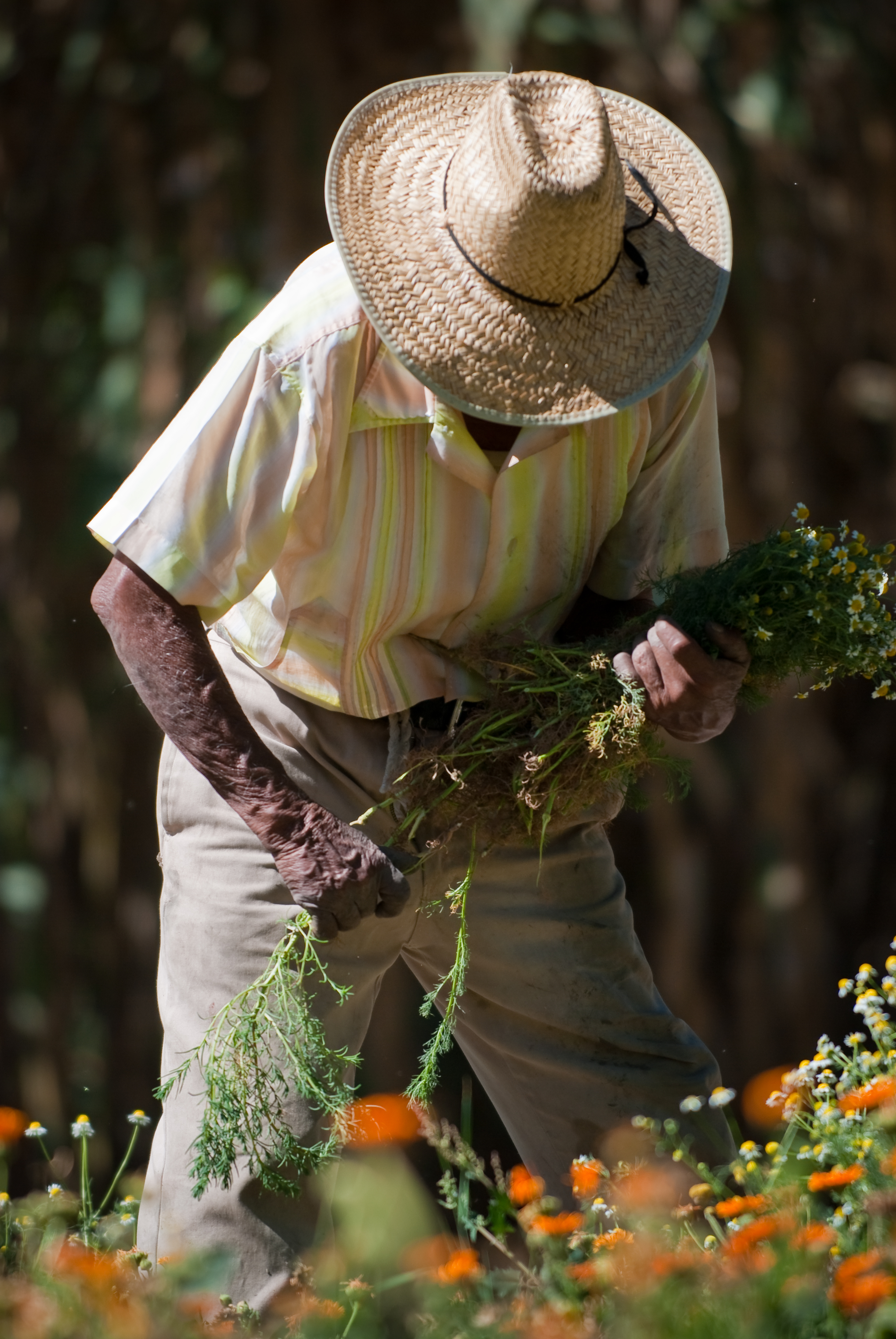

Traditional Populations, Traditional Peoples or Traditional Communities, under Brazilian law, are groups that have a culture that is different from the prevailing local culture and that maintain a way of life closely linked to the natural environment in which they live. Through its own forms - social organization, the use of territory and natural resources (with a subsistence relationship) - its socio-cultural-religious reproduction using knowledge transmitted orally and in daily practice.

Officially, according to the Federal Government, to be recognized as traditional, it is necessary to carry out daily production practices based on sustainable development. It is estimated that in Brazil around 4.5 million people are part of these communities, occupying 25% of the national territory.

The term "traditional peoples" is defined as a larger legal category which includes, but is neither exclusive nor replacing of, Brazil's indigenous peoples.

== Government recognition ==
In 2007, the Federal Government of Brazil formally recognized the existence of so-called traditional populations (Presidential Decree 6040 of February 7), expanding the recognition partially made in the 1988 Constitution (only indigenous and quilombola) to cover the following communities: caboclo; caiçara; extractive; jangadeiro; fisherman; riverside; tapper; in addition to indigenous and quilombola. The law also established the "National Policy for the Sustainable Development of Traditional Peoples and Communities" (PNPCT), subordinated to the Ministry of the Environment.

In 2016, Decree 8750 was issued by President Dilma Rousseff, establishing the National Council of Traditional Peoples and Communities (CNPCT). It was initially established as an arm of the Ministry of Social Development and Fight against Hunger. In 2018, under the presidencies of Michel Temer and later Jair Bolsonaro, the council was shifted to the Ministry of Woman, Family and Human Rights as per Decree 9.465.

In 2023, under President Lula da Silva, the council was expanded and shifted to the Ministry of Environment and Climate Change. In addition, Lula established a National Secretariat for Traditional Peoples and Communities and Sustainable Rural Development under the same ministry. Other offices, particularly those concerning the quilombola communities, are housed under the Ministry of Racial Equality and other independent government agencies, such as INCRA and the Palmares Cultural Foundation.

== List of traditional communities ==
People/Communities	Habitat	Activity	References
Andirobeiras		use of the Andirobeira tree	
Apanhadores de Flores Sempre Viva	Diamantina, Minas Gerais	flower picking	
Benzedeiros			
Caatingueiros	caatinga	animal husbandry	
Caboclos			
Caiçaras	Rio de Janeiro, São Paulo and Paraná	fishing	
Caipira	Paraná		
Castanheiras	Amazon		
Catadores de Mangaba	sergipe		
Chapadeiros			
Cipozeiros	Santa Catarina, Paraná and São Paulo	Imbe plant harvest	
Extrativistas	Marajó, Pará	açaí, fishing, shrimp	
Extrativistas marinho			
Faxinalenses	Paraná	animal husbandry	
Fundo de Pasto	Bahia, Pernambuco and Piauí	raising goats and sheep	
Geraizeiros	Minas Gerais	agriculture, livestock and collection	
Ilhéus	Paraná	fish catcher	
Indigenous peoples	in all regions	fishing, gathering and small farming	
Isqueiros	Pantanal, Mato Grosso	fishing bait collector	
Jangadeiros			
Marisqueiros			
Morroquianos	Caceres, Mato Grosso	smallholders	
Pantaneiros	Pantanal, Mato Grosso	livestock	
Pescadores Artesanais		fishing	
Piaçaveiros	amazon	piassava fiber processing	
Pomeranos			
Terreiros	in all regions		
Quebradeiras de Coco Babaçu	Maranhão, Pará, Piauí und Tocantins	babassu fruit harvest	
Quilombolas	in all regions		
Retireiros	Northeast of Mato Grosso	livestock and agriculture	
Ribeirinhos	amazon	fishing, gathering and farming	
Roma			
Seringueiros	amazon	rubber cones	
Vazanteiros	Minas Gerais	Agriculture	
Veredeiros	North of Minas Gerais, Bahia and Midwest		
