= Pintópolis =

Brazilian municipality

Coordinates: 16°03′19″S 45°08′47″W

- Municipality
- Interactive map of Pintópolis
- Country: Brazil
- State: Minas Gerais
- Region: Southeast
- Time zone: UTC−3 (BRT)

Location of Pintópolis in the state of Minas Gerais

Pintópolis is a municipality in the north of the state of Minas Gerais in Brazil. As of 2020 the population was 7,524 inhabitants in an area of 1,228.736 km^{2}.

It is 45 km from São Francisco and 78 km from Urucuia, which are the closest municipalities to Pintópolis. Its income is mainly concentrated in the extraction of charcoal, agriculture and livestock of dairy and beef cattle. The central point of the city is 480 meters above sea level.

== See also ==
- List of municipalities in Minas Gerais
