= Jaíba Biological Reserve =

- Reserva Biológica do Jaíba
- IUCN category Ia (strict nature reserve)
- Location within Brazil
- Coordinates: 15.068°S 43.76°W
- Designation: biological reserve
- Authorized: 6,358 hectares (15,710 acres)
- Created: 1973

Jaíba Biological Reserve (Portuguese: Reserva Biológica do Jaíba) is a biological reserve in Minas Gerais, Brazil.

== Location ==
The reserve of 6,358 hectares (15,710 acres) of deciduous forest was created in the municipality of Matias Cardoso on 4 July 1973 as Jaiba Forest Park, then became Jaíba Biological Reserve on 30 December 1994. The reserve is in the São Francisco River Basin. It is part of the Jaiba Sistema de Áreas Protegidas (SAP), which was created as a condition of approval of the Jaiba Irrigation Project. The other fully protected units in the Jaiba SAP are the Serra Azul Biological Reserve, Verde Grande State Park and Lagoa do Cajueiro State Park, giving a fully protected area of 58,565 hectares (144,720 acres). The SAP also includes two Environment Protection Areas totalling 94,500 hectares (234,000 acres). In 2010 a single advisory board was established to oversee all the conservation units of the Jaiba SAP.

== Environment ==
The climate is tropical, with temperatures ranging from 18.2 to 30.8 °C (64.8 to 87.4 °F) and average temperature of 23.6 °C (74.5 °F). Annual rainfall averages 1,156.1 millimetres (45.52 in), mostly falling in the summer. The reserve contains deciduous forest (Dry Forest) that is home to agoutis, lizards, monkeys and various species of birds. It belongs to the Caatinga domain. A 2007 study of the vegetation found 27 families with 55 species. 15 species were from the family Fabaceae and 4 species from the family Nyctaginaceae. The largest number of individuals was from the Tabebuia ochracea species, followed by Combretum leprosum and Terminalia fagifolia.

== Conservation ==
As of 2009 the State Biological Reserve was a "strict nature reserve" under IUCN protected area category Ia. There are trails in the reserve that are often used by students at technical schools in the region, and it is also an important research area.

== Sources ==
- Governo Antonio Anastasia: Conselho Consultivo do Sistema de Áreas Protegidas do Jaíba toma posse (in Portuguese), Minas Sustentável, 28 April 2010
- Josefina Ivonete Fagundes (2005), Sistema de Áreas Protegidas - SAP (in Portuguese), IEF - Instituto Estadual de Florestal - MG, archived from the original on 2017-02-16
- Reserva Biológica do Jaíba (in Portuguese), IEF: Instituto Estadual de Florestas
- Tiago Sousa Vieira; Lucas Soares Amaral; Gustavo Antomar Batista Gontijo; José Roberto Scolforo; José Marcio de Mello; Charles Plínio de Castro Silva (July 2007), "Análise de estrutura e diversidade florística da Reserva Biológica do Jaíba", Revista Brasileira de Biociências (in Portuguese), 5 (2), Porto Alegre
- Triana, Elisa (29 May 2009), "Strict Nature Reserves in Brazil", The Encyclopedia of Earth
