= São João das Missões =

Human settlement in Brazil

Coordinates: 14°52′55″S 44°04′55″W

- Municipality
- Interactive map of São João das Missões
- Country: Brazil
- State: Minas Gerais
- Region: Southeast
- Time zone: UTC−3 (BRT)

Location of São João das Missões in the state of Minas Gerais

São João das Missões is a municipality in the north of the Brazilian state of Minas Gerais. As of 2020 the population was 13,125 in a total area of 675 km^{2} (261 sq mi). The elevation is 501 meters. It became a municipality in 1997.

São João das Missões is part of the statistical microregion of Januária. It is located 21 kilometers southwest of Manga, which is on the São Francisco River. To the south is the Parque Nacional Caverna do Peruaçu. The nearest regional center is Januária. Twenty percent of the population lived in the urban area and 40 percent was of the Xacriabá tribe.

The administrative division of the municipality consists of the municipal seat (distrito da sede), the district of Rancharia, 12 villages, and 21 hamlets of the Xacriabá Indian tribe. Surrounding municipalities are: Miravânia, Manga and Itacarambi.

This is one of the poorest municipalities in the state and in the country. Isolation and drought mean that most of the inhabitants live in extreme poverty. The main economic activities are cattle raising (14,000 head in 2006) and farming with modest production of sugarcane, beans, sorghum, tomatoes, mamona, and corn. In 2006 there were 861 rural producers in a total area of 16,154 hectares. Cropland made up 2,000 hectares. Only one farm had a tractor. In the urban area there were no financial institutions as of 2006. There were 89 automobiles (2007), giving a ratio of about one automobile for every 121 inhabitants. Health care was provided by 3 public health clinics. There were no hospitals.

== Municipal Human Development Index ==
- MHDI: .595 (2000)
- State ranking: 840 out of 853 municipalities as of 2000
- National ranking: 4,760 out of 5,138 municipalities as of 2000
- Life expectancy: 69
- Literacy rate: 56
- Combined primary, secondary and tertiary gross enrolment ratio: .694
- Per capita income (monthly): R$55.62 (For the complete list see Frigoletto)

At last count Brazil had 5,561 municipalities while Minas Gerais still had 853.

The above figures can be compared with those of Poços de Caldas, which had an MHDI of .841, the highest in the state of Minas Gerais. The highest MHDI in the country (2000) was São Caetano do Sul in the state of São Paulo with an MHDI of .919. More up-to-date data from 2004 show that the lowest in that year was Manari in the state of Pernambuco with an MHDI of .467 out of a total of 5504 municipalities in the country as of 2004. At last count Brazil had 5,561 municipalities so this might have changed at the time of this writing.

== Notable people ==
- Artemisa Xakriabá - human rights activist

== See also ==
- List of municipalities in Minas Gerais
