= Jê =

Jê or Gê may refer to:

- Jê languages
- Jê peoples
