= Matias Cardoso =

Coordinates: 14°49′13″S 43°52′38″W

- Municipality
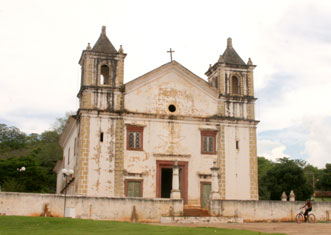

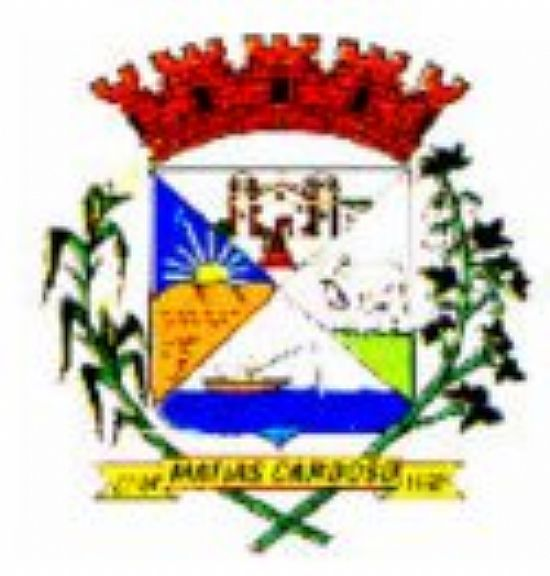
- Coat of arms

- Country: Brazil
- State: Minas Gerais
- Time zone: UTC−3 (BRT)

Matias Cardoso is a municipality in the north of the state of Minas Gerais in Brazil.

== Geography ==
Matias Cardoso is located on the right bank of the São Francisco River. It is 10 km. south of Manga and is 72 km. northwest of Jaíba.

As of 2020 the population was 11,260 in an area of 1,938 km^{2}.

- The elevation of the municipal seat is 472 meters.
- It became a municipality in 1993
- The postal code (CEP) is 39478-000
- Statistical microregion: Januária

The municipality contains the 6,358 hectares (15,710 acres) Jaíba Biological Reserve, a fully protected conservation unit created in 1994.

== Economy ==
The economy is based on agriculture with emphasis on cattle raising. There were 46,000 head in 2006. The main agricultural crops were cotton, peanuts, corn, manioc, sorghum, sugarcane, and mamona—castor oil plant. The GDP was R$37,034,000 in 2005.

== Health ==
This municipality is extremely isolated from major population centers and suffers from drought and poor soils. It is one of the poorest in the state and in the country.

- Municipal Human Development Index: .602 (2000)
- State ranking: 831 out of 853 municipalities as of 2000
- National ranking: 4,618 out of 5,138 municipalities as of 2000

(For the complete list see Frigoletto)

- Illiteracy rate: 32.51% (older than 16) – the rate for the state was 11.96% (2000)
- Infant mortality rate: 12.20 – the rate for the state was 17.40 (2000)
- Urbanization rate: 43% – the rate for the state was 80% (2000)
- Urban area connected to sewers: 2.4% – the state percentage was 81.39% (2000)
- Urban area with garbage collection: 34.06% – the state percentage was 91.37 (2000)
- Health clinics: 4

== Festivity ==
Since 2011 in the municipality it is celebrated annually on December 8 (day of the Catholic liturgical feast Immaculate Conception of Our Lady) the Day of the Gerais. Matias Cardoso was founded by the bandeirantes of São Paulo Januário Almeida and his son, Matias Cardoso de Almeida. The date was the initiative of state representative Paulo Guedes (not the minister). The date was chosen because it is the day of the patron saint of the municipal parish church, built in 1664.

Inhabitants of the region are called geraizeiros.

== See also ==
- List of municipalities in Minas Gerais
