= Peruaçu River =

Coordinates: 15°11′S 44°07′W

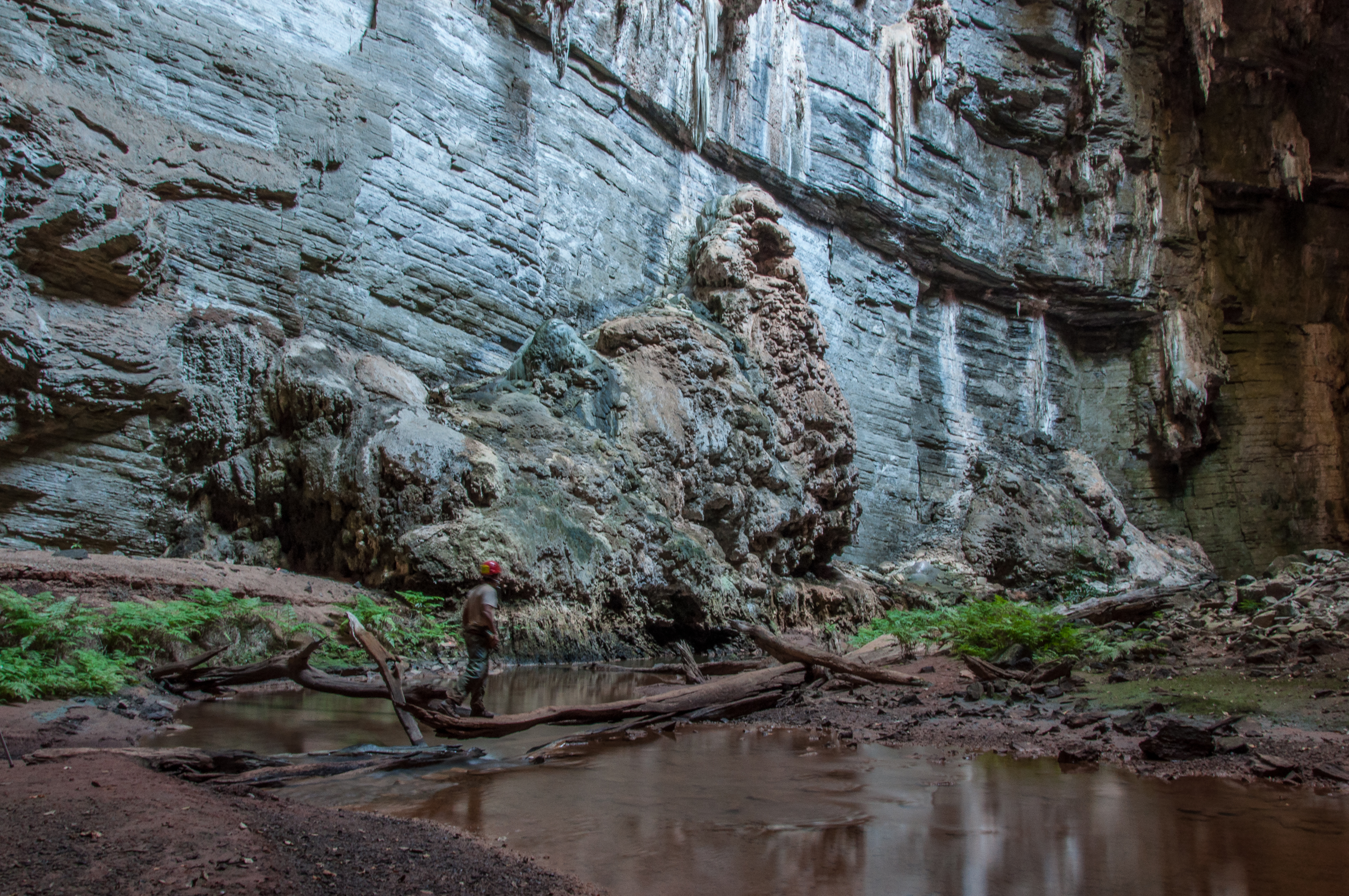
- River crossing in Gruta do Janelão

Location
- Country: Brazil

Physical characteristics
- Source
  - location: Minas Gerais state

The Peruaçu River is a river of Minas Gerais state in southeastern Brazil.

== See also ==
- List of rivers of Minas Gerais
