= Montalvânia =

- Municipality
- The Municipality of Montalvânia
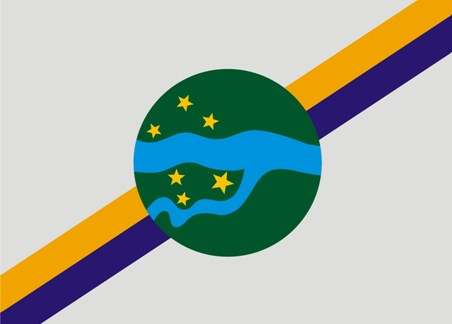
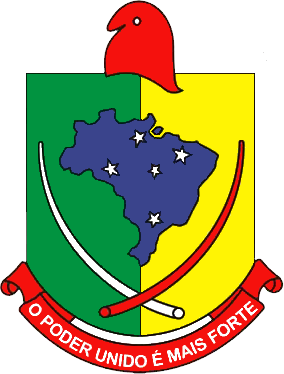
- Flag Coat of arms

- Location in Brazil
- Coordinates: 14°25′03″S 44°22′13″W
- Country: Brazil
- Region: Southeast
- State: Minas Gerais
- Mesoregion: North of Minas Gerais
- Microregion: Januária
- Founded: April 22, 1962

Government
  - Mayor: José Florisval de Ornelas

Area
  - Total: 1,484.388 km^{2} (573.125 sq mi)

Population (2020)
  - Total: 14,747
  - Density: 11.6/km^{2} (30/sq mi)
- Time zone: UTC−3 (BRT)
- HDI (2000): 0.645 – medium (760th in Minas Gerais, 3,854th in Brazil)
- Website: www.montalvania.mg.gov.br/

Montalvânia is a municipality in the northernmost point of the state of Minas Gerais in Brazil. As of 2020 the population was 14,747 in an area of 1,484.388 km^{2}. The elevation of the municipal seat is 510 meters, the postal code (CEP) is 39495-000 and it is located in the microregion of Januária

== Economy ==
The economy is based on agriculture with emphasis on cattle raising. There were 41,000 head in 2006. The main agricultural crops were corn, manioc, sugarcane, and rice. The GDP was R$47,000,000 in 2005.

=== Quality of life ===
- Illiteracy rate: 29.51% (older than 16)--the rate for the state was 11.96% (2000)
- Infant mortality rate: 34.48—the rate for the state was 17.40
- Urbanization rate: 52%--the rate for the state was 80% (2000)

== Transportation ==
The main highways of access are BR-135 and BR-030. The Cavernas do Peruaçu National Park lies to the south near Itacarambi. The boundary with the state of Bahia lies to the north. The municipal seat is 64 km. south of the São Francisco River.

The streets are named after philosophers and thinkers like Buddha, Confucious, Homer, Plato, and Mohamed. The founder of the town was Antônio Montalvão (1917–1992), a local rancher who donated the land to build lots. He believed that extraterrestrials had used the region as a base to capture energy for their space travels. According to him inscriptions on rocks refer to space ships and rituals practiced between extraterrestrials and humans.

== See also ==
- List of municipalities in Minas Gerais
