= São Francisco, Minas Gerais =

City in Minas Gerais, Brazil

Coordinates: 15°57′15″S 44°51′43″W

- Municipality
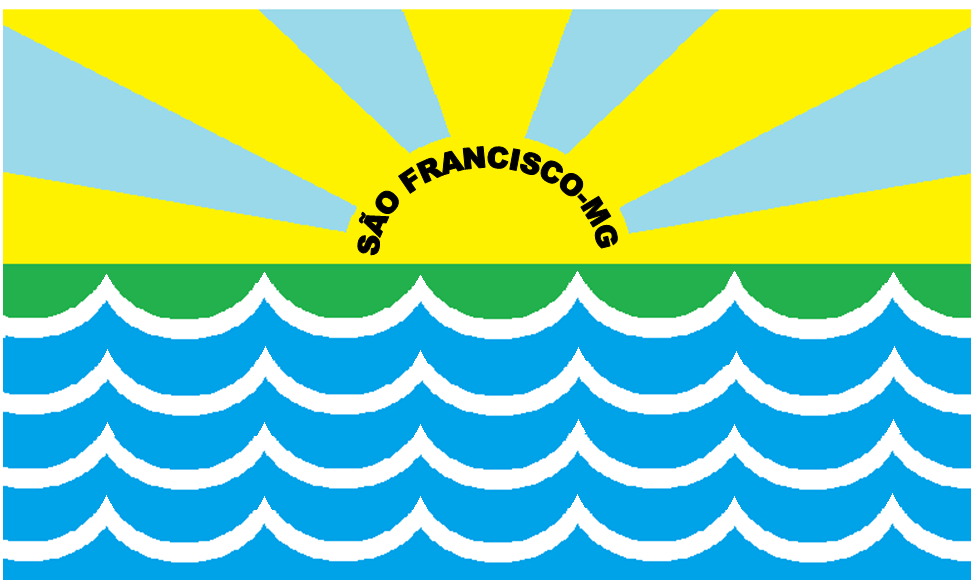
- Flag
- Interactive map of São Francisco, Minas Gerais
- Country: Brazil
- State: Minas Gerais
- Region: Southeast
- Time zone: UTC−3 (BRT)

Location of São Francisco in the state of Minas Gerais

São Francisco is a municipality in the north of the state of Minas Gerais in Brazil. As of 2020 the population was 56,477 in an area of 3,300 km^{2} (1,300 sq mi). The elevation of the municipal seat is 695 meters. It became a municipality in 1831. The postal code (CEP) is 39300-000 and it belongs to the statistical microregion of Januária.

São Francisco is located on the right bank of the São Francisco River. It is connected by paved road to Brasília de Minas and to Montes Claros.

The economy is based on agriculture with emphasis on cattle raising. There were 103,000 head in 2006. The main agricultural crops were sugarcane, bananas, castor oil seeds, and corn. The GDP was R$140,741,000 in 2005. Irrigation from the São Francisco River allows for production of tropical fruits. In 2006 there were 12,500 people connected to agriculture among whom were 2,200 salaried workers. There were 2 banking agencies.

This municipality is isolated from major population centers and suffers from drought and poor soils. Some municipality indexes are:

- Municipal Human Development Index: .680 (2000)
- State ranking: 637 out of 853 municipalities as of 2000
- National ranking: 3,300 out of 5,138 municipalities as of 2000
- Health clinics and hospitals: 10 basic clinics, 15 health centers, and 1 hospital with 24 beds
- Life expectancy: 69.2

The social and health indicators were: degree of urbanization—54.0%; Literacy rate: 77.2; coverage of sewage system in the urban area—1.30%; and infant mortality—20.68.

== See also ==
- List of municipalities in Minas Gerais
