= Norte de Minas (mesoregion) =

- Mesoregion
- Location in Minas Gerais
- Coordinates: 16°44′06″S 43°51′43″W
- Country: Brazil
- Region: Southeast
- State: Minas Gerais

Area
  - Total: 128,454.108 km^{2} (49,596.408 sq mi)

Population (2010/IBGE)
  - Total: 1,614,971
- Time zone: UTC-3 (BRT)
  - Summer (DST): UTC-2 (BRST)
- Area code: +55 38

Norte de Minas (English: Northern Minas) is one of the twelve mesoregions of the Brazilian state of Minas Gerais. It is composed of 89 municipalities, distributed across 7 microregions.
