= Itacarambi =

Human settlement in Brazil

Coordinates: 15°06′06″S 44°06′24″W

- Municipality
- Coat of arms
- Interactive map of Itacarambi
- Country: Brazil
- State: Minas Gerais
- Region: Southeast
- Time zone: UTC−3 (BRT)

Location of Itacarambi in the state of Minas Gerais

Itacarambi is a municipality in the north of the state of Minas Gerais in Brazil. As of 2020 the population was 18,164 in an area of 1,252 km^{2}.

- The elevation of the municipal seat is 445 meters.
- It became a municipality in 1962.
- The postal code (CEP) is 39470–000.
- Statistical microregion: Januária

Icaraí de Minas is on the left bank of the São Francisco River between Januária and Manga. It is connected to Januária by paved BR-135. The distance is 63 km.

The economy is based on agriculture with emphasis on cattle raising. There were 39,000 head in 2006. The main agricultural crops were corn, manioc, sugarcane, and mamona—castor oil plant. The GDP was R$65,000,000 in 2005.

- Municipal Human Development Index: .622 (2000)
- State ranking: 801 out of 853 municipalities as of 2000
- National ranking: 4,267 out of 5,138 municipalities as of 2000

(For the complete list see Frigoletto)

== Climate ==
Climate data for Jaíba (Mocambinho) (1981–2010)
Month	Jan	Feb	Mar	Apr	May	Jun	Jul	Aug	Sep	Oct	Nov	Dec	Year
Mean daily maximum °C (°F)	32.2 (90.0)	33.0 (91.4)	32.3 (90.1)	32.3 (90.1)	31.7 (89.1)	30.8 (87.4)	30.7 (87.3)	32.1 (89.8)	33.8 (92.8)	34.4 (93.9)	32.4 (90.3)	31.8 (89.2)	32.3 (90.1)
Daily mean °C (°F)	25.6 (78.1)	25.8 (78.4)	25.5 (77.9)	25.0 (77.0)	23.7 (74.7)	22.3 (72.1)	21.9 (71.4)	23.1 (73.6)	25.2 (77.4)	26.6 (79.9)	25.8 (78.4)	25.4 (77.7)	24.7 (76.5)
Mean daily minimum °C (°F)	20.8 (69.4)	20.6 (69.1)	20.5 (68.9)	19.6 (67.3)	17.4 (63.3)	15.3 (59.5)	14.6 (58.3)	15.1 (59.2)	17.6 (63.7)	20.1 (68.2)	20.8 (69.4)	20.9 (69.6)	18.6 (65.5)
Average precipitation mm (inches)	149.5 (5.89)	95.0 (3.74)	112.0 (4.41)	54.4 (2.14)	7.9 (0.31)	1.7 (0.07)	0.8 (0.03)	1.3 (0.05)	6.7 (0.26)	58.4 (2.30)	153.7 (6.05)	192.8 (7.59)	834.2 (32.84)
Average precipitation days (≥ 1.0 mm)	9	7	9	4	1	0	0	0	1	5	10	12	58
Average relative humidity (%)	75.9	73.4	75.7	72.3	67.3	63.7	61.2	55.5	53.0	57.7	72.0	77.6	67.1
Mean monthly sunshine hours	231.7	233.7	232.2	252.9	269.6	268.6	280.2	290.2	265.7	232.1	184.1	183.5	2,924.5
Source: Instituto Nacional de Meteorologia

== See also ==
- List of municipalities in Minas Gerais
