= Francisco Dumont =

Human settlement in Brazil

Coordinates: 17°18′54″S 44°14′02″W

- Municipality
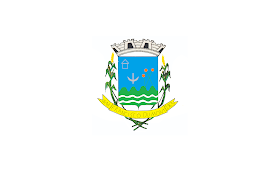
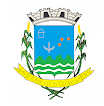
- Flag Coat of arms
- Interactive map of Francisco Dumont
- Country: Brazil
- State: Minas Gerais
- Region: Southeast
- Time zone: UTC−3 (BRT)

Location of Francisco Dumont in the state of Minas Gerais

Francisco Dumont is a Brazilian municipality located in the north of the state of Minas Gerais. Its population as of 2020 was 5,242 people living in a total area of 1,553 km^{2} (600 sq mi). The city belongs to the mesoregion of North of Minas and to the microregion of Bocaiúva. It became a municipality in 1962.

Francisco Dumont is located at an elevation of 637 meters in the valley of the Rio Jequitaí, a tributary of the São Francisco River. It is southwest of the regional center Montes Claros. The distance to Bocaiúva is 58 km; the distance to Montes Claros is 108 km; and the distance to Belo Horizonte is 376 km. Neighboring municipalities are: Claro dos Poções (N); Joaquim Felício and Engenheiro Navarro (E); Lassance (S); Várzea da Palma and Jequitaí (W).

The main economic activities are cattle raising, services, and agriculture. The GDP in 2005 was R$15 million, with 9 million from services, 1 million from industry, and 4 million from agriculture. There were 268 rural producers on 165,000 hectares of land. Only 30 farms had tractors. The main crops were oranges, sugarcane, beans, and corn. There were 24,000 head of cattle (2006).

Francisco Dumont suffers from periodic drought and poor highway communications. Its social indicators rank it in the bottom tier of municipalities in the state.

- Municipal Human Development Index: 0.656 (2000)
- State ranking: 725 out of 853 municipalities as of 2000
- National ranking: 3,670 out of 5,138 municipalities as of 2000
- Literacy rate: 76%
- Life expectancy: 65 (average of males and females)

The highest ranking municipality in Minas Gerais in 2000 was Poços de Caldas with 0.841, while the lowest was Setubinha with 0.568. Nationally the highest was São Caetano do Sul in São Paulo with 0.919, while the lowest was Setubinha. In more recent statistics (considering 5,507 municipalities) Manari in the state of Pernambuco has the lowest rating in the country—0,467—putting it in last place.

== See also ==
- List of municipalities in Minas Gerais
