= Juramento =

Municipality in Minas Gerais, Brazil

Coordinates: 16°50′49″S 43°34′15″W

- Municipality
- Interactive map of Juramento
- Country: Brazil
- State: Minas Gerais
- Region: Southeast
- Time zone: UTC−3 (BRT)

Location of Juramento in the state of Minas Gerais

Juramento is a municipality in the north of the Brazilian state of Minas Gerais. As of 2020 the population was 4,345 in a total area of 432 km^{2}. It became a municipality in 1953.

Juramento is located 42 km to the southeast of Montes Claros on BR-308 at an elevation of 682 meters. It belongs to the statistical microregion of Montes Claros. Neighboring municipalities are Francisco Sá, Montes Claros, Glaucilândia, and Botumirim.

== Economic activities ==
The most important economic activities are cattle raising, commerce, and subsistence agriculture. The GDP in 2005 was R$16,756,000. Juramento is in the bottom tier of municipalities in the state with regard to economic and social development. It suffers from isolation, poor soils, and periodic drought. As of 2007 there were no banking agencies in the town. There was a small retail commerce serving the surrounding area of cattle and agricultural lands. In the rural area there were 310 establishments employing about 800 workers. Only 29 of the farms had tractors. There were 57 automobiles in all of the municipality. There were 25,500 head of cattle in 2006. The crops with a planted area of more than 100 hectares were beans, sugarcane and corn.

== Health and education ==
- Municipal Human Development Index: 0.680 (2000)
- State ranking: 635 out of 853 municipalities as of 2000
- National ranking: 3,292 out of 5,138 municipalities as of 2000
- Literacy rate: 79%
- Life expectancy: 67 (average of males and females)
- Urbanization rate: 48.01 (2000)
- Percentage of urban houses served by sewage system: 22.90
- Infant mortality rate: 19.23

The highest ranking municipality in Minas Gerais in 2000 was Poços de Caldas with 0.841, while the lowest was Setubinha with 0.568. Nationally the highest was São Caetano do Sul in São Paulo state with 0.919, while the lowest was Setubinha.

In the health sector there were 5 clinics and one hospital with 18 beds. In the educational sector there were 4 primary schools and 2 middle schools.

== Climate ==
Climate data for Juramento (1991–2020)
| Month | Jan | Feb | Mar | Apr | May | Jun | Jul | Aug | Sep | Oct | Nov | Dec | Year |
|---|---|---|---|---|---|---|---|---|---|---|---|---|---|
| Mean daily maximum °C (°F) | 30.3 (86.5) | 30.7 (87.3) | 30.4 (86.7) | 30.0 (86.0) | 29.0 (84.2) | 28.1 (82.6) | 28.0 (82.4) | 29.3 (84.7) | 31.2 (88.2) | 32.1 (89.8) | 30.2 (86.4) | 29.8 (85.6) | 29.9 (85.8) |
| Mean daily minimum °C (°F) | 18.8 (65.8) | 18.7 (65.7) | 18.8 (65.8) | 17.3 (63.1) | 15.0 (59.0) | 13.2 (55.8) | 12.3 (54.1) | 13.5 (56.3) | 16.0 (60.8) | 18.3 (64.9) | 19.1 (66.4) | 19.1 (66.4) | 16.7 (62.1) |
| Average precipitation mm (inches) | 158.9 (6.26) | 101 (4.0) | 117.7 (4.63) | 38.7 (1.52) | 11.3 (0.44) | 4.0 (0.16) | 0.7 (0.03) | 1.4 (0.06) | 16.2 (0.64) | 69.7 (2.74) | 183.1 (7.21) | 215.6 (8.49) | 918.3 (36.15) |
| Average precipitation days (≥ 1.0 mm) | 10 | 7 | 8 | 4 | 1 | 1 | 0 | 0 | 1 | 5 | 12 | 13 | 62 |
| Average relative humidity (%) | 76.2 | 75.3 | 78.4 | 77.2 | 74.0 | 71.2 | 67.2 | 61.1 | 57.6 | 60.3 | 73.1 | 77.7 | 70.8 |
| Mean monthly sunshine hours | 212.0 | 210.3 | 212.6 | 226.1 | 244.7 | 243.0 | 258.4 | 275.2 | 247.6 | 233.3 | 167.9 | 172.1 | 2,703.2 |
Source: Instituto Nacional de Meteorologia

== See also ==
- List of municipalities in Minas Gerais
