= Engenheiro Navarro =

Brazilian municipality

Coordinates: 17°16′48″S 43°57′00″W

- Municipality
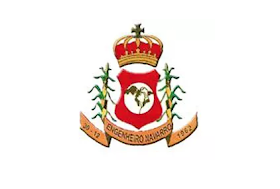
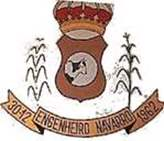
- Flag Coat of arms
- Interactive map of Engenheiro Navarro
- Country: Brazil
- State: Minas Gerais
- Region: Southeast
- Time zone: UTC−3 (BRT)

Location of Engenheiro Navarro in the state of Minas Gerais

Engenheiro Navarro is a Brazilian municipality located in the north of the state of Minas Gerais. Its population as of 2020 was 7,241 people living in a total area of 632 km^{2}. The city belongs to the mesoregion of North of Minas and to the microregion of Bocaiúva. It became a municipality in 1962.

Engenheiro Navarro is located at an elevation 637 meters on the railroad line that links Belo Horizonte to Montes Claros. This line is no longer used for passenger traffic. Highway BR-135, which links Montes Claros to the state boundary with Goiás passes at a distance of 4 kilometers to the east. The distance to Bocaiúva is 35 km; the distance to Montes Claros is 85 km; and the distance to Belo Horizonte is 347 km. Neighboring municipalities are: Bocaiúva (N) and (E); Joaquim Felício (S); Francisco Dumont and Claro dos Poções (W).

The main economic activities are cattle raising, services, and agriculture. The GDP in 2005 was R$23 million, with 14 million in services, 2 million in industry, and 5 million in agriculture. There were 268 rural producers on 40,000 hectares of land. The main crops were cotton, sugarcane, beans, and corn. There were 27,000 head of cattle (2006).

- Municipal Human Development Index: 0.686 (2000)
- State ranking: 606 out of 853 municipalities as of 2000
- National ranking: 3,220 out of 5,138 municipalities as of 2000
- Literacy rate: 73%
- Life expectancy: 72 (average of males and females)
- Degree of urbanization: 66.53% (2000)
- Percentage of urban houses with sewage connections: 1.70%

The highest ranking municipality in Minas Gerais in 2000 was Poços de Caldas with 0.841, while the lowest was Setubinha with 0.568. Nationally the highest was São Caetano do Sul in São Paulo with 0.919, while the lowest was Setubinha. In more recent statistics (considering 5,507 municipalities) Manari in the state of Pernambuco has the lowest rating in the country—0,467—putting it in last place.

== See also ==
- List of municipalities in Minas Gerais
