= Olhos-d'Água =

Human settlement in Brazil

Coordinates: 17°23′52″S 43°34′22″W

- Municipality
- Interactive map of Olhos-d'Água
- Country: Brazil
- State: Minas Gerais
- Region: Southeast
- Time zone: UTC−3 (BRT)

Location of Olhos-d'Água within Minas Gerais

Olhos-d'Água is a Brazilian municipality located in the north of the state of Minas Gerais. Its population as of 2020 was 6,171 people living in a total area of 2,086 km^{2}. The city belongs to the mesoregion of North of Minas and to the microregion of Bocaiúva. It became a municipality in 1997.

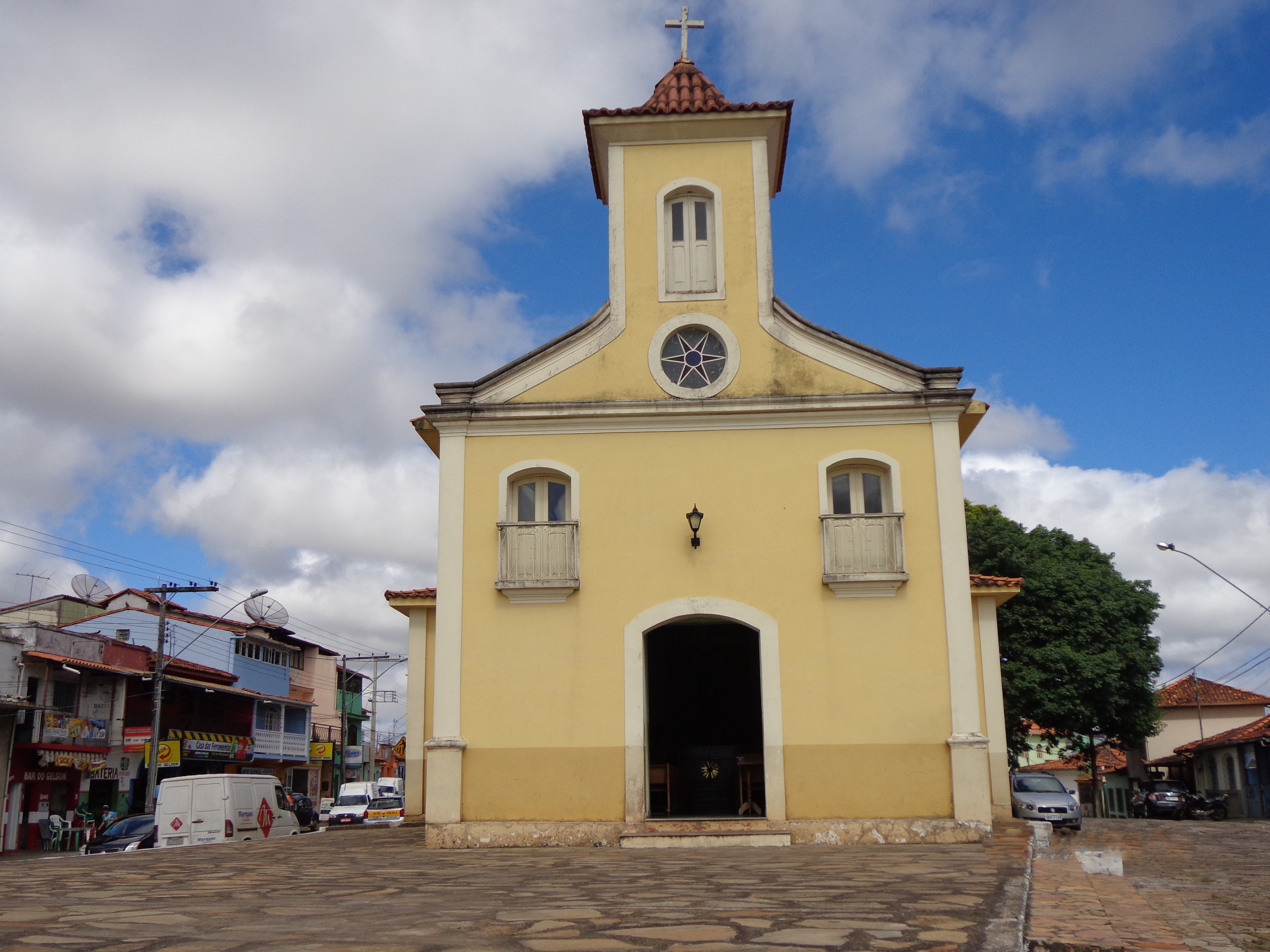
Olhos-d'Água (2013)

Olhos-d'Água is located at an elevation of 759 meters in the valley of the Rio Tabatinga, a tributary of the Jequitinhonha River. It is southeast of the regional center Montes Claros. The distance to Bocaiúva is 50 km; the distance to Montes Claros is 110 km; and the distance to Belo Horizonte is 414 km. Neighboring municipalities are: Bocaiúva (N) and (W); Diamantina (S) and (E).

The main economic activities are cattle raising, services, and agriculture. The GDP in 2005 was R$18 million, with 10 million from services, 2 million from industry, and 5 million from agriculture. There were 383 rural producers on 32,000 hectares of land. Only 15 farms had tractors. The main crops were mangoes, sugarcane, beans, and corn. There were 10,000 head of cattle (2006).

Olhos-d'Água suffers from periodic drought, poor soils, and poor highway communications. Its social indicators rank it in the bottom tier of municipalities in the state.

- Municipal Human Development Index: 0.669 (2000)
- State ranking: 677 out of 853 municipalities as of 2000
- National ranking: 3,477 out of 5,138 municipalities as of 2000
- Literacy rate: 72%
- Life expectancy: 72 (average of males and females)

The highest ranking municipality in Minas Gerais in 2000 was Poços de Caldas with 0.841, while the lowest was Setubinha with 0.568. Nationally the highest was São Caetano do Sul in São Paulo with 0.919, while the lowest was Setubinha. In more recent statistics (considering 5,507 municipalities) Manari in the state of Pernambuco has the lowest rating in the country—0.467—putting it in last place.

== See also ==
- List of municipalities in Minas Gerais
