= Joaquim Felício =

Human settlement in Brazil

Coordinates: 17°46′S 44°09′W

- Municipality
- Interactive map of Joaquim Felício
- Country: Brazil
- State: Minas Gerais
- Region: Southeast
- Time zone: UTC−3 (BRT)

Location of Joaquim Felício in the state of Minas Gerais

Joaquim Felício is a Brazilian municipality located in the northeast of the state of Minas Gerais. Its population as of 2020 was 4,727 living in a total area of 791 km^{2}. The city belongs to the statistical mesoregion of Central Mineira and to the statistical microregion of Curvelo. It became a municipality in 1962.

== Geography ==
Joaquim Felício is located at an elevation of 630 meters on highway BR-135. The nearest major population center is Montes Claros. The settlement began with the arrival of the Estrada de Ferro Central do Brasil in 1921. The first name was Estação de Tabua, later changed to Embaiassaia, the name of a nearby river. In 1928 the name was Joaquim Felício and it was a district of the municipality of Buenópolis. In 1963 it became a municipality with the economic activity of crystal mining.

The distance to Montes Claros is 140 km, Curvelo is 120 km., and the distance to the state capital, Belo Horizonte, is 298 km. Neighboring municipalities are: Bocaiúva, Buenópolis, Engenheiro Navarro, Francisco Dumont and Lassance. The municipality contains part of the 22,494 hectares (55,580 acres) Serra do Cabral State Park, created in 2005.

== Economy ==
The main economic activities are services, small industries, and agriculture. The production of charcoal from eucalyptus plantations is also important. The GDP in 2005 was R$17 million, with 10 million from services, 1 million from industry, and 5 million from agriculture. There were 316 rural producers on 24,000 hectares of land. Only 20 farms had tractors (2006). Approximately 750 persons were dependent on agriculture. The main crops were sugarcane, beans, and corn. There were 14,000 head of cattle (2006). There was 1 bank (2007) and 224 automobiles (68 motorcycles), giving a ratio of 17 inhabitants per automobile.

== Social indices ==
There was 1 health clinic and 1 hospital with 28 beds in 2005. Patients with more serious health conditions are transported to Montes Claros or Curvelo. Educational needs were met by 2 primary schools, 1 middle school, and 1 pre-primary school.

- Municipal Human Development Index: 0.673 (2000)
- State ranking: 661 out of 853 municipalities as of 2000
- National ranking: 3,405 out of 5,138 municipalities as of 2000
- Literacy rate: 76%
- Life expectancy: 65 (average of males and females)

In 2000 the per capita income of R$130.00 was well below the state and national average of R$276.00 and R$297.00 respectively.

The highest ranking municipality in Minas Gerais in 2000 was Poços de Caldas with 0.841, while the lowest was Setubinha with 0.568. Nationally the highest was São Caetano do Sul in São Paulo with 0.919, while the lowest was Setubinha. In more recent statistics (considering 5,507 municipalities) Manari in the state of Pernambuco has the lowest rating in the country—0,467—putting it in last place.

== See also ==
- List of municipalities in Minas Gerais
