= Guaraciama =

Municipality of Brazil

Coordinates: 17°00′50″S 43°40′22″W

- Municipality
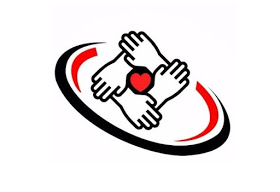
- Flag
- Interactive map of Guaraciama
- Country: Brazil
- State: Minas Gerais
- Region: Southeast
- Time zone: UTC−3 (BRT)

Location of Guaraciama in the state of Minas Gerais

Guaraciama is a Brazilian municipality located in the north of the state of Minas Gerais. Its population as of 2020 was 4,989 people living in a total area of 392 km^{2}. The city belongs to the mesoregion of North of Minas and to the microregion of Bocaiúva. It became a municipality in 1997.

Guaraciama is located at an elevation of 795 meters in the valley of the Rio Verde Grande, a tributary of the São Francisco River. It is southwest of the regional center Montes Claros. The distance to Bocaiúva is 18 km; the distance to Montes Claros is 44 km; and the distance to Belo Horizonte is 399 km. It is surrounded by the municipality of Bocaiúva on three sides. Neighboring municipalities are: Montes Claros (N); Bocaiúva(E) (W) (S).

The main economic activities are cattle raising, services, and agriculture. The GDP in 2005 was R$13 million, with 8 million from services, 1 million from industry, and 3 million from agriculture. There were 330 rural producers on 7,300 hectares of land. Only 08 farms had tractors. The main crops were mangoes, sugarcane, beans, and corn. There were 7,000 head of cattle (2006).

Guaraciama suffers from periodic drought and poor highway communications. Its social indicators rank it in the bottom tier of municipalities in the state.

- Municipal Human Development Index: 0.689 (2000)
- State ranking: 595 out of 853 municipalities as of 2000
- National ranking: 3,172 out of 5,138 municipalities as of 2000
- Literacy rate: 77%
- Life expectancy: 69 (average of males and females)

The highest ranking municipality in Minas Gerais in 2000 was Poços de Caldas with 0.841, while the lowest was Setubinha with 0.568. Nationally the highest was São Caetano do Sul in São Paulo with 0.919, while the lowest was Setubinha. In more recent statistics (considering 5,507 municipalities) Manari in the state of Pernambuco has the lowest rating in the country—0,467—putting it in last place.

== See also ==
- List of municipalities in Minas Gerais
