= Dina Mangabeira =

Brazilian poet and literary critic

- Born: 20 August 1923; Bocaiúva, Minas Gerais, Brazil
- Died: 11 February 2000 (aged 76); Belo Horizonte, Minas Gerais, Brazil
- Occupations: Poet, literary critic, teacher
- Writing career
- Notable works: No Palco Real da Vida (1986), À Sombra do Passado (1990), A Lógica da Minha Saudade (2025, posthumous)
- Notable awards: Santos Dumont Medal (1994)

Dina Mangabeira (20 August 1923 – 11 February 2000) was a Brazilian poet, literary critic, and educator.

She was born in Bocaiúva, in the rural farm of Morro Agudo, into a traditional family from northern Minas Gerais. The name "Mangabeira" was inherited from her paternal grandfather, who extracted and industrialized the latex of the native mangaba fruit in the states of Minas Gerais and Bahia, selling it to rubber factories.

At the age of two, she moved with her family to Montes Claros, where she completed her primary education and graduated as a schoolteacher in 1943. She worked as a teacher at the Instituto Norte Mineiro de Educação between 1945 and 1948. After marrying Ailton Rosa Rezende, a banker, she left the teaching profession to dedicate herself to her family. The couple had four children.

She lived in Montes Claros until the mid-1970s, when her husband was transferred to Belo Horizonte. In the capital, Mangabeira engaged in social and literary activities, particularly with the Confraternity of Christian Mothers. She was an active member of several literary organizations, including:

- the Academia Feminina Mineira de Letras (AFEMIL), occupying chair no. 19;
- the Academia Municipalista de Letras de Minas Gerais (AMULMIG), representing Montes Claros;
- the Academia Montesclarense de Letras;
- the Academia de Ciências e Letras de Conselheiro Lafaiete;
- the União Brasileira de Trovadores (UBT), Belo Horizonte chapter.

Mangabeira wrote poetry, short stories, and chronicles. She began contributing regularly to newspapers in Belo Horizonte and Montes Claros in the early 1980s. In 1986, she published her first book, No Palco Real da Vida, a collection of short stories and chronicles. Her second book, À Sombra do Passado, featuring her poetry, was released in 1990.

In 1994, she received the Santos Dumont Medal from the governor of Minas Gerais, Hélio Garcia, in recognition of her literary contributions.

At the end of the 1990s, Mangabeira was working on her third book. Due to health problems, she was unable to complete the publication before her death in 2000, caused by cancer-related complications.

In 2025, her family published her third and final book posthumously, titled A Lógica da Minha Saudade. The book includes poems and chronicles written in her final years and preserves her original typescripts, as well as a prologue recovered from scattered manuscripts and an epilogue written by her husband, Ailton Rezende.

== Bibliography ==
- No Palco Real da Vida (1986) – short stories and chronicles
- À Sombra do Passado (1990) – poetry
- A Lógica da Minha Saudade (2025, posthumous) – poetry and prose
