= Chichico Alkmim =

Brazilian photographer

Francisco Augusto de Alkmim (March 28, 1886 in Bocaiúva – August 22, 1978 in Diamantina), popularly known as Chichico Alkmim, was a Brazilian photographer active in the city of Diamantina, Minas Gerais from 1907 to 1955.

== Biography ==
Francisco Augusto de Alkmim was born in Bocaiúva to Herculano Augusto d'Alkmim and Luiza Gomes d'Alkmim on March 28, 1886. In 1913, he married Maria Josephina Neta Alkimim, with whom he had 6 children.

He learned photography at the beginning of the 1900s with Father Manuel Gonzales the brothers Passig. In 1910, he moved to Diamantina and set up his first rudimentary studio. In 1920, he built his first professional studio, at his home. The studio was divided into 2 sections: a portrait studio and a photo lab. He primarily used glass negatives emulsified with silver nitrate. His images catalog portray the people of Diamantina and catalog the transformations of the city they inhabited. He retired in 1955, at the age of 69.

== Works ==
His works were exhibited at the Palácio das Artes in Belo Horizonte from November 9, 2019, to February 27, 2020.
