= Jequitaí =

Brazilian municipality located in the north of the state of Minas Gerais

Coordinates: 17°14′09″S 44°26′45″W

- Municipality
- Interactive map of Jequitaí
- Country: Brazil
- State: Minas Gerais
- Region: Southeast
- Time zone: UTC−3 (BRT)

Location of Jequitaí within the state of Minas Gerais

Jequitaí is a Brazilian municipality located in the north of the state of Minas Gerais. In 2020 the population was 7,468 in a total area of 1,268 km^{2}. It became a municipality in 1948.

== Geography ==
Jequitaí is located on the Jequitaí River, a tributary of the São Francisco River at an elevation of 517 meters. It is east of the nearest population center, Pirapora, which lies at a distance of 66 km. Montes Claros is 103 km. to the northeast. Neighboring municipalities are: Pirapora, Claro dos Poções, Coração de Jesus. Jequitaí is part of the statistical microregion of Pirapora.

== Economic activities ==
The most important economic activities are cattle raising (41,000 head in 2006) and agriculture. The GDP in 2005 was R$30,637,000. The most important agricultural crops are bananas, coconuts, rice, sugarcane, beans and corn. There were 314 automobiles. In the rural area there were 514 producers. The total area of agricultural land was 45,000 hectares in 2006, of which 8,500 ha. were planted in crops. As of 2006 there were 99 tractors. In the urban area there was one banking agency in 2006.

== Health and education ==
This municipality is isolated from major population centers and suffers from drought and poor soils.

- Municipal Human Development Index: 0.705 (2000)
- State ranking: 521 out of 853 municipalities as of 2000
- National ranking: 2,903 out of 5,138 municipalities as of 2000

The highest ranking municipality in Minas Gerais in 2000 was Poços de Caldas with 0.841, while the lowest was Setubinha with 0.568. Nationally the highest was São Caetano do Sul in São Paulo with 0.919, while the lowest was Setubinha.

- Degree of urbanization: 68.35% (2000)
- Infant mortality rate: 28.37 (2000) The rate for Minas Gerais was 17.40; the rate for Brazil was 18.91.
- Illiteracy rate: 24.74% (15 years old or older)(Data from 2000) The rate for Minas Gerais was 11.96; the rate for Brazil was 13.63
- Urban area covered by sewage system: 0.20%--the rate for Minas Gerais was 81.39%
- Health centers and hospitals: 05 health centerS. There were no hospitals. The nearest hospital was in Pirapora.

== See also ==
- List of municipalities in Minas Gerais
