= Capitão Enéas =

Human settlement in Brazil

Coordinates: 16°19′04″S 43°42′33″W

- Municipality
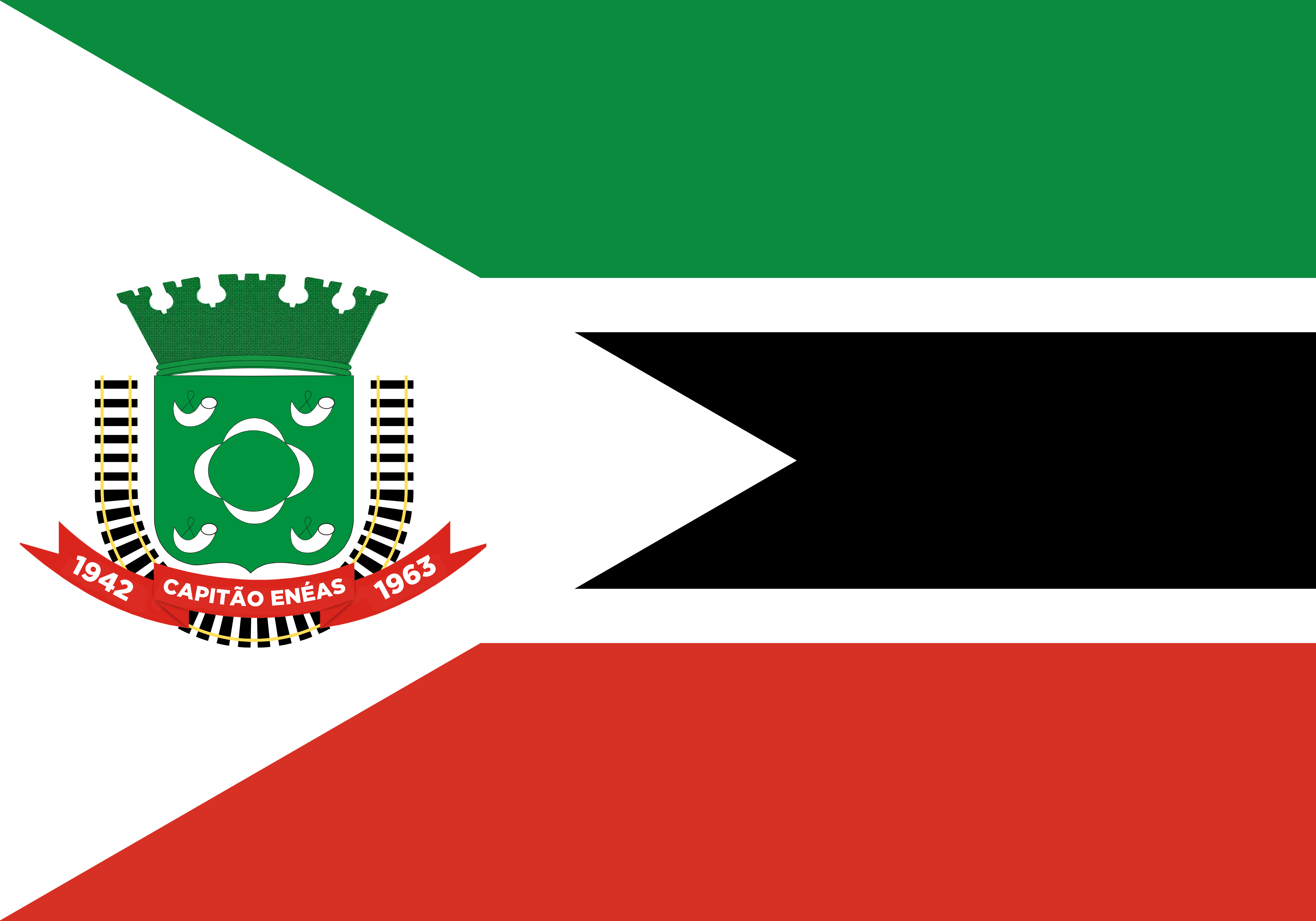
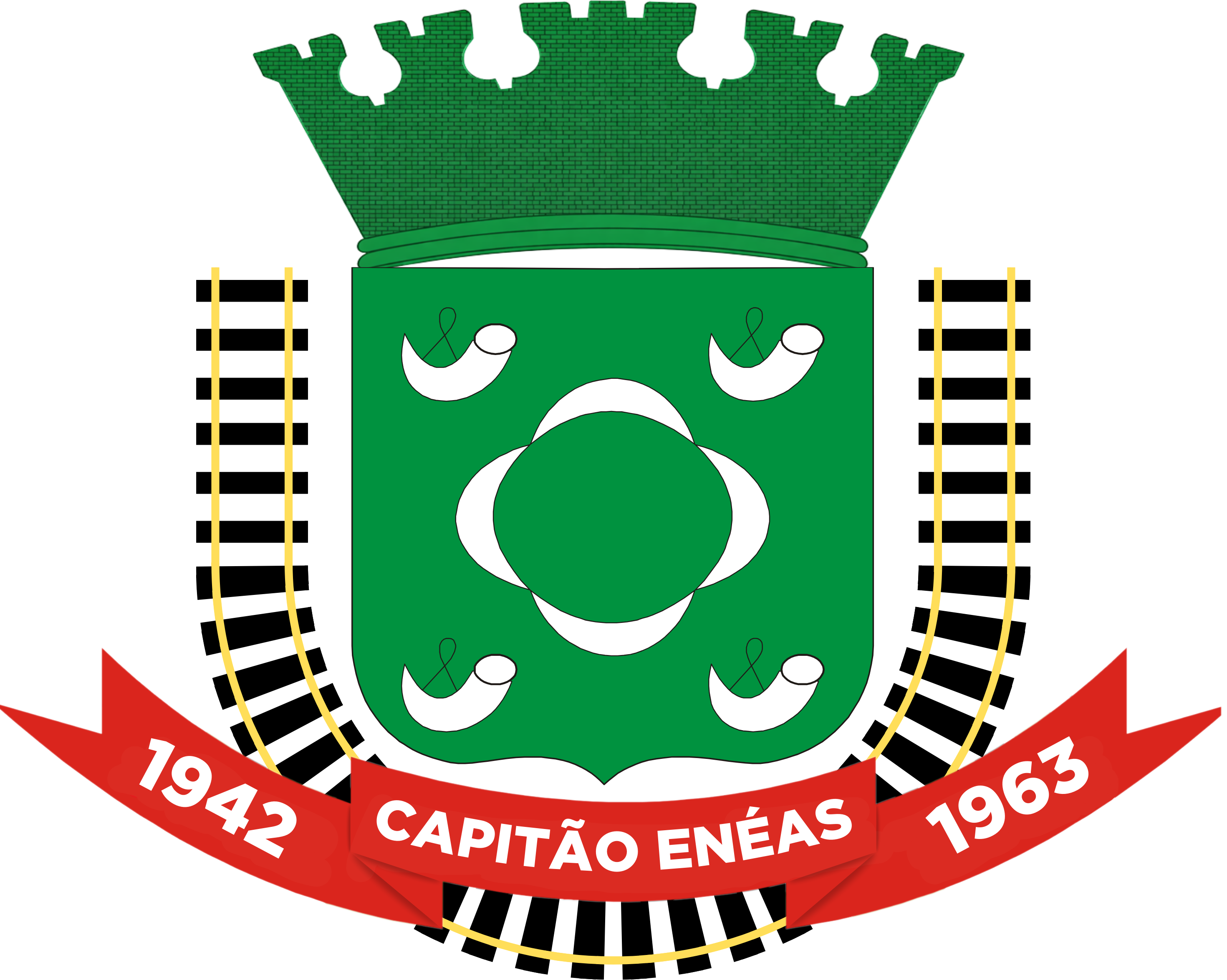
- Flag Coat of arms
- Interactive map of Capitão Enéas
- Country: Brazil
- State: Minas Gerais
- Region: Southeast
- Time zone: UTC−3 (BRT)

Location of Capitão Enéas in the state of Minas Gerais

Capitão Enéas is a municipality in the north of the Brazilian state of Minas Gerais. As of 2020 the population was 15,313 in a total area of 970 km^{2}.

Capitão Enéas belongs to the IBGE statistical microregion of Montes Claros. The distance to this important regional center is 90 km. The municipal seat is located on the railway line that links Minas Gerais to Bahia.

The main economic activity is cattle raising. In 2006 there were 68,000 head of cattle. Important agricultural crops are sugarcane, beans, and corn. There are several small transformation industries. There was 1 financial institution in 2007. In 2007 there were 299 automobiles, giving a ratio of 47 inhabitants for each automobile.

Municipal Human Development Index

- MHDI: .667
- State ranking: 684 out of 853 municipalities
- National ranking: 3,504 out of 5,138 municipalities
- Life expectancy: 67
- Literacy rate: 73 For the complete list see Frigoletto

== See also ==
- List of municipalities in Minas Gerais
