= Bocaiúva =

Town in Brazil

- Municipality of Minas Gerais, Brazil
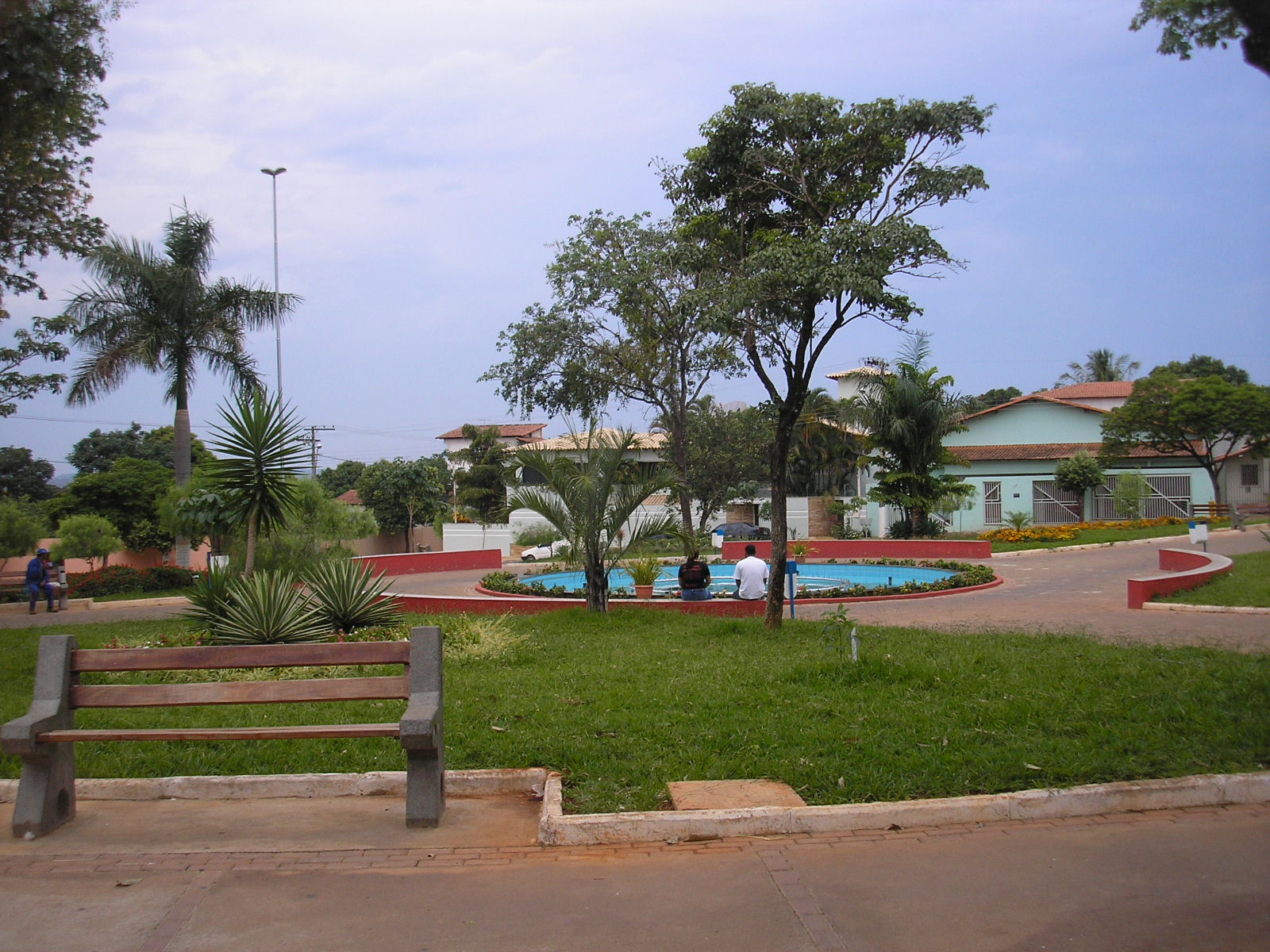
- Plaza in front of the municipal hospital

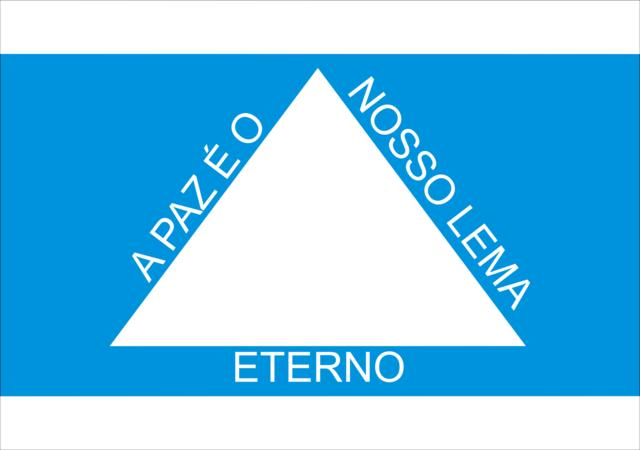
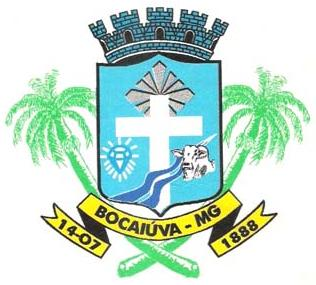
- Flag Coat of arms
- Etymology: Derived either from the indigenous name for the species of palm trees Acrocomia aculeata or from the abolitionist and journalist Quintino Antonio Ferreira de Souza Bocaiúva
- Motto: Portuguese: A paz é o nosso lema eterno English: Peace is our eternal motto
- Location of Bocaiúva in Minas Gerais

- Location within Brazil Location within South America
- Coordinates: 17°06′28″S 43°48′54″W
- Country: Brazil
- Region: Southeast
- State: Minas Gerais
- Founded: 30 October 1884

Government
  - Mayor: Roberto Jairo Torres (Avante) (2025-2028)
  - Vice Mayor: Sonia Maria De Carvalho Guimaraes (REDE) (2025-2028)

Area
  - Total: 3,206.76 km^{2} (1,238.14 sq mi)
- Elevation: 698 m (2,290 ft)

Population (2022)
  - Total: 48,032
  - Density: 14.98/km^{2} (38.8/sq mi)
- Demonym: Bocaiuvense (Brazilian Portuguese)
- Time zone: UTC-03:00 (Brasília Time)
- Postal code: 39390-000, 39393-000, 39394-000, 39395-000
- HDI (2010): 0.700 – high
- Website: bocaiuva.mg.gov.br

Bocaiuva is a Brazilian municipality located in the northwest of the state of Minas Gerais. Its population as of 2020 was 50,256 people living in a total area of 3,232 km^{2}. The city belongs to the mesoregion of North of Minas and to the microregion of Bocaiuva. It became a municipality in 1890.

== Geography ==
=== Location ===
The municipal seat is located at an elevation of 710 meters on the north flank of the Serra do Espinhaço mountain range. Highway connections are made by a feeder road (4 km) to BR-135, which connects to Montes Claros, to the north. Neighboring municipalities are: Montes Claros, Engenheiro Navarro, Glaucilândia, Joaquim Felício, Buenópolis, Diamantina, Olhos-d'Água, Carbonita, Turmalina, Botumirim, Itacambira, Guaraciama and Claro dos Poções

=== Geographical Data ===
- Maximum elevation: 1485 m

Location: Serra do Espinhaço

- Minimum elevation: 597 m

Location: Rio Jequitinhonha / the boundary with the municipalities of Engenheiro Navarro/Joaquim Felício

Temperatura

- Yearly average: 24.3 C
- Maximum average: 30 C
- Minimum average: 16 C
- Yearly rainfall average: 1,246 mm

Relief

- Flat: 58%
- Hilly: 30%
- Mountainous: 12%

Main Rivers

- Rio Guavinipam
- Rio Jequitinhonha

=== Climate ===
Climate data for Bocaiúva (Engenheiro Dolabela) (1981–2010)
Month	Jan	Feb	Mar	Apr	May	Jun	Jul	Aug	Sep	Oct	Nov	Dec	Year
Mean daily maximum °C (°F)	30.7 (87.3)	31.5 (88.7)	31.0 (87.8)	29.8 (85.6)	28.6 (83.5)	27.9 (82.2)	27.4 (81.3)	29.1 (84.4)	30.8 (87.4)	31.6 (88.9)	30.4 (86.7)	29.7 (85.5)	29.9 (85.8)
Mean daily minimum °C (°F)	18.2 (64.8)	18.6 (65.5)	18.6 (65.5)	16.5 (61.7)	14.0 (57.2)	11.5 (52.7)	11.7 (53.1)	12.4 (54.3)	15.7 (60.3)	17.7 (63.9)	18.1 (64.6)	18.2 (64.8)	15.9 (60.6)
Average precipitation mm (inches)	214.6 (8.45)	76.2 (3.00)	117.3 (4.62)	43.7 (1.72)	5.9 (0.23)	7.3 (0.29)	9.6 (0.38)	2.9 (0.11)	23.9 (0.94)	57.6 (2.27)	176.8 (6.96)	206.5 (8.13)	942.3 (37.10)
Average relative humidity (%)	78.0	73.9	76.8	75.1	73.1	70.8	67.1	64.7	65.0	67.4	72.8	78.0	71.9
Mean monthly sunshine hours	187.1	221.3	204.7	223.2	229.8	238.9	242.7	239.7	215.0	195.6	162.9	151.7	2,512.6
Source: Instituto Nacional de Meteorologia

=== Statistical Micro-region ===
Bocaiuva is also a statistical micro-region composed of 5 municipalities: Bocaiuva, Engenheiro Navarro, Francisco Dumont, Guaraciama, and Olhos-d'Água. In 2000 the area was 7,812.30 km^{2}; the population was 60,450; the population density was 7.74 inhabitants/km^{2}.

=== Distances ===
- Montes Claros: 30 km
- Pirapora: 107 km
- Belo Horizonte: 369 km

== Origin of the name ==
There are two versions of the origin of the name "Bocaiuva, either from the Macaúba palm or the abolitionist and journalist Quintino Bocaiuva. According to popular tradition, everything began with the carrying of an image of Our Lord of Bonfim who became too heavy and a chapel was built at that spot. The first name of the settlement was Curato de Macaúbas, then Arraial do Senhor do Bonfim, then, Freguesia do Senhor do Bonfim, Vila do Jequitaí, Vila Nova do Jequitaí and, finally, Bocaiuva.

== Economic activities ==
The most important economic activities are cattle raising for meat and dairy, industry, commerce, and agriculture, with the main crops being corn, and rice. The GDP in 2005 was R$246 million, with 120 million generated by services, 81 million generated by industry, and 22 million generated by agriculture. Bocaiuva is in the middle tier of municipalities in the state with regard to economic and social development. As of 2007 there were 4 banking agencies in the town. There was a modest retail infrastructure serving the surrounding area of cattle and agricultural lands. There were 3,221 automobiles in all of the municipality (2007), about one for every 14 inhabitants.

In the rural area there were 988 establishments (2006) occupying 56,000 hectares (planted area: 6,000 ha). About 2,800 persons were dependent on agriculture. 190 of the farms had tractors, a ratio of one in 05 farms. There were 70,000 head of cattle in 2006. The main crops were bananas, pineapple, cotton, sugarcane, corn, beans, and sorghum.

== Health and education ==
In the health sector there were 20 public health clinics and 13 private health clinics. There was 01 hospital with 60 beds. In the educational sector there were 17 pre-primary schools, 40 primary schools, and 06 middle schools. There is a campus of the Universidade Presidente Antônio Carlos (UNIPAC) with classes in education.

- Municipal Human Development Index: 0.737 (2000)
- State ranking: 371 out of 853 municipalities as of 2000
- National ranking: 2,252 out of 5,138 municipalities as of 2000
- Literacy rate: 82%
- Life expectancy: 73 (average of males and females)
- Urbanization: 75.80% (2000)
- Urban area covered by sewage connections: 69.90%
- Infant mortality: 14.35 in 1,000 live births

The highest ranking municipality in Minas Gerais in 2000 was Poços de Caldas with 0.841, while the lowest was Setubinha with 0.568. Nationally the highest was São Caetano do Sul in São Paulo with 0.919, while the lowest was Setubinha. In more recent statistics (considering 5,507 municipalities) Manari in the state of Pernambuco has the lowest rating in the country—0.467—putting it in last place.

== Notable people ==
- Dina Mangabeira (1923-2000) - poet and literary critic

== See also ==
- List of municipalities in Minas Gerais
