= Yara Tupynambá =

Brazilian artist

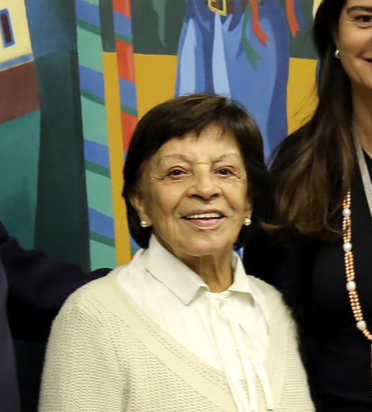
Image of Yara

Yara Tupynambá Gordilho Santos (born April 2, 1932, in Montes Claros, Brazil) is a Brazilian visual artist.

Tupynambá began her career studying under the Brazilian artists Alberto Guignard and Oswaldo Goeldi. Later in life, her studies brought her to the Pratt Institute in New York City.

Her works are well known in Brazil, entitling her to a Sala Especial (Special Room) at São Paulo Art Biennial.

She was also a fine arts professor at UFMG, one of Brazil's main universities, where she helped create the Fine Arts Institute. She has also been a professor at Escola Guignard, a well known fine arts College in Belo Horizonte.

One of her best known works is the panel depicting Adam and Eve naked, situated at the main church in Ferros, Minas Gerais. This panel was described in the novel Hilda Furacão by Roberto Drummond, which later became a TV series. The State of Minas Gerais Legislative Assembly also displays her panel Minas, do século XVII ao século XX.

Tupynambá exhibits her works in all the main arts salons in Brazil: Rio de Janeiro, Belo Horizonte, São Paulo, Brasília, Paraná, Porto Alegre, Campinas, Ouro Preto and Pernambuco. In 1974 she organized the Atelier Vivo (Live Atelier) at São Paulo's famous Art Biennial.
