= Francisco Sá, Minas Gerais =

Municipality in the north of the Brazilian state of Minas Gerais

Coordinates: 16°28′44″S 43°29′41″W

- Municipality
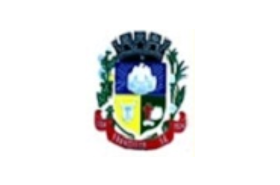
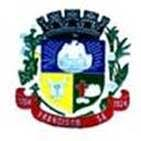
- Flag Coat of arms
- Interactive map of Francisco Sá, Minas Gerais
- Country: Brazil
- State: Minas Gerais
- Region: Southeast
- Time zone: UTC−3 (BRT)

Location of Francisco Sá in the state of Minas Gerais

Francisco Sá is a municipality in the north of the Brazilian state of Minas Gerais. As of 2020 the population was 26,369 in a total area of 2,749 km^{2} (1,061 sq mi). The elevation is 664 meters above sea level.

Francisco Sá is located 51 km northeast of regional center Montes Claros and is on highway BR-251. It is part of the IBGE statistical microregion of Montes Claros.

The main economic activity is cattle raising with 150,720 head counted in 2006. There were 1,497 rural producers with an agricultural area of 168,645 hectares, of which 100,900 hectares were in natural pasture. Other crops grown were corn, beans, manioc, bananas, and tropical fruits. The Gross Domestic Product was R$97,906,000 (2005). There were 2 banking agencies (2006). Health needs were taken care of by 13 health clinics. As of 2006 there was no hospital. The nearest hospital was in Montes Claros.

Municipal Human Development Index

- MHDI: .662
- State ranking: 701 out of 853 municipalities
- National ranking: 3,570 out of 5,138 municipalities
- Life expectancy: 69
- Literacy rate: 72

== See also ==
- List of municipalities in Minas Gerais
