= Claro dos Poções =

Municipality in the Minas Gerais, Brazil

Coordinates: 17°04′48″S 44°12′32″W

- Municipality
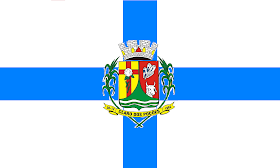
- Flag
- Interactive map of Claro dos Poções
- Country: Brazil
- State: Minas Gerais
- Region: Southeast
- Time zone: UTC−3 (BRT)

Location of Claro dos Poções within the state of Minas Gerais

Claro dos Poções is a Brazilian municipality located in the north of the state of Minas Gerais. In 2020 the population was 7,514 in a total area of 706 km^{2} (273 sq mi). It became a municipality in 1962.

== Geography ==
Claro dos Poções is located east of the São Francisco River, about halfway between Pirapora and Montes Claros. It is 116 km. from Pirapora and 78 km. from Montes Claros. It is 18 km. from federal highway BR-365, linked by a paved road. The elevation of the municipal seat is 650 meters. The distance to Belo Horizonte is 462 km. Neighboring municipalities are: Montes Claros, Jequitaí, Francisco Dumont, and Bocaiúva. Claro dos Poções is part of the statistical microregion of Montes Claros.

=== Geographical data ===
- Highest point: 1012 meters, at the source of Córrego Lajinha
- Lowest point: 575 meters, at the junction of the Rio São Lamberto with the Rio Jequitaí
- Elevation of the center of the town: 650 m
- Average annual temperature: 22.4 °C
- Average annual maximum temperature: 29.3 °C
- Average annual minimum temperature: 16.7 °C
- Average annual rainfall index: 1082.3 mm

== Economy ==
The most important economic activities are cattle raising and agriculture. The GDP in 2005 was R$31,323,000. Claro dos Poções is in the bottom tier of municipalities in the state with regard to economic and social development. It suffers from isolation, poor soils, drought, and inadequate transport connections. As of 2007 there were no banking agencies in the town. There was a small retail commerce serving the surrounding area of cattle and agricultural lands. In the rural area there were 578 establishments employing about 1,500 workers. Only 33 of the farms had tractors. There were 97 automobiles in all of the municipality.

== Health and education ==
- Municipal Human Development Index: 0.685 (2000)
- State ranking: 611 out of 853 municipalities as of 2000
- National ranking: 3,232 out of 5,138 municipalities as of 2000
- Literacy rate: 79%
- Life expectancy: 67 (average of males and females)

The highest-ranking municipality in Minas Gerais in 2000 was Poços de Caldas with 0.841, while the lowest was Setubinha with 0.568. Nationally the highest was São Caetano do Sul in São Paulo with 0.919, while the lowest was Setubinha.

There were five clinics but no hospitals. There were seven primary schools and two middle schools.

== Origin of the name ==
The town appeared around 1900, serving cattle ranches that belonged to the municipality of Coração de Jesus. In the area there were many clearings in the woodland, where the cattle drank from pools of water. Joining these characteristics the name Claro (clearing) dos Poções (pools) was chosen.

== See also ==
- List of municipalities in Minas Gerais
