= Glaucilândia =

Brazilian municipality located in the north of the state of Minas Gerais

Coordinates: 16°51′00″S 43°41′49″W

- Municipality
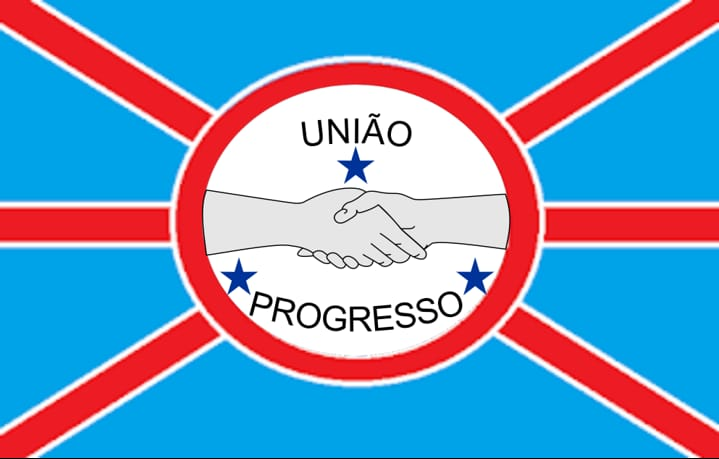
- Flag
- Interactive map of Glaucilândia
- Country: Brazil
- State: Minas Gerais
- Region: Southeast
- Time zone: UTC−3 (BRT)

Location of Glaucilândia within the state of Minas Gerais

Glacilândia is a Brazilian municipality located in the north of the state of Minas Gerais. In 2020 the population was 3,164 in a total area of 145 km^{2}. It became a municipality in 1996.

== Geography ==
Glaucilândia is located 30 km. southeast of Montes Claros on the right bank of the Rio Verde Grande, a tributary of the São Francisco River. It is on a railroad line now used only for cargo. The elevation of the municipal seat is 665 meters. Glaucilândia is part of the statistical microregion of Montes Claros.

== Economic activities ==
The most important economic activities are cattle raising, commerce, and subsistence agriculture. The GDP in 2005 was R$10,213,000. Glaucilândia is in the bottom tier of municipalities in the state with regard to economic and social development. It suffers from isolation, poor soils, and periodic drought. As of 2007 there were no banking agencies in the town. There was a small retail commerce serving the surrounding area of cattle and agricultural lands. In the rural area there were 109 establishments employing about 300 workers. Only 4 of the farms had tractors. There were 26 automobiles in all of the municipality. There were 3,000 head of cattle in 2006. The crops with a planted area of more than 100 hectares were beans and corn.

== Health and education ==
- Municipal Human Development Index: 0.696 (2000)
- State ranking: 562 out of 853 municipalities as of 2000
- National ranking: 3,053 out of 5,138 municipalities as of 2000
- Literacy rate: 82%
- Life expectancy: 69 (average of males and females)

The highest ranking municipality in Minas Gerais in 2000 was Poços de Caldas with 0.841, while the lowest was Setubinha with 0.568. Nationally the highest was São Caetano do Sul in São Paulo with 0.919, while the lowest was Setubinha.

In the health sector there were 7 clinics and no hospitals. In the educational sector there were 7 primary schools and 1 middle school.

== See also ==
- List of municipalities in Minas Gerais
