= Montes Claros =

- Municipality of Montes Claros
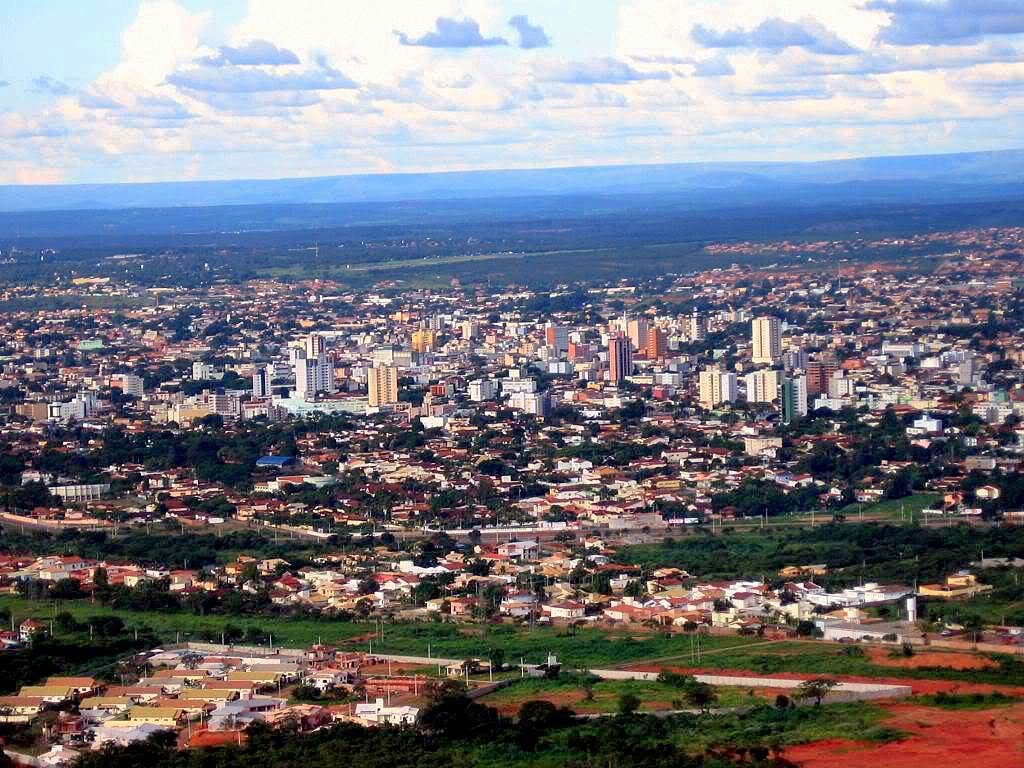
- Panoramic view of Montes Claros

- Flag Coat of arms
- Motto(s): Sub Umbra Alarum Tuarum "Under the shadow of Thy wings"
- Location in Minas Gerais state

- Location in Brazil
- Coordinates: 16°43′50″S 43°51′50″W
- Country: Brazil
- Region: Southeast
- State: Minas Gerais
- Mesoregion: Norte de Minas
- Microregion: Montes Claros
- Neighboring municipalities: North: São João da Ponte; Northeast: Capitão Enéas; East: Francisco Sá; Southeast: Juramento and Glaucilândia; South: Bocaiuva and Engenheiro Navarro; Southwest: Claro dos Poções; West: São João da Lagoa and Coração de Jesus; Northwest: Mirabela and Patis.
- Founded: 13 October 1831

Government
  - Mayor: Guilherme Guimarães (UNIÃO)
  - Term ends: 2028

Area
  - Total: 3,589.811 km^{2} (1,386.034 sq mi)
- Elevation: 678 m (2,224 ft)

Population (2022)
  - Total: 414,240
  - Estimate (2025): 437,601
  - Rank: MG: 5th
  - Density: 115.39/km^{2} (298.87/sq mi)
- Demonym: Montes-clarense
- Time zone: UTC−3 (BRT)
- Postal code: 39400-000 to 39429-999
- Districts: Aparecida do Mundo Novo, Ermidinha, Miralta, Montes Claros (Seat), Nova Esperança, Panorâmica, Santa Rosa de Lima, São João da Vereda, São Pedro de Garça, and Vila Nova de Minas
- Climate: Tropical (Aw)
- HDI (UNDP/2010): 0.770
- HDI rank: MG: 18th
- GDP (IBGE/2021): 10,800,251.127
- GDP per capita (IBGE/2021): 25870.23
- Distance to capital: 422 km (262 mi)
- Website: montesclaros.mg.gov.br

Montes Claros is a Brazilian municipality located in the northern region of the state of Minas Gerais. Situated north of the state capital, Belo Horizonte, it lies approximately 422 km (262 mi) away. The municipality spans an area of 3,589.811 km^{2} (1,386.034 sq mi), with 73.51 km^{2} (28.38 sq mi) within its urban area. As of the 2022 census, its population was 414,240, making it the fifth most populous municipality in Minas Gerais.

Montes Claros achieved emancipation in the 19th century and has long relied on industry and commerce as key economic drivers, establishing itself as a regional industrial hub. The municipality is currently divided into ten districts and further subdivided into approximately 200 neighborhoods and villages. It boasts a variety of natural, historical, and cultural attractions, including the Milton Prates Municipal Park, Guimarães Rosa Park, and Sapucaia Park, which are significant green spaces, as well as notable structures such as the Cathedral of Our Lady of Aparecida and the Small Church of the Little Hills, alongside numerous archaeological sites.

== History ==
=== Origins ===
Until the 1660s, the lands now comprising Montes Claros were inhabited solely by the indigenous Anais and Tapuia peoples. Around 1554, the Espinosa Expedition, consisting of 12 bandeirantes, explored the region in search of precious stones, venturing into the northern backlands of the Captaincy of São Paulo and Minas de Ouro. However, these explorers did not establish permanent settlements.

In 1674, Fernão Dias Pais, known as the "Emerald Hunter", led a bandeira to explore the region for precious stones. Antônio Gonçalves Figueira, a member of Fernão Dias’ expedition, accompanied it to the banks of the Paraopeba River, where, alongside Matias Cardoso de Almeida, he parted ways with the leader, who later returned to São Paulo two years later. There, Antônio and Matias established farms, which grew into settlements, displaced indigenous populations, and continued exploiting the region’s resources.

By a royal charter dated April 12, 1707, Antônio Gonçalves Figueira received a sesmaria grant of one league in width by three in length, forming the Montes Claros Farm (one of three farms) located at the headwaters of the Verde Grande River on its left bank. To access markets for cattle, Gonçalves Figueira built roads to Tranqueiras in Bahia and the São Francisco River. A native of São Paulo, Gonçalves Figueira later returned to his home region, entrusting the Montes Claros Farm to his brother Manuel Afonso de Siqueira, who owned neighboring farms.

Later, Gonçalves Figueira’s descendants sold portions of the Montes Claros Farm. Ensign José Lopes de Carvalho, whose nephew married Manuel Afonso de Siqueira’s granddaughter, acquired part of the farm and built a chapel, now the Nossa Senhora da Conceição and São José de Montes Claros Matrix Church. Around this chapel, the Arraial das Formigas developed, the second settlement on the Montes Claros Farm, which years later became the city bearing the same name.

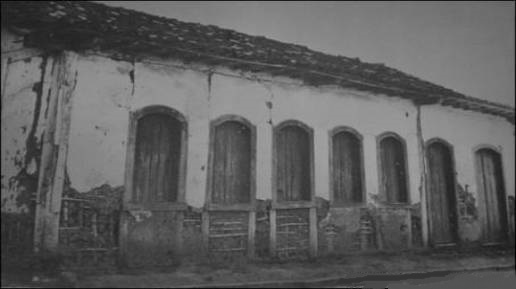
House of Ensign José Lopes de Carvalho

=== Administrative evolution ===
One hundred twenty-four years after Antônio Gonçalves Figueira obtained the sesmaria, the village had developed sufficiently to gain independence, separating from the municipality of Serro Frio (now Serro). Through the efforts of local political leaders, the municipality was established by the Law of October 13, 1831, named Montes Claros de Formigas. Its independent municipal life began in 1832 with the election and inauguration of the first Municipal Chamber.

By 1857, the then-village (municipality) of Montes Claros had just over 2,000 inhabitants, with infrastructure typical of most municipalities in the province. The municipality of Montes Claros de Formigas had existed since 1831 and began its independent municipal administration in 1832 with the inauguration of the Municipal Chamber and the election of its Executive Agent, equivalent to a mayor. Under Law 802 of July 3, 1857, the village was elevated to city status, officially adopting the name Montes Claros.[9] Despite starting its independent municipal life in 1832, the city traditionally celebrates its anniversary on July 3, referencing its elevation to city status rather than October 16, 1832, the date of its emancipation from Serro. This history was clarified in the article “The Invention of July 3” published in the journal Unimontes Científica.

Under provincial law no. 1398 of November 27, 1867, and state law no. 2 of September 14, 1891, the district of Brejos das Almas (formerly São Gonçalo do Brejo das Almas) was created, becoming the municipality’s first district. Over time, Montes Claros’ territory underwent several territorial losses and administrative reorganizations, eventually comprising its current districts in the 1980s: Aparecida do Mundo Novo, Ermidinha, Miralta, Nova Esperança, Panorâmica, Santa Rosa de Lima, São João da Vereda, São Pedro de Garça, and Vila Nova de Minas.

=== After the foundation ===
Following political emancipation, population growth necessitated investments in municipal urban infrastructure. In 1871, the Charity Hospital, later known as the Santa Casa de Caridade, was established. On February 2, 1880, the Montes Claros Normal School was founded. On February 24, 1884, the first issue of the weekly newspaper “Correio do Norte” was published. On September 14, 1886, the Santa Cruz Chapel, commonly known as the Morrinho Chapel, was inaugurated. On October 27, 1892, the city’s first telegraph line was established.

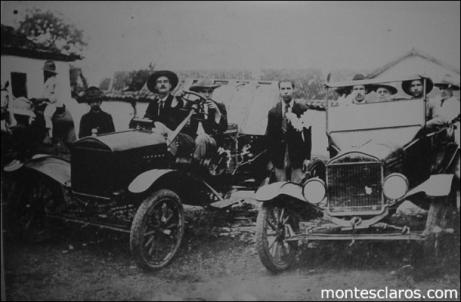
First automobiles in the city, 1920.

The industry in Montes Claros began with the Cedro textile factory in 1882, which was destroyed by a major fire on July 25, 1889. It provided primary education for its workers. In commerce, the Municipal Market, inaugurated on September 3, 1899, stood out. Located in what is now Dr. Carlos Versiani Square, it was an imposing structure with a tall tower housing a clock donated by Carlota Versiani, which chimed hourly. Throughout the 20th century, notable developments included the arrival of electricity on January 20, 1917, the first automobile on November 10, 1920, the establishment of potable water services on December 18, 1938, and the installation of intercity telephone services on June 30, 1956.

=== Economic and demographic growth ===
Montes Claros experienced significant industrialization starting in the 1970s. Industrial activities, supported by fiscal and financial incentives from federal, state, and municipal governments through the Superintendency for the Development of the Northeast (SUDENE), attracted substantial migration, leading to unplanned urban growth. This rapid urbanization, coupled with inadequate planning, resulted in intra-urban spatial disparities, with several areas marked by poverty. In the 1980s, significant urban changes occurred, including the occupation of vacant urban areas in the southern region, avenue renovations to improve traffic flow, verticalization in the central area, shifts in the spatial distribution of activities, and peripheral expansion.

Over time, efforts to reduce poverty levels were implemented. In 1970, 74.79% of the population lived in poverty, which decreased to 33.17% by 2001. The rural landscape has increasingly been replaced by urban zones to accommodate the demands of urban expansion driven by growing productive activities (industry, commerce, and services) and rising housing needs due to population concentration. The boundary between rural and urban areas is becoming less distinct, with the rural population declining annually.

== Geography ==
According to the Brazilian Institute of Geography and Statistics, Montes Claros covers an area of 3,589.811 km^{2} (1,386.034 sq mi), with 73.51 km^{2} (28.38 sq mi) constituting the urban area. It is located at 16°44'06" south latitude and 43°51'43" west longitude, approximately 422 km (262 mi) north of the state capital. Its neighboring municipalities are São João da Ponte to the north; Capitão Enéas to the northeast; Francisco Sá to the east; Juramento and Glaucilândia to the southeast; Bocaiuva and Engenheiro Navarro to the south; Claro dos Poções to the southwest; São João da Lagoa and Coração de Jesus to the west; and Mirabela and Patis to the northwest.

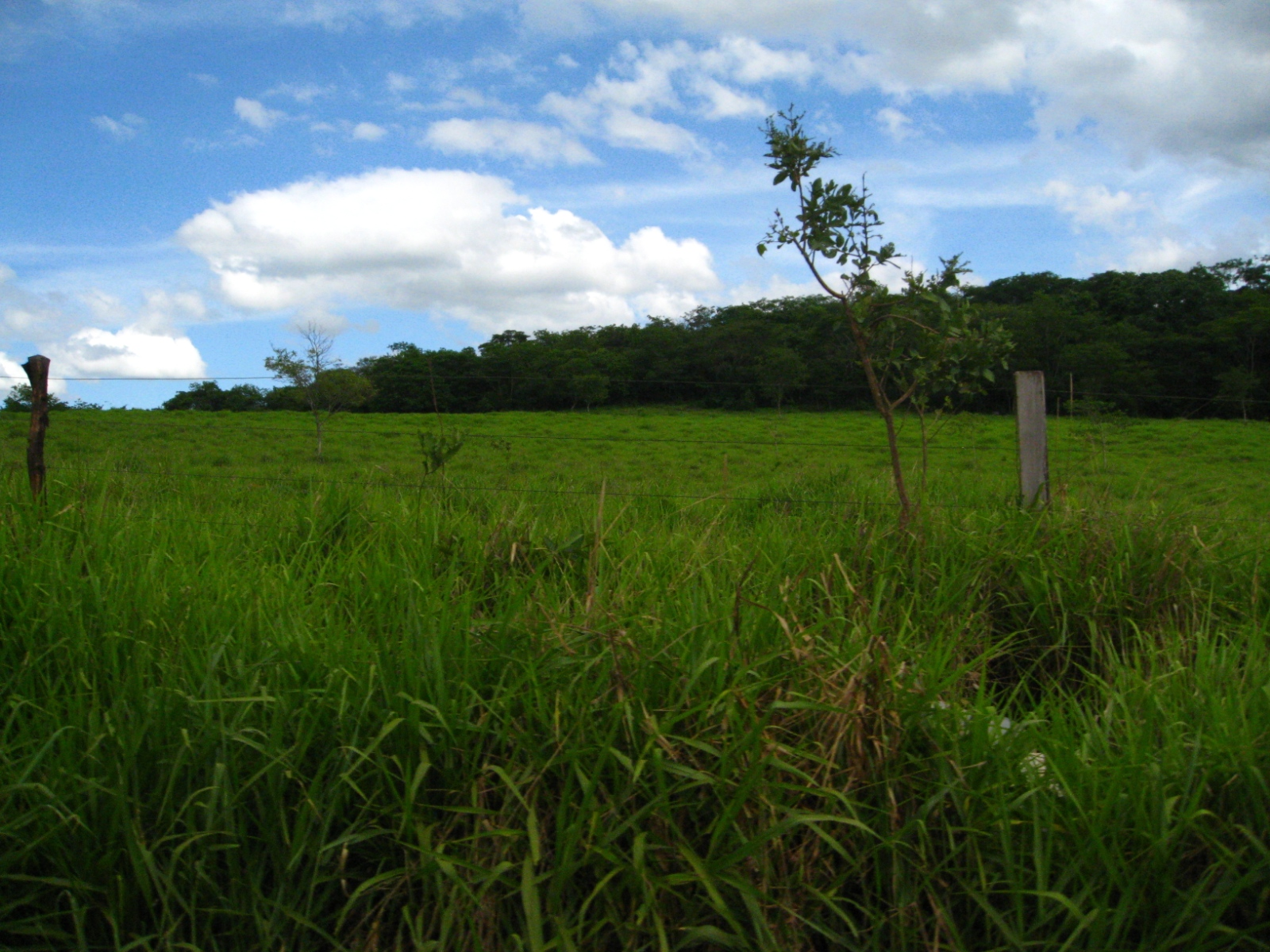
Pastures on undulating terrain in the rural area of Montes Claros.

Under the regional division effective since 2017, established by the IBGE, the municipality belongs to the Intermediate and Immediate Geographic Regions of Montes Claros. Previously, under the division into mesoregions and microregions, it was part of the Montes Claros microregion within the North of Minas mesoregion.

The city center has an average elevation of 655.21 m (2,149.6 ft). The highest point in the municipality is Morro Vermelho, reaching 1,075 m (3,527 ft). The terrain is predominantly undulating, characterized by rolling hills and mountains. The lowest elevation, 502 m (1,647 ft), is at the mouth of the Ribeirão do Ouro. Approximately 60% of the municipal terrain is undulating, 30% is flat, and 10% is mountainous.

Montes Claros lies within the São Francisco River Basin, and is traversed by the Vieira River, Cedro River, Verde Grande River, Pacuí River, São Lamberto River, and Riachão River. The municipality also features several lagoons: Tiriricas, Lagoão, Periperi, São João, Brejão, Garça, Vereda dos Caetanos, Mombuca, São Jorge, Freitas, Matos, and Barreiro. The soil predominantly consists of ancient Precambrian formations, with occurrences of siltstone, slate, limestone, phyllite, calcite, galena, iron ore, potassium nitrate, rock crystal, and alluvial gold.

=== Geology ===
A geological fault surrounds the city, identified as the cause of seismic activity. Extending approximately 3 km (1.9 mi) from the Vila Atlântica neighborhood to the Serra do Mel, it lies at a depth of 1.5 to 2 km (0.93 to 1.24 mi). Due to this fault, the ground experiences near-continuous tremors, according to reports from professors at the Department of Geophysics at the University of São Paulo (USP) and the Seismological Observatory at the University of Brasília (UnB).

The most intense earthquake recorded reached approximately 4.2 on the Richter scale, occurring on May 19, 2012, affecting 60 homes, six of which were declared uninhabitable and two interdicted by the city’s Civil Defense, leaving families displaced. Tremors exceeding 5 on the Richter scale are considered unlikely and unpredictable but possible. However, as tremors last only seconds, they pose no significant risk of severe damage. Seismographs recorded 174 earthquakes in Montes Claros from July to December 2012.

=== Climate ===
Highest 24-hour precipitation accumulations recorded in Montes Claros by month (INMET)
Month	Accumulation	Date	Month	Accumulation	Date
January	136.7 mm (5.38 in)	January 13, 1961	July	27.8 mm (1.09 in)	July 22, 1978
February	117.8 mm (4.64 in)	February 4, 2018	August	32.2 mm (1.27 in)	August 30, 1990
March	143 mm (5.6 in)	March 2, 1997	September	60.4 mm (2.38 in)	September 23, 2002
April	66.1 mm (2.60 in)	April 13, 1996	October	78.5 mm (3.09 in)	October 30, 2009
May	40.5 mm (1.59 in)	May 14, 2001	November	156.7 mm (6.17 in)	November 16, 1971
June	24.5 mm (0.96 in)	June 24, 2004	December	145 mm (5.7 in)	December 26, 2002
Period: January 1, 1961 to February 8, 1963 and October 1, 1968–present

The climate of Montes Claros is classified as tropical (type Aw according to the Köppen system), characterized by dry, mild winters and rainy summers with high temperatures, with an annual precipitation index of approximately 1,000 mm (39 in). During the dry season, relative humidity levels often drop significantly, frequently falling below 30%, and sometimes as low as 20%, well below the 60% recommended by the World Health Organization (WHO). During this period, wildfires become more frequent, particularly in rural areas, contributing to air quality degradation due to pollutant emissions.

According to data from the National Institute of Meteorology (INMET) for the periods from 1961 to 1963 and from 1968 onward, the lowest temperature recorded in Montes Claros was 5.8 °C (42.4 °F) on July 18, 2000, though the absolute minimum since 1912 was 3.2 °C (37.8 °F) on June 18, 1915. The highest temperature reached 40.4 °C (104.7 °F) on October 8, 2020, surpassing the previous record of 40.3 °C (104.5 °F) on November 6, 2015.

According to INMET, the highest 24-hour precipitation recorded during this period was 156.7 mm (6.17 in) on November 16, 1971. Other accumulations of 100 mm (3.9 in) or more include 143 mm (5.6 in) on March 2, 1997, 136.7 mm (5.38 in) on January 13, 1961, 136 mm (5.4 in) on January 4, 1961, 135.8 mm (5.35 in) on January 11, 1962, 128.3 mm (5.05 in) on January 20, 2013, 117.8 mm (4.64 in) on February 4, 2018, 114.3 mm (4.50 in) on December 18, 1989, 107.8 mm (4.24 in) on November 5, 1998, 105.4 mm (4.15 in) on January 1, 1962, and 101 mm (4.0 in) on December 20, 1993. January 1961, with 956.6 mm (37.66 in), which was the wettest month.

Climate data for Montes Claros (1991–2020 normals, extremes 1961–present)
Month	Jan	Feb	Mar	Apr	May	Jun	Jul	Aug	Sep	Oct	Nov	Dec	Year
Record high °C (°F)	38.0 (100.4)	37.8 (100.0)	37.4 (99.3)	36.0 (96.8)	34.4 (93.9)	35.2 (95.4)	33.6 (92.5)	36.8 (98.2)	40.5 (104.9)	40.7 (105.3)	40.3 (104.5)	37.8 (100.0)	40.7 (105.3)
Mean daily maximum °C (°F)	30.4 (86.7)	30.9 (87.6)	30.4 (86.7)	30.2 (86.4)	29.2 (84.6)	28.4 (83.1)	28.3 (82.9)	29.6 (85.3)	31.6 (88.9)	32.3 (90.1)	30.1 (86.2)	30.0 (86.0)	30.1 (86.2)
Daily mean °C (°F)	24.6 (76.3)	24.9 (76.8)	24.5 (76.1)	23.7 (74.7)	22.1 (71.8)	20.8 (69.4)	20.6 (69.1)	22.0 (71.6)	24.3 (75.7)	25.5 (77.9)	24.5 (76.1)	24.4 (75.9)	23.5 (74.3)
Mean daily minimum °C (°F)	19.9 (67.8)	19.9 (67.8)	19.9 (67.8)	18.6 (65.5)	16.3 (61.3)	14.6 (58.3)	14.0 (57.2)	15.1 (59.2)	17.7 (63.9)	19.8 (67.6)	20.2 (68.4)	20.2 (68.4)	18.0 (64.4)
Record low °C (°F)	14.6 (58.3)	15.0 (59.0)	12.6 (54.7)	11.4 (52.5)	6.4 (43.5)	6.5 (43.7)	5.8 (42.4)	7.7 (45.9)	10.0 (50.0)	12.0 (53.6)	12.8 (55.0)	14.7 (58.5)	5.8 (42.4)
Average precipitation mm (inches)	179.8 (7.08)	104.5 (4.11)	137.0 (5.39)	41.5 (1.63)	11.5 (0.45)	2.0 (0.08)	0.6 (0.02)	1.6 (0.06)	18.5 (0.73)	73.3 (2.89)	205.8 (8.10)	222.5 (8.76)	998.6 (39.31)
Average precipitation days	10	7	9	4	2	0	0	0	2	6	12	13	65
Average relative humidity (%)	70.4	68.2	72.1	69.6	65.7	62.3	57.0	50.6	47.6	53.3	69.1	73.5	63.3
Mean monthly sunshine hours	208.7	212.6	217.0	234.6	253.5	256.3	272.6	281.8	254.0	229.8	170.2	177.1	2,768.2
Source: INMET temperature records: 01/01/1961 to 08/02/1963 and 01/10/1968–present)

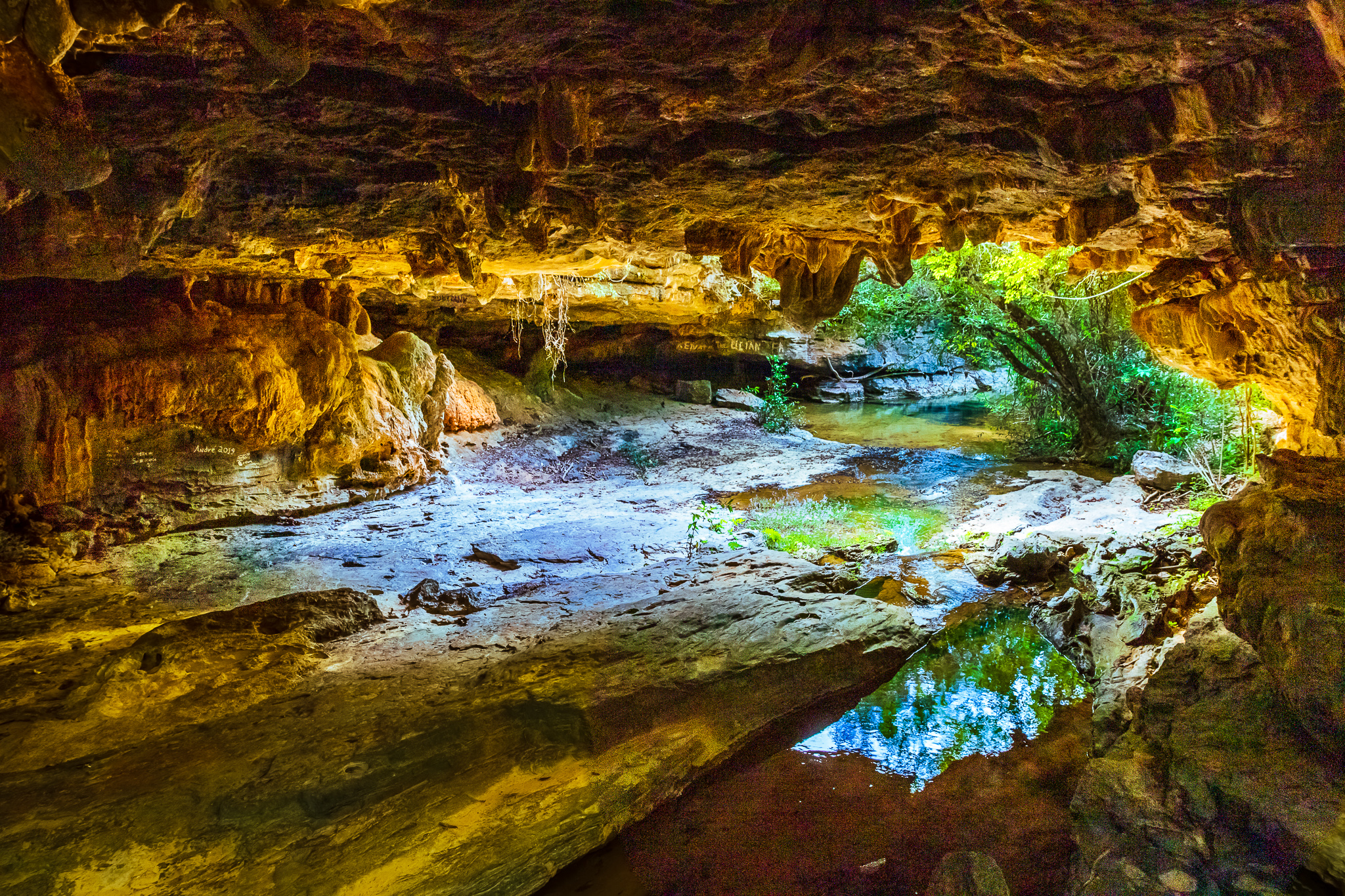
Lapa Grande State Park, located in Montes Claros.

=== Ecology and environment ===
Montes Claros is part of the Cerrado biome, featuring deciduous and semi-deciduous cerrado, with minor occurrences of evergreen cerrado and Caatinga hipoxerophytic vegetation. The regional flora includes species such as Tabebuia, Caryocar brasiliense, Aegiphila fluminensis, Hymenaea courbaril, Bromelia laciniosa, Schinopsis brasiliensis, and ceiba speciosa, alongside a rich variety of medicinal plants.

Under Law No. 3754 of June 15, 2007, which establishes the municipal policy for the protection, preservation, conservation, control, and recovery of Montes Claros’ environment, the Municipal Council for Environmental Protection and Conservation (CODEMA) is the public agency responsible for protecting, conserving, and improving the city's environment. It also oversees the management of the municipality’s Environmental Protection Areas.

== Subdivisions ==
Montes Claros is divided into ten districts: Aparecida do Mundo Novo, Ermidinha, Miralta, Montes Claros (Seat), Nova Esperança, Panorâmica, Santa Rosa de Lima, São João da Vereda, São Pedro de Garça, and Vila Nova de Minas. In 2000, their populations were 953, 1,614, 827, 293,903, 2,718, 222, 2,873, 1,386, 1,051, and 1,400, respectively, according to the IBGE census of that year. Throughout the 20th century, several districts were created, elevated to city status, or abolished, with the last change occurring on October 8, 1982, with the creation of the Aparecida do Mundo Novo district.

Currently, Montes Claros has approximately 160 neighborhoods, according to the “Grande Brasil” portal. One of the most populous is Major Prates, home to approximately 25,000 people.

== Demography ==
Population growth of Montes Claros (MG)
Year	Seat	Districts	Total
1808	400	600	1,000
1817	800	1,200	2,000
1832	1,000	2,350	3,350
1837	1,000	4,350	5,350
1838	1,000	4,519	5,519
1855			24,058
1872	10,005	30,312	40,317
1897	15,000	27,000	42,000
1900	18,000	36,356	54,356
1916	28,000	24,000	52,000
1940			61,532
1950	20,370	51,366	71,736
1955			68,971
1960	43,097	59,020	102,117
1970	85,154	31,332	116,486
1980	155,483	22,075	177,302
1991			250,062
2000	289,183	17,764	306,947
2010	344,479	17,492	361,971
2020			413,487
2022			414,240

The first population estimate was recorded when Montes Claros was known as Arraial das Formigas. In 1817, Saint-Hilaire wrote during a visit: “This settlement, which may currently comprise two hundred houses and over eight hundred souls, is certainly one of the most beautiful I have seen in the Province of Minas.”

According to the 1832 Imperial Brazilian Census, Montes Claros had 3,350 inhabitants, including 499 enslaved individuals (approximately 0.24% of the total in the Province of Minas Gerais).

The 1872 General Census of the Empire recorded 8,862 free individuals and 1,143 enslaved individuals in Montes Claros, totaling 10,005 inhabitants in the seat. Including districts and rural areas, the total population was 40,317.

On October 30, 1884, the Jequitaí district was elevated to the status of “City of Jequitaí,” reducing Montes Claros’ total population. In 1897, a study by Judge Antônio Augusto Velloso estimated the municipal population at 15,000, with districts and rural areas totaling about 42,000.

On September 7, 1923, the Brejo das Almas district was elevated to the city of Francisco Sá. On September 10, 1925, the Coração de Jesus district was elevated to city status, impacting Montes Claros’ total population count.

In 1940, the IBGE recorded 61,532 inhabitants, including 28,798 whites, 10,326 blacks, 2 Asians, 22,396 mixed-race individuals, and 10 undeclared. The 1950 census counted 71,736 inhabitants.

On December 12, 1953, the Juramento district was separated from Montes Claros and elevated to municipal status, leading to a population decrease in the 1955 census.

In 2000, according to IBGE census data, the population consisted of 131,231 whites (42.75%), 16,691 blacks (5.44%), 156,126 mixed-race individuals (50.86%), 260 Asians (0.08%), 1,153 indigenous (0.38%), and 1,485 undeclared (0.48%).

In 2010, the IBGE counted 361,971 inhabitants, making Montes Claros the sixth most populous municipality in the state and the 62nd in the country, with a population density of 101.05 inhabitants per km². According to the 2010 census, 174,281 were men and 187,690 were women. Additionally, 344,479 lived in the urban area and 17,492 in the rural area.

A 2010 genetic study revealed the population’s genetic composition as 52% European, 39% African, and 9.0% indigenous.

According to the 2022 IBGE census, the population self-identified as 60% mixed-race, 28% white, 10% black, 0.11% indigenous, and 0.1% Asian.

=== Human Development Index ===
As in much of Brazil, the rapid population growth in Montes Claros during the 1970s, driven by intense migration and poor planning, led to intra-urban spatial disparities, with several areas marked by poverty. Until around 1970, urban occupation was limited to the city center and adjacent neighborhoods. From that period, significant urban changes occurred, with the northern, eastern, and southern zones experiencing more intense population growth than the wealthier western zone. Urban expansion was uneven, resulting in persistent urban voids alongside underdeveloped neighborhoods and slums.

In the urban area, population distribution correlates closely with residents’ socioeconomic status, contributing to economic inequality in the city. Neighborhoods near the center are home to higher-income populations, while peripheral areas house the most underdeveloped communities. According to the IBGE, in 2002, the Living Conditions Index (ICV) was highest in the Cidade Santa Maria (0.81), Todos os Santos (0.68), and São Luís (0.73) neighborhoods, located centrally, and lowest in Vila Mauriceia (0.31), Vera Cruz (0.37), and Vila Atlântida (0.27), all situated in peripheral areas.

In 2009, the IBGE reported a Gini coefficient of 0.41, indicating social inequality, with 1.00 being the worst and 0.00 the best. Poverty incidence, as measured by the IBGE, was 31.37%, with a lower limit of 21.74%, an upper limit of 41.00%, and subjective poverty incidence at 26.03%.

The Municipal Human Development Index (HDI-M) of Montes Claros is considered high by the United Nations Development Programme (UNDP), at 0.770, ranking 227th among Brazil’s 5,565 municipalities. Most of the city’s indicators are average and align closely with national averages, according to the UNDP.

=== Religion ===
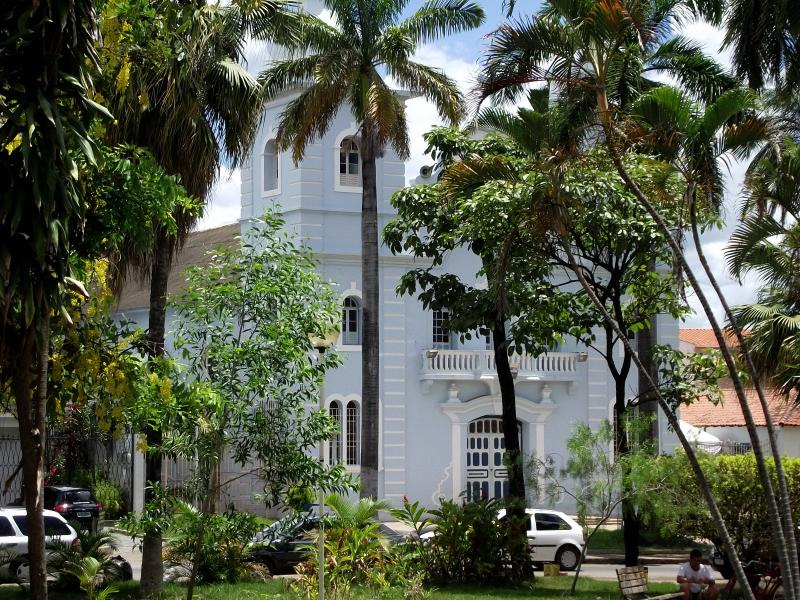
Montes Claros Matrix Church.

Reflecting the cultural diversity of Montes Claros, the city hosts a variety of religious denominations. While it developed within a predominantly Catholic social framework, numerous Protestant denominations are now present.

Located in the world’s most Catholic country by absolute numbers, the Catholic Church in Montes Claros had its legal status recognized by the federal government in October 2009, despite Brazil being an officially secular state.

The municipality is home to various evangelical and Reformed denominations, including the Assembly of God, Maranata Christian Church, Presbyterian Church, Baptist churches, Seventh-day Adventist Church, and Universal Church of the Kingdom of God, among others. According to the 2000 IBGE census, the population comprises Catholics (77.13%), evangelicals (15.58%), non-religious individuals (4.02%), Spiritists (0.66%), and 2.61% distributed among other religions.

== Politics and administration ==
Under the 1988 Constitution, Montes Claros operates within the framework of a federative presidential republic, inspired by the United States model but following the Roman-Germanic tradition of positive law. Municipal administration is divided between the executive power and legislative power.

Before 1930, municipalities were led by municipal chamber presidents, also known as executive agents or intendants. Following the 1930 Revolution, municipal powers were separated into executive and legislative branches. The first intendant was José Pinheiro Neves, and the first executive leader and mayor was Orlando Ferreira Pinto. Over 29 terms, 25 mayors and 22 executive agents have led Montes Claros. In 2008, Luiz Tadeu Leite of the Brazilian Democratic Movement Party (PMDB) won the municipal elections with 96,374 votes (52.58% of valid votes) in the second round, which was necessary because the city has over 200,000 voters and Tadeu did not secure over 50% in the first round.

The legislative power is exercised by the Municipal Chamber, comprising 15 councilors elected for four-year terms, in accordance with Article 29 of the Constitution. The chamber is responsible for drafting and voting on fundamental laws for the administration and the Executive, particularly the participatory budget (Budget Guidelines Law).

Montes Claros is governed by an organic law enacted on February 1, 2007. The city also serves as the seat of a comarca. In 2010, the municipality had 238,405 voters, a 10.9% increase from 2006.

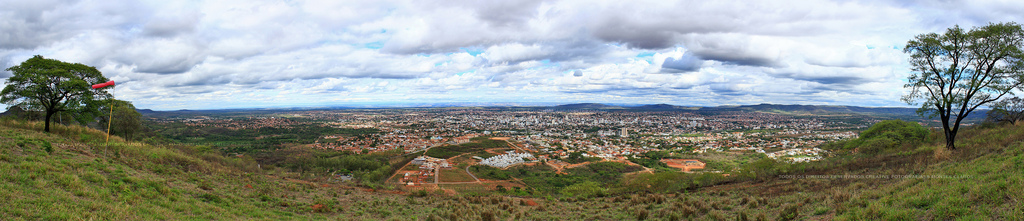
Panoramic view of Montes Claros.

== Economy ==
Montes Claros has the largest gross domestic product (GDP) in its microregion, excelling in the service sector. According to 2020 IBGE data, the municipality’s GDP was 9,686,454.28 reais. Of this, 1,056,788.90 million reais are taxes on products net of subsidies at current prices. The per capita GDP is 23,426.26 reais, and the income HDI is 0.707.

In 2008, the city had 9,497 local units, 9,127 companies and active commercial establishments, and 130,045 workers, with a total workforce of 70,691 and 59,354 salaried employees. Salaries and other remunerations totaled 691,296 reais, with an average monthly wage of 2.2 minimum wages.

=== Sectors ===
The economy of Montes Claros is diversified across agricultural, industrial, and service activities. The primary economic driver is the tertiary sector, encompassing various commerce and service segments, such as education and healthcare. The secondary sector follows, with large-scale industrial complexes and small to medium-sized production units.

Primary

Production of sugarcane, cassava, and corn
Product	Harvested area (Hectares)	Production (Tons)
Sugarcane	480	38,400
Cassava	470	5,640
Corn	2,720	5,440

Agriculture is the least significant sector of Montes Claros’ economy, contributing 77,393 million reais to the gross value added of the GDP. In 2009, the IBGE reported a livestock inventory of 159,830 cattle, 14,810 pigs, 6,596 horses, 1,130 mules, 620 goats, 210 donkeys, 630 sheep, and 2,202,300 poultry, including 1,618,000 hens and 584,300 roosters, broilers, and chicks. In 2009, the city produced 25,603 million liters of milk from 20,120 cows, 38,879 dozen eggs, and 11,100 kilograms of honey. Temporary agriculture primarily produces sugarcane (38,400 tons), cassava (5,640 tons), and corn (5,440 tons).

Secondary

The industry is currently the second most significant sector, contributing 774,539 million reais to the gross value added of the GDP. The city is home to an industrial district spanning 5.2 million m², managed by the Minas Gerais Economic Development Company (CODEMIG), one of the most important industrial complexes in Minas Gerais. Plans are underway for a second industrial district with a projected area of 1.5 million m². A Petrobras biodiesel plant, established in 2008, is also operational.

In 2011, the municipal government reported 954 industrial establishments and 9,912 workers in the industrial sector. Major companies with industrial facilities include Coteminas, Lafarge, Novo, Nestlé, and Petrobras.

Tertiary

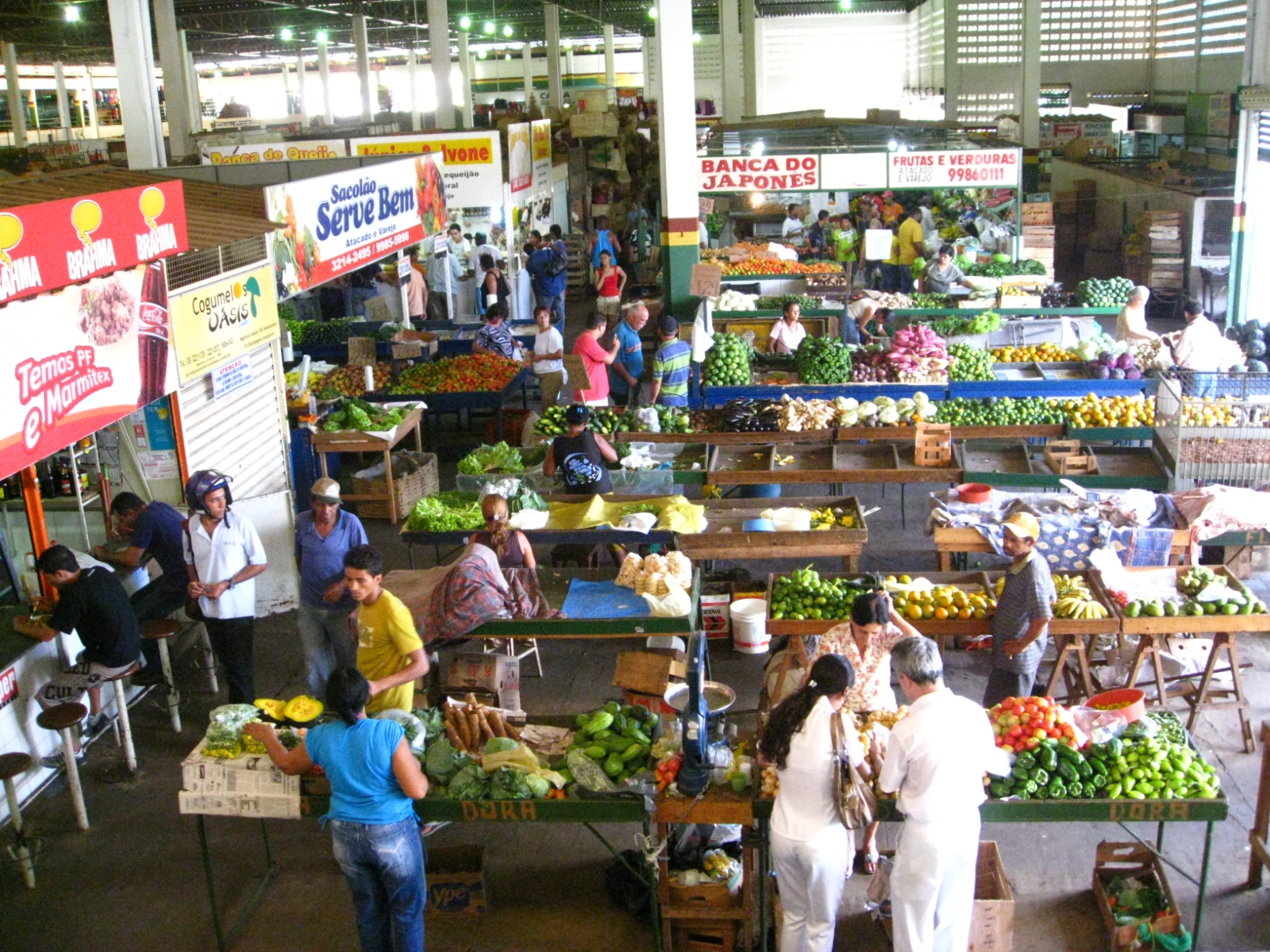
Interior of the Montes Claros Municipal Market.

The tertiary sector generates 2,220,660 million reais for the municipal GDP, making it the largest contributor. Much of this value comes from commerce. In 2009, the city had 617 construction establishments with 3,185 workers, 6,777 commercial establishments with 14,997 workers, and 5,091 service establishments with 24,473 workers.

The city has several commercial hubs, including the Montes Claros Municipal Market, opened in 1899; Ibituruna Center, established on March 18, 2009; Montes Claros Shopping, founded on November 8, 1997; and Shopping Popular Mário Ribeiro, inaugurated in 2003. As in much of Brazil, the peak sales period is Christmas.

=== Tax and financial incentives ===
Although located in Brazil’s Southeast Region, Montes Claros, due to its edaphoclimatic, economic, social, and cultural characteristics, is included in the Minas Gerais area of the Superintendency for the Development of the Northeast (SUDENE), receiving tax and financial incentives from this regional development agency. Through SUDENE, the city benefits from investment projects funded by the Northeast Development Fund, covering up to 60% of total fixed and circulating investments. SUDENE also provides exemptions from the Additional Freight for the Brazilian Merchant Navy (AFRMM) and the Tax on Financial Operations (IOF).

The city is served by an extensive banking network, including private financial institutions and credit cooperatives, as well as branches of Banco do Brasil, Caixa Econômica Federal, and Banco do Nordeste. Operating with various credit arrangements under the Northeast Constitutional Financing Fund (FNE), and transfers from the National Bank for Economic and Social Development (BNDES) and the Worker Support Fund (FAT), Banco do Nordeste is, according to the municipal government, the primary financial institution supporting the region’s economic activities.

== Infrastructure ==
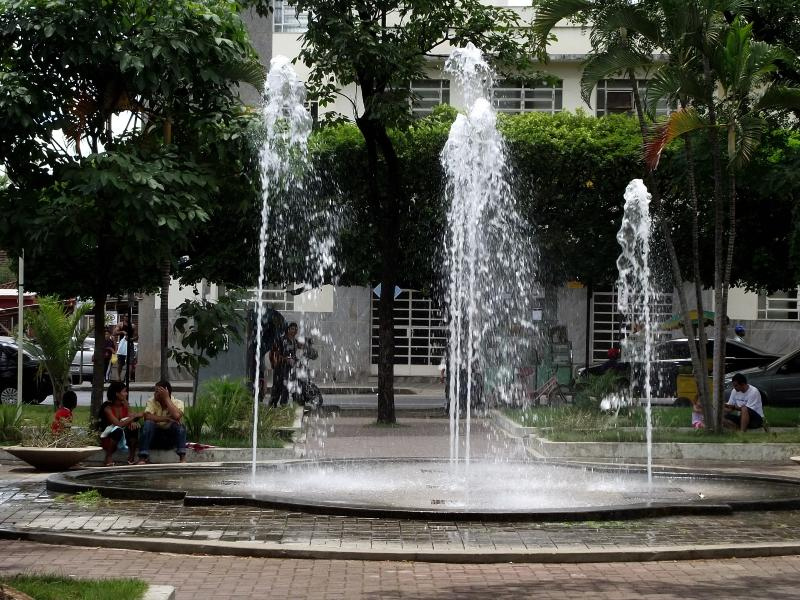
Praça da Matriz, located in the city center.

In the year 2000, the municipality had 75,676 households, comprising apartments, houses, and individual rooms. Of these, 59,703 were owned properties, with 56,714 fully paid off (74.94%), 2,989 in the process of acquisition (3.95%), and 10,103 rented (13.35%). Additionally, 5,553 properties were provided free of charge, with 1,190 supplied by employers (1.57%) and 4,363 provided through other means (5.77%). A further 317 households were occupied in other ways (0.40%). The municipality has treated water, electricity, sewerage, urban cleaning services, fixed-line telephony, and mobile telephony. In 2000, 92.77% of households were served by the public water supply network; 90.04% of residences had waste collected by municipal cleaning services; and 85.52% of homes were connected to the general sewer or stormwater drainage system.

=== Healthcare ===
In 2009, Montes Claros had 224 healthcare facilities, including hospitals, emergency rooms, health centers, and dental services, with 83 being public and 141 private. These facilities provided 921 hospital beds for inpatient care, with 241 in public institutions and 680 in private ones. The city is home to six general hospitals: one public, two private, and three philanthropic. Montes Claros also employs 8,780 healthcare professionals. In 2008, the city recorded 5,167 live births, with 7.7% being premature, 38.5% delivered via caesarean section, and 16.8% born to mothers aged 10 to 19 years (0.5% to mothers aged 10 to 14). The crude birth rate in that year was 14.4 per 1,000 inhabitants. The Human Development Index (HDI) for longevity in Montes Claros is 0.868.

Notable hospitals in the city include Aroldo Tourinho, Clemente de Farias (University Hospital), Fundação Hospitalar Dilson de Quadros Godinho (São Lucas), Alpheu de Quadros, and Santa Casa. The Santa Casa de Montes Claros, officially known as Irmandade Nossa Senhora das Mercês, is considered the largest healthcare facility in the northern region of Minas Gerais.

=== Education ===
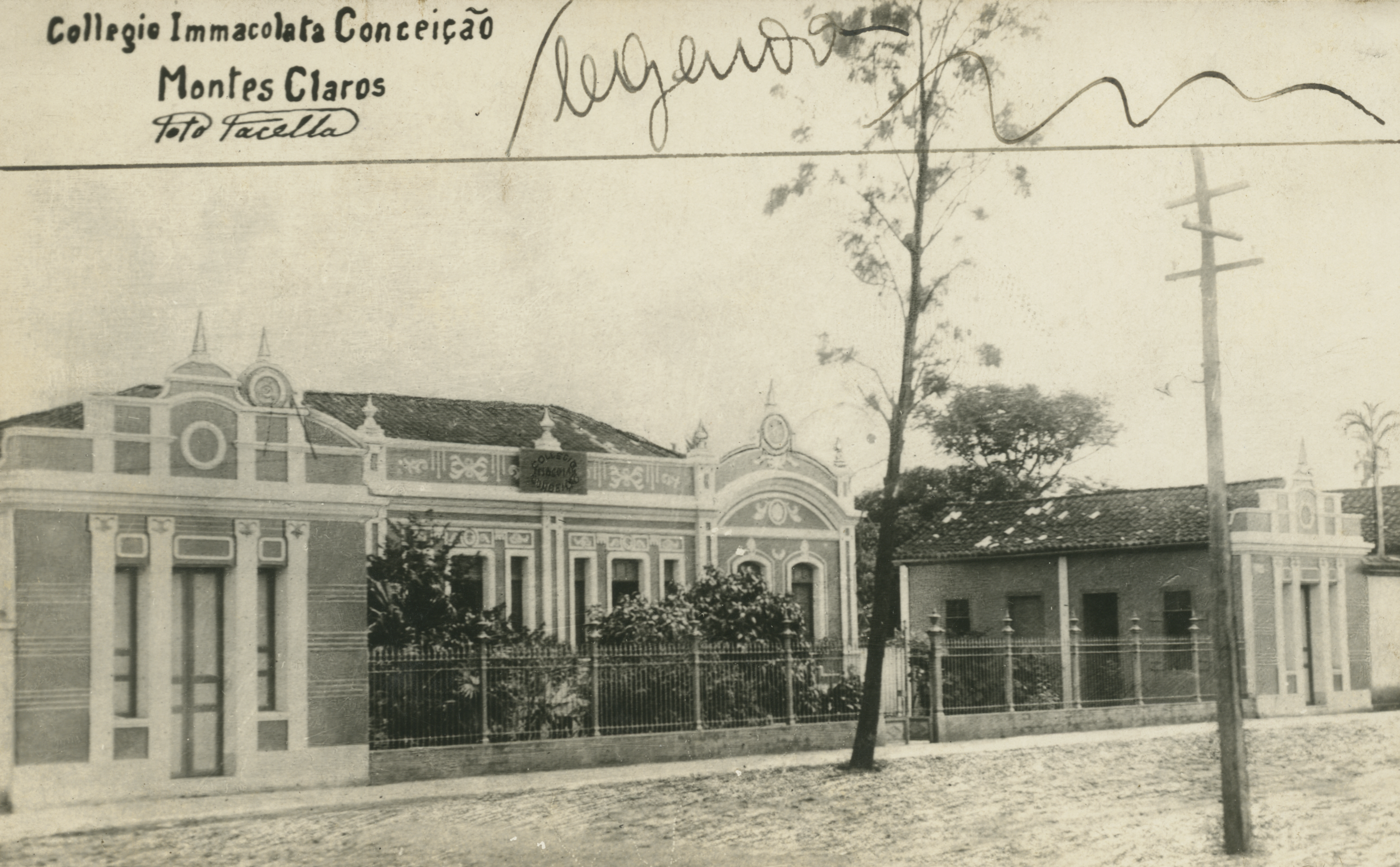
Colégio Imaculada Conceição, 1950s. National Archives.

Montes Claros has schools in all its regions. Residents of rural areas have easy access to schools in nearby urban neighborhoods due to the high level of urbanization. The average Basic Education Development Index (IDEB) among public schools in Montes Claros in 2009 was 4.85, surpassing the national average of 4.0 for municipal and state schools across Brazil. In 2009, the municipality recorded approximately 83,846 enrollments, 4,586 teachers, and 342 schools in both public and private networks. The Human Development Index (HDI) for education was 0.744, classified as high.

As a regional university hub, Montes Claros is home to three public higher education institutions: the Federal Institute of Northern Minas Gerais - Montes Claros Campus, the State University of Montes Claros (Unimontes), and the Federal University of Minas Gerais (UFMG) through its Institute of Agricultural Sciences (ICA). Additionally, several private colleges offer courses in various fields.

According to data from the Anísio Teixeira National Institute for Educational Studies and Research (INEP) and the Ministry of Education (MEC), the illiteracy rate in 2000 among individuals aged 18 to 24 was 2.51%. In the same year, the adult literacy rate was 90.08%, compared to the national rate of 84%. The gross school attendance rate in 2000 was 74.41%, lower than the national average of 81.5%. Additionally, 10,169 residents had less than one year of formal education or no education at all. In 2010, 241 students were enrolled in special education programs, and 2,321 children attended preschools, with 130 preschool students receiving full-time instruction.

Education in Montes Claros by numbers
Level	Enrollments	Teachers	Schools (Total)
Early childhood education	8,997	458	126
Primary education	56,792	2,973	169
Secondary education	18,057	1,155	47

=== Public safety and crime ===
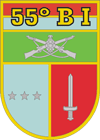
Emblem of the 55th Infantry Battalion.

As in most medium and large Brazilian municipalities, crime remains a significant issue in Montes Claros. In 2008, the homicide rate was 28.7 per 100,000 inhabitants, ranking 34th in the state and 534th nationally. The suicide rate for the same year was 8.1 per 100,000 inhabitants, placing it 81st in the state and 570th nationally. The rate of deaths due to traffic accidents was 33.8 per 100,000 inhabitants, ranking 45th in the state and 389th nationally.

According to the Military Police of Minas Gerais State (PMMG), the city's battalion also serves 23 other municipalities in northern Minas Gerais, increasing demands for additional police personnel in Montes Claros. PMMG data from 2009 indicates that 74% of the prison population consisted of young individuals, with many arrests linked to drug trafficking. The city is also home to the 55th Infantry Battalion (Dionísio Cerqueira Battalion, or 55th BI), a Brazilian Army unit established on 19 April 1851, subordinate to the 4th Military Region.

=== Services and communications ===
Water supply and sewage collection in Montes Claros, as in the broader region, are managed by Copasa (Minas Gerais Sanitation Company). Electricity distribution, as is the case in most of Minas Gerais, is provided by Cemig (Minas Gerais Energy Company). In 2003, there were 101,502 electricity consumers, with a total consumption of 368,217,506 kWh.

Internet services, including dial-up and broadband (ADSL), are offered by various free and paid ISPs. Mobile phone services are provided by multiple operators. The area code (DDD) for Montes Claros is 038. The Postal Code (CEP) ranges from 39400-001 to 39409-999. On 10 November 2008, Montes Claros and other cities with the 038 area code gained access to number portability, allowing users to switch operators without changing their phone numbers.

The city has both print and digital newspapers in circulation. In 2004, there were four print newspapers. In 2001, according to the Minas Gerais Radio and TV Association (AMIRT) and Telemig, there were eight radio stations, a number that has since increased. Notable radio stations include 98 FM, the first in northern Minas Gerais, established in May 1981; Rádio Unimontes 101.1 FM; and Rádio Transamérica Pop 95.1 FM.

=== Transportation ===
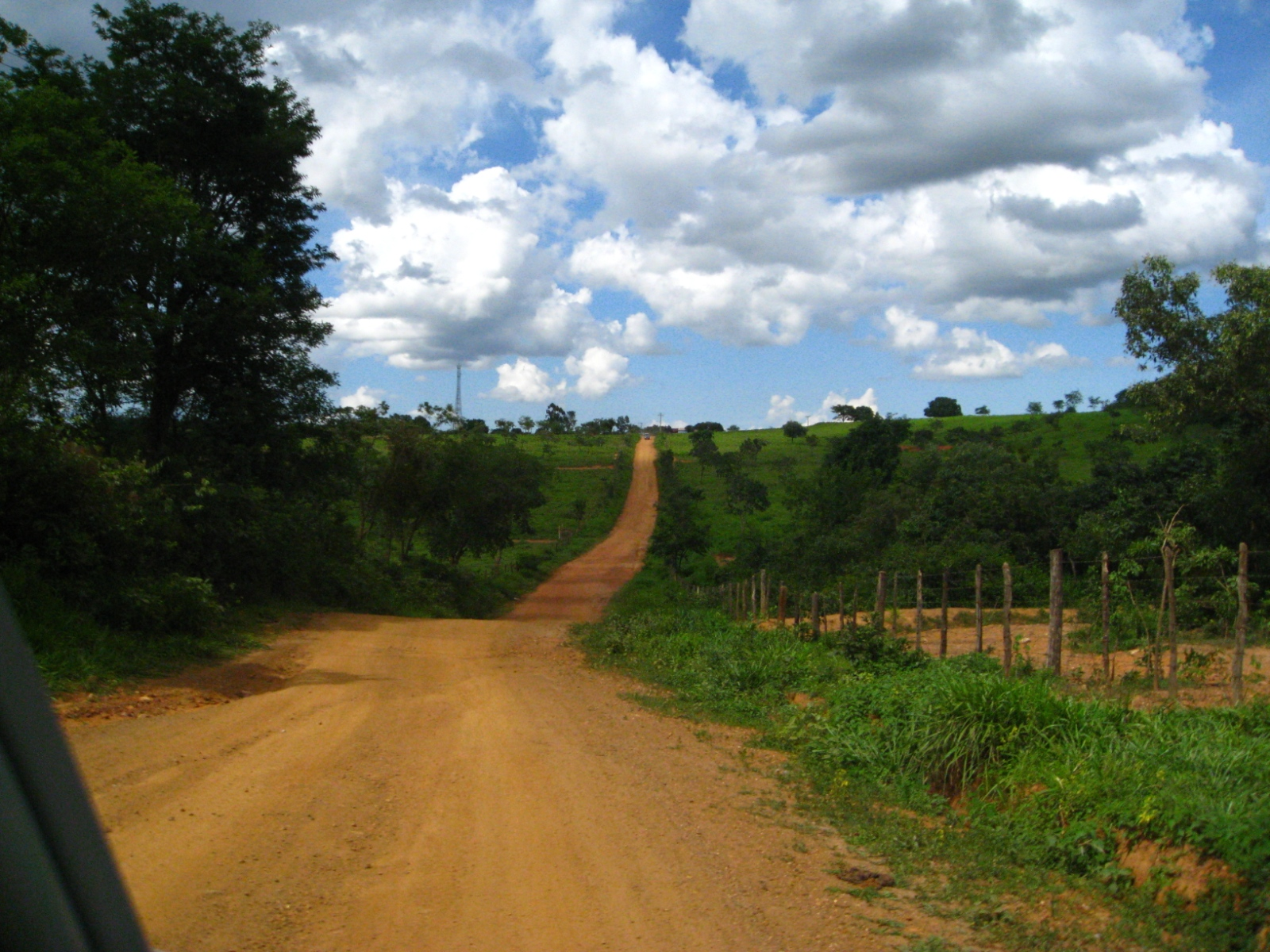
Dirt road in the rural area.

Due to the scarcity of rivers, Montes Claros has little tradition of water-based transportation. The city was once served by the Central do Brasil Railway, operational from 1858 to 1969, with passenger services at the Montes Claros station continuing until 1996, connecting to Monte Azul. Today, the station is used solely for freight trains. The city has easy access to major highways, including BR-135, connecting mid-northern Brazil (Maranhão) to Belo Horizonte; BR-365, linking Montes Claros to Pirapora and Uberlândia; BR-251, extending from Bahia to Mato Grosso; and BR-122, running from Fortaleza, Ceará, to Montes Claros at the BR-251 junction. The Mário Ribeiro Airport, inaugurated on 18 December 1939, features a 45-meter-wide, 2,100-meter-long asphalt runway and an annual capacity of 70,000 passengers. Additionally, there are two smaller privately managed airports, each with a 1,150-meter runway.

In 2009, the municipal vehicle fleet totaled 120,436 vehicles, including 53,200 cars, 3,769 trucks, 398 tractor trucks, 8,079 pickups, 204 minibuses, 47,095 motorcycles, 6,765 mopeds, 917 buses, and nine wheeled tractors. Paved, divided avenues and numerous traffic lights facilitate urban traffic, but the rapid increase in vehicles over the past decade has led to slower traffic, particularly in the city center. Finding parking spaces in the commercial district has also become challenging, impacting local businesses.

The Municipal Company for Planning, Management, and Education in Traffic and Transportation (McTrans) regulates public transportation, manages traffic, and issues fines through its traffic officers for violations. Electronic speed radars on major avenues assist in enforcement. Public transportation is operated by Transmoc and Alprino. The Association of Urban Public Transport Companies of Montes Claros (ATCMC), founded on 23 February 1988, unites companies involved in municipal public transport. The Hildeberto Alves de Freitas Bus Terminal, a key regional bus terminal, was inaugurated on 3 October 1980.

== Culture ==
The Municipal Secretariat of Culture oversees cultural activities in Montes Claros, aiming to develop and implement cultural policies through programs, projects, and activities. Affiliated with the Mayor's Office, it operates as part of the municipality's indirect administration, with administrative and financial autonomy ensured by budgetary allocations, its own assets, revenue application, and contracts with other institutions.

=== Arts and crafts ===
According to the municipality, Montes Claros currently lacks dedicated performance venues, except for theater spaces such as the one at Colégio Imaculada Conceição. The Montes Claros Cultural Center, opened in February 2010, houses a library focused on regional themes, a bookstore managed by the UFMG Press, and an office of the Foundation for Research Development (Fundep). Institutions such as the Lorenzo Fernandez State Music Conservatory and the Faculty of Artistic Education at the State University of Montes Claros (UNIMONTES) support the performing arts, offering courses, staging performances, and advocating for a dedicated performance venue. A major event is the Montes Claros Film Festival, held annually in May since 2010, showcasing films by Brazilian directors, including those from northern Minas Gerais, through exhibitions such as "Digital Norte Mineira," "Children's Films," and "Competitive Shorts and Features." Notable figures in the local arts scene include Beto Guedes, a guitarist, singer, and composer; Cyro dos Anjos, a chronicler, novelist, essayist, and memoirist; Tião Carreiro, a sertanejo singer; and Darcy Ribeiro, an anthropologist, politician, and writer.

Handicrafts are a vibrant form of cultural expression in Montes Claros. Throughout the city, unique artisanal products are crafted using regional raw materials, reflecting local culture and lifestyles. Various groups unite artisans, providing spaces for creating, displaying, and selling handmade goods, typically at fairs, exhibitions, or shops. Prominent in this field is the artist Yara Tupynambá.

=== Tourism and events ===
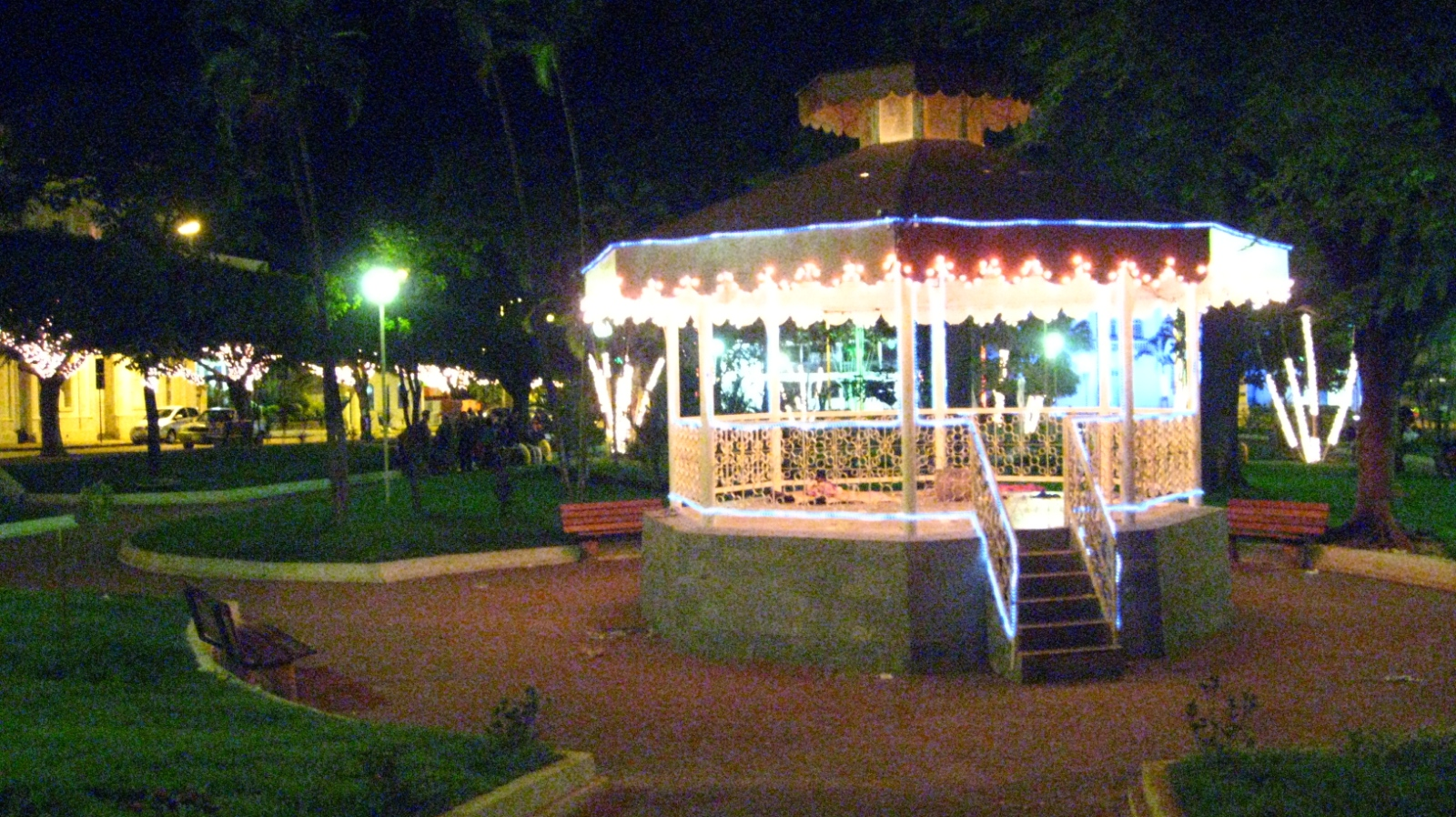
Night view of Praça da Matriz.

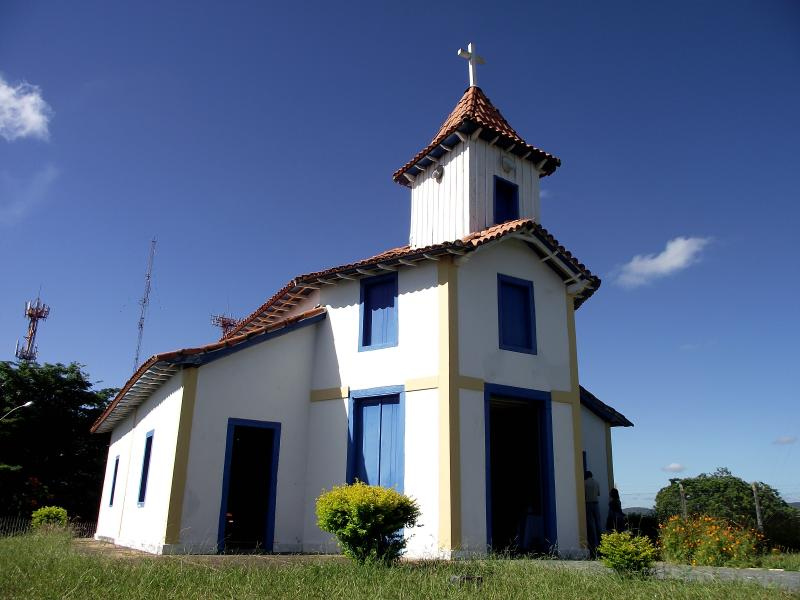
Morrinhos Church.

Montes Claros boasts numerous tourist attractions, including the Milton Prates Municipal Park, a large green space housing the Municipal Zoo; Sapucaia Park, located in the Ibituruna Mountain Range, a forested reserve ideal for extreme sports; the Guimarães Rosa Park, established by Municipal Law No. 793 on 7 August 1989, one of the largest green areas in the urban perimeter; Lapa Encantada, featuring waterfalls and 1 km of underground rivers; Engenho Cave, open for visitation; the Lapa Grande Complex, home to a 3-km cave among the largest in Minas Gerais, containing fossilized animal remains; and landmarks such as the Our Lady of Aparecida Cathedral, standing at 65.08 meters, the Matrix Church, and the Morrinhos Church. The city also has 164 cataloged archaeological sites, with the Lapa Grande Speleological Complex standing out for its archaeological significance, featuring rare volcanic speleothems.

To boost local socioeconomic development, the Montes Claros municipality, often in partnership with local businesses, invests in festivals and events. These attractions draw visitors from other cities, which requires improved infrastructure and professionalization of the sector. This benefits both tourists and residents. Events occur year-round, including the Pequi Festival in January; Carnamontes in February or March; the International Folk Dance Festival in May; June Festivals in June or July; the Agricultural Exposition at João Alencar Athayde Park in July; the August Festivals (Catopês); the National Industry, Commerce, and Services Fair (FENICS) in August; and the Psiu Poético National Poetry Salon in October.

=== Sports ===
As in much of Brazil, football is the most popular sport in Montes Claros. The city is home to several clubs, including Montes Claros Futebol Clube, founded on 28 August 1990; Funorte Esporte Clube, established on 4 May 2007; Associação Atlética Cassimiro de Abreu, founded on 28 May 1948; and Associação Desportiva Ateneu, created on 1 May 1947. Football stadiums include João Rebello Stadium, with a capacity of 4,550; José Maria de Melo Stadium, holding 3,346; Dr. Rubens Durães Peres Stadium, with 1,000 seats; Ivani Martins Pereira Stadium, also with 1,000 seats; and various smaller fields throughout the city.

Montes Claros also excels in other sports, such as volleyball. The Foundation for Educational Development of Montes Claros (FUNADEM), established in 2009, gained national recognition by winning the International Volleyball Circuit, a friendly event held in the city in 2009 with teams from other countries. The city has five sports arenas, the largest being the Presidente Tancredo Neves Sports Complex, with a capacity of 12,000; six public spaces designated for walking tracks; and 15 social clubs.

=== Holidays ===
Montes Claros observes three municipal holidays, eight national holidays, and three optional holidays. The municipal holidays are Corpus Christi, celebrated on the Thursday following the Sunday of the Holy Trinity; the anniversary of the city's emancipation on 3 July; and Black Awareness Day on 20 November. According to Federal Law No. 9,093, enacted on September 12, 1995, municipalities may designate up to four municipal holidays, including Good Friday.

== Notable people ==
- Kamilla Cardoso, basketball player
- Barbara Fialho, model
- Ronildo Pereira de Freitas (born 1977), football player
- André Muniz, MMA fighter
- Nikão, football player
- Odair, football player
- Hugo Ragelli, football player
- Anne Shibuya, curler
- Yara Tupynambá (born 1932), artist

== See also ==
- List of municipalities in Minas Gerais

== Bibliography ==
- AZEVEDO, Mariângela Praes. Pelos Caminhos do Vieira. Available at <http://kawa.soe.umich.edu/riverwalk/Tours/5fb58a0d33edf16312ec68e55faac239/index_html/view>. Accessed on 1 April 2008.
- OLIVEIRA & RODRIGUES. Formação Social e Econômica do Norte de Minas. Montes Claros: Editora UNIMONTES. 2000.
- PAULA, Hermes. Montes Claros, sua história e sua gente. 1957.
- PEREIRA e OLIVEIRA. A invenção do 03 de julho. UNIMONTES CIENTÍFICA. http://www.ruc.unimontes.br/index.php/unicientifica/article/view/57
- VIANNA, Urbino. Monografia Histórica, Geográfica e Descriptiva de Montes Claros. 1916.
