= São João =

São João, Portuguese for "Saint John", may refer to:

== Architecture ==
- Forte de São João (disambiguation)
- Capela de São João Batista (Chapel of St. John the Baptist), Church of São Roque, Lisbon

== Places ==
=== Brazil ===
- Barra de São João, Casimiro de Abreu, Rio de Janeiro
- Cedro de São João, Sergipe
- Mata de São João, Bahia
- São João, Paraná
- São João, Pernambuco
- São João d'Aliança, Goiás
- São João do Araguaia, Pará
- São João do Arraial, Piauí
- São João da Baliza, Roraima
- São João da Barra, Rio de Janeiro
- São João Batista, Maranhão
- São João Batista, Santa Catarina
- São João Batista do Glória, Minas Gerais
- São João da Boa Vista, São Paulo
- São João do Caiuá, Paraná
- São João da Canabrava, Piauí
- São João do Cariri, Paraíba
- São João do Carú, Maranhão
- São João das Duas Pontes, São Paulo
- São João Evangelista, Minas Gerais
- São João da Fronteira, Piauí
- São João de Iracema, São Paulo
- São João do Itaperiú, Santa Catarina
- São João do Ivaí, Paraná
- São João do Jaguaribe, Ceará
- São João da Lagoa, Minas Gerais
- São João do Manhuaçu, Minas Gerais
- São João do Manteninha, Minas Gerais
- São João da Mata, Minas Gerais
- São João de Meriti, Rio de Janeiro
- São João das Missões, Minas Gerais
- São João Nepomuceno, Minas Gerais
- São João do Oeste, Santa Catarina
- São João do Oriente, Minas Gerais
- São João do Pacuí, Minas Gerais
- São João do Paraíso, Maranhão
- São João do Paraíso, Minas Gerais
- São João da Paraúna, Goiás
- São João dos Patos, Maranhão
- São João do Pau d'Alho, São Paulo
- São João do Piauí, Piauí
- São João de Pirabas, Pará
- São João do Polêsine, Rio Grande do Sul
- São João da Ponta, Pará
- São João da Ponte, Minas Gerais
- São João do Rio do Peixe, Minas Gerais
- São João do Sabugi, Paraíba
- São João da Serra, Rio Grande do Norte
- São João do Soter, Maranhão
- São João do Sul, Santa Catarina
- São João do Tigre, Paraíba
- São João do Triunfo, Paraíba
- São João da Urtiga, Rio Grande do Sul
- São João da Varjota, Piauí

=== China ===
- São João Island, an island in the province of Guangdong

=== Portugal ===
- São João (Abrantes), a parish in the municipality of Abrantes
- São João (Lisbon), a parish in the municipality of Lisbon
- São João (Ovar), a parish in the municipality of Ovar
- São João da Boa Vista (Tábua), a civil parish in the municipality of Tábua
- São João da Serra, a parish in the municipality of Oliveira de Frades
- São João da Madeira, a municipality in the district of Aveiro
- São João (Lajes do Pico), a civil parish in the municipality of Lajes do Pico, Pico, Azores

=== India ===
- San João (Goa)

== See also ==
- São João Batista (disambiguation)
