= Fort St. John =

Fort St. John may refer to:

- Fort St. John, British Columbia, a city in British Columbia, Canada
- Spanish Fort (New Orleans), also known as Fort St. John, a historic place in New Orleans, Louisiana, United States
- Fort St. John Group, a stratigraphical unit of the Western Canadian Sedimentary Basin

== See also ==
- Fort Saint-Jean (disambiguation)
- Fort San Juan (disambiguation)
- Forte de São João (disambiguation)
- Port St. John, Florida
