= Ponto Chique =

Municipality in Minas Gerais, Brazil

Coordinates: 16°37′55″S 45°04′00″W

- Municipality
- Interactive map of Ponto Chique
- Country: Brazil
- State: Minas Gerais
- Region: Southeast
- Time zone: UTC−3 (BRT)

Location of Ponto Chique in the state of Minas Gerais

Ponto Chique is a municipality in the north of the Brazilian state of Minas Gerais. As of 2020, the population was 4,283 in a total area of 602 km^{2}. It became a municipality in 1997.

== Geography ==
Ponto Chique is located at an elevation of 476 meters on the right bank of the São Francisco River. It is connected by poor roads to Coração de Jesus. It belongs to the statistical microregion of Montes Claros. Neighboring municipalities are Ubaí, Ibiaí, Campo Azul, Buritizeiro, Coração de Jesus, Santa Fé de Minas and São Romão.

Distances

- Belo Horizonte: 459 km.
- Cachoeira do Manteiga: 11 km.
- Coração de Jesus: 72 km.

== Economic activities ==
The most important economic activities are cattle raising, commerce, and subsistence agriculture. The GDP in 2005 was R$15,774,000. Ponto Chique is in the bottom tier of municipalities in the state with regard to economic and social development. It suffers from isolation, poor soils, and periodic drought. As of 2007 there were no banking agencies in the town. There was a small retail commerce serving the surrounding area of cattle and agricultural lands. In the rural area there were 240 establishments employing about 700 workers. Only 35 of the farms had tractors. There were 31 automobiles in all of the municipality. There were 33,000 head of cattle in 2006. The crops with a planted area of more than 100 hectares were beans, sugarcane, manioc, and corn.

== Health and education ==
In the health sector there were 02 clinics and no hospitals. In the educational sector there were 03 primary schools and 01 middle school.

- Municipal Human Development Index: 0.660 (2000)
- State ranking: 711 out of 853 municipalities as of 2000
- National ranking: 3,608 out of 5,138 municipalities as of 2000

The highest ranking municipality in Minas Gerais in 2000 was Poços de Caldas with 0.841, while the lowest was Setubinha with 0.568. Nationally the highest was São Caetano do Sul in São Paulo with 0.919, while the lowest was Setubinha. In more recent statistics (considering 5,507 municipalities) Manari in the state of Pernambuco has the lowest rating in the country—0,467—putting it in last place.

== See also ==
- List of municipalities in Minas Gerais
