= Patis =

Patis may refer to:

- Paattinen, a Finnish village
- Patis, Minas Gerais, a municipality in the Brazilian state of Minas Gerais
- Paṭis, a standard abbreviation for the Buddhist Pali Canon's Patisambhidamagga
- Patis (sauce), a fish sauce used as a cooking ingredient or a condiment in the Philippines
- Patis (plant) Ohwi (1942), a grass genus in the tribe Stipeae, commonly known as ricegrass
