= Lagoa dos Patos, Minas Gerais =

Brazilian municipality in Minas Gerais

Coordinates: 16°59′01″S 44°34′15″W

- Municipality
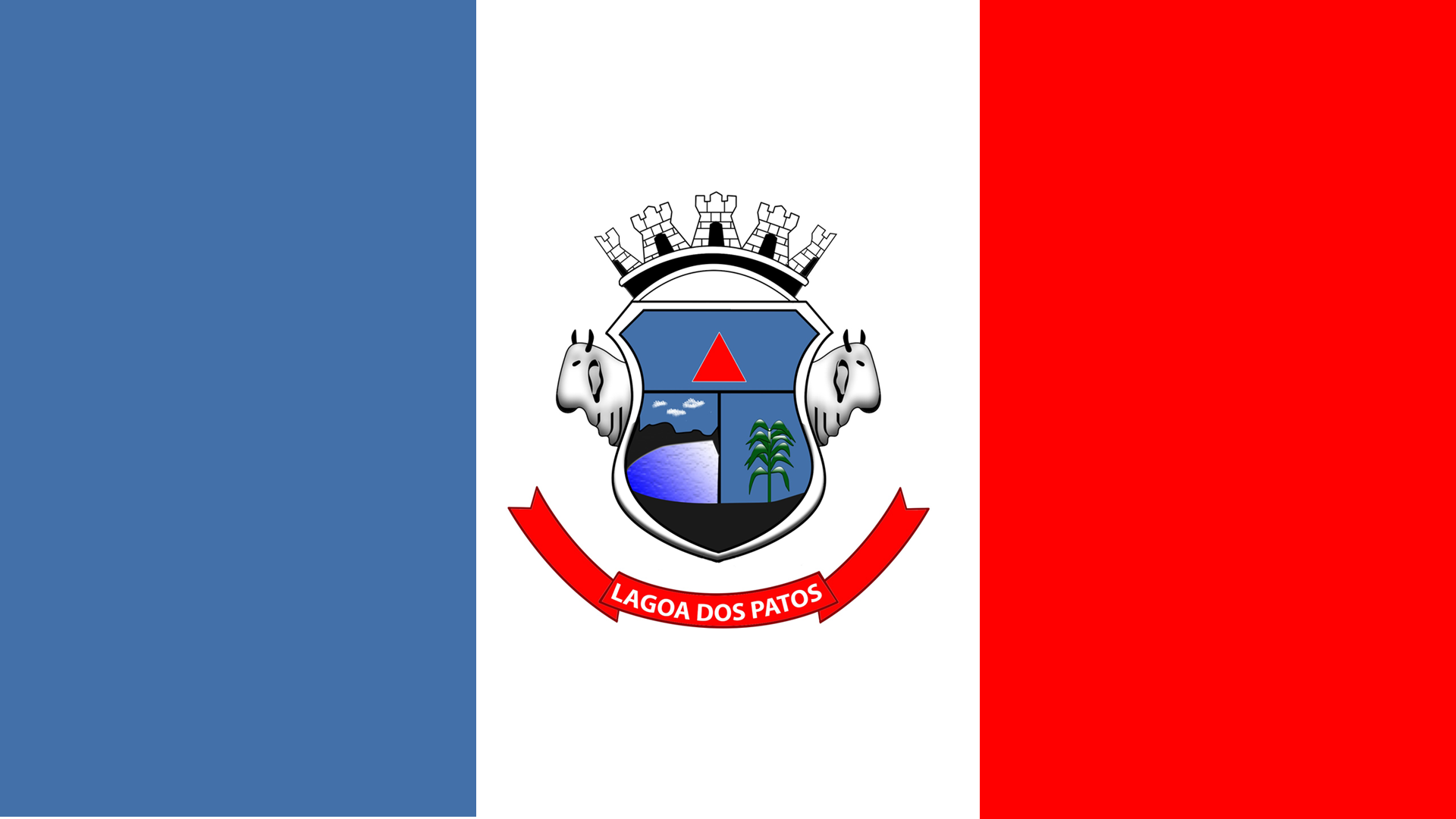
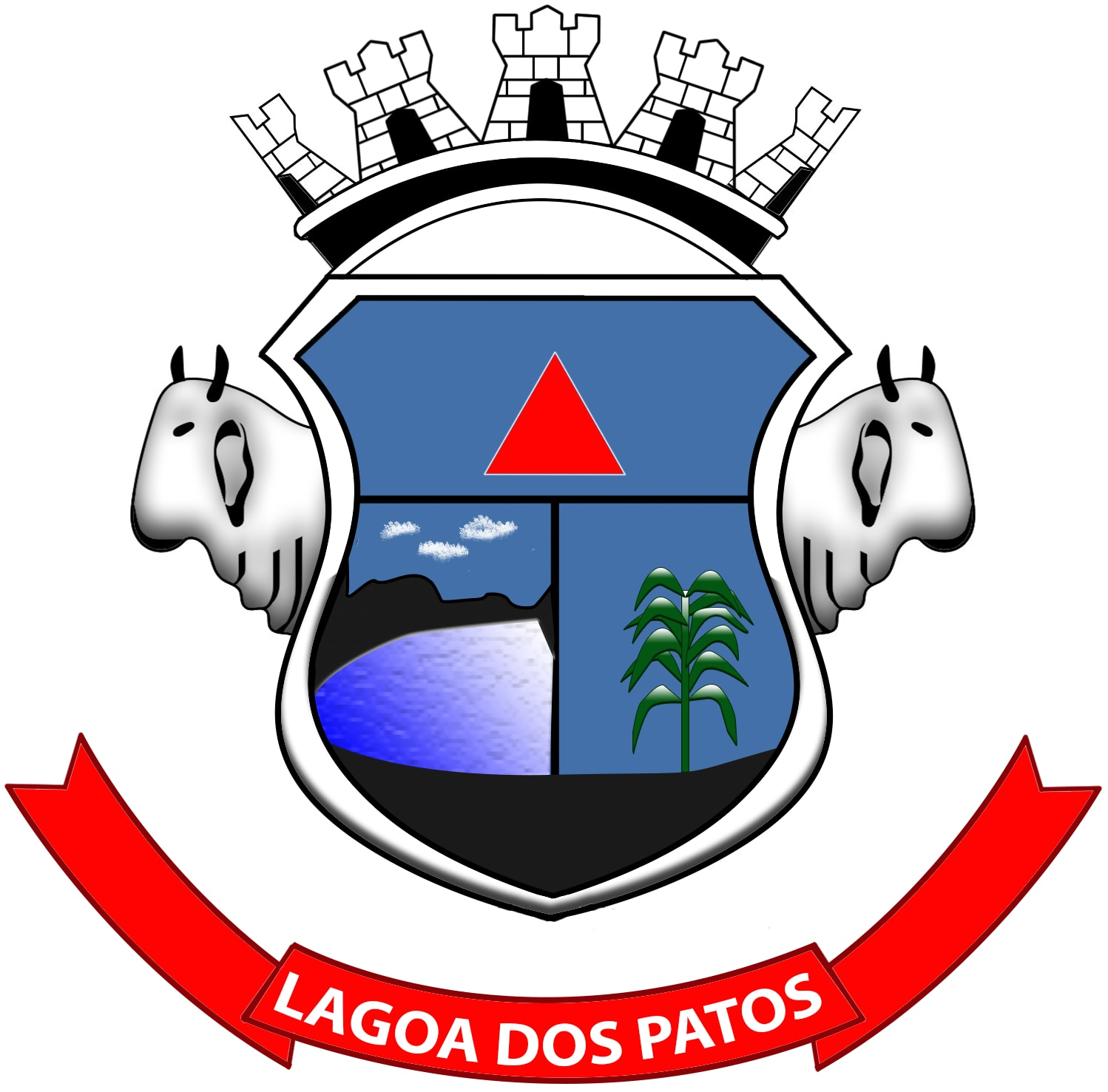
- Flag Coat of arms
- Interactive map of Lagoa dos Patos, Minas Gerais
- Country: Brazil
- State: Minas Gerais
- Region: Southeast
- Time zone: UTC−3 (BRT)

Location of Lagoa dos Patos within the state of Minas Gerais

Lagoa dos Patos is a Brazilian municipality located in the north of the state of Minas Gerais. In 2020 the population was 4,082 in a total area of 599 km^{2}. It became a municipality in 1962.

Lagoa dos Patos is located about 20 km. east of the São Francisco River. It is 68 km. from the nearest major population center, Pirapora at an elevation of 690 meters. Neighboring municipalities are: Jequitaí, Várzea da Palma, Buritizeiro, Ibiaí, and Coração de Jesus. Lagoa dos Patos is part of the statistical microregion of Pirapora.

The most important economic activities are cattle raising and subsistence farming. The GDP in 2005 was R$14,041,000.00. There were no banking agencies in the town in 2007, while there were 81 automobiles, one of the lowest ratios in the state. In the rural area there were 248 establishments on a total area of 41,000 hectares, of which 4,000 hectares were planted in crops. Around 900 people were working in agriculture. There were 23,000 head of cattle. The main crops were rice, beans, and corn.

- Municipal Human Development Index: 0.657 (2000)
- State ranking: 720 out of 853 municipalities as of 2000
- National ranking: 3,647 out of 5,138 municipalities as of 2000

The highest ranking municipality in Minas Gerais in 2000 was Poços de Caldas with 0.841, while the lowest was Setubinha with 0.568. Nationally the highest was São Caetano do Sul in São Paulo with 0.919, while the lowest was Setubinha.

In 2005 there were 03 health clinics and no hospitals.

== See also ==
- List of municipalities in Minas Gerais
