= Ubaí =

Municipality in the north of the Brazilian state of Minas Gerais

Coordinates: 16°17′S 44°47′W

- Municipality
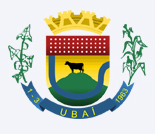
- Flag Coat of arms
- Interactive map of Ubaí
- Country: Brazil
- State: Minas Gerais
- Region: Southeast
- Time zone: UTC−3 (BRT)

Location of Ubaí in the state of Minas Gerais

Ubaí is a municipality in the north of the Brazilian state of Minas Gerais. As of 2020 the population was 12,599 in a total area of 821 km^{2}. It became a municipality in 1962.

== Geography ==
Ubaí is located at an elevation of 608 meters between the São Francisco River and Brasília de Minas. It is connected by state highway (partially paved) to São Romão on the São Francisco River. It belongs to the statistical microregion of Montes Claros. Neighboring municipalities are Ponto Chique, São Romão, Campo Azul, Luislândia and Icaraí de Minas. The Rio Gameleiras crosses the south of the municipal area.

Distances

- Belo Horizonte: 568 km.
- Montes Claros: 140 km.
- Brasília de Minas: 52 km.

== Economic activities ==
The most important economic activities are cattle raising, commerce, and subsistence agriculture. The GDP in 2005 was R$ 29,109,000. Ubaí is in the bottom tier of municipalities in the state with regard to economic and social development. It suffers from isolation, poor soils, and periodic drought. As of 2007 there was 01 banking agency in the town. There was a small retail commerce serving the surrounding area of cattle and agricultural lands. In the rural area there were 858 establishments employing about 2,500 workers. Only 37 of the farms had tractors. There were 101 automobiles in all of the municipality. There were 35,000 head of cattle in 2006. The crops with a planted area of more than 100 hectares were beans, sugarcane, manioc, and corn.

== Health and education ==
In the health sector there were 09 clinics and no hospitals. In the educational sector there were 21 primary schools and 02 middle schools.

- Municipal Human Development Index: 0.651 (2000)
- State ranking: 741 out of 853 municipalities as of 2000
- National ranking: 3,764 out of 5,138 municipalities as of 2000

The highest ranking municipality in Minas Gerais in 2000 was Poços de Caldas with 0.841, while the lowest was Setubinha with 0.568. Nationally the highest was São Caetano do Sul in São Paulo with 0.919, while the lowest was Setubinha. In more recent statistics (considering 5,507 municipalities) Manari in the state of Pernambuco has the lowest rating in the country—0,467—putting it in last place.

- Literacy rate: 74%
- Life expectancy: 73.8 (average of males and females)
- Urbanization rate: 42.89%
- Percentage of urban houses connected to sewage system:
- Infant mortality rate: n/a

== See also ==
- List of municipalities in Minas Gerais
