= São João da Lagoa =

Brazilian municipality

Coordinates: 16°51′17″S 44°20′53″W

- Municipality
- Interactive map of São João da Lagoa
- Country: Brazil
- State: Minas Gerais
- Region: Southeast
- Time zone: UTC−3 (BRT)

Location of São João da Lagoa in the state of Minas Gerais

São João da Lagoa is a municipality in the north of the Brazilian state of Minas Gerais. As of 2020 the population was 4,932 in a total area of 990 km^{2}. It became a municipality in 1995.

== Geography ==
São João da Lagoa is located at an elevation of 835 meters between the São Francisco River and Montes Claros. It is connected by state highway (partially paved) to Coração de Jesus. It belongs to the statistical microregion of Montes Claros. Neighboring municipalities are Coração de Jesus, Claro dos Poções, Ibiaí and Lagoa dos Patos.

Distances

- Belo Horizonte: 479 km.
- Montes Claros: 67 km.
- Coração de Jesus: 24 km.

== Economic activities ==
The most important economic activities are cattle raising, commerce, and subsistence agriculture. The GDP in 2005 was R$14,576,000. São João da Lagoa is in the bottom tier of municipalities in the state with regard to economic and social development. It suffers from isolation, poor soils, and periodic drought. As of 2007 there were no banking agencies in the town. There was a small retail commerce serving the surrounding area of cattle and agricultural lands. In the rural area there were 818 establishments employing about 1,500 workers. Only 59 of the farms had tractors. There were 117 automobiles in all of the municipality. There were 28,000 head of cattle in 2006. The crops with a planted area of more than 100 hectares were beans, sugarcane, manioc, and corn.

== Health and education ==
In the health sector there were 02 clinics and no hospitals. In the educational sector there were 03 primary schools and 01 middle school.

- Municipal Human Development Index: 0.673 (2000)
- State ranking: 665 out of 853 municipalities as of 2000
- National ranking: 3,417 out of 5,138 municipalities as of 2000

The highest ranking municipality in Minas Gerais in 2000 was Poços de Caldas with 0.841, while the lowest was Setubinha with 0.568. Nationally the highest was São Caetano do Sul in São Paulo with 0.919, while the lowest was Setubinha. In more recent statistics (considering 5,507 municipalities) Manari in the state of Pernambuco has the lowest rating in the country—0,467—putting it in last place.

== See also ==
- List of municipalities in Minas Gerais
