= Mirabela =

Municipality in the north of the Brazilian state of Minas Gerais

Coordinates: 16°15′46″S 44°09′50″W

- Municipality
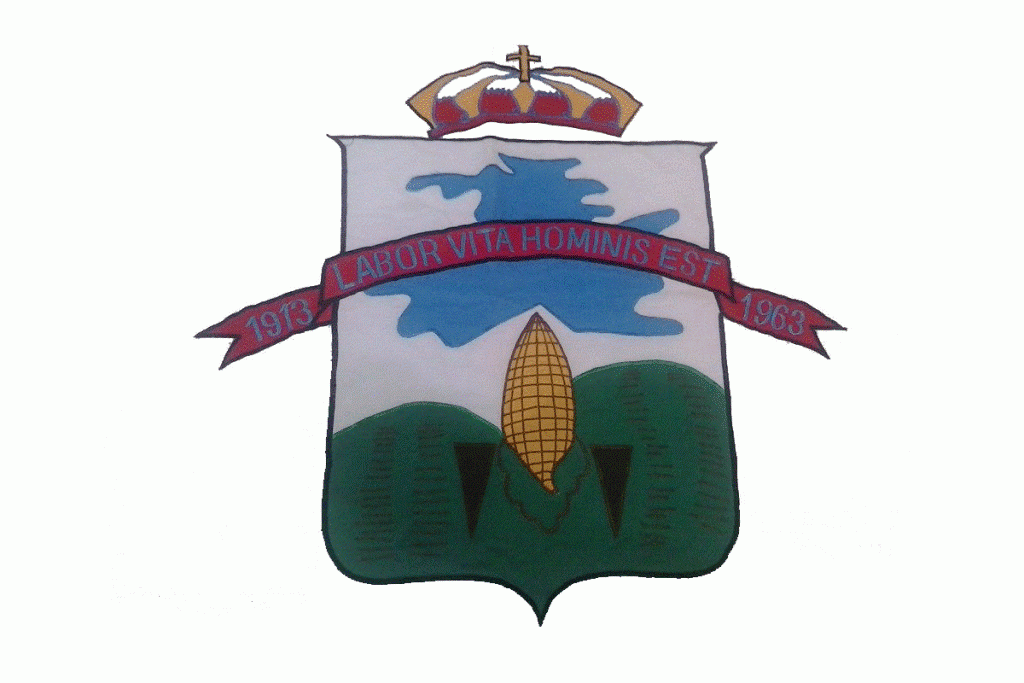
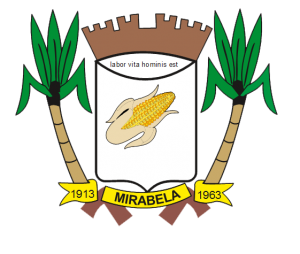
- Flag Coat of arms
- Interactive map of Mirabela
- Country: Brazil
- State: Minas Gerais
- Region: Southeast
- Time zone: UTC−3 (BRT)

Location of Mirabela in the state of Minas Gerais

Mirabela is a municipality in the north of the Brazilian state of Minas Gerais. As of 2020 the population was 13,620 in a total area of 721 km^{2}. It became a municipality in 1962.

== Geography ==
Mirabela is located at an elevation of 800 meters, 64 km. northwest of the regional center of Montes Claros. It is on highway BR-135, which connects Montes Claros to Januária. It belongs to the statistical microregion of Montes Claros. Neighboring municipalities are Brasília de Minas, Japonvar, Patis, Coração de Jesus, and Montes Claros.

Distances

- Belo Horizonte: 483 km.
- Patis: 25 km.
- Brasília de Minas: 38 km.

== Economic activities ==
The most important economic activities are cattle raising, commerce, and subsistence agriculture. The GDP in 2005 was R$ 33,947,000. Mirabela is in the bottom tier of municipalities in the state with regard to economic and social development. It suffers from isolation, poor soils, and periodic drought. As of 2007 there was 1 banking agency in the town. There was a small retail commerce serving the surrounding area of cattle and agricultural lands. In the rural area there were 814 establishments employing about 2,000 workers. Only 50 of the farms had tractors. There were 550 automobiles in all of the municipality. There were 19,500 head of cattle in 2006. The crops with a planted area of more than 100 hectares were beans, sugarcane, manioc, and corn.

== Health and education ==
In the health sector there were 16 clinics and 01 hospital with 17 beds. In the educational sector there were 12 primary schools and 01 middle school.

- Municipal Human Development Index: 0.658 (2000)
- State ranking: 717 out of 853 municipalities as of 2000
- National ranking: 3,633 out of 5,138 municipalities as of 2000
- Literacy rate: 74%
- Life expectancy: 67 (average of males and females)
- Percentage of population in urban area: 75.49 (2000)
- Percentage of urban houses served by sewage system: 2.90
- Infant mortality rate: n/a

The highest ranking municipality in Minas Gerais in 2000 was Poços de Caldas with 0.841, while the lowest was Setubinha with 0.568. Nationally the highest was São Caetano do Sul in São Paulo with 0.919, while the lowest was Setubinha. In more recent statistics (considering 5,507 municipalities) Manari in the state of Pernambuco has the lowest rating in the country—0.467—putting it in last place.

== See also ==
- List of municipalities in Minas Gerais
