= Riachinho =

Brazilian municipality located in the north of the state of Minas Gerais

Coordinates: 16°13′48″S 46°59′31″W

- Municipality
- Interactive map of Riachinho
- Country: Brazil
- State: Minas Gerais
- Region: Southeast
- Time zone: UTC−3 (BRT)

Location of Riachinho within the state of Minas Gerais

Riachinho is a Brazilian municipality located in the north of the state of Minas Gerais. In 2020 the population was 8,134 in a total area of 1,775 km^{2} (685 sq mi). It became a municipality in 1992.

== Geography ==
Riachinho is located on state highway MG-191 (dirt) at an elevation of 550 meters. It is 62 km. south of the nearest population center with services, Arinos. The municipality is crossed by the Rio Urucuia, a tributary of the São Francisco River. Neighboring municipalities are: Santa Fé de Minas, Várzea da Palma, Uruana de Minas, and Bonfinópolis de Minas. Riachinho is part of the statistical microregion of Pirapora.

== Economy ==
The most important economic activities are cattle raising and agriculture. The GDP in 2005 was R$ 33,831,903,000. There was one banking agency in the town in 2007, while there were 311 automobiles. In the rural area there were 842 establishments on a total area of 124,000 hectares, of which 9,000 hectares were planted in crops. Around 1,000 people were working in agriculture. There were 51,000 head of cattle. The main crops were rice, beans, corn, soybeans, and sorghum.

== Health and education ==
This municipality is isolated from major population centers and suffers from drought and poor soils.

- Municipal Human Development Index: 0.700 (2000)
- State ranking: 540 out of 853 municipalities as of 2000
- National ranking: 2,993 out of 5,138 municipalities as of 2000

The highest ranking municipality in Minas Gerais in 2000 was Poços de Caldas with 0.841, while the lowest was Setubinha with 0.568. Nationally the highest was São Caetano do Sul in São Paulo with 0.919, while the lowest was Setubinha.

== See also ==
- List of municipalities in Minas Gerais
