= Ibiaí =

Municipality in Minas Gerais, Brazil

Coordinates: 16°51′39″S 44°54′50″W

- Municipality
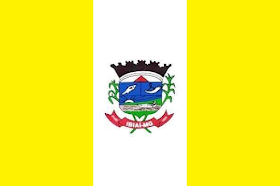
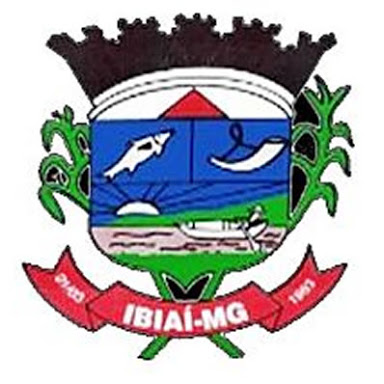
- Flag Coat of arms
- Interactive map of Ibiaí
- Country: Brazil
- State: Minas Gerais
- Region: Southeast
- Time zone: UTC−3 (BRT)

Location of Ibiaí within the state of Minas Gerais

Ibiaí is a Brazilian municipality located in the north of the state of Minas Gerais. In 2020 the population was 8,437 in a total area of 870 km^{2} (340 sq mi). It became a municipality in 1963.

== Geography ==
Ibiaí is located on the right bank of the São Francisco River at an elevation of 470 meters, 72 km. north of Pirapora. Neighboring municipalities are: Buritizeiro, Lagoa dos Patos, Ponto Chique, and Coração de Jesus.

Ibiaí is part of the statistical microregion of Pirapora.

== Economic activities ==
The most important economic activities are cattle raising (37,000 head in 2006) and agriculture. The GDP in 2005 was R$24,287,000. The most important agricultural crops are rice, sugarcane, beans and corn. There were 190 automobiles. In the rural area there were 296 producers. The total area of agricultural land was 128,000 hectares in 2006, of which 36,000 ha. were planted in crops. As of 2006 there were 58 tractors. In the urban area there was one banking agency in 2006.

== Health and education ==
This municipality is isolated from major population centers and suffers from drought and poor soils.

- Municipal Human Development Index: .687 (2000)
- State ranking: 603 out of 853 municipalities as of 2000
- National ranking: 3,209 out of 5,138 municipalities as of 2000

The highest ranking municipality in Minas Gerais in 2000 was Poços de Caldas with 0.841, while the lowest was Setubinha with 0.568. Nationally the highest was São Caetano do Sul in São Paulo with 0.919, while the lowest was Setubinha.

- Degree of urbanization: 70.90% (2000)
- Infant mortality rate: 22.22 (2000) The rate for Minas Gerais was 17.40; the rate for Brazil was 18.91.
- Illiteracy rate: 24.56% (15 years old or older)(Data from 2000) The rate for Minas Gerais was 11.96; the rate for Brazil was 13.63
- Urban area covered by sewage system: 1.20%--the rate for Minas Gerais was 81.39%
- Health centers and hospitals: 03 health centers. There were no hospitals. The nearest hospital was in Pirapora.

== See also ==
- List of municipalities in Minas Gerais
