= Coração de Jesus =

- Municipality
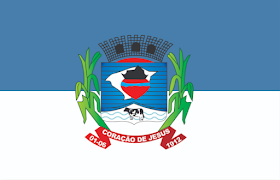
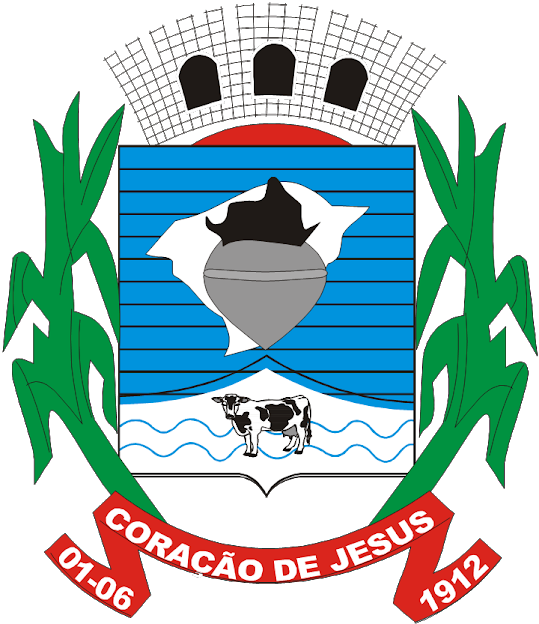
- Flag Coat of arms

- Location of Coração de Jesus within the state of Minas Gerais

- Location in Brazil
- Coordinates: 16°41′06″S 44°21′54″W
- Country: Brazil
- State: Minas Gerais

Population (2020)
  - Total: 26,611
- Time zone: UTC−3 (BRT)

Coração de Jesus is a Brazilian municipality located in the north of the state of Minas Gerais. In 2020 the population was 26,611 in a total area of 2,236 km^{2}. It became a municipality in 1912.

== Geography ==
Coração de Jesus is located between the São Francisco River and Montes Claros. It is 56 km. from Montes Claros and 62 km. from Ibiaí on the São Francisco River. It is 22 km. from federal highway BR-365, linked by a paved road. The elevation of the municipal seat is 760 meters. The distance to Belo Horizonte is 475 km. Neighboring municipalities are: Ponto Chique, Campo Azul, São João do Pacuí, Brasília de Minas, Mirabela, Montes Claros, São João da Lagoa, Lagoa dos Patos, and Ibiaí. Coração de Jesus is part of the statistical microregion of Montes Claros.

== Economy ==
The most important economic activities are cattle raising, commerce, small and medium transformation industries, and agriculture. The GDP in 2005 was R$74,394,000. Coração de Jesus is in the bottom tier of municipalities in the state with regard to economic and social development. It suffers from isolation, poor soils, and periodic drought. As of 2007 there was one banking agency in the town. There was a small retail commerce serving the surrounding area of cattle and agricultural lands. In the rural area there were 2,027 establishments employing about 7,500 workers. Only 104 of the farms had tractors. There were 780 automobiles in all of the municipality. There were 65,000 head of cattle in 2006. The crops with a planted area of more than 1,000 hectares were sugarcane, beans, and corn.

== Health and education ==
- Municipal Human Development Index: 0.687 (2000)
- State ranking: 600 out of 853 municipalities as of 2000
- National ranking: 3,202 out of 5,138 municipalities as of 2000
- Literacy rate: 76%
- Life expectancy: 69 (average of males and females)

The highest ranking municipality in Minas Gerais in 2000 was Poços de Caldas with 0.841, while the lowest was Setubinha with 0.568. Nationally the highest was São Caetano do Sul in São Paulo with 0.919, while the lowest was Setubinha.

In the health sector there were 13 clinics and 02 hospitals with 115 beds. In the educational sector there were 13 primary schools and 6 middle schools.

== History ==
The area was first penetrated by the Portuguese bandeirantes led by Paes Leme. The first settlement was called Arraial do Sagrado Coração de Jesus. In 1774, Francisco Ferreira Leal donated the lands that would form the new town. In 1792, the church called Capela do Sagrado Coração de Jesus was built.

In 1832 the "arraial" was raised to the category of district. The extraction of rubber attracted many settlers and the town grew quickly. In 1839 the name was changed to Coração de Bom Jesus. In 1911 it separated from Montes Claros and changed its name to Inconfidência, changing back again in 1928 to the present Coração de Jesus.

== See also ==
- List of municipalities in Minas Gerais

16°41′06″S 44°21′54″W
