= Lassance =

Municipality in Minas Gerais, Brazil

Coordinates: 17°53′13″S 44°34′40″W

- Municipality
- Interactive map of Lassance
- Country: Brazil
- State: Minas Gerais
- Region: Southeast
- Time zone: UTC−3 (BRT)

Location of Lassance within the state of Minas Gerais

Lassance is a Brazilian municipality located in the north of the state of Minas Gerais. In 2020 the population was 6,503 in a total area of 3,213 km^{2} (1,241 sq mi). It became a municipality in 1953.

== Geography ==
Lassance is located on federal highway BR-496 at an elevation of 504 meters. It is south of the nearest population center, Pirapora and north of Corinto. The municipality is crossed by the Rio das Velhas, a tributary of the São Francisco River. Neighboring municipalities are: Buritizeiro, Várzea da Palma, Buenópolis, and Confria. Lassance is part of the statistical microregion of Pirapora. It is 263 km. from the state capital of Belo Horizonte.

== Economy ==
The most important economic activities are cattle raising (35,000 head in 2006), mining, industry, and agriculture. The GDP in 2005 was R$ 36,064,000. The most important agricultural crops are bananas, papaya, mangoes, rice, sugarcane, manioc, beans and corn. There were 247 automobiles. In the rural area there were 450 producers. The total area of agricultural land was 88,000 hectares in 2006, of which 4,500 ha. were planted in crops. As of 2006 there were 124 tractors. In the urban area there were no banking agencies in 2006.

== Health and education ==
This municipality is isolated from major population centers and suffers from drought and poor soils.

- Municipal Human Development Index: 0.681 (2000)
- State ranking: 630 out of 853 municipalities as of 2000
- National ranking: 3,283 out of 5,138 municipalities as of 2000

The highest ranking municipality in Minas Gerais in 2000 was Poços de Caldas with 0.841, while the lowest was Setubinha with 0.568. Nationally the highest was São Caetano do Sul in São Paulo with 0.919, while the lowest was Setubinha.

- Degree of urbanization: 49.97% (2000) The rate for Minas Gerais was 82%
- Infant mortality rate: 28.57 (2000) The rate for Minas Gerais was 17.40; the rate for Brazil was 18.91.
- Illiteracy rate: 21.02% (15 years old or older)(Data from 2000) The rate for Minas Gerais was 11.96; the rate for Brazil was 13.63
- Urban area covered by sewage system: 0.40%--the rate for Minas Gerais was 81.39%
- Health centers and hospitals: 04 health centers. There were no hospitals. The nearest large hospital was in Pirapora.

== See also ==
- List of municipalities in Minas Gerais
