= Pirapora =

Municipality in Minas Gerais, Brazil

- Municipality
- Municipality of Pirapora
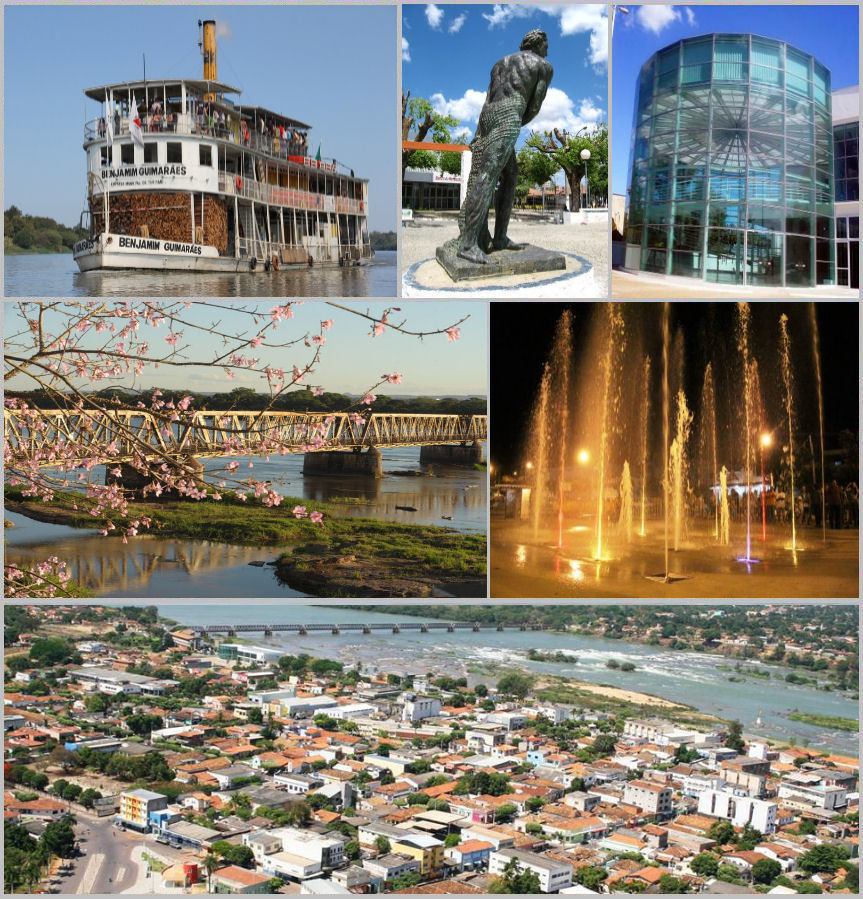
- Montage of Pirapora

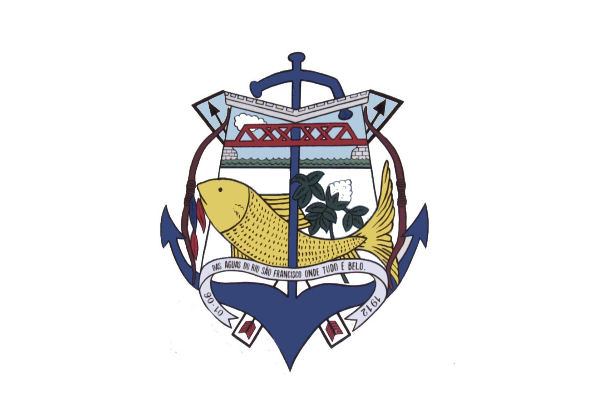
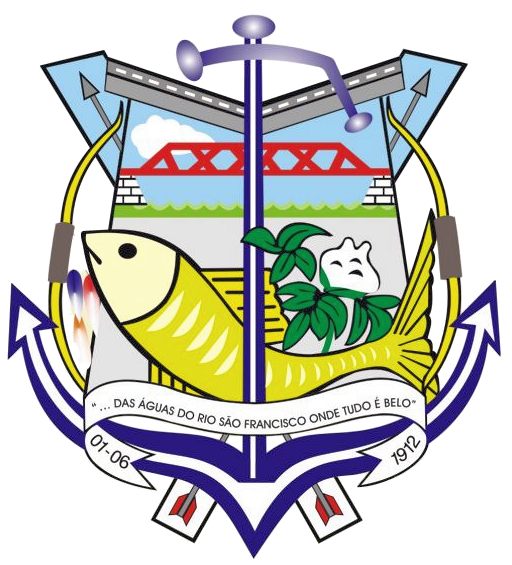
- Flag Coat of arms

- Location in Minas Gerais

- Location in Minas Gerais Location in Brazil
- Coordinates: 17°20′42″S 44°56′31″W
- Country: Brazil
- Region: Southeast
- State: Minas Gerais
- Intermediate region: Montes Claros
- Immediate region: Pirapora
- Municipality established: June 1, 1912

Government
  - Mayor: Alexandro Costa César (União Brasil)

Area
  - Total: 549.514 km^{2} (212.169 sq mi)
- Elevation: 472 m (1,549 ft)

Population (2022 census)
  - Total: 55,606
  - Estimate (2025): 57,713
  - Density: 101.19/km^{2} (262.08/sq mi)
- Demonym: piraporense
- Time zone: UTC−3 (BRT)
- Area code: 38
- HDI (2010): 0.731 (high)
- GDP per capita (2023): R$60,447.78
- Website: www.pirapora.mg.gov.br

Pirapora is a municipality in northcentral Minas Gerais in Brazil. It had a population of 55,606 in the 2022 census, with an estimated population of 57,713 in 2025, in an area of 549.514 km^{2} (212.169 sq mi). The name Pirapora comes from the Tupi words for "fish" + "jump", referring to the piracema season when a mass migration of fishes ascends the São Francisco River to spawn.

== Location ==
Pirapora belongs to its own statistical microregion. The elevation of the municipal seat is 472 meters. It became a municipality in 1912. This municipality is located on the right bank of the São Francisco River and is 340 km from the state capital.

Neighboring municipalities are: Lagoa Grande, Coromandel, Guarda-Mor, Lagamar and Paracatu. There are two districts, besides the municipal seat: Claro de Minas, 12 km. distant, and Vazamor, 32 km. distant.

== Microregion of Pirapora ==
The statistical microregion of Pirapora includes 9 cities: Buritizeiro, Várzea da Palma, Ibiaí, Jequitaí, São Romão, Lassance, Riachinho, Santa Fé de Minas and Lagoa dos Patos. It has an area of 23,111 km2 and a population of approximately 150,000 inhabitants.

== History ==
The city is located on the right bank of the great São Francisco River, the longest river to flow entirely inside Brazilian territory. Its history goes back to the colonial period of the bandeirantes and the gold panhandlers who followed the river upstream, arrived at the rapids of Pirapora and founded the settlement of São Gonçalo das Tabocas. In 1911 the small Arraial de São Gonçalo de Pirapora became the seat of a municipality and its name was shortened to Pirapora. Its street plan was laid out in the form of a chess set, inspired by the new capital of Belo Horizonte, and the streets were given names of Brazilian states.

There are highway connections with the main federal highway, the BR 040, to the west. In 1910 the railroad came up from the south and reached Pirapora, with a bridge (694 m) being built across the river. There were plans to extend the line to the coast. At the end of the nineteen seventies the line was deactivated, but the bridge and the rails still remain.

Today the river has lost its economic importance and is mainly used by tourist boats that attempt to recreate the spirit of the past, when Mississippi style riverboats were used to go as far as Juazeiro in Bahia. These boats used charcoal, which contributed to the disappearance of the vegetation along the river. One of the old paddle wheel steamboats, the Benjamim Guimarães, can still be seen anchored in front of the city and is a major tourist site.

== Economy ==
The main economic activities are industry, cattle raising, farming (both extensive mechanized and subsistence), goods and services, and tourism. The GDP for 2005 was R$662,985,000. In the rural area there were 605 farms and a total agricultural area of 57,000 hectares, of which 38,000 ha. were planted, 14,000 were in natural pasture, and 13,000 ha. were in woodland or forest. 2,800 people were dependent on farming. 107 of the farms had tractors. In 2006 there were 9,600 head of cattle. With irrigation Pirapora has become a major producer of tropical fruits, growing eating grapes, papaya, mangoes, cantaloupe, and guava. There is also production on a smaller scale of corn, beans, rice, manioc, tomatoes, lettuce, and bananas.

According to the city government site, Pirapora is the second most important city in the north of Minas, after Montes Claros, in industrial output. There is an industrial park where several small and medium industries are installed. Iron silicon, metallic silicon, and textiles are produced.

== Health and education ==
In 2005 there were 39 health establishments—25 public and 14 private. There was 01 public hospital and 02 private hospitals. The number of hospital beds was 133. The Centro Regional de Saúde da Visão is a public clinic that specializes in eye surgery and attracts patients from all over the north of Minas Gerais.

In 2007 there were three institutes of higher learning in the city: Instituto Educacional Santo Agostinho (private), União de Ensino de Minas Gerais Ltda (private), and UNIMONTES-Universidade Estadual de Montes Claros (public).

Pirapora had a Municipal Human Development Index of 0.731 in 2010.

== Climate ==
Climate data for Pirapora (1991–2020)
| Month | Jan | Feb | Mar | Apr | May | Jun | Jul | Aug | Sep | Oct | Nov | Dec | Year |
|---|---|---|---|---|---|---|---|---|---|---|---|---|---|
| Mean daily maximum °C (°F) | 31.5 (88.7) | 32.4 (90.3) | 31.8 (89.2) | 31.5 (88.7) | 30.3 (86.5) | 29.6 (85.3) | 29.8 (85.6) | 31.3 (88.3) | 33.3 (91.9) | 33.9 (93.0) | 31.8 (89.2) | 31.2 (88.2) | 31.5 (88.7) |
| Mean daily minimum °C (°F) | 21.3 (70.3) | 21.3 (70.3) | 21.1 (70.0) | 19.7 (67.5) | 16.8 (62.2) | 14.4 (57.9) | 14.0 (57.2) | 15.7 (60.3) | 19.1 (66.4) | 21.4 (70.5) | 21.3 (70.3) | 21.3 (70.3) | 19.0 (66.2) |
| Average precipitation mm (inches) | 189.1 (7.44) | 103.5 (4.07) | 143.5 (5.65) | 43.6 (1.72) | 11.9 (0.47) | 2.7 (0.11) | 0.9 (0.04) | 5.1 (0.20) | 17.6 (0.69) | 69.5 (2.74) | 227.0 (8.94) | 236.4 (9.31) | 1,050.8 (41.37) |
Source: Instituto Nacional de Meteorologia

== See also ==
- List of municipalities in Minas Gerais
- Pirapora do Bom Jesus, a municipality and pilgrimage center in São Paulo (state)
