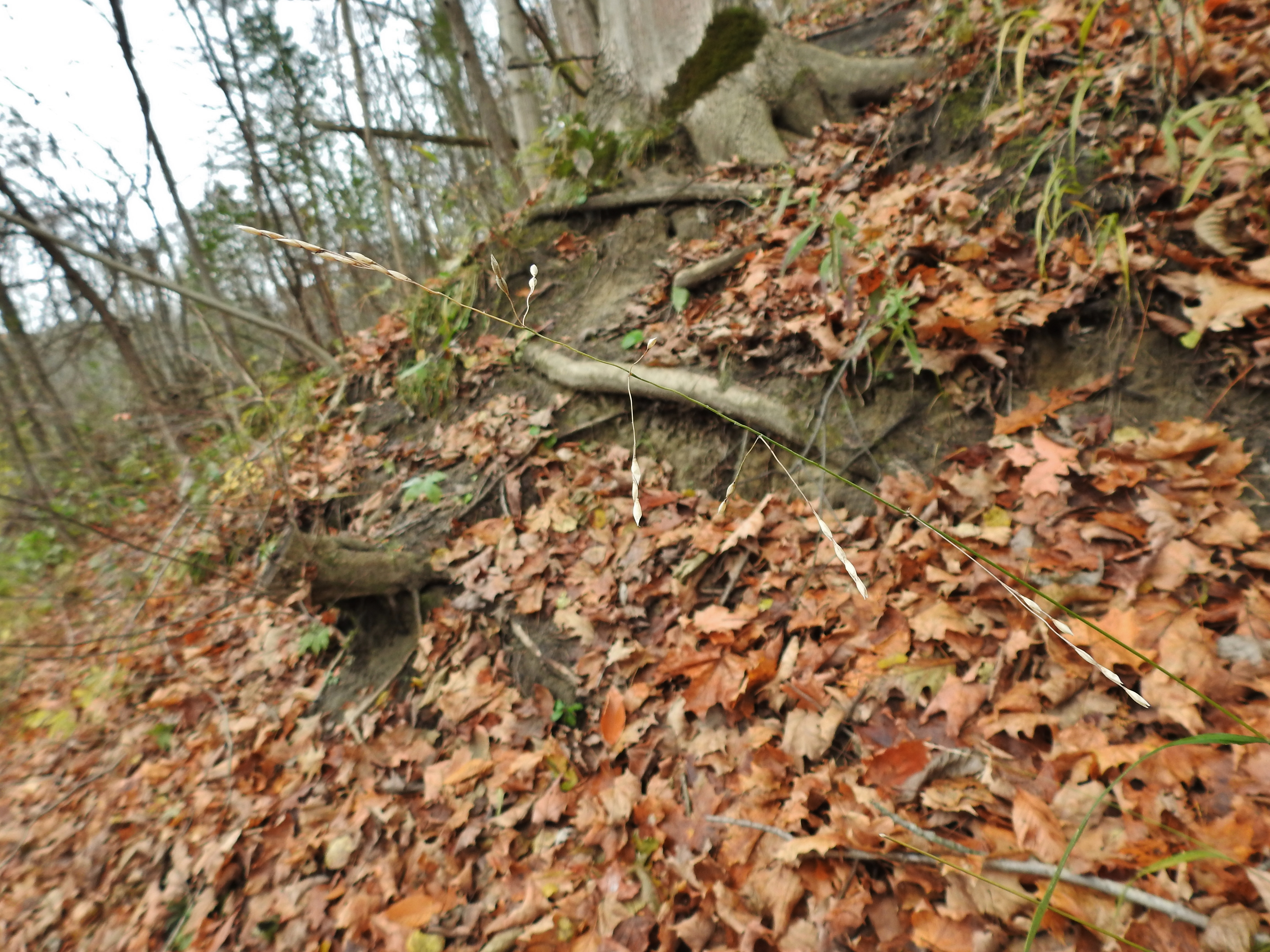
- Piptatherum racemosum in Ontario, Canada.

Scientific classification
- Kingdom: Plantae
- Clade: Tracheophytes
- Clade: Angiosperms
- Clade: Monocots
- Clade: Commelinids
- Order: Poales
- Family: Poaceae
- Subfamily: Pooideae
- Genus: Piptatherum
- Species: P. racemosum

Binomial name
- Piptatherum racemosum (Sm.) Eaton

Synonyms
- Oryzopsis racemosa; Patis racemosa

= Piptatherum racemosum =

Species of plant

Piptatherum racemosum, commonly called black-fruited mountain ricegrass or simply mountain ricegrass, is a species of grass native to the northeastern United States and southeastern Canada.

Piptatherum racemosum is a conspicuous and easily identifiable grass with broad, shiny cauline leaves and large, long-awned spikelets. It grows in dry or mesic forests and woodlands.

== Taxonomy ==
This species has a complicated taxonomic history, having been placed in various genera, most frequently Oryzopsis and Patis. The name Piptatherum racemosum is currently accepted by the Flora of North America committee, among other authorities.

== Gallery ==
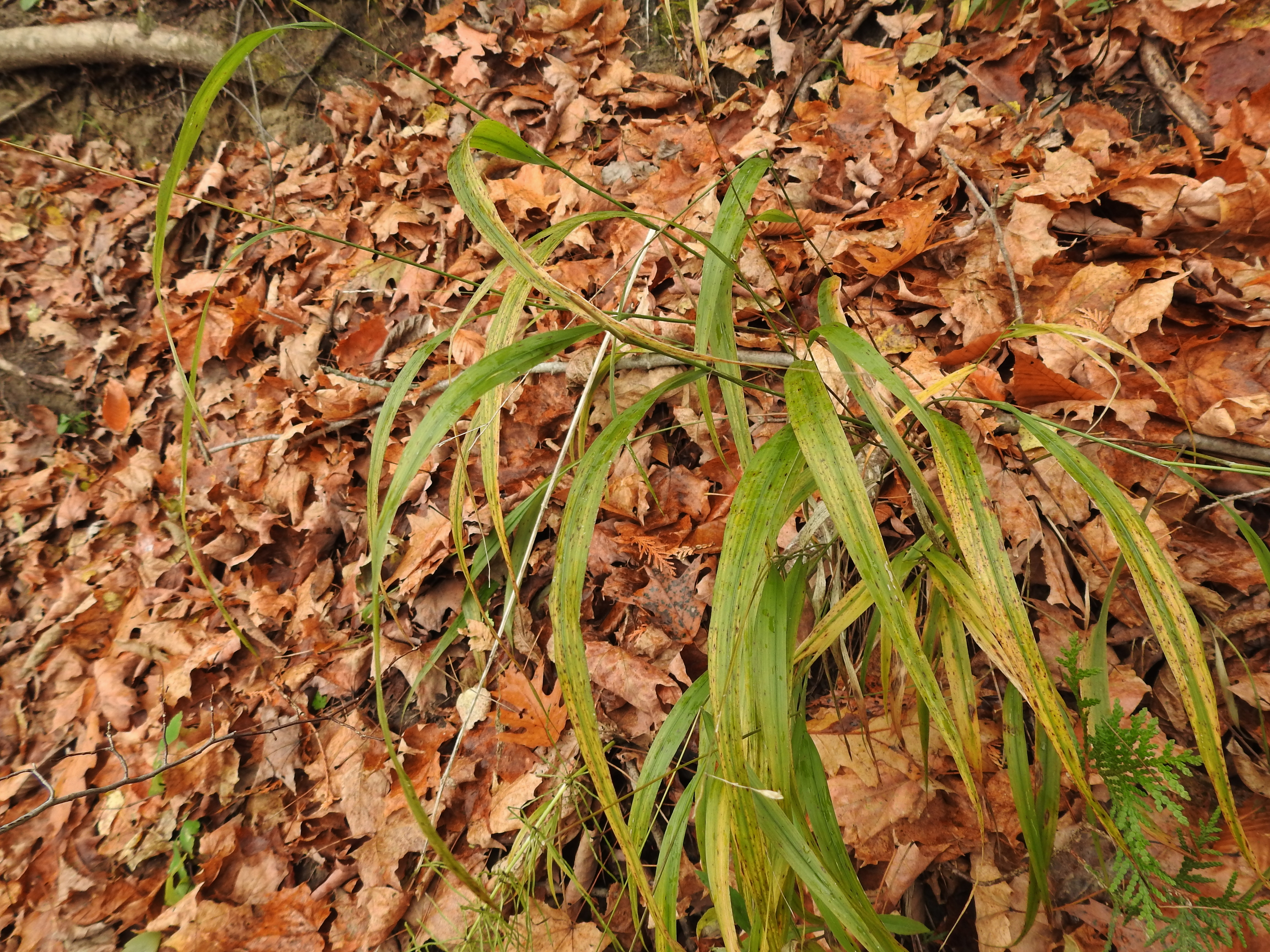
Leaves of Piptatherum racemosum in Elgin County, Ontario, Canada.

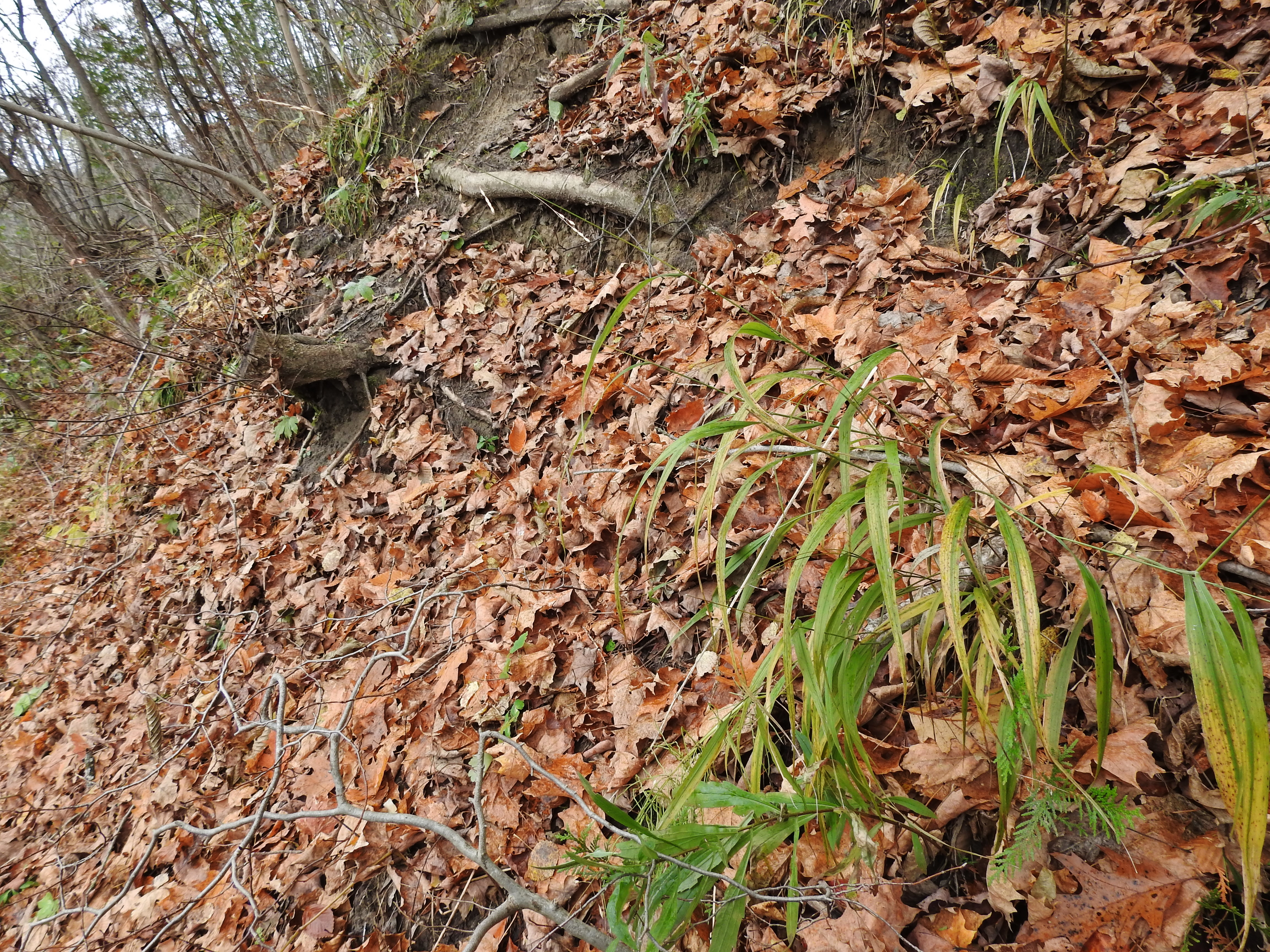
Piptatherum racemosum in Elgin County, Ontario, Canada.
