= Benjamim Guimarães =

Steam paddle boat

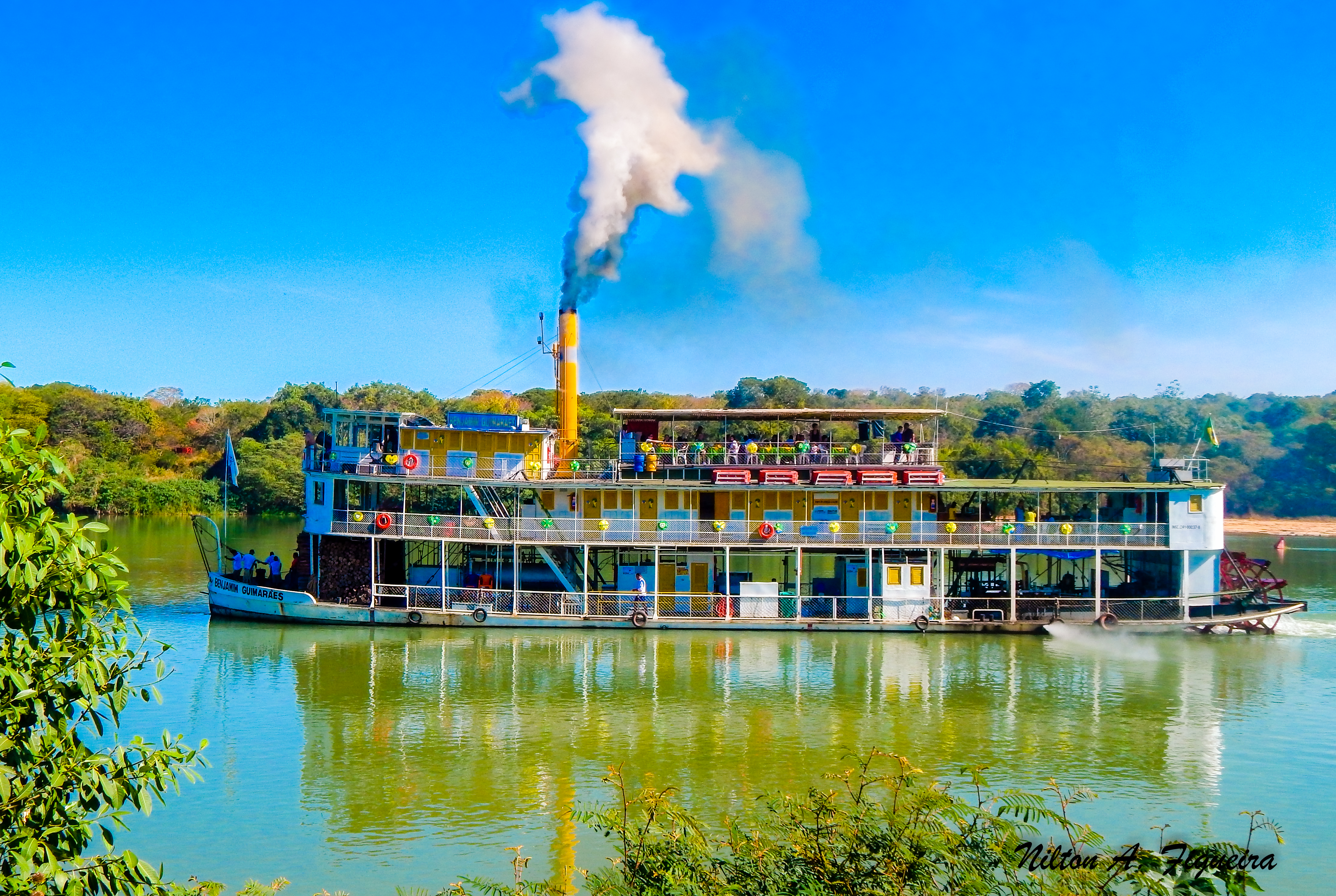
- Benjamim Guimarães seen in 2014.

History
- Name: Benjamim Guimarães
- Port of registry: Minas Gerais, Brazil
- Builder: James Rees and Company, Pittsburgh, Pennsylvania
- Completed: 1913

General characteristics
- Type: Paddle steamer

Benjamim Guimarães is a steam paddle boat based in Pirapora, Minas Gerais, Brazil.

It was built at Pittsburgh in the United States by James Rees and Company in 1913, one of a number of similar knockdown (KD) riverboat steamers built for South American service. This boat was originally named Gaiola, and the original owner was Julio Guimaraes. It originally navigated the rivers of the Amazon basin. In the 1920s Benjamim Guimarães moved to the port of Pirapora on the Sao Francisco River.

Benjamim Guimarães is the only functioning steam paddle boat in all of Brazil. It is a tourist attraction and makes routine public trips on the São Francisco River from Pirapora downstream to the beginning of the Das Velhas River.
