= Luislândia =

Municipality in the north of the Brazilian state of Minas Gerais

Coordinates: 16°07′04″S 44°35′20″W

- Municipality
- Interactive map of Luislândia
- Country: Brazil
- State: Minas Gerais
- Region: Southeast
- Time zone: UTC−3 (BRT)

Location of Luislândia in the state of Minas Gerais

Luislândia is a municipality in the north of the Brazilian state of Minas Gerais. As of 2020 the population was 6,718 in a total area of 425 square kilometres (164 sq mi). It became a municipality in 1997.

== Geography ==
Luislândia is located at an elevation of 758 meters (2,487 ft), 35 kilometres (22 mi). southeast of the São Francisco River. It is on highway MG-402, which connects Brasília de Minas to São Francisco. It belongs to the statistical microregion of Montes Claros. Neighboring municipalities are Brasília de Minas, São Francisco, Icaraí de Minas, and Ubaí.

Distances

- Belo Horizonte: 540 kilometres (340 mi).
- São Francisco: 34 kilometres (21 mi).
- Brasília de Minas: 31 kilometres (19 mi).

== Economic activities ==
The most important economic activities are cattle raising, commerce, and subsistence agriculture. The GDP in 2005 was R$ 17,854,000. Luislândia is in the bottom tier of municipalities in the state with regard to economic and social development. It suffers from isolation, poor soils, and periodic drought. As of 2007 there were no banking agencies in the town. There was a small retail commerce serving the surrounding area of cattle and agricultural lands. In the rural area there were 384 establishments employing about 1,500 workers. Only 13 of the farms had tractors. There were 71 automobiles in all of the municipality. There were 15,000 head of cattle in 2006. The crops with a planted area of more than 100 hectares (250 acres) were beans, sugarcane, manioc, and corn.

== Health and education ==
In the health sector there were 3 clinics and no hospitals. In the educational sector there were 10 primary schools and 1 middle school.

- Municipal Human Development Index: 0.634 (2000)
- State ranking: 783 out of 853 municipalities as of 2000
- National ranking: 4,051 out of 5,138 municipalities as of 2000
- Literacy rate: 70%
- Life expectancy: 67 (average of males and females)
- Urbanization rate: 36.07 (2000)
- Percentage of urban houses served by sewage system: 1.90
- Infant mortality rate: n/a

The highest ranking municipality in Minas Gerais in 2000 was Poços de Caldas with 0.841, while the lowest was Setubinha with 0.568. Nationally the highest was São Caetano do Sul in São Paulo with 0.919, while the lowest was Setubinha. In more recent statistics (considering 5,507 municipalities) Manari in the state of Pernambuco has the lowest rating in the country—0.467—putting it in last place.

== See also ==
- List of municipalities in Minas Gerais
