= Patis, Minas Gerais =

Municipality in Santa Catarina, Brazil

Coordinates: 16°04′51″S 44°04′54″W

Patis
- Municipality
- Municipality of Patis
- Location in Brazil
- Country: Brazil
- Region: Southeast
- State: Minas Gerais
- Mesoregion: Norte de Minas
- Microregion: Patis
- Website: www.patis.mg.gov.br

Location of Patis in the state of Minas Gerais

Patis is a municipality in the north of the Brazilian state of Minas Gerais. As of 2010 the population was 5,579 in a total area of 444 km^{2}. It became a municipality in 1995.

== Geography ==
Patis is located at an elevation of 771 meters, about 90 km. north of the regional center of Montes Claros. It is 17 km. east of highway BR-135, which connects Montes Claros to Januária. It belongs to the statistical microregion of Montes Claros. Neighboring municipalities are Brasília de Minas, Japonvar, São João da Ponte, Mirabela, and Montes Claros.

Distances

- Belo Horizonte: 528 km.
- São João da Ponte: 18 km.
- Mirabela: 25 km.

== Economic activities ==
The most important economic activities are cattle raising, commerce, and subsistence farming. The GDP in 2005 was R$14,893,000. Patis is in the bottom tier of municipalities in the state with regard to economic and social development. It suffers from isolation, poor soils, and periodic drought. As of 2007 there were no banking agencies in the town. There was a small retail commerce serving the surrounding area of cattle and agricultural lands. In the rural area there were 528 establishments employing about 1,500 workers. Only 23 of the farms had tractors. There were 84 automobiles in all of the municipality. There were 19,500 head of cattle in 2006. The crops with a planted area of more than 50 hectares were beans, sugarcane, manioc, and corn.

== Health and education ==
In the health sector there were 16 clinics and 1 hospital with 17 beds. In the educational sector there were 12 primary schools and 1 middle school.

- Municipal Human Development Index: 0.605 (2000)
- State ranking: 823 out of 853 municipalities as of 2000
- National ranking: 4,572 out of 5,138 municipalities as of 2000
- Literacy rate: 64%
- Life expectancy: 64 (average of males and females)
- Percentage of population in urban area: 39.39 (2000)
- Percentage of urban houses served by sewage system: 0.00
- Infant mortality rate: 10.64

The highest ranking municipality in Minas Gerais in 2000 was Poços de Caldas with 0.841, while the lowest was Setubinha with 0.568. Nationally the highest was São Caetano do Sul in São Paulo with 0.919, while the lowest was Setubinha. In more recent statistics (considering 5,507 municipalities) Manari in the state of Pernambuco has the lowest rating in the country—0.467—putting it in last place.

== See also ==
- List of municipalities in Minas Gerais
