= São João da Serra =

- Municipality
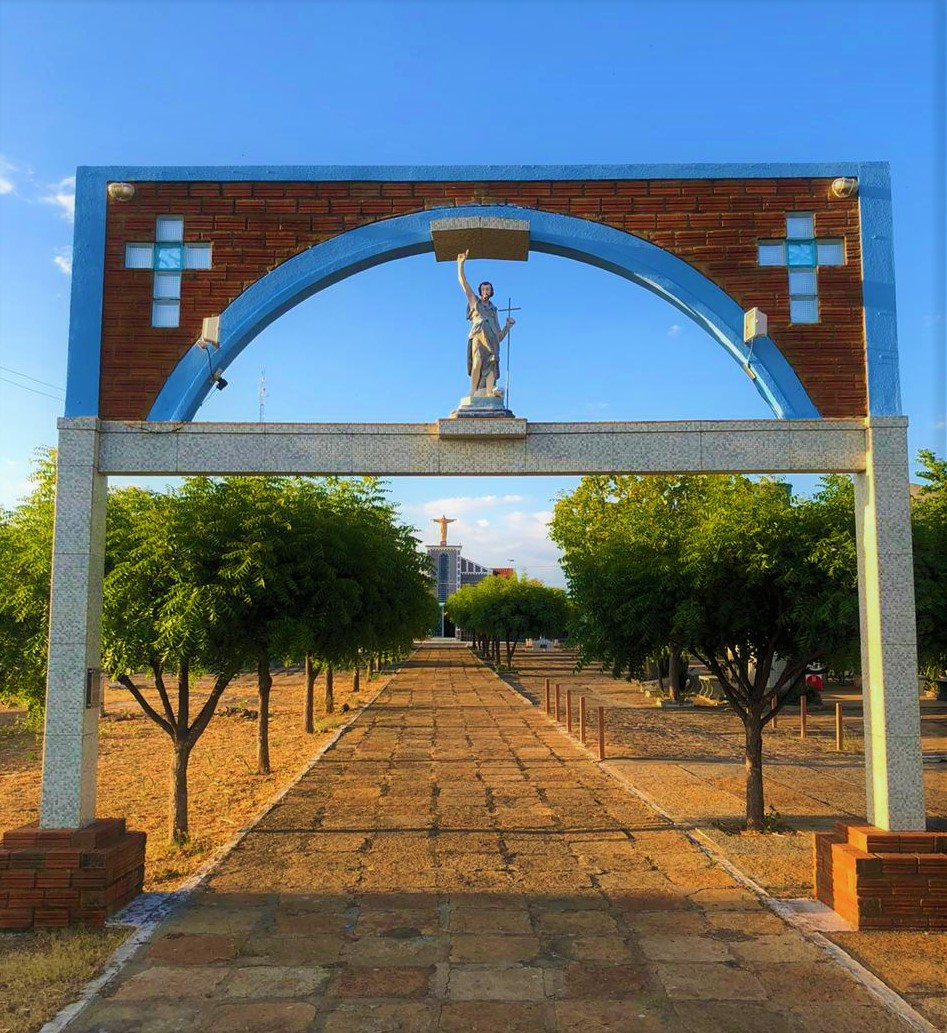

- Location in Brazil
- Coordinates: 5°30′50″S 41°53′56″W
- Country: Brazil
- Region: Nordeste
- State: Piauí
- Mesoregion: Centro-Norte Piauiense

Government
  - Mayor: Joao Francisco Gomes da Rocha

Area
  - Total: 371.530 sq mi (962.258 km^{2})

Population (2020)
  - Total: 6,122
  - Density: 16.48/sq mi (6.362/km^{2})
- Time zone: UTC−3 (BRT)

São João da Serra is a municipality in the state of Piauí in the Northeast region of Brazil.

== See also ==
- List of municipalities in Piauí
