= Brasília de Minas =

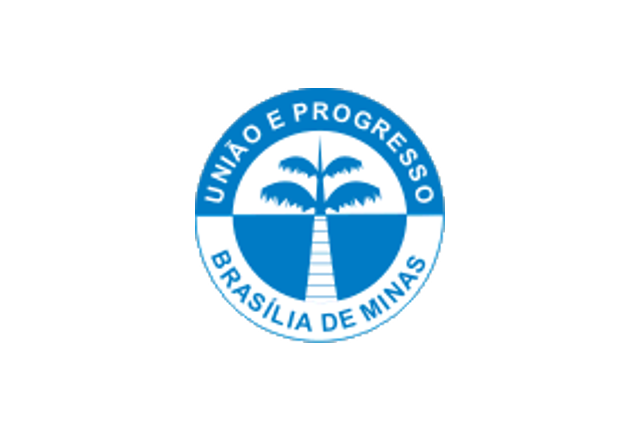
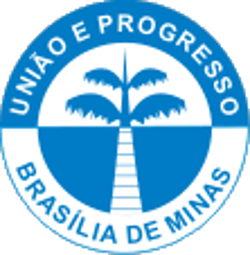
- Flag Seal
- Nickname: Portuguese: Brasilinha (Small Brasília)
- Motto: Portuguese: União e Progresso (Union and Progress)
- Location in Brazil

- Location within Brazil
- Coordinates: 16°12′28″S 44°25′44″W
- Country: Brazil
- Region: Southeast
- State: Minas Gerais
- Mesoregion: North of Minas Gerais
- Microregion: Montes Claros
- Founded: 1894

Government
  - Mayor: Jair Oliva Junior

Area
  - City: 1,398.563 km^{2} (539.988 sq mi)
  - Urban: 4.48 km^{2} (1.73 sq mi)
- Elevation: 908 m (2,979 ft)

Population (2020)
  - City: 32,405
  - Density: 22.32/km^{2} (57.8/sq mi)
- Time zone: UTC−3 (BRT)
- HDI (2008): 0.798
- Website: Municipality official's website

Brasília de Minas is a Brazilian municipality located in the north of the state of Minas Gerais. In 2020 the population was 32,405 in a total area of 1,398 km^{2} (540 sq mi). It became a municipality in 1923.

Brasília de Minas is located about 105 km. northwest of the nearest major population center, Montes Claros, at an elevation of 723 meters. Neighboring municipalities are: Campo Azul, Coração de Jesus, Japonvar, Luislândia, Mirabela, Patis de Minas, São João do Pacuí, São Francisco and Ubaí. It is part of the IBGE statistical microregion of Montes Claros.

The most important economic activities are cattle raising, small and medium industries, and agriculture. The GDP in 2003 was R$88,275,000. Brasília de Minas is in the middle tier of municipalities in the state with regard to economic and social development. It suffers from isolation, poor soils, drought, and inadequate transport connections. In 2007 there were 02 banking agencies and there were 1,326 automobiles.

In the rural area there were 2,648 farming establishments with a total area of 65,000 hectares. Around 9,000 people worked in agriculture. There were 48,000 head of cattle. The main agricultural crops were sugarcane, beans, corn, and sorghum.

- Municipal Human Development Index: 0.691 (2000)
- State ranking: 584 out of 853 municipalities as of 2000
- National ranking: 3,135 out of 5,138 municipalities as of 2000

The highest ranking municipality in Minas Gerais in 2000 was Poços de Caldas with 0.841, while the lowest was Setubinha with 0.568. Nationally the highest was São Caetano do Sul in São Paulo with 0.919, while the lowest was Setubinha.

The first name of this settlement was Sant'Ana de Contendas. In 1890 it became a "vila" with the name Contendas. In 1901 the name was changed to Vila de Brasília and, in 1923, changed again to Brasília. With the transfer of the national capital to the Planalto Central, the town gave up its name for the future capital, in an agreement between President Juscelino Kubitschek and the local mayor. In order not to lose the name completely a change was made to the name adding "de Minas".

In the health sector there were 18 establishments (13 public and 5 private), of which there was 01 public and 01 private hospital with a total of 118 beds.

== See also ==
- List of municipalities in Minas Gerais
