= Japonvar =

Brazilian municipality

Coordinates: 15°59′42″S 44°16′12″W

- Municipality
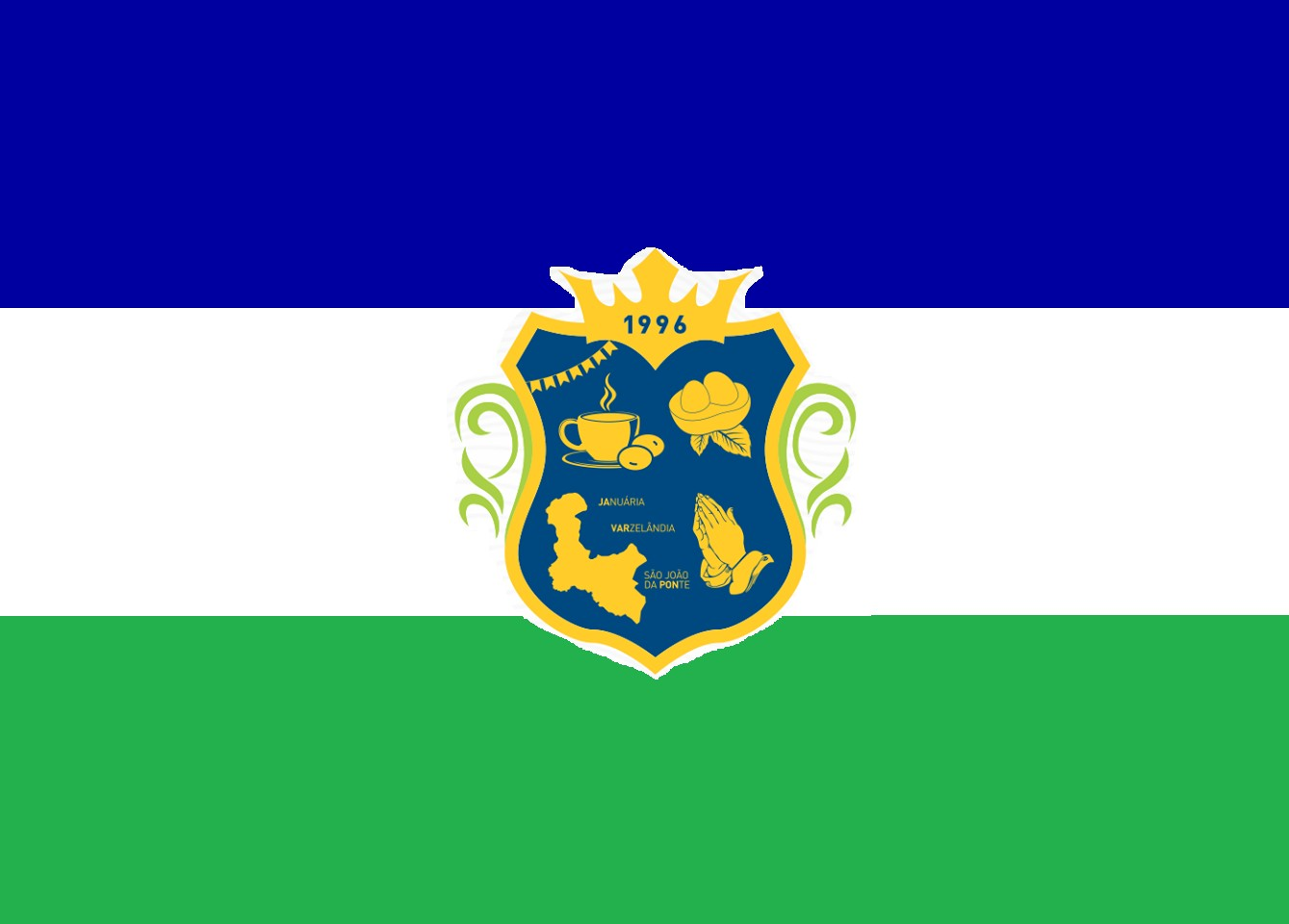
- Flag
- Interactive map of Japonvar
- Country: Brazil
- State: Minas Gerais
- Region: Southeast
- Time zone: UTC−3 (BRT)

Location of Japonvar within the state of Minas Gerais

Japonvar is a Brazilian municipality located in the north of the state of Minas Gerais. In 2020 the population was 7,982 in a total area of 376 km^{2} (145 sq mi). It became a municipality in 1997.

== Geography ==
Japonvar is located on BR-135 which connects Montes Claros and Januária. The elevation of the municipal seat is 700 meters. Japonvar is part of the statistical microregion of Montes Claros. Neighboring municipalities are: Lontra, São João da Ponte, Patis, Brasília de Minas, and São Francisco.

== Economy ==
The most important economic activities are cattle raising, commerce, and subsistence agriculture. The GDP in 2005 was R$ 19,043,000. Japonvar is in the bottom tier of municipalities in the state with regard to economic and social development. It suffers from isolation, poor soils, and periodic drought. As of 2007, there were no banking agencies in the town. There was a small retail commerce serving the surrounding area of cattle and agricultural lands. In the rural area, there were 646 establishments employing about 1,700 workers. Only 04 of the farms had tractors. There were 80 automobiles in all of the municipalities. There were 8,700 head of cattle in 2006. The crops with a planted area of more than 100 hectares were beans, sugarcane, manioc, and corn.

== Health and education ==
- Municipal Human Development Index: 0.618 (2000)
- State ranking: 807 out of 853 municipalities as of 2000
- National ranking: 4,339 out of 5,138 municipalities as of 2000
- Literacy rate: 66%
- Life expectancy: 66 (average of males and females)
- Urbanization rate: 31.73 (2000)
- Percentage of urban houses served by sewage system: 98.10
- Infant mortality rate: n/a

The highest ranking municipality in Minas Gerais in 2000 was Poços de Caldas with 0.841, while the lowest was Setubinha with 0.568. Nationally the highest was São Caetano do Sul in São Paulo with 0.919, while the lowest was Setubinha.

In the health sector, there were 06 clinics and no hospitals. In the educational sector, there were 08 primary schools and 01 middle school.

== Origin of the name ==
The name Japonvar came about because the settlement began at the junction of three rural roads, which led to Januária, São João da Ponte, and Varzelândia.

== See also ==
- List of municipalities in Minas Gerais
