= Campo Azul, Minas Gerais =

Human settlement in Brazil

Coordinates: 16°30′21″S 44°48′41″W

- Municipality
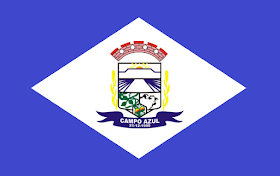
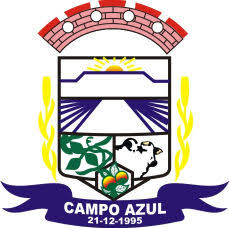
- Flag Coat of arms
- Interactive map of Campo Azul, Minas Gerais
- Country: Brazil
- State: Minas Gerais
- Region: Southeast
- Time zone: UTC−3 (BRT)

Location of Campo Azul within the state of Minas Gerais

Campo Azul is a Brazilian municipality located in the north of the state of Minas Gerais. In 2020 the population was 3,824 in a total area of 506 km^{2} (195 sq mi). It became a municipality in 1995.

Campo Azul is located east of the São Francisco River between São Francisco and Montes Claros. It is 50 km. from the nearest major population center, São Francisco, at an elevation of 612 meters. Neighboring municipalities are: Ubaí, Brasília de Minas, Ponto Chique, and São João do Pacuí. Campo Azul is part of the statistical microregion of Montes Claros.

The most important economic activities are cattle raising and agriculture. The GDP in 2003 was R$8,940,000, with a per capita income of R$2,432. Campo Azul is in the bottom tier of municipalities in the state with regard to economic and social development. It suffers from isolation, poor soils, drought, and inadequate transport connections.

- Municipal Human Development Index: 0.650 (2000)
- State ranking: 743 out of 853 municipalities as of 2000
- National ranking: 3,780 out of 5,138 municipalities as of 2000
- Literacy rate: 74%
- Life expectancy: 67 (average of males and females)

The highest ranking municipality in Minas Gerais in 2000 was Poços de Caldas with 0.841, while the lowest was Setubinha with 0.568. Nationally the highest was São Caetano do Sul in São Paulo with 0.919, while the lowest was Setubinha.

== See also ==
- List of municipalities in Minas Gerais
