= Santa Fé de Minas =

Brazilian municipality located in the north of the state of Minas Gerais

Coordinates: 16°41′26″S 45°24′44″W

- Municipality
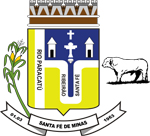
- Flag Coat of arms
- Interactive map of Santa Fé de Minas
- Country: Brazil
- State: Minas Gerais
- Region: Southeast
- Time zone: UTC−3 (BRT)

Location of Santa Fé de Minas within the state of Minas Gerais

Santa Fé de Minas is a Brazilian municipality located in the north of the state of Minas Gerais. In 2020 the population was 3,826 in a total area of 2,916 km^{2} (1,126 sq mi). It became a municipality in 1962.

Santa Fé de Minas is located about 130 km. northwest of the nearest major population center, Pirapora at an elevation of 493 meters. Neighboring municipalities are: São Romão, Buritizeiro, Brasilândia de Minas, and Bonfinópolis de Minas. It is part of the statistical microregion of Pirapora.

The most important economic activities are cattle raising and agriculture. The GDP in 2005 was R$14,352,000.00. There were no banking agencies in the town in 2007, while there were 33 automobiles, one of the lowest ratios in the state. In the rural area there were 467 establishments on a total area of 211,000 hectares, of which 3,500 hectares were planted in crops. Around 1,500 people were working in agriculture. There were 44,000 head of cattle. The main crops were rice, beans, and corn.

- Municipal Human Development Index: 0.622 (2000)
- State ranking: 802 out of 853 municipalities as of 2000
- National ranking: 4,273 out of 5,138 municipalities as of 2000

The highest ranking municipality in Minas Gerais in 2000 was Poços de Caldas with 0.841, while the lowest was Setubinha with 0.568. Nationally the highest was São Caetano do Sul in São Paulo with 0.919, while the lowest was Setubinha.

In the health sector there were two health clinics and one hospital with 3 beds.

== See also ==
- List of municipalities in Minas Gerais
