= Fort San Juan =

Fort San Juan may refer to:

- Fort San Juan (Joara), established by Juan Pardo in 1567-8 as the earliest Spanish outpost in the interior of what is now North Carolina
- Fort San Juan (Nicaragua)
- Battle of Fort San Juan (1780), in which the fort in Nicaragua was contested
- San Juan de Ulúa, a fortress complex on an island overlooking Veracruz, Mexico
- Fortín San Juan de la Cruz (Fort Saint John of the Cross), or El Cañuelo, on Isla de Cabras, Puerto Rico
- San Juan del Bayou, a previous name of Spanish Fort, New Orleans
