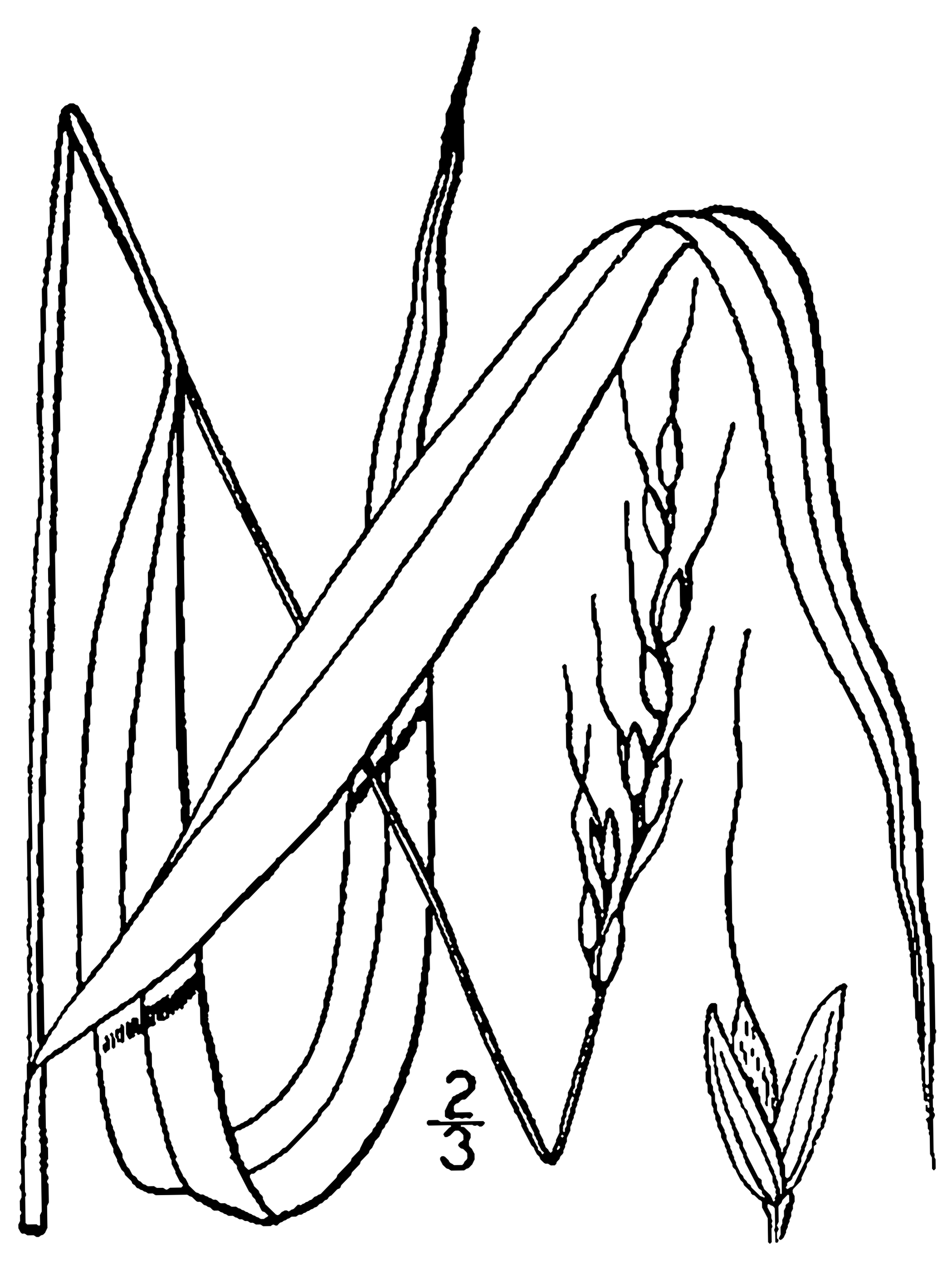
- Patis racemosa

Scientific classification
- Kingdom: Plantae
- Clade: Tracheophytes
- Clade: Angiosperms
- Clade: Monocots
- Clade: Commelinids
- Order: Poales
- Family: Poaceae
- Subfamily: Pooideae
- Supertribe: Stipodae
- Tribe: Stipeae
- Genus: Patis; Ohwi, 1942

Type species
- Patis coreana Ohwi

= Patis (plant) =

Genus of grasses

Patis is a genus of grasses in the Stipeae tribe of the grass family, found in China, Korea, Japan, eastern Canada, and north central and eastern United States.

The name Patis, an anagram of the closely related Stipa, was assigned by Japanese botanist Jisaburo Ohwi (1905–1977) in 1942.

== Species ==
Three species are recognized; each of them has a synonym. In each case, the alternative genus name is within the tribe Stipeae.

- Patis coreana (Honda) Ohwi (Korean needlegrass; Stipa coreana Honda)
- Patis obtusa (Stapf) Romasch., P.M. Peterson & Soreng (Piptatherum kuoi)
- Patis racemosa (Sm.) Romasch., P.M. Peterson & Soreng (Oryzopsis racemosa)

P. coreana and P. obusa are found in east Asia, and P. racemosa in North America.
