= Fort Saint-Jean =

Fort Saint-Jean may refer to:

- Fort Saint-Jean (Lyon)
- Fort Saint-Jean (Marseille)
- Fort Saint-Jean (Quebec)
  - Saint-Jean-sur-Richelieu, city developed around the original Fort
