= São João da Mata =

- Municipality
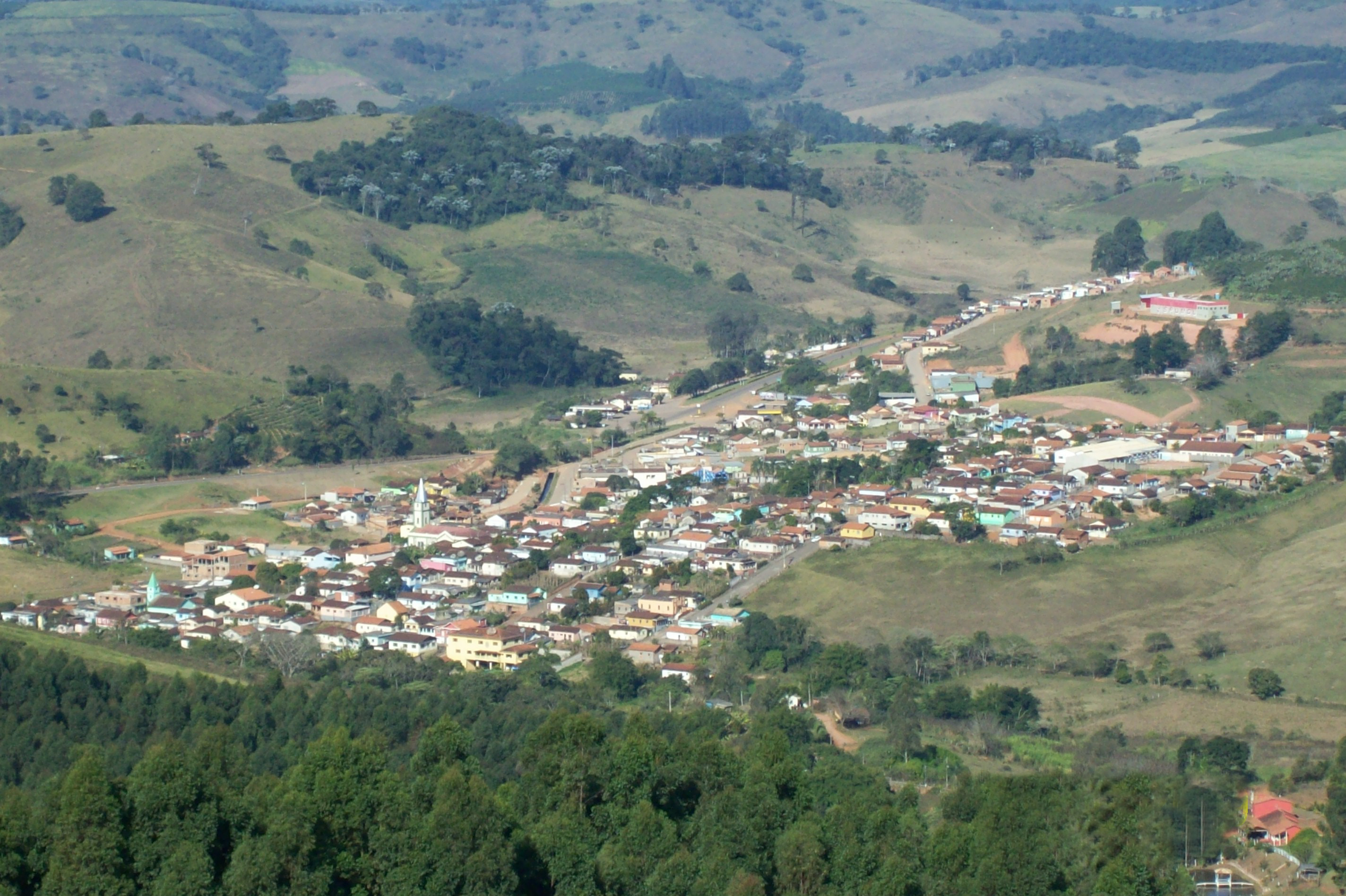

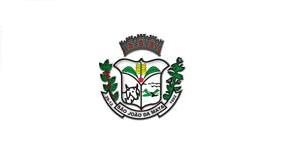
- Flag Coat of arms

- Location in Brazil
- Coordinates: 21°55′48″S 45°55′44″W
- Country: Brazil
- Region: Southeast
- State: Minas Gerais
- Mesoregion: Sul/Sudoeste de Minas

Population (2020)
  - Total: 2,746
- Time zone: UTC−3 (BRT)

São João da Mata is a municipality in the state of Minas Gerais in the Southeast region of Brazil.

== See also ==
- List of municipalities in Minas Gerais
