= São João do Arraial =

- Municipality
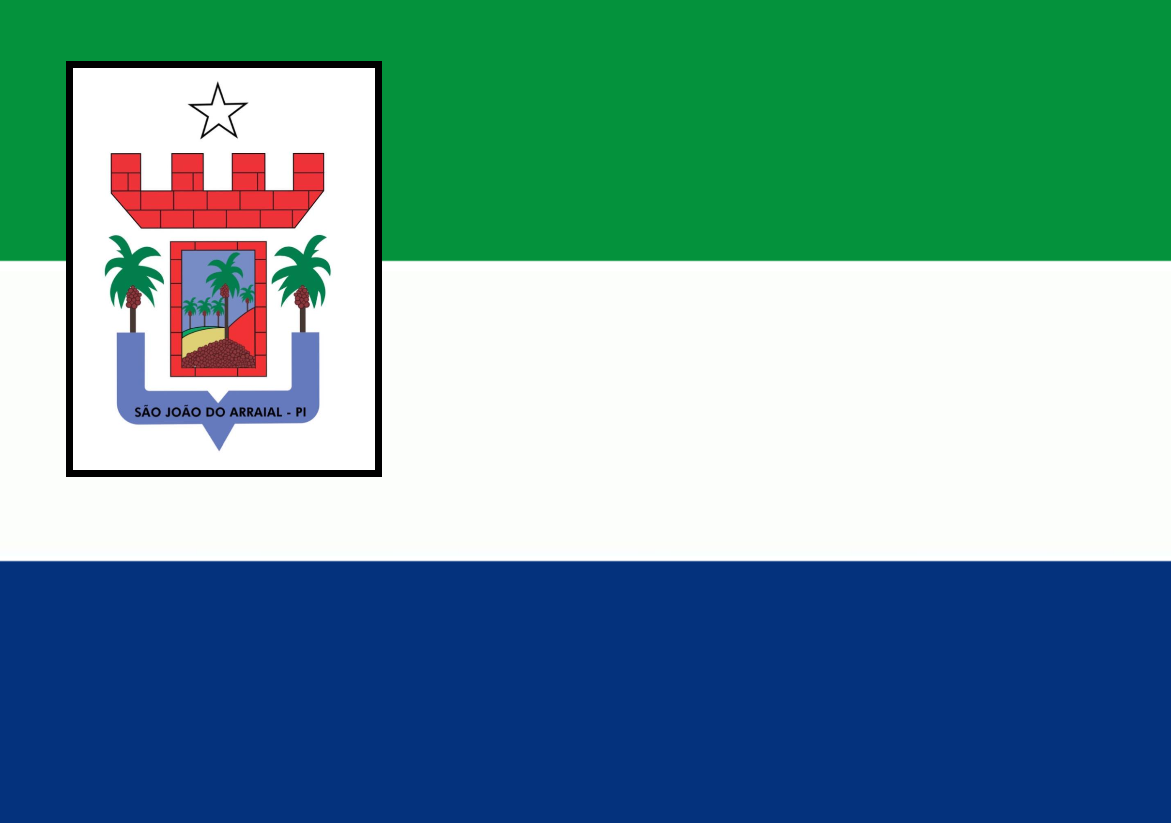
- Flag

- Location in Brazil
- Coordinates: 03°49′18″S 42°26′57″W
- Country: Brazil
- Region: Nordeste
- State: Piauí
- Mesoregion: Norte Piauiense

Area
  - Total: 213.351 km^{2} (82.375 sq mi)
- Elevation: 98 m (322 ft)

Population (2020)
  - Total: 8,038
  - Density: 37.68/km^{2} (97.58/sq mi)
- Time zone: UTC−3 (BRT)
- Post code: 64155
- Area code: (+55) 86

São João do Arraial is a municipality in the state of Piauí in the Northeast region of Brazil.

== See also ==
- List of municipalities in Piauí
