= São João do Caiuá =

Coordinates: 22°48′S 52°22′W

- Municipality
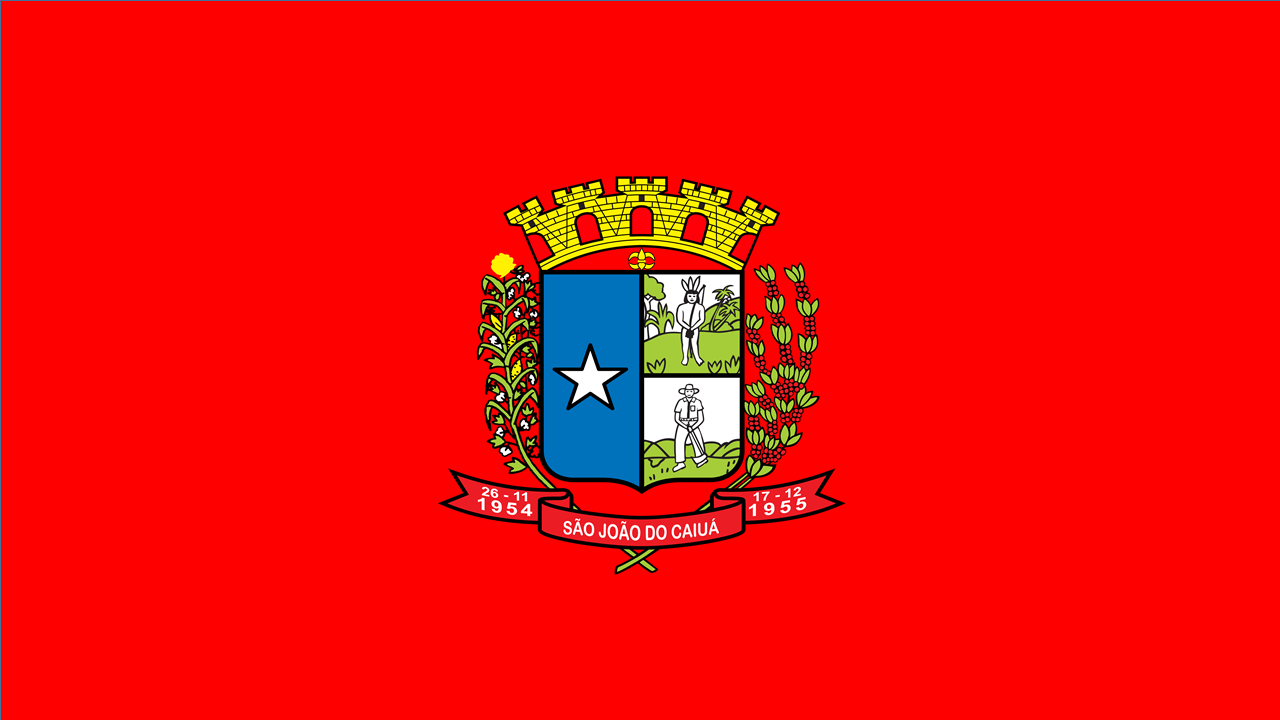
- Flag
- Interactive map of São João do Caiuá
- Country: Brazil
- Region: Southern
- State: Paraná
- Mesoregion: Noroeste Paranaense

Population (2020)
  - Total: 5,837
- Time zone: UTC−3 (BRT)

São João do Caiuá is a municipality in the state of Paraná in the Southern Region of Brazil.

== See also ==
- List of municipalities in Paraná
