= São João do Manhuaçu =

Brazilian municipality located in the state of Minas Gerais

Coordinates: 20°23′38″S 42°09′03″W

- Municipality
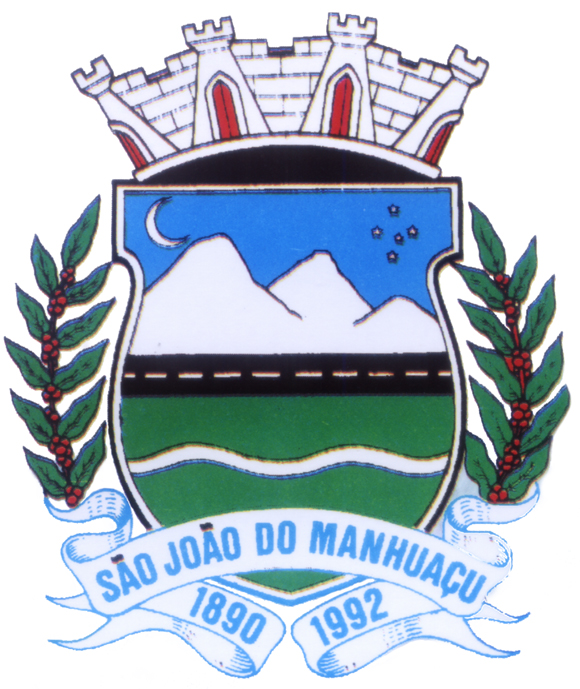
- Coat of arms
- Interactive map of São João do Manhuaçu
- Country: Brazil
- State: Minas Gerais
- Region: Southeast
- Time zone: UTC−3 (BRT)

Location of São João do Manhuaçu within Minas Gerais

São João do Manhuaçu is a Brazilian municipality located in the state of Minas Gerais. The city belongs to the mesoregion of Zona da Mata and to the microregion of Manhuaçu. As of 2020, the estimated population was 11,674.

== See also ==
- List of municipalities in Minas Gerais
