= Forte de São João =

Forte de São João or Fortaleza de São João (also de São João Baptista) may refer to several forts:

== In Portugal ==
=== Mainland ===
- Fort of São João do Arade, in the Algarve, Portugal
- Fort São João, outlying the Campo Maior Castle in Portalegre District, Portugal: see Battle of Albuera

=== Azores ===
- Forte de São João (São Mateus da Calheta), on Terceira Island, Azores
- Castelo de São João Baptista do Monte Brasil, also known as Fortaleza de São João Baptista, on Terceira Island, Azores
- Forte de São João Baptista da Praia Formosa on Santa Maria Island, Azores
- Forte de São João Evangelista, in Vila do Porto, Santa Maria Island, Azores

=== Other islands ===
- Forte de São João Baptista das Berlengas, in the Berlengas archipelago

== In Brazil ==
- Fortaleza de São João (Rio de Janeiro), in Rio de Janeiro, Brazil
- Forte de São João Batista do Brum, in Recife, Brazil
- Forte de São João da Bertioga, on Santo Amaro Island, São Paulo, Brazil

== Elsewhere ==
- Fortaleza de São João Baptista de Ajudá, in Benin
- Forte de São João Baptista de Ternate, in Maluku Islands, Indonesia
- Forte de São João de Mamora, in La Mamora, Morocco
