= São Romão =

Brazilian municipality

- Municipality
- Coat of arms

- Location in Minas Gerais

- Location in Brazil
- Coordinates: 16°22′08″S 45°04′20″W
- Country: Brazil
- Region: Southeast
- State: Minas Gerais
- Time zone: UTC−3 (BRT)
- CEP postal code: 39290-000
- Area code: 38
- Website: saoromao.mg.gov.br

São Romão is a Brazilian municipality located in the north of the state of Minas Gerais. In 2020 the population was 12,529 in a total area of 2,432 km^{2} (939 sq mi). It became a municipality in 1943.

== History ==
Guaiba, an extinct Jê language, was once spoken on Guaiba Island in the São Francisco River near the city of São Romão.

== Geography ==
São Romão is located on the left bank of the São Francisco River at an elevation of 480 meters. It is north of the nearest population center, Pirapora. Montes Claros is to the southeast. Neighboring municipalities are: Riachinho, Santa Fé de Minas, Pintópolis, and Icaraí de Minas. São Romão is part of the statistical microregion of Pirapora. It is located 595 km from the capital of the state (Belo Horizonte).

=== Climate ===
On 26 September 2023, a maximum temperature of 43.5 °C (110.3 °F) was registered in São Romão.

== Economy ==
The most important economic activities are cattle raising (41,000 head in 2006) and agriculture. The GDP in 2005 was R$ 34,260,000. The most important agricultural crops are bananas, oranges, mangoes, rice, sugarcane, beans and corn. There were 233 automobiles. In the rural area there were 576 producers. The total area of agricultural land was 129,000 hectares in 2006, of which 5,800 ha. were planted in crops. As of 2006 there were 86 tractors. In the urban area there was one banking agency in 2006.

== Health and education ==
This municipality is isolated from major population centers and suffers from drought and poor soils.

- Municipal Human Development Index: 0.649 (2000)
- State ranking: 744 out of 853 municipalities as of 2000
- National ranking: 3,788 out of 5,138 municipalities as of 2000

The highest ranking municipality in Minas Gerais in 2000 was Poços de Caldas with 0.841, while the lowest was Setubinha with 0.568. Nationally the highest was São Caetano do Sul in São Paulo with 0.919, while the lowest was Setubinha.

- Degree of urbanization: 66.41% (2000) The rate for Minas Gerais was 82%
- Infant mortality rate: 7.58 (2000) The rate for Minas Gerais was 17.40; the rate for Brazil was 18.91.
- Illiteracy rate: 22.49% (15 years old or older)(Data from 2000) The rate for Minas Gerais was 11.96; the rate for Brazil was 13.63
- Urban area covered by sewage system: 0.50%--the rate for Minas Gerais was 81.39%
- Health centers and hospitals: 02 health centers. There was 01 hospital with 16 beds. The nearest large hospital was in Pirapora.

== See also ==
- List of municipalities in Minas Gerais
