= Buritizeiro =

Municipality in the state of Minas Gerais in Brazil

Coordinates: 17°21′03″S 44°57′50″W

- Municipality
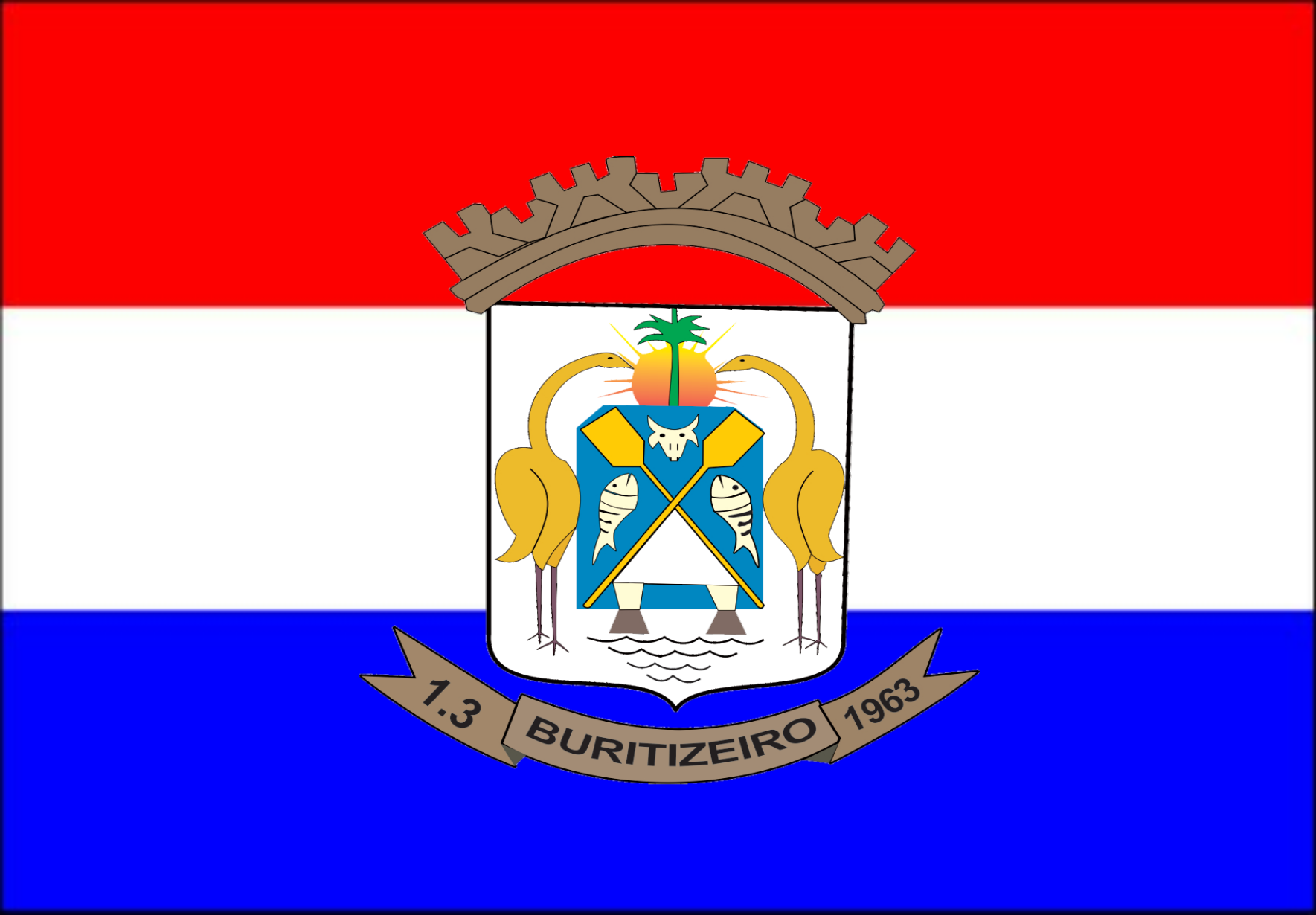
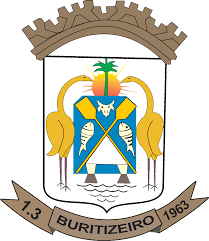
- Flag Coat of arms
- Interactive map of Buritizeiro
- Country: Brazil
- State: Minas Gerais
- Region: Southeast
- Time zone: UTC−3 (BRT)

Location of Buritizeiro in the state of Minas Gerais

Buritizeiro is a municipality in the north of the Brazilian state of Minas Gerais. Its population in 2020 was 28,121 inhabitants in a total area of 7,226 km^{2} (2,790 sq mi). It is a major producer of cattle and grains.

== Geography ==
Buritizeiro belongs to the Paracatu statistical microregion. The elevation of the municipal seat is 836 meters. It became a municipality in 1963. This municipality is located on the left bank of the São Francisco River, across the river from Pirapora. The distance to the capital, Belo Horizonte, is 365 km. Other distances are:

- Pirapora: 6 km.
- Montes Claros: 167 km.
- Uberlândia: 480 km.

Neighboring municipalities are: Pirapora, São Romão, Três Marias e João Pinheiro.

The climate is humid sub-tropical with an average maximum of 30 °C; a minimum of 16 °C; and an annual average of 22 °C.

== Economy ==
The main economic activities are cattle raising and farming. The GDP was R$157,117,000 (2003). There was 01 bank branch. In the health sector there were 20 establishments—19 public and 01 private. There was 01 hospital with 43 beds (2007).

In the rural area there were 723 farms and a total agricultural area of 373,000 hectares, of which 17,000 ha. were planted, 208,000 were in natural pasture, and 135,000 ha. were in woodland or forest. 1,100 people were dependent on farming. 182 of the farms had tractors. The main crops in planted area were coffee, 800 ha.; hearts of palm, 55 ha.; cotton, 700 ha.; rice, 824 ha.; beans, 2,980 ha.; corn, 4,300 ha.; and soybeans, 24,000 ha. In 2006 there were 118,000 head of cattle.

The score on the Municipal Human Development Index was 0.659. This ranked Buritizeiro 712 out of 853 municipalities in the state, with Poços de Caldas in first place with 0.841 and Setubinha in last place with 0.568.

== Tourism ==
Buritizeiro is known for its waterfalls, among which we can point out:

- Cachoeira Grande: located on the Fazenda Santa Cruz
- Cachoeira do Córrego da Areia: located on the Fazenda dos Cristais
- Cachoeira das Andorinhas
- Cachoeira do Riacho Doce: located on the Fazenda dos Cristais
- Cachoeira do Córrego do Gentil

Between the cities of Buritizeiro and Pirapora, the waters of the Rio São Francisco pass a series of rapids that extend for about 600 meters beginning at the Marechal Hermes bridge. These rapids attract fishermen from all over the country.

== History ==
The history of Buritizeiro is connected to the founding and development of Pirapora. In 1912 the settlement, now known as Pirapora, called São Gonçalo das Tabocas, became a city. In 1920 the Marechal Hermes bridge was built to take the railroad as far as Belém in Pará. This railroad line was never extended beyond Pirapora. In 1923 the name of São Gonçalo dos Tabocas was changed to Pirapora. In 1950 Pirapora had the districts of Buritizeiro, Guaicuí, Lassance and Várzea da Palma, and the population was around 30,000 inhabitants. In 1953 the last three became municipalities in their own right. In 1962 the district of Buritizeiro became a municipality. The name is derived from the buriti palm (Mauritia vinifera).

== Social indicators ==
- Infant mortality rate: 10.91 (all data are from 2000)
- Literacy rate: 79.36%
- Percentage of urban residences covered by sewage service: 1.40%
- Degree of urbanization: 84%

== See also ==
- List of municipalities in Minas Gerais
