= Várzea da Palma =

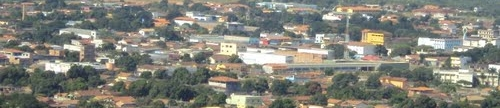

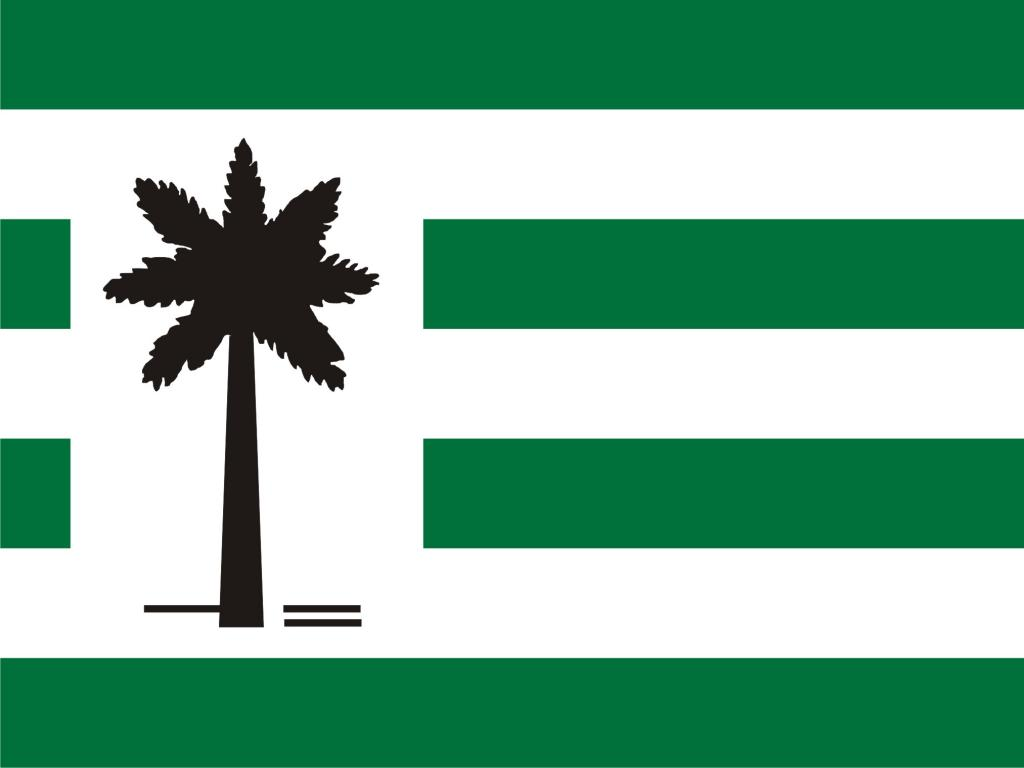
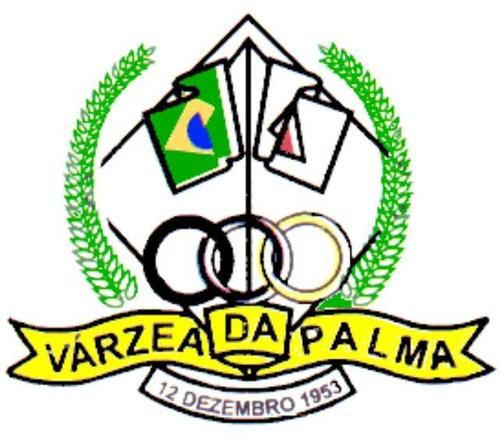
- Flag Coat of arms

- Location of Várzea da Palma in the state of Minas Gerais
- Coordinates: 17°35′52″S 44°43′51″W
- Country: Brazil
- State: Minas Gerais
- Established: 1953

Area
  - Total: 2,195 km^{2} (847 sq mi)
- Elevation: 519 m (1,703 ft)

Population (2020)
  - Total: 39,803
  - Density: 18.13/km^{2} (46.97/sq mi)
- Time zone: UTC−3 (BRT)
- Postal code: 39260-000

Várzea da Palma is a municipality in north-central Minas Gerais in Brazil. Its population in 2020 was 39,803 in a total area of 2,220 km^{2} (860 sq mi).

Várzea da Palma is located east of the São Francisco River and is on the Rio das Velhas, a tributary of the São Francisco. It is 37 km. southeast of Pirapora, the most important city of the region. A railroad line, now only freight, runs through the city. Neighboring municipalities are Pirapora and Lassance.

The former village of Palma Velha was a cluster of huts that served as a campsite for muleteers coming from different regions, on their way to Curvelo. With the building of the railroad Estrada de Ferro Central do Brasil, in 1910, the village changed its name to Várzea da Palma. Around the central station settlers began to make their houses attracted by commerce and the movement of the new railroad line.

Custódio Fernandes Sampaio, considered the founder of the city, was responsible for donating part of his lands for the building of the first church.

In 1948, Várzea da Palma was elevated to the category of district and in 1953 it became a municipality.

The main economic activities are cattle raising for meat production, metal industry, and farming. There is an industry manufacturing iron alloys. The GDP for 2005 was R$447,177,000. In 2005 around 2,500 people were working in 120 transformation industries. There were 03 banking agencies.

In the rural area there were 596 establishments in 2006. The total area of agricultural land was 128,000 hectares, of which 16,000 ha. were planted in crops, 79,000 ha. were natural pasture, and 30,000 were woodland or forest. There were around 2,000 people in agriculture. 110 of the farms had tractors, a ratio of one tractor for every 5 farms. The size of the cattle herd was 85,000 head. The main permanent crops were bananas, coffee, coconut, citrus and tropical fruits, hearts of palm, and table grapes. The main perennial crops were rice, sugarcane, beans, manioc, corn (2,400 ha.), soybeans, and tomatoes.

In the health sector there were 22 health establishments (2005), of which 16 were public and 6 were private. There was 01 private hospital with 48 beds. The score on the Municipal Human Development Index was 0.726. Várzea da Palma was ranked 438 out of 853 municipalities in the state, with Poços de Caldas in first place with 0.841 and Setubinha in last place with 0.568. Nationally it was ranked 2,500 out of 5,138 municipalities in 2000.

== See also ==
- List of municipalities in Minas Gerais
