= Vale do Ribeira =

- Region
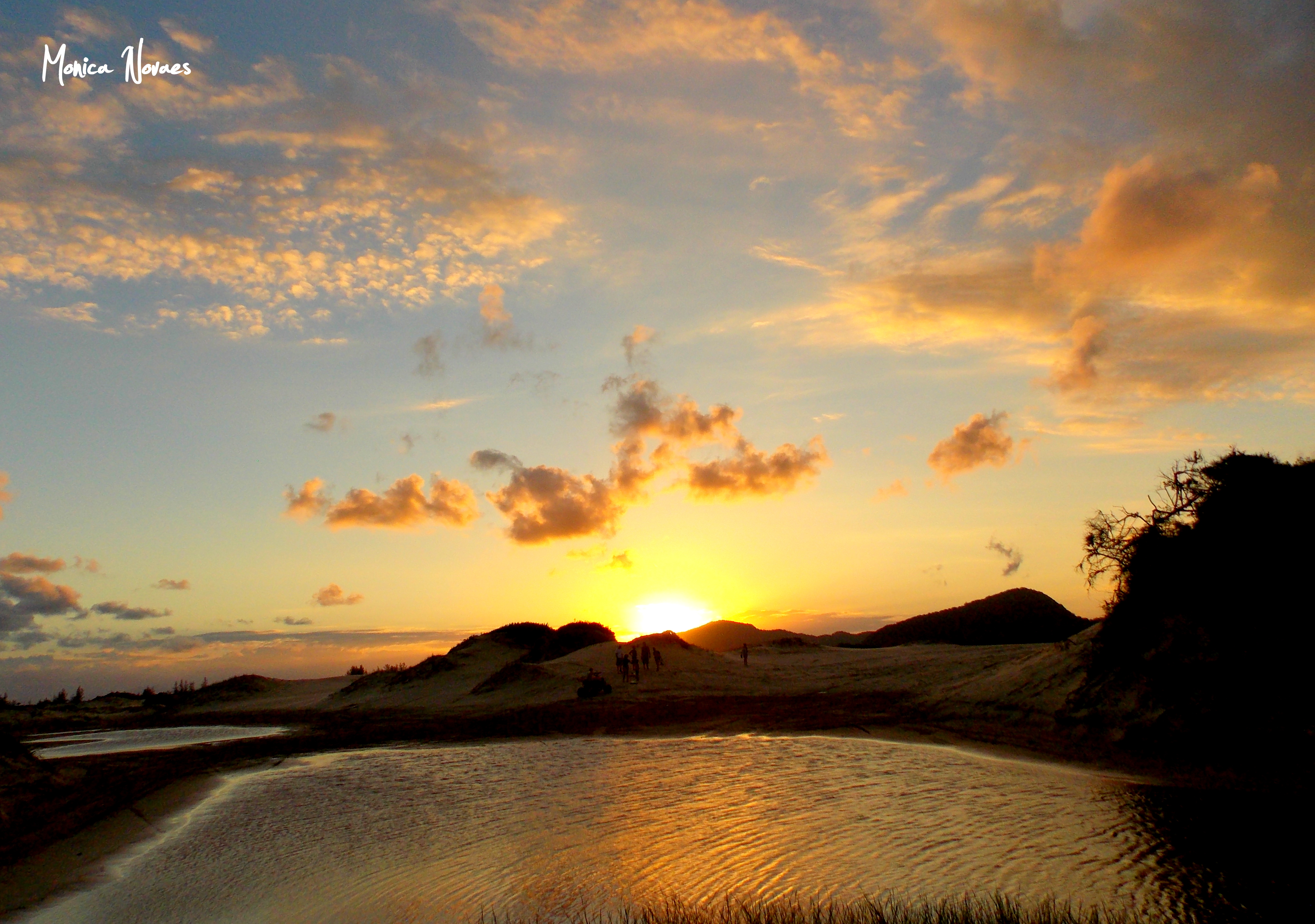
- Mar Pequeno

- Location in Brazil
- Coordinates: 24.609°S 47.797°W
- Country: Brazil
- State: São Paulo, Paraná

Area
  - Total: 28,306.66 km^{2} (10,929.26 sq mi)
- Time zone: UTC-03:00 (BRT)
  - Summer (DST): UTC-02:00 (BRST)

Vale do Ribeira is a region in the south of the state of São Paulo and the northeast of the state of Paraná, Brazil. It contains a large part of the Ribeira de Iguape River valley, from which it takes its name, as well as the coastal Iguape-Cananéia-Paranaguá estuary lagoon complex. The region is environmentally rich, with large areas of well-preserved Atlantic Forest, but economically poor.

== Location ==
The Vale do Ribeira is in the south of the state of São Paulo and in the north of the state of Paraná. It includes the Ribeira de Iguape River Basin and the Iguape-Cananéia-Paranaguá estuary lagoon complex. It has an area of 28,306.66 square kilometres (10,929.26 sq mi), with a 2000 population of 481,224. It includes 22 municipalities in São Paulo and 9 in Paraná. 21 other municipalities in Paraná and 18 in São Paulo contain parts of the Ribeira basin.

== Basins ==
Sub-basins of the Ribeira de Iguape River in São Paulo are:

- Upper Ribeira in the municipalities of Barra do Chapéu, Itapirapuã Paulista, Apiaí, Itaóca, Iporanga and Ribeira
- Lower Ribeira in the municipalities of Apiaí, Iporanga, Eldorado and Sete Barras
- Ribeira de Iguape in the municipalities of Registro, Pariquera-Açu and Iguape
- Upper Juquiá in the municipalities of São Lourenço da Serra, Juquitiba and Tapiraí
- Mid Juquiá in the municipalities of Tapiraí, Juquiá and Miracatu
- Lower Juquiá in the municipalities of Juquiá, Tapiraí, and Sete Barras,
- São Lourenço River in the municipalities of Miracatu, Pedro de Toledo and Juquiá
- Itariri River in the municipalities of Itariri and Pedro de Toledo
- Una da Aldeia River in the municipality of Iguape
- Pardo River in the municipality of Barra do Turvo
- Jacupiranga River in the municipalities of Jacupiranga, Cajati and Registro

Coastal basins of the Iguape-Cananéia-Paranaguá estuary lagoon complex are:

- Vertente Marítima Sul in the municipalities of Cananéia and Ilha Comprida
- Vertente Marítima Norte in the municipality of Iguape.

== Environment ==
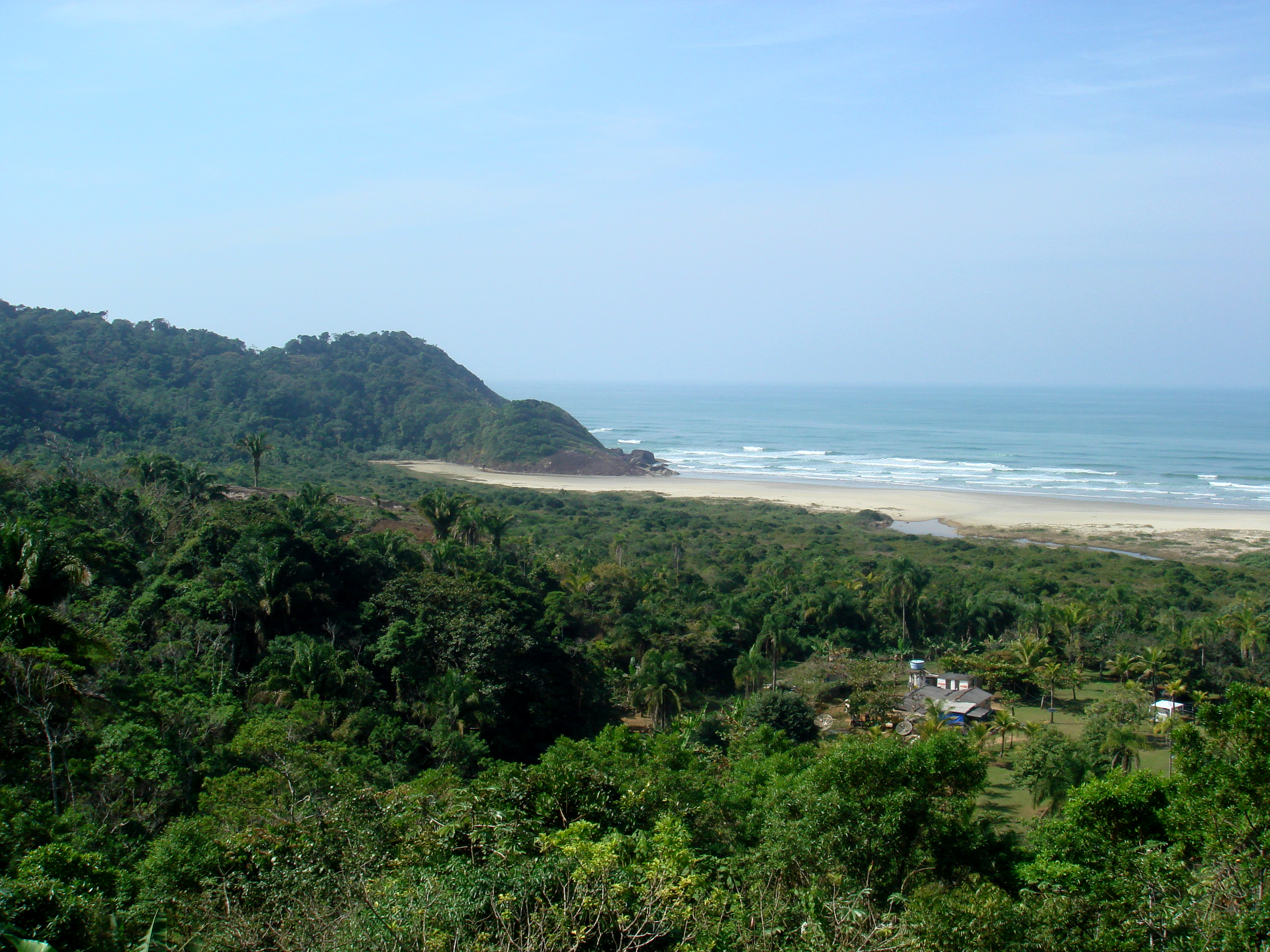
Juréia-Itatins Ecological Station

The region has over 10,000 species of flora and fauna. It has over 21,000 square kilometres (8,100 sq mi) of well-preserved forests, about 21% of the total remaining Atlantic Forest in Brazil. It also has 1,500 square kilometres (580 sq mi) of restinga and 170 square kilometres (66 sq mi) of mangroves. In 1999 the Southeast Atlantic Forest Reserve, which covered 17 municipalities in the Vale do Ribeira, was one of six regions in Brazil that were considered by UNESCO to be natural World Heritage Sites. There are 24 conservation units in the region, containing rare species such as cedar, palmito, cinnamon, araucaria and caxeta, and many types of bromeliad and orchid. Preserved areas are found outside the conservation units in indigenous territories, quilombos and rural districts whose inhabitants practice small-scale subsistence agriculture.

Endangered species include the southern muriqui (Brachyteles arachnoides), jaguar (Panthera onca), ocelot (Leopardus pardalis), Pampas deer (Ozotoceros bezoarticus), black-fronted piping guan (Pipile jacutinga), broad-snouted caiman (Caiman latirostris) and red-tailed amazon (Amazona brasiliensis). Endemic species include saw-billed hermit (Ramphodon naevius), Guiana dolphin (Sotalia guianensis), yellow-legged tinamou (Crypturellus noctivagus) and the Superagui lion tamarin (Leontopithecus caissara).

Conservation units include:

- Bananal Ecological Station
- Carlos Botelho State Park
- Chauás Ecological Station
- Ilha do Cardoso State Park
- Ilhabela State Park
- Intervales State Park
- Juréia-Itatins Ecological Station
- Pariquera Abaixo State Park
- Serra do Mar State Park

== Economy ==
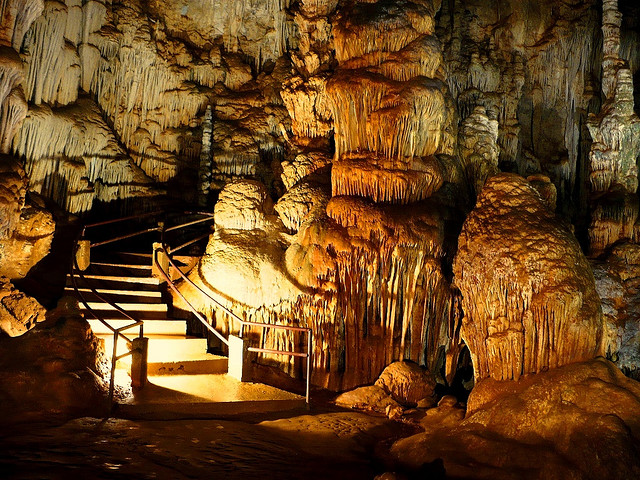
Caverna do Diabo, a major tourist attraction

Gold was mined in the region from the 17th century, and more recently other minerals. Farms produced rice, coffee, tea and bananas. The Vale do Ribeira became a supplier of low-cost natural resources, exploited without regard for the environment or cultural heritage. It is one of the poorest parts of the states of São Paulo and Paraná, with low levels of education and employment. The economically active and young population continues to migrate to other regions. The region is close to the major industrial centers of São Paulo and Curitiba, and there are proposals to divert water to these centers. In recent years infrastructure improvements have included making BR-116 a divided highway and construction of hydroelectric plants.

The Vale do Ribeira today has large numbers of small properties, up to 50 hectares (120 acres), producing bananas, beef, tomatoes and tangerines. Other products include maté tea, rice, corn and flowers, and fish in the coastal portion. There are about 80 caiçaras communities along the 140 kilometres (87 mi) Iguape-Cananéia-Paranaguá estuary lagoon complex, mainly engaged in sustainable subsistence artisanal fishing or collection of crustaceans. There are ten Guarani villages, with families from the Mbyá and Ñandeva subgroups. They practice subsistence agriculture and sustainable hunting and fishing. They have been forced to move more than once when state or national parks were established on their traditional lands.

Agroforestry, producing and selling seedlings of native Atlantic Forest species, is a source of income for many communities. Commercialization of Juçara juice has potential. Mariculture, including oysters, shellfish and fish, is also showing promise. The state and federal governments are investing in development of ecotourism and adventure tourism. Some of the main attractions are the impressive calcareous caves such as those of Diabo, Santana, Morro Preto, Água Suja and Casa da Pedra.

== Administration ==
=== São Paulo ===
In São Paulo the region covers 18,112.80 square kilometres (6,993.39 sq mi) and contains 23 municipalities. The total population is 443,325 inhabitants, of which 114,995 live in rural areas. There are 33 quilombola communities and 13 indigenous territories. The municipalities that make up the region in São Paulo are:

- Apiaí
- Barra do Chapéu
- Barra do Turvo
- Cajati
- Cananéia
- Eldorado
- Iguape
- Ilha Comprida
- Iporanga
- Itaóca
- Itapirapuã Paulista
- Itariri
- Jacupiranga
- Juquitiba
- Juquiá
- Miracatu
- Pariquera-Açú
- Pedro de Toledo
- Registro
- Ribeira
- Ribeirão Grande (Note: Ribeirão Grande is included in the region by the São Paulo state tourist authority, but not by the O Vale do Ribeira website.)
- Sete Barras
- São Lourenço da Serra
- Tapiraí

=== Paraná ===
In Paraná the region covers an area of 6,079.30 square kilometres (2,347.23 sq mi) and contains 7 municipalities. The total population is 100,880 inhabitants, of which 43,131 live in rural areas. There are 12 quilombola communities. Municipalities in Paraná that lie in the Ribeira de Iguape River iguape include:

- Adrianópolis
- Bocaiúva do Sul
- Cerro Azul
- Doutor Ulysses
- Itaperuçu
- Rio Branco do Sul
- Tunas do Paraná

== Sources ==
- Almeida, Camilo Aparecido (26 January 2012), "Bacia Hidrográfica do Rio Ribeira de Iguape", O Vale do Ribeira
- Almeida, Camilo Aparecido (27 January 2012b), "Mapa do Vale do Ribeira", O Vale do Ribeira (in Portuguese)
- Lopes, André, "Vale do Ribeira", Quilombos do Ribeira (in Portuguese)
- Vale do Ribeira (in Portuguese), São Paulo State Government
