= Banhados de Iguape Ecological Station =

Ecological station in Brazil

- Estaco Ecológica dos Banhados de Iguape
- IUCN category Ia (strict nature reserve)
- Location within Brazil
- Nearest city: Iguape, São Paulo
- Coordinates: 24.522406°S 47.383114°W
- Area: 16,588.64 hectares (40,991.4 acres)
- Designation: Ecological station
- Created: 30 March 2006

The Banhados de Iguape Ecological Station (Portuguese: Estaco Ecológica dos Banhados de Iguape) is an ecological station in the state of São Paulo, Brazil. It protects an area of mangrove swamp. Since 2013 it has been administered as part of the Juréia-Itatins Ecological Station.

== Location ==
The Banhados de Iguape Ecological Station (ESEC) covers an area of 16,588.64 hectares (40,991.4 acres) of mangrove swamp in southern São Paulo Visits are only allowed for environmental education and for scientific research. The ESEC consists of the Banhado Grande and Banhado Pequeno areas, which contain several endangered and endemic species. The two areas are important parts of the region of the Serra do Bananal, Serra dos Itatins and Juréia Massif. These contain an extensive area of Atlantic Forest and associated ecosystems in the south-central coast of SP.

== History ==
The Banhados de Iguape Ecological Station has its origins in the Itatins State Reserve (Reserva Estadual dos Itatins) created in 1958. In 1984 the area was included in the Cananéia-Iguape-Peruíbe Environmental Protection Area. In 1986 the biota of the Atlantic slope of the Serra do Mar was declared an area under special state protection. The ESEC was created by decree 50.664 of 30 March 2006 of the governor of the state to ensure full protection of flora, fauna, scenic beauty and marine and land ecosystems. It consisted of three sections contiguous to the Juréia-Itatins Ecological Station.

On 12 December 2006 the law defining the Juréia-Itatins ESEC was altered to exclude and reclassify some areas. The Juréia-Itatins Mosaic was formed, and in the new configuration the Banhados do Iguape ESEC was integrated with the Juréia-Itatins ESEC. The mosaic, with about 110,000 hectares (270,000 acres), also included the Itinguçu State Park, Prelado State Park, Ilhas do Abrigo e Guararitama Wildlife Refuge, Barra do Una Sustainable Development Reserve and Despraiado Sustainable Development Reserve.

In 2009 the activities of the mosaic were suspended and the area was again managed as the Estação Ecológica dos Banhados de Iguape. Law 14982 of 8 April 2013 again redefined the area of the Jureia Itatins Ecological Station, recreating the other conservation units as before, recreating the Jureia Itatins Mosaic, and again incorporating the 2,136 hectares (5,280 acres) Banhado Pequeno and 14,428 hectares (35,650 acres) Banhado Grande into the Jureia Itatins Ecological Station.

== Sources ==
- ESEC dos Banhados do Iguape (in Portuguese), ISA: Instituto Socioambiental
- "Sobre a Estação Ecológica", Sistema Ambiental Paulista (in Portuguese)
- "Sobre a Estação", Sistema Ambiental Paulista (in Portuguese)
