= Jureia-Itatins Mosaic =

- Mosaico Jureia–Itatins
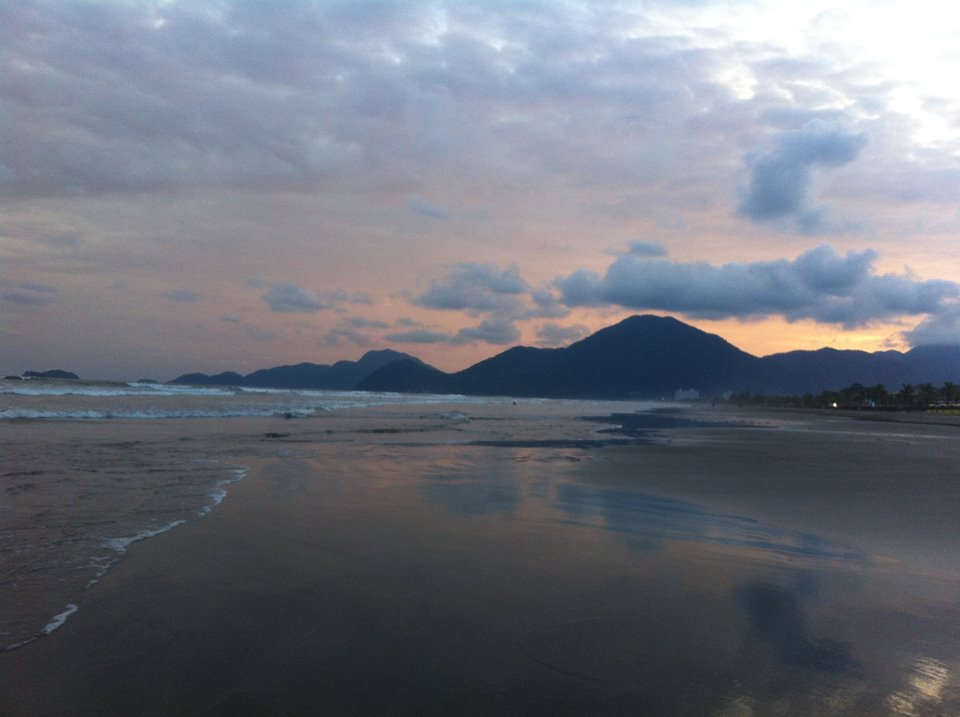
- The Jureia Massif from Peruíbe

- Location within Brazil
- Nearest city: Iguape, São Paulo
- Coordinates: 24.468°S 47.299°W
- Area: 97,213 hectares (240,220 acres)
- Designation: Protected area mosaic
- Created: 12 December 2006

The Jureia-Itatins Mosaic (Portuguese: Mosaico Jureia–Itatins) is a protected area mosaic in the state of São Paulo, Brazil. It was created in 2006, suspended in 2009 and recreated in 2013. It includes strictly protected and sustainable use conservation units in a coastal area of well-preserved Atlantic Forest.

== Location ==
The Jureia-Itatins Mosaic covers parts of the municipalities of Iguape, Itariri, Miracatu and Peruíbe in the state of São Paulo. When first created in 2006 it covered 110,898 hectares (274,030 acres). After being recreated in 2013 it covered 97,213 hectares (240,220 acres). The Jureia-Itatins area is environmentally important since it holds one of the best preserved remnants of Atlantic Forest. It includes an extensive fluvial marine plain through which the Una do Prelado River flows, with rich flora and fauna.

== History ==
=== First version ===
The Jureia-Itatins Mosaic of conservation units was created by law 12.406 of 12 December 2006. It included the Jureia-Itatins Ecological Station and the newly created Itinguçu and Prelado state parks, Despraiado and Barra do Una sustainable development reserves and the Ilhas do Abrigo e Guararitama Wildlife Refuge. The state parks and sustainable development reserves were carved out of the ecological station, and an area of banana plantations in the municipality of Miracatu, north of the station, was also dropped from the station. However the Iguape swamps were added to the ecological station, which now covered 96,000 hectares (240,000 acres) rather than its former 79,000 hectares (200,000 acres).

On 11 September 2007 the procurer general of the state declared that law 12.406 was unconstitutional. On 10 June 2009 a judgement upheld the finding of unconstitutionality. The Jureia-Itatins Mosaic was suspended in 2009.

=== Second version ===
Law 14.982 of 8 April 2013 again altered the limits of the Jureia-Itatins Ecological Station, re-categorising some areas. These were the 5,040 hectares (12,500 acres) Itinguçu State Park, the 1,828 hectares (4,520 acres) Prelado State Park, the 1,487 hectares (3,670 acres) Barra do Una Sustainable Development Reserve and the 3,953 hectares (9,770 acres) Despraiado Sustainable Development Reserve. The Jureia-Itatins Ecological Station now covered 84,425 hectares (208,620 acres). The law recreated the Jureia-Itatins Mosaic, this time covering 97,213 hectares (240,220 acres).

The process of preparing management plans for the units in the mosaic restarted in September 2015 with a series of meetings with people of the mosaic. 27 workshops were scheduled, involving all the stakeholders.

== Sources ==
- ESEC Juréia-Itatins (in Portuguese), ISA: Instituto Socioambiental
- Estação Ecológica da Juréia-Itatins (in Portuguese), SAP: Sistema Ambiental Paulista, archived from the original on 2016-08-17
- Fabio Zanchi (2012), "Mosaico da Juréia", Eco Juréia (in Portuguese)
- Mosaico da Jureia-Itatins reinicia elaboração dos planos de manejo (in Portuguese), SAP: Sistema Ambiental Paulista, 11 September 2015
- PES do Prelado (in Portuguese), ISA: Instituto Socioambiental
- Serra, José; Neto, Francisco Graziano; Neto, José Amaral Wagner (August 2009), Mosaico Juréia–Itatins Lei nº 12.406 (PDF) (in Portuguese)
