= Despraiado Sustainable Development Reserve =

Sustainable development reserve in Brazil

- Reserva de Desenvolvimento Sustentável do Despraiado
- IUCN category VI (protected area with sustainable use of natural resources)
- Location within Brazil
- Nearest city: Iguape, São Paulo
- Coordinates: 24.399°S 47.367°W
- Area: 3,953 hectares (9,770 acres)
- Designation: Sustainable development reserve
- Created: 12 December 2006

The Despraiado Sustainable Development Reserve (Portuguese: Reserva de Desenvolvimento Sustentável do Despraiado) is a sustainable development reserve in the state of São Paulo, Brazil.

== Location ==
The Despraiado Sustainable Development Reserve is divided between the municipalities of Iguape (95.36%), Miracatu (1.01%) and Pedro de Toledo (3.6%) in the state of São Paulo. The reserve extends along the Espraiado River. It is almost completely surrounded by the Juréia-Itatins Ecological Station.

== History ==
The Juréia-Itatins Mosaic of conservation units was created by law 12.406 of 12 December 2006. It included the Juréia-Itatins Ecological Station and the newly created Itinguçu and Prelado state parks, Despraiado and Barra do Una sustainable development reserves and the Ilhas do Abrigo e Guararitama Wildlife Refuge. The state parks and sustainable development reserves were carved out of the ecological station. On 11 September 2007 the procurer general of the state declared that law 12.406 was unconstitutional. On 10 June 2009 a judgement upheld the finding of unconstitutionality.

Law 14.982 of 8 April 2013 again altered the limits of the Juréia-Itatins Ecological Station, re-categorising some areas. These included the 3,953 hectares (9,770 acres) Despraiado Sustainable Development Reserve. The law recreated the Jureia-Itatins Mosaic, this time covering 97,213 hectares (240,220 acres).

== Sources ==
- Estação Ecológica da Juréia-Itatins (in Portuguese), SAP: Sistema Ambiental Paulista, archived from the original on 2016-08-17
- "Estação Ecológica Juréia-Itatins", Wikiaves (in Portuguese)
- Fabio Zanchi (2012), "Mosaico da Juréia", Eco Juréia (in Portuguese)
- PES do Prelado (in Portuguese), ISA: Instituto Socioambiental
- RDS do Despraiado (in Portuguese), ISA: Instituto Socioambeintal
- Serra, José; Neto, Francisco Graziano; Neto, José Amaral Wagner (August 2009), Mosaico Juréia–Itatins Lei nº 12.406 (PDF) (in Portuguese)
