= Cacunduva River =

- Location within Brazil
- Native name: Rio Cacunduva (Portuguese)

Location
- Country: Brazil

Physical characteristics
- Mouth
  - coordinates: 24.435722°S 47.170924°W

Basin features
- River system: Una do Prelado River

The Cacunduva River (Portuguese: Rio Cacunduva) is a river in the state of São Paulo, Brazil. It is a tributary of the Una do Prelado River.

== Course ==
The Cacunduva River is the main tributary of the Una do Prelado River, the largest in the 84,425 hectares (208,620 acres) Juréia-Itatins Ecological Station, a strictly protected area of well-preserved Atlantic Forest created in 1986. The Una do Prelado rises in the Banhado Grande region to the south-west of the Serra da Juréia, and meanders in a north-east direction parallel to the Atlantic coast for 80 kilometres (50 mi) through a low plain between the Serra dos Itatins and the Serra da Juréia. The Cacunduva is fed by streams from the Serra dos Itatins, flows east and joins the Una do Prelado from the left (north).

== See also ==
- List of rivers of São Paulo

== Sources ==
- ESEC Juréia-Itatins (in Portuguese), ISA: Instituto Socioambiental
- Mamede, Maria Candida H.; Cordeiro, Inês; Rossi, Lucia (2014), Juréia-Itatins Ecological Station (in Portuguese), Secretaria de Estado do Meio Ambiente, Instituto de Botânica, archived from the original on 2016-06-02
