= Rio Verde (São Paulo) =

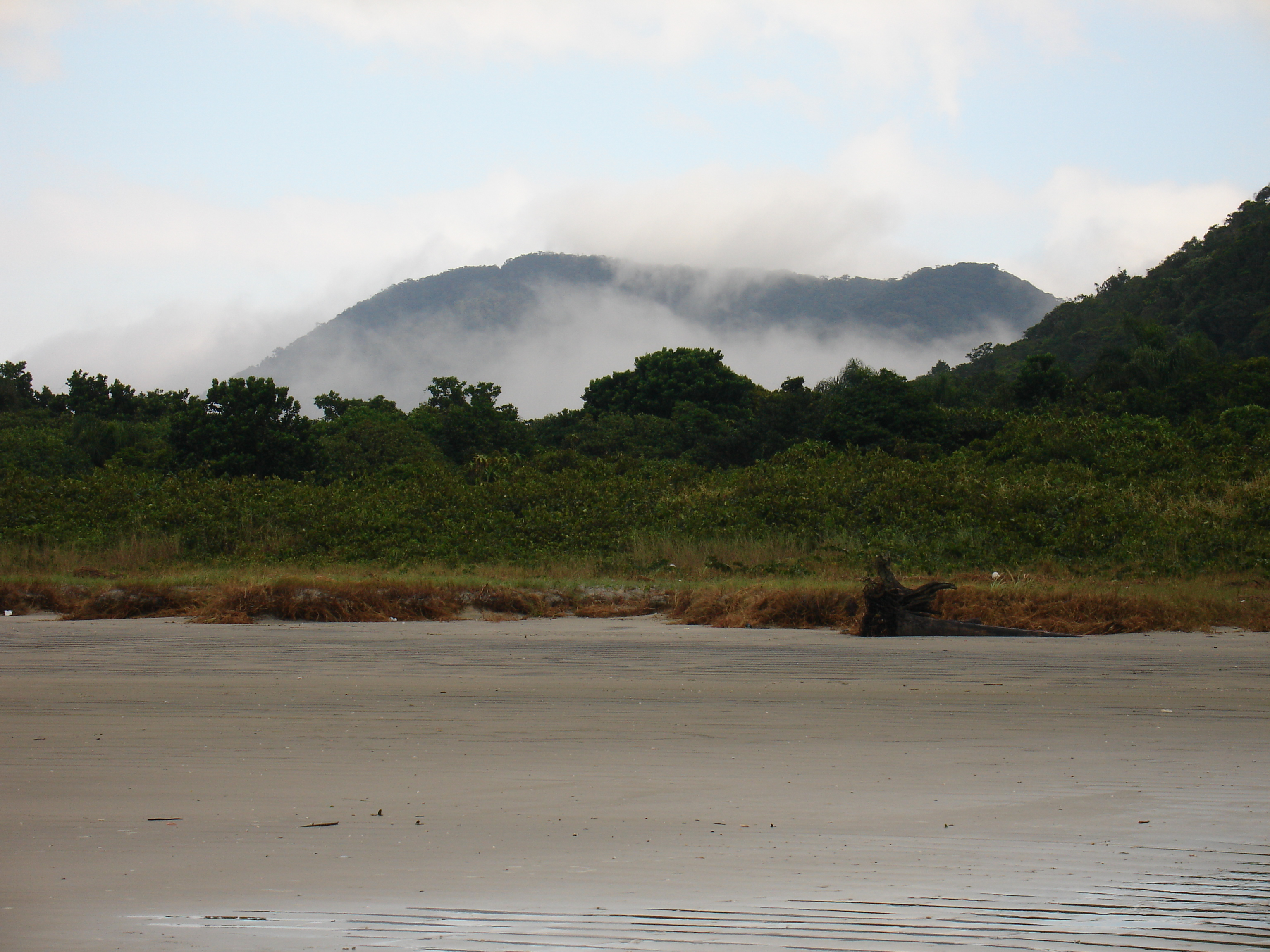
- Jureia Massif, Rio Verde Beach

- Location within Brazil

Location
- Country: Brazil

Physical characteristics
- Source
  - location: Juréia Massif, São Paulo state
- Mouth
  - location: Atlantic Ocean
  - coordinates: 24.558916°S 47.227928°W

The Rio Verde (Portuguese for "green river") is a river of São Paulo state in southeastern Brazil.

== Course ==
The Rio Verde basin is in the Juréia-Itatins Ecological Station, in the municipality of Iguape, São Paulo. The river rises in the Juréia Massif, which descends steeply to the Atlantic Ocean to the south east. The Rio Verde has clear water fed by the waterfalls of Juréia.

== Conservation ==
In the late 1970s the Department of the Environment planned to develop a "green" housing project on the banks of the Rio Verde. The project was cancelled in the 1980s when the Empresa Nuclebrás Brasileira decided to build the Iguape 4 and Iguape 5 power plants in a 23,600 hectares (58,000 acres) area that included the entire Serra da Juréia. By law, the area surrounding the nuclear power plant would have to be made an ecological station. The power plant project was abandoned but the Juréia-Itatins Ecological Station was created on 20 January 1986, covering the Juréia Massif and the entire watershed of the Una do Prelado River.

== See also ==
- List of rivers of São Paulo

== Sources ==
- Estação Ecológica da Juréia-Itatins (in Portuguese), SAP: Sistema Ambiental Paulista, archived from the original on 2016-08-17
- Fabio Zanchi (2012), "Estação Ecológica Juréia-Itatins", Eco Juréia (in Portuguese)
- Mamede, Maria Candida H.; Cordeiro, Inês; Rossi, Lucia (2014), Juréia-Itatins Ecological Station (in Portuguese), Secretaria de Estado do Meio Ambiente, Instituto de Botânica, archived from the original on 2016-06-02
