= Ilhas do Abrigo e Guararitama Wildlife Refuge =

- Refúgio de Vida Silvestre das Ilhas do Abrigo e Guararitama
- IUCN category III (natural monument or feature)
- Location within Brazil
- Nearest city: Peruíbe, São Paulo
- Coordinates: 24.382740°S 46.987057°W
- Area: 481 hectares (1,190 acres)
- Designation: Wildlife refuge
- Created: 8 April 2013
- Administrator: Fundação para Conservação e a Produção Florestal do Estado de São Paulo

The Ilhas do Abrigo e Guararitama Wildlife Refuge (Portuguese: Refúgio de Vida Silvestre das Ilhas do Abrigo e Guararitama is a wildlife refuge off the south coast of the state of São Paulo Brazil.

== Location ==
The Ilhas do Abrigo e Guararitama Wildlife Refuge is in the Atlantic Ocean to the east of Peruíbe, São Paulo. It covers the islands of Bom Abrigo and Guararitama and a rectangular area of sea surrounding them with a total area of 481 hectares (1,190 acres). The land area is 11 hectares (27 acres) and the sea area is 470 hectares (1,200 acres). The refuge is opposite the mouth of the Guaraú River. The Itinguçu State Park is to the southeast.

== Environment ==
The islands have no beaches, but are surrounded by rocky headlands. Their vegetation is Atlantic Forest. They provide food, shelter and nesting sites for many bird species including the kelp gull (Larus dominicanus), royal tern (Thalasseus maximus) and South American tern (Sterna hirundinacea). Abrigo island is an important resting place for the magnificent frigatebird (Fregata magnificens).

== History ==
The Juréia-Itatins Mosaic of conservation units was created by law 12.406 of 12 December 2006. It included the Juréia-Itatins Ecological Station and the newly created Itinguçu and Prelado state parks, the Despraiado and Barra do Una sustainable development reserves and the Ilhas do Abrigo e Guararitama Wildlife Refuge. The new units were carved out of the ecological station. On 11 September 2007 the procurer general of the state declared that law 12.406 was unconstitutional. On 10 June 2009 a judgement upheld the finding of unconstitutionality.

Law 14.982 of 8 April 2013 again altered the limits of the Juréia-Itatins Ecological Station, re-categorising some areas. These again included the Ilhas do Abrigo e Guararitama Wildlife Refuge. The law recreated the Jureia-Itatins Mosaic, this time covering 97,213 hectares (240,220 acres).

== Sources ==
- Estação Ecológica da Juréia-Itatins (in Portuguese), SAP: Sistema Ambiental Paulista, archived from the original on 2016-08-17
- Fabio Zanchi (2012), "Mosaico da Juréia", Eco Juréia (in Portuguese)
- Geraldo Alckmin (13 February 2012), PROJETO DE LEI Nº 60, DE 2012 (PDF) (in Portuguese), São Paulo
- "Mosaico de áreas protegidas aumentará território da Juréia-Itatins para 117 mil ha", Panorama Ambiental, São Paulo (SP) – Brasil, June 2006
- PES do Prelado (in Portuguese), ISA: Instituto Socioambiental
- Refúgio de Vida Silvestre Abrigo e Guararitama (PDF) (in Portuguese), Secretaria do Meio Ambiente SP
- RVS do Ilhas do Abrigo e Guararitama (in Portuguese), ISA:Instituto Socioambiental
- Serra, José; Neto, Francisco Graziano; Neto, José Amaral Wagner (August 2009), Mosaico Juréia–Itatins Lei nº 12.406 (PDF) (in Portuguese)
