= Guaraú River =

- Location within Brazil
- Native name: Rio Guaraú (Portuguese)

Location
- Country: Brazil

Physical characteristics
- Mouth
  - location: Atlantic Ocean
  - coordinates: 24.379334°S 47.019120°W

The Guaraú River (Portuguese: Rio Guaraú) is a river in the state of São Paulo, Brazil.

== Course ==
The basin of the Guaraú River is in the Juréia-Itatins Ecological Station. The river flows eastward along the foot of the Serra dos Itatins and enters the Atlantic Ocean to the west of Peruíbe. It separates the Itinguçu State Park to the south from the Balneário Garça Vermelha to the north. The 5,040 hectares (12,500 acres) state park was created in 2006 to support ecotourism.

== See also ==
- List of rivers of São Paulo

== Sources ==
- "Em Peruíbe (SP) o Parque Estadual do Itinguçu recebe visitantes de todas as partes do mundo", Expresso Regional (in Portuguese), 26 September 2013
- "Estação Ecológica Juréia-Itatins", Wikiaves (in Portuguese)
- Estação Ecológica da Juréia-Itatins (in Portuguese), SAP: Sistema Ambiental Paulista, archived from the original on 2016-08-17
