= Prelado State Park =

Park in São Paulo, Brazil

- Parque Estadual do Prelado
- IUCN category II (national park)
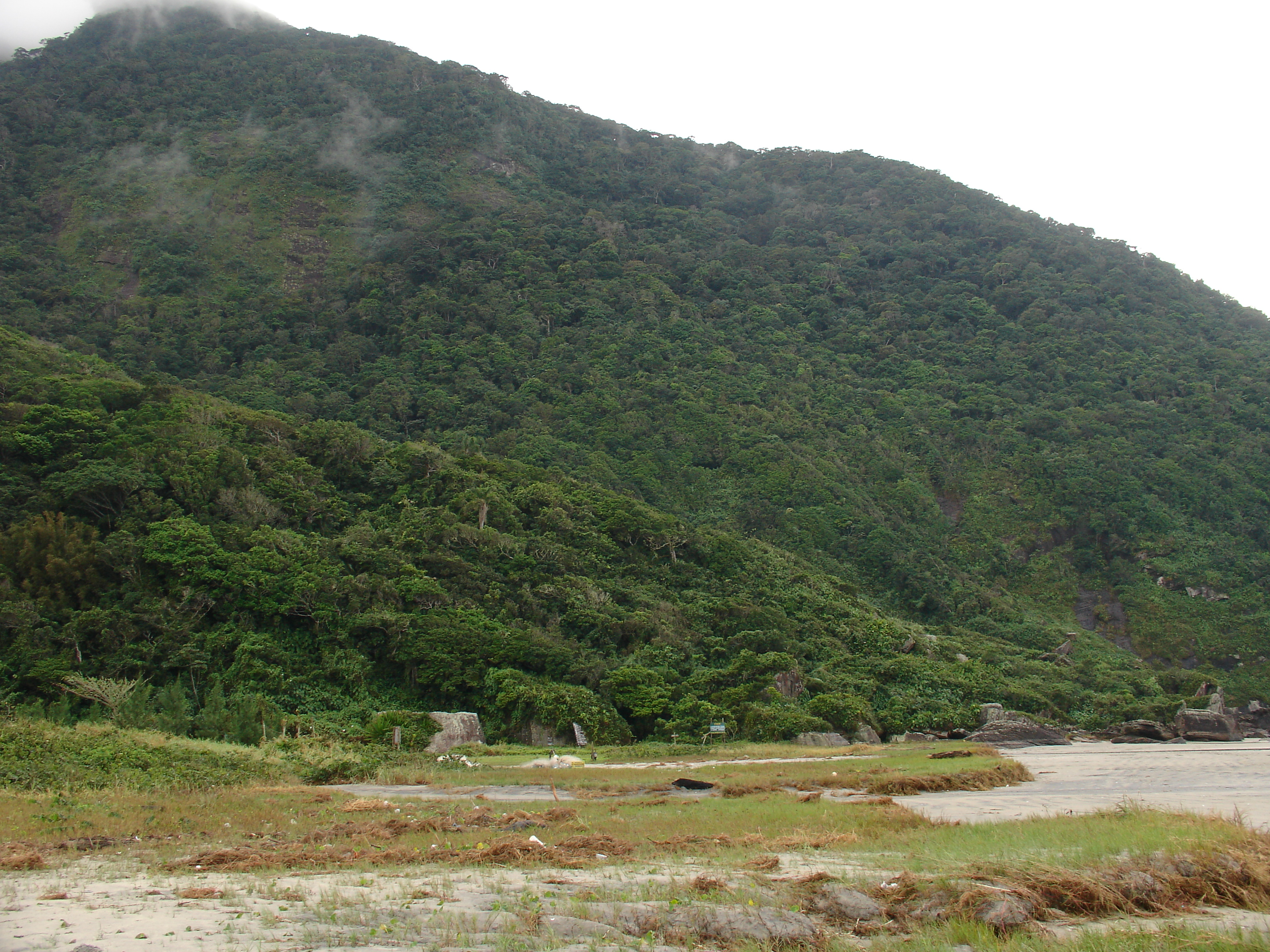
- The Juréia Massif from the Prelado State Park

- Location within Brazil Location within São Paulo state
- Nearest city: Iguape, São Paulo
- Coordinates: 24°34′55″S 47°17′17″W
- Area: 1,828 hectares (4,520 acres)
- Designation: State park
- Created: 12 December 2006
- Administrator: Fundação para Conservação e a Produção Florestal do Estado de São Paulo

The Prelado State Park (Portuguese: Parque Estadual do Prelado) is a state park in the state of São Paulo, Brazil.

== Location ==
The Prelado State Park is in the municipality of Iguape, São Paulo. It has an area of 1,828 hectares (4,520 acres). It is in the Atlantic Forest biome. The park is classed as IUCN protected area category II (national park), with the objectives of preserving natural ecosystems of great ecological relevance and scenic beauty, enabling scientific research and developing educational activities, environmental interpretation, recreation in contact with nature and eco-tourism.

== History ==
The Prelado State Park was created by decree 12.406 of the governor of São Paulo on 12 December 2006 from part of the Juréia-Itatins Ecological Station along the Juréia beach in the municipality of Iguape, including part of the coastal sea. The decree created the Juréia-Itatins Mosaic of conservation units with about 110,000 hectares (270,000 acres). It included the Juréia-Itatins Ecological Station, Itinguçu and Prelado state parks, Despraiado and Barra do Una sustainable development reserves and the Ilhas do Abrigo e Guararitama Wildlife Refuge. On 11 September 2007 the procurer general of the state declared that the decree was unconstitutional. The Juréia-Itatins Mosaic was suspended in 2009.

Law 14982 of 8 April 2013 altered the limits of the Juréia-Itatins Ecological Station, re-categorising some areas. These were the 5,040 hectares (12,500 acres) Itinguçu State Park, 1,828 hectares (4,520 acres) Prelado State Park, 1,487 hectares (3,670 acres) Barra do Una Sustainable Development Reserve and 3,953 hectares (9,770 acres) Despraiado Sustainable Development Reserve. The law recreated the 97,213 hectares (240,220 acres) Jureia-Itatins Mosaic.

== Sources ==
- ESEC Juréia-Itatins (in Portuguese), ISA: Instituto Socioambiental
- Estação Ecológica da Juréia-Itatins (in Portuguese), SAP: Sistema Ambiental Paulista, archived from the original on 2016-08-17
- PES do Prelado (in Portuguese), ISA: Instituto Socioambiental
- Unidade de Conservação: Parque Estadual do Prelado (in Portuguese), MMA: Ministério do Meio Ambiente
