= Jureia-Itatins Ecological Station =

Ecological station in São Paulo, Brazil

- Estação Ecológica da Jureia-Itatins
- IUCN category Ia (strict nature reserve)
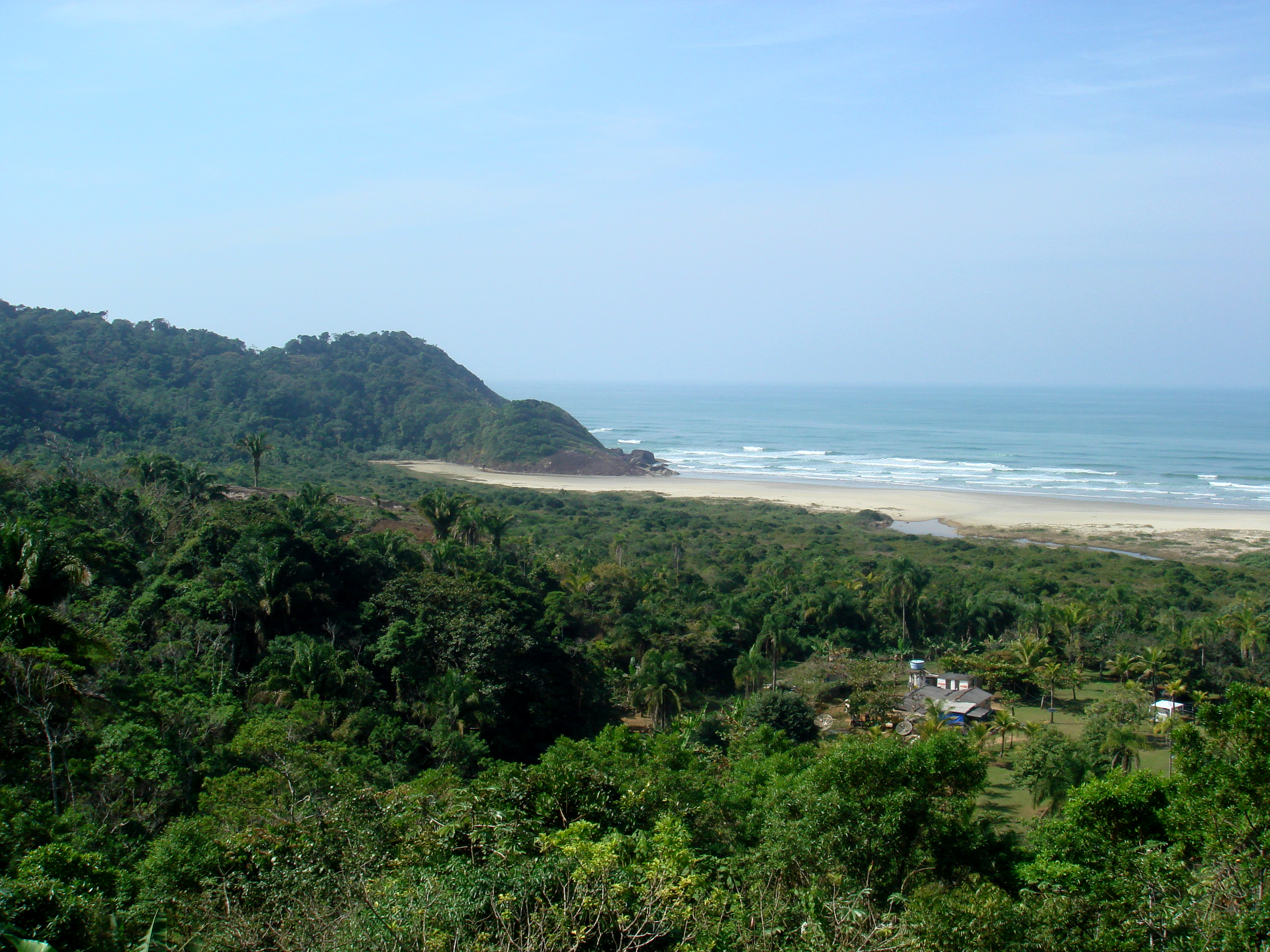
- Barra do Una beach in the Jureia-Itatins ESEC

- Location within Brazil
- Nearest city: Iguape, São Paulo
- Coordinates: 24.468°S 47.299°W
- Area: 84,425 hectares (208,620 acres)
- Designation: Ecological station
- Created: 20 January 1986

The Jureia-Itatins Ecological Station (Portuguese: Estação Ecológica da Jureia-Itatins) is an ecological station (ESEC) in the state of São Paulo, Brazil. It fully protects a well-preserved area of Atlantic Forest and associated ecosystems along the coastal plain and mountains of the south of the state, home to endangered species of mammals and birds. There is however, some threat from illegal gathering of heart of palm.

== Location ==
The Jureia-Itatins Ecological Station (ESEC) is divided between the municipalities of Iguape (86.43%), Itariri (3.62%), Miracatu (5.59%), Peruíbe (4.19%) and Pedro de Toledo (0.17%) in the state of São Paulo. It covers an area of 84,425 hectares (208,620 acres).

The ESEC covers part of the coastal plain and mountains between Ilha Comprida to the southwest and Peruíbe to the east. It is east of the SP-322 highway and south of the BR-116 - BR-101 highway. The Despraiado Sustainable Development Reserve extends into the northwest part of the ESEC. The Prelado State Park on the coast adjoins the south part of the ESEC. The east of the park adjoins the Barra do Una Sustainable Development Reserve, Ilha do Ameixal Area of Relevant Ecological Interest and Itinguçu State Park. The Ilhas do Abrigo e Guararitama Wildlife Refuge is offshore to the east of the ESEC.

The coastal region of the ESEC contains the Serra da Jureia, an inselberg connected to the mainland by a sandy alluvial plain. It is bounded to the northeast by the Paranapu massif, part of the Serra dos Itatins. Altitudes range from 0 to 800 metres (0 to 2,625 ft) above sea level. The Una do Prelado River is the largest in the region, fed by various streams from the north side of the Serra da Jureia and the Atlantic side of the Serra dos Itatins. The river is tidal for most of its length. The ESEC also holds the basins of the Rio Verde and the Guaraú River.

== Environment ==
Average annual temperature ranges from 19.6 to 21.4 °C (67.3 to 70.5 °F). Average annual rainfall is 2,277.8 millimetres (89.68 in). The climate is tropical humid with no dry season. At least 30 millimetres (1.2 in) of rain falls in the driest month.

The main biome is Atlantic Forest, with ecosystems typically associated with it including pioneer formations of marine influence, beaches, salt marches, rocky shores and lowland and submontane rainforest. There are fields of open "campo" vegetation at the higher levels, and mangroves along the coast. It has one of the best preserved areas of Atlantic Forest in Brazil. Some of the beaches are sheltered between rock formations, while others have long stretches of fine sand. The ESEC provides a sanctuary for rare and threatened species of mammals and birds including spider monkey, jaguar, otter, capybara and tinamou.

The ESEC is mainly threatened by illegal gathering of heart of palm, and to a lesser degree by illegal logging and hunting.

== History ==
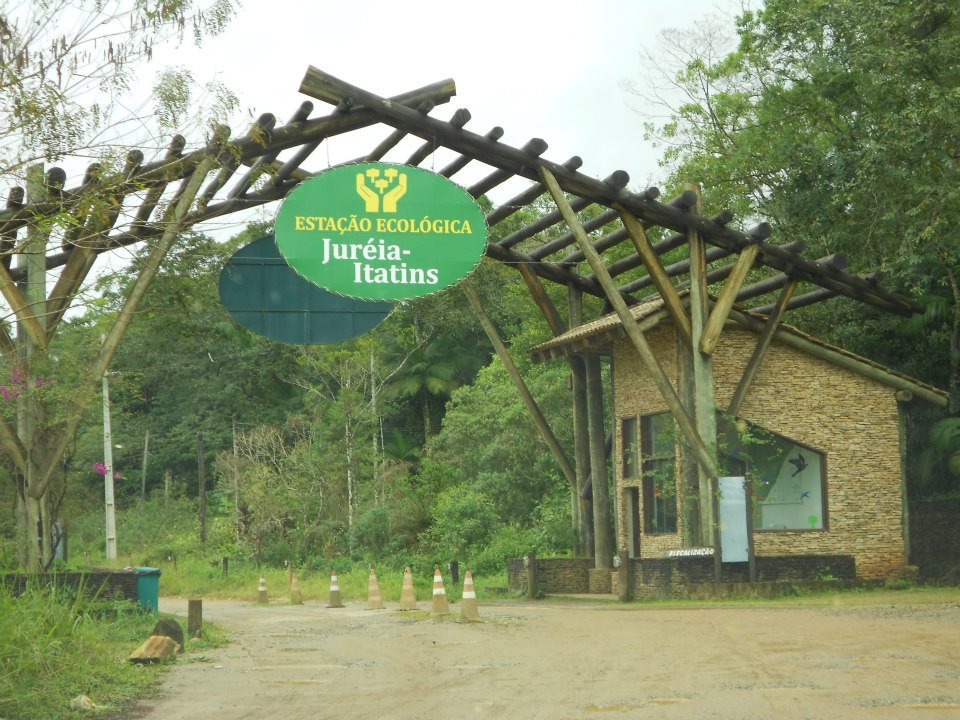
Entrance to the ESEC

The Serra dos Itatins State Forest Reserve, preserving a remnant of forest in the Serra dos Itatins, was created by decree 31.650 of 4 August 1958. Part of the Jureia area was chosen by NUCLEBRÁS in the 1980s for the site of two nuclear power plants, Iguape 4 and Iguape 5. NUCLEBRÁS withdrew from the area in 1985 and a campaign was launched to protect the forest.

On 20 January 1986 governor André Franco Montoro created the Jureia-Itatins Ecological Station by decree 24.646 with an area of about 82,000 hectares (200,000 acres) to ensure the integrity of the existing ecosystems. The ESEC incorporated the state forest reserve, lands declared vacant by the state and other lands along the coast of São Paulo state. The main objectives are preservation of nature and conducting scientific research. An area for the Guarani Indians was excluded, as was an area used for agrarian reform. The boundaries were redefined by law 5.649 of 28 April 1987.

Law 12.406 of 13 December 2006 redefined the boundaries of the ESEC and reclassified the areas of the Despraiado Sustainable Development Reserve, Itinguçu State Park, Prelado State Park and Barra do Una Sustainable Development Reserve. It also excluded the areas to the north of the ESEC that were now part of the Banhados de Iguape Ecological Station. The decree created the Jureia-Itatins Mosaic of conservation units with about 110,000 hectares (270,000 acres). It included the Jureia-Itatins Ecological Station, Itinguçu and Prelado state parks, Despraiado and Barra do Una sustainable development reserves and the Ilhas do Abrigo e Guararitama Wildlife Refuge. This law was declared unconstitutional by the Procurer General of Justice of São Paulo on 11 September 2007. The mosaic was suspended in 2009. A motion was passed on 29 June 2012 repudiating the order for 300 families of traditional residents to withdraw from the ESEC.

Law 14982 of 8 April 2013 again altered the limits of the ESEC, re-categorising some areas. These were the 5,040 hectares (12,500 acres) Itinguçu State Park, 1,828 hectares (4,520 acres) Prelado State Park, 1,487 hectares (3,670 acres) Barra do Una Sustainable Development Reserve and 3,953 hectares (9,770 acres) Despraiado Sustainable Development Reserve. The areas called Banhado Pequeno and Banhado Grande with 14,428 and 2,136 hectares (35,650 and 5,280 acres) in the Banhados de Iguape Ecological Station were incorporated in the ESEC, as was the area called Colinas Verdes (742 hectares). An area of 237 hectares (590 acres) to the north of the EXEC was excluded. The same law recreated the 97,213 hectares (240,220 acres) Jureia-Itatins Mosaic made up of the Jureia-Itatins ESEC, Itinguçu and Prelado state parks, Despraiado and Barra do Una sustainable development reserves and the Ilhas do Abrigo e Guararitama RVS. The ESEC as of 2016 had an area of 79,240 hectares (195,800 acres). It is part of the Lagamar mosaic.

== Sources ==
- ESEC Juréia-Itatins (in Portuguese), ISA: Instituto Socioambiental
- "Estação Ecológica Juréia-Itatins", Wikiaves (in Portuguese)
- Estação Ecológica da Juréia-Itatins (in Portuguese), SAP: Sistema Ambiental Paulista, archived from the original on 2016-08-17
- Mamede, Maria Candida H.; Cordeiro, Inês; Rossi, Lucia (2014), Juréia-Itatins Ecological Station (in Portuguese), Secretaria de Estado do Meio Ambiente, Instituto de Botânica, archived from the original on 2016-06-02
- Unidades de Conservação - Mosaico do Litoral Sul de São Paulo e do Litoral do Paraná - LAGAMAR (in Portuguese), ICMBio, archived from the original on 2019-05-27
