= Registro =

- Municipality
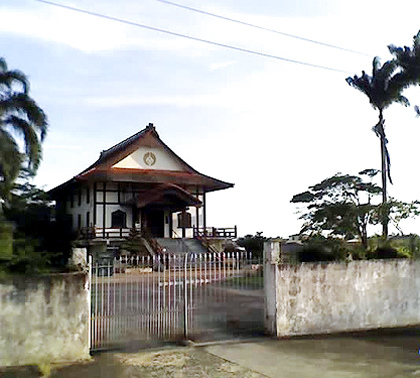

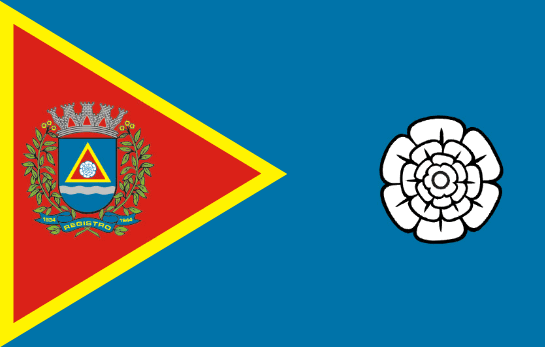
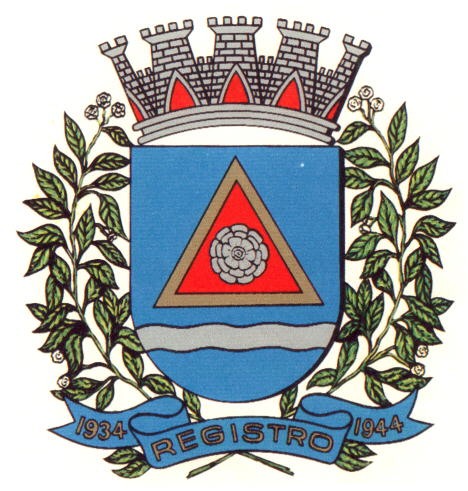
- Flag Coat of arms

- Location in São Paulo state

- Location in Brazil
- Coordinates: 24°29′15″S 47°50′37″W
- Country: Brazil
- Region: Southeast
- State: São Paulo

Area
  - Total: 722 km^{2} (279 sq mi)

Population (2020)
  - Total: 56,393
  - Density: 78.1/km^{2} (202/sq mi)
- Time zone: UTC-03:00 (BRT)
  - Summer (DST): UTC-02:00 (BRST)

Registro is a city near the Atlantic coast of São Paulo, Brazil. The population is 56,393 (2020 est.) in an area of 722 km^{2}. The elevation is 25 m. Registro in Portuguese means register, and this name was given to the city because it was the port from which the earlier settlers registered the gold that was leaving on ships from Brazil headed to Portugal.

== History ==
The municipality was created by state law in 1944.

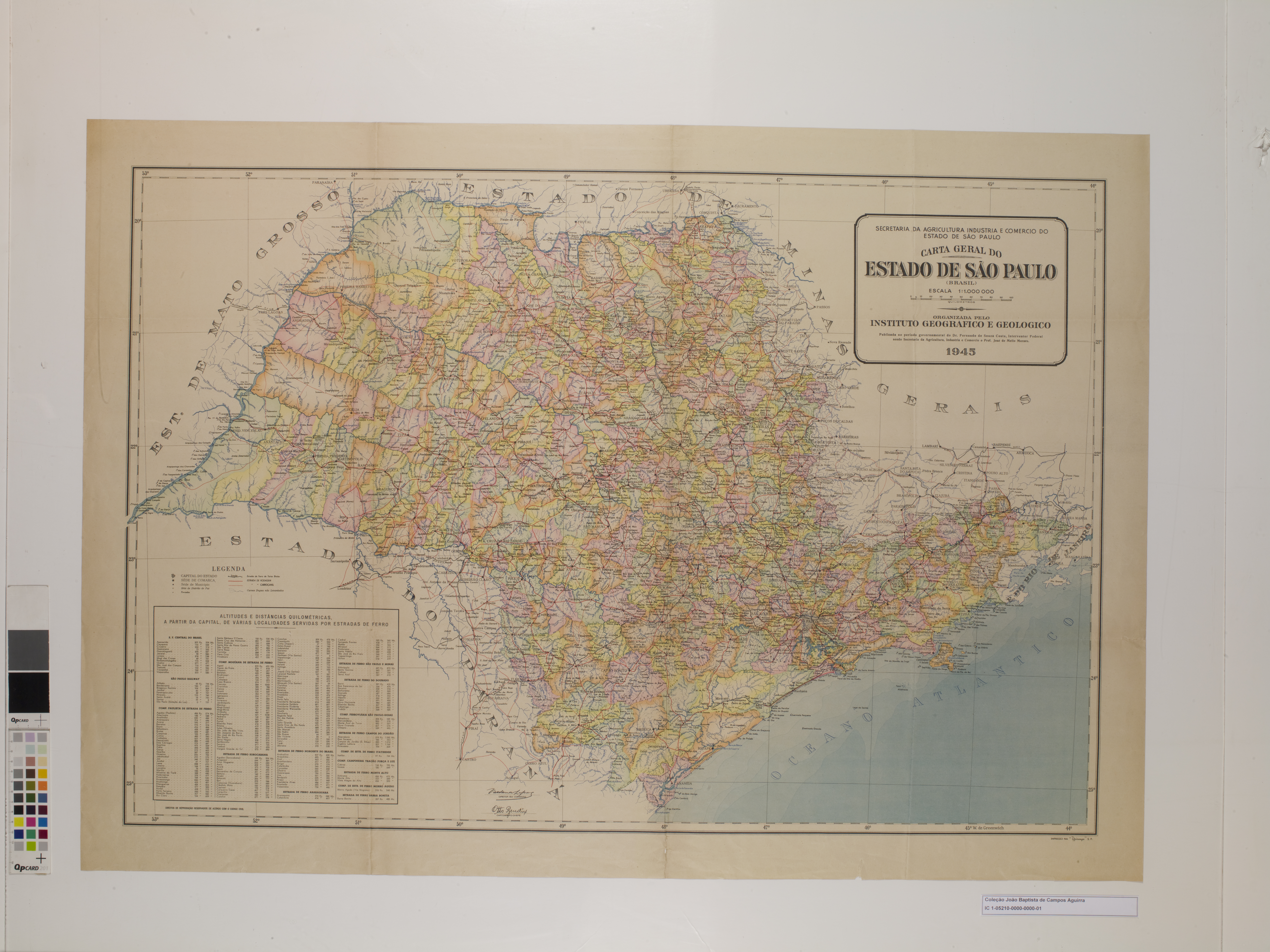
Map of the state of São Paulo (1944).

== Culture ==
International Cultural Events

Sushi Festival

Organized by an association of Japanese immigrants called “Associação Cultural Nipo Brasileira de Registro”, this festival offers music attractions and typical Japanese cuisine, like as: sushis and sashimis (tuna, salmon and a bunch of local fishes such as “robalo, tainha and manjuba.” This festival happens every year on June.

Tooro Nagashi

Since 2009 the “Associação Cultural Nipo-Brasileira de Registro” has been promoting in the beginning of August an event that pays tribute and remembers the World War II consequencies to the Japanese population, trying to take the attention of their youth about how is so important to maintain the state of peace, the culture of peace. Inspired by the atomic bomb victims that were dropped by the United States of America over two Japanese cities, with only 3 days of time space from the first one, Hiroshima and Nagasaki. Tooro means lantern of paper and nagashi means taking by the wind.

== Media ==
In telecommunications, the city was served by Companhia de Telecomunicações do Estado de São Paulo until 1975, when it began to be served by Telecomunicações de São Paulo. In July 1998, this company was acquired by Telefónica, which adopted the Vivo brand in 2012.

The company is currently an operator of cell phones, fixed lines, internet (fiber optics/4G) and television (satellite and cable).

== Transportation ==
Registro is served by Alberto Bertelli Airport.

== Sister city relations ==
- - Nakatsugawa, Gifu, Japan, since 1980

== Climate ==
Climate data for Registro (1995–2020 normals, extremes 1994–2022)
| Month | Jan | Feb | Mar | Apr | May | Jun | Jul | Aug | Sep | Oct | Nov | Dec | Year |
|---|---|---|---|---|---|---|---|---|---|---|---|---|---|
| Record high °C (°F) | 40.6 (105.1) | 40.7 (105.3) | 39.0 (102.2) | 37.6 (99.7) | 34.9 (94.8) | 33.3 (91.9) | 34.4 (93.9) | 37.3 (99.1) | 40.5 (104.9) | 43.0 (109.4) | 40.4 (104.7) | 41.1 (106.0) | 43.0 (109.4) |
| Mean daily maximum °C (°F) | 30.9 (87.6) | 31.3 (88.3) | 29.8 (85.6) | 28.3 (82.9) | 24.9 (76.8) | 23.3 (73.9) | 22.8 (73.0) | 23.7 (74.7) | 24.6 (76.3) | 26.0 (78.8) | 27.6 (81.7) | 30.0 (86.0) | 26.9 (80.5) |
| Daily mean °C (°F) | 26.4 (79.5) | 26.6 (79.9) | 25.5 (77.9) | 23.8 (74.8) | 20.7 (69.3) | 19.1 (66.4) | 18.4 (65.1) | 19.2 (66.6) | 20.4 (68.7) | 22.0 (71.6) | 23.3 (73.9) | 25.4 (77.7) | 22.6 (72.6) |
| Mean daily minimum °C (°F) | 21.8 (71.2) | 21.9 (71.4) | 21.1 (70.0) | 19.4 (66.9) | 16.4 (61.5) | 14.9 (58.8) | 14.1 (57.4) | 14.6 (58.3) | 16.3 (61.3) | 18.0 (64.4) | 19.0 (66.2) | 20.8 (69.4) | 18.2 (64.7) |
| Record low °C (°F) | 15.4 (59.7) | 16.6 (61.9) | 14.0 (57.2) | 10.0 (50.0) | 5.0 (41.0) | 1.0 (33.8) | 2.6 (36.7) | 6.0 (42.8) | 4.6 (40.3) | 9.4 (48.9) | 10.0 (50.0) | 13.2 (55.8) | 1.0 (33.8) |
| Average precipitation mm (inches) | 270.7 (10.66) | 224.8 (8.85) | 167.6 (6.60) | 79.8 (3.14) | 83.5 (3.29) | 79.0 (3.11) | 82.9 (3.26) | 57.8 (2.28) | 101.2 (3.98) | 121.1 (4.77) | 125.2 (4.93) | 169.1 (6.66) | 1,562.7 (61.53) |
| Average precipitation days (≥ 1.0 mm) | 19.4 | 15.5 | 16.8 | 11.7 | 12.7 | 11.5 | 11.7 | 10.9 | 13.6 | 15.9 | 15.3 | 16.3 | 171.3 |
Source: Centro Integrado de Informações Agrometeorológicas

== See also ==
- List of municipalities in São Paulo
