= Itariri =

- Municipality
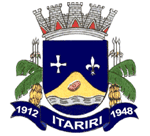
- Flag Coat of arms

- Location in São Paulo state

- Location in Brazil
- Coordinates: 24°17′20″S 47°10′26″W
- Country: Brazil
- Region: Southeast
- State: São Paulo

Area
  - Total: 273.67 km^{2} (105.66 sq mi)

Population (2020)
  - Total: 17,598
  - Density: 64.304/km^{2} (166.55/sq mi)
- Time zone: UTC−3 (BRT)
- Postal code: 11760-xxx
- Area code: (00)55-11
- Website: www.itariri.sp.gov.br

Itariri is a municipality in the state of São Paulo in Brazil. The population is 17,598 (2020 est.) in an area of 273.67 km^{2} (105.66 sq mi). The elevation is 55 m. Itariri is situated on the BR-101 highway, 18 km west of the coastal city Peruíbe.

== History ==
The municipality was created by state law in 1948.

Map of the state of São Paulo (1948).

== Geography ==
The municipality contains a small part of the 84,425 hectares (208,620 acres) Juréia-Itatins Ecological Station, a strictly protected area of well-preserved Atlantic Forest created in 1986.

== Media ==
In telecommunications, the city was served by Companhia de Telecomunicações do Estado de São Paulo until 1975, when it began to be served by Telecomunicações de São Paulo. In July 1998, this company was acquired by Telefónica, which adopted the Vivo brand in 2012.

The company is currently an operator of cell phones, fixed lines, internet (fiber optics/4G) and television (satellite and cable).

== See also ==
- List of municipalities in São Paulo
