= Ilha do Ameixal Area of Relevant Ecological Interest =

- Área de Relevante Interesse Ecológico Ilha do Ameixal
- IUCN category IV (habitat/species management area)
- Location within Brazil
- Nearest city: Peruíbe, São Paulo
- Coordinates: 24.424062°S 47.083215°W
- Area: 358.88 hectares (886.8 acres)
- Designation: Area of relevant ecological interest
- Created: 5 November 1985
- Administrator: Chico Mendes Institute for Biodiversity Conservation

The Ilha do Ameixal Area of Relevant Ecological Interest (Portuguese: Área de Relevante Interesse Ecológico Ilha do Ameixal) is an area of relevant ecological interest in the state of São Paulo, Brazil.

== Location ==
The Ilha do Ameixal Area of Relevant Ecological Interest (ARIE) lies in the municipality of Peruíbe, São Paulo. It has an area of 358.88 hectares (886.8 acres). The ARIE covers Ameixal island in the Una do Prelado River near its mouth on the Atlantic Ocean. The Itinguçu State Park lies to the west, north and east of this section of the river, and the Barra do Una Sustainable Development Reserve lies to the south of the island.

== Environment ==
Altitude ranges from 0 to 2 metres (0.0 to 6.6 ft) above sea level. Temperatures range from 4 to 40 °C (39 to 104 °F) with an average of 26 °C (79 °F). Average annual rainfall is 2,200 millimetres (87 in). The island is covered by mangrove vegetation. It is in the Atlantic Forest biome.

== History ==
The Ilha do Ameixal Area of Relevant Ecological Interest was created by presidential decree 91.889 of 5 November 1985. It is administered by the federal Chico Mendes Institute for Biodiversity Conservation (ICMBio). It is classed as IUCN protected area category IV (habitat/species management area). The conservation unit is part of the Lagamar mosaic.

== Sources ==
- Arie Ilha do Ameixal (in Portuguese), Chico Mendes Institute for Biodiversity Conservation
- Arie Ilha do Ameixal Mapa Interativo (in Portuguese), Chico Mendes Institute for Biodiversity Conservation
- "Estação Ecológica Juréia-Itatins", Wikiaves (in Portuguese)
- Unidade de Conservação: Área de Relevante Interesse Ecológico Ilha do Ameixal (in Portuguese), MMA: Ministério do Meio Ambiente
- Unidades de Conservação - Mosaico do Litoral Sul de São Paulo e do Litoral do Paraná - LAGAMAR (in Portuguese), ICMBio, archived from the original on 2019-05-27
