= Itinguçu State Park =

State park in São Paulo, Brazil

- Parque Estadual do Itinguçu
- IUCN category II (national park)
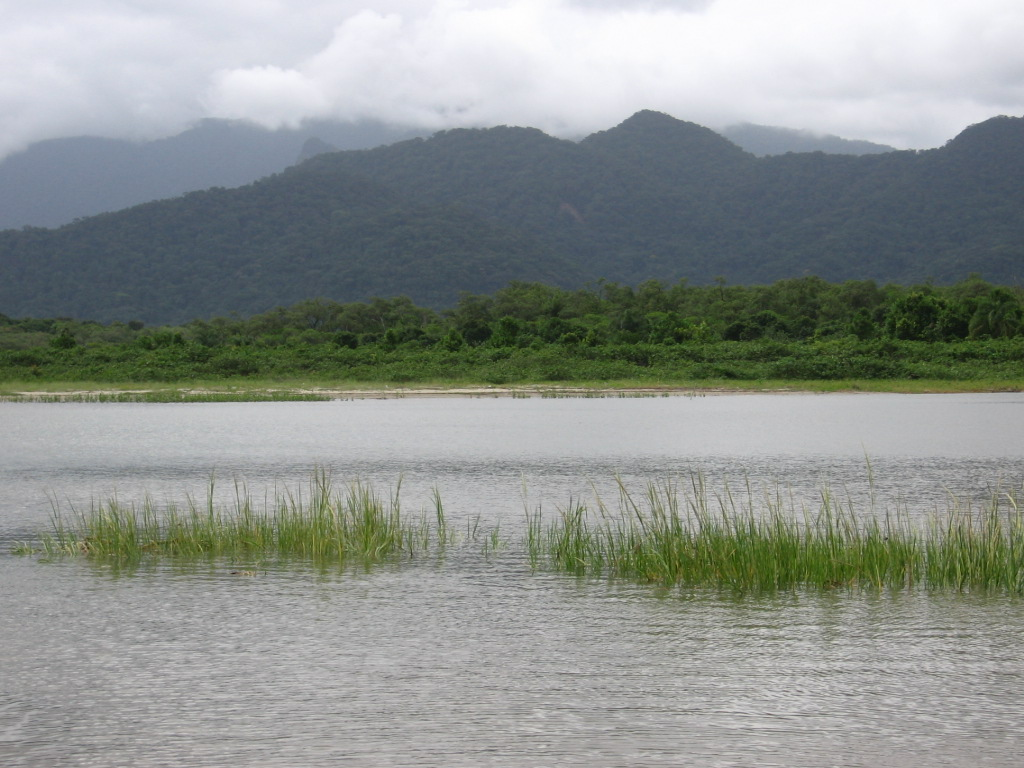
- Barra do Una (foreground) and Itinguçu State Park (hills)

- Location within Brazil
- Nearest city: Peruíbe, São Paulo
- Coordinates: 24.396888°S 47.063917°W
- Area: 5,040 hectares (12,500 acres)
- Designation: State park
- Created: 12 December 2006

The Itinguçu State Park (Portuguese: Parque Estadual do Itinguçu) is a state park in the state of São Paulo, Brazil.

== Location ==
The Itinguçu State Park covers a group of mountains along the Atlantic coast to the southwest of the town of Peruíbe. The park is in the municipality of Peruíbe on the south coast of São Paulo. It is divided into two sections. The Núcleo Itinguçu, a conservation unit in the Juréia-Itatins Mosaic of conservation units, receives most of the visitors. The Núcleo do Arpoador is only open for visits for the purpose of education or scientific research.

To the northeast the Guaraú River separates the park from the Balneário Garça Vermelha. The Atlantic Ocean forms the east and southeast boundary. The Ilhas do Abrigo e Guararitama Wildlife Refuge is offshore to the east. To the south it adjoins the Barra do Una Sustainable Development Reserve. To the west and northwest it adjoins the Juréia-Itatins Ecological Station (ESEC), separated from the ESEC by the Una do Prelado River. The Ilha do Ameixal Area of Relevant Ecological Interest, which lies between two arms of the Una do Prelado, intrudes into the state park.

== Environment and facilities ==
The Itinguçu State Park contains large areas of well-preserved Atlantic Forest, waterfalls, beaches, rocky shores, mangroves and salt marsh forest. It is rich in fauna, especially birds, including 30 species of hummingbirds and woodpeckers. The park has administrative facilities in the Guaraú Beach community, an auditorium with capacity for 40 people, a laboratory and a craft store. It is reached from there via the Guaraú Road. In the park itself there is parking, food kiosks and toilets. There are several marked trails with stairs and handrails. The park has the infrastructure to conduct educational programs, and provides environmental monitors for groups.

== History ==
The Juréia-Itatins Mosaic of conservation units was created by law 12.406 of 12 December 2006. It included the Juréia-Itatins Ecological Station and the newly created Itinguçu and Prelado state parks, the Despraiado and Barra do Una sustainable development reserves and the Ilhas do Abrigo e Guararitama Wildlife Refuge. The state parks and sustainable development reserves were carved out of the ecological station. On 11 September 2007 the procurer general of the state declared that law 12.406 was unconstitutional. On 10 June 2009 a judgement upheld the finding of unconstitutionality.

Law 14.982 of 8 April 2013 again altered the limits of the Juréia-Itatins Ecological Station, re-categorising some areas. These included the 5,040 hectares (12,500 acres) Itinguçu State Park. The law recreated the Jureia-Itatins Mosaic, which includes the park and other conservation units. The law defined the park as a "special zone of ecotourism interest". Work and activities in the park were to be mainly performed by the traditional residents of the conservation unit mosaic.

== Sources ==
- Alckmin, Geraldo; Covas Lopes, Bruno; Santos, Edson Aparecido dos (8 April 2013), Lei nº 14.982, de 8 de abril de 2013 (in Portuguese)
- "Em Peruíbe (SP) o Parque Estadual do Itinguçu recebe visitantes de todas as partes do mundo", Expresso Regional (in Portuguese), 26 September 2013
- Estação Ecológica da Juréia-Itatins (in Portuguese), SAP: Sistema Ambiental Paulista, archived from the original on 2016-08-17
- "Estação Ecológica Juréia-Itatins", Wikiaves (in Portuguese)
- ESEC Juréia-Itatins (in Portuguese), ISA: Instituto Socioambiental
- Fabio Zanchi (2012), "Mosaico da Juréia", Eco Juréia (in Portuguese)
- PES do Prelado (in Portuguese), ISA: Instituto Socioambiental
- Serra, José; Neto, Francisco Graziano; Neto, José Amaral Wagner (August 2009), Mosaico Juréia–Itatins Lei nº 12.406 (PDF) (in Portuguese)
