= Una do Prelado River =

- Location within Brazil
- Native name: Rio Una do Prelado (Portuguese)

Location
- Country: Brazil

Physical characteristics
- Source
  - location: São Paulo
- Mouth
  - location: Atlantic ocean
  - coordinates: 24.445548°S 47.079196°W

Basin features
- Tributaries
  - left: Cacunduva River

The Una do Prelado River (Portuguese: Una do Prelado River) is a river in the state of São Paulo, Brazil.

== Course ==
The Una do Prelado River is the largest in the 84,425 hectares (208,620 acres) Juréia-Itatins Ecological Station, a strictly protected area of well-preserved Atlantic Forest created in 1986. It rises in the Banhado Grande region to the south-west of the Serra da Juréia, and meanders in a north-east direction parallel to the Atlantic coast for 80 kilometres (50 mi) through a low plain between the Serra dos Itatins and the Serra da Juréia. Its main tributary is the Cacunduva River.

The final section in the east divides the Juréia-Itatins Ecological Station from the Itinguçu State Park, a 5,040 hectares (12,500 acres) conservation unit created in 2006. Near the sea the river separates into two branches which later recombine, enclosing the Ilha do Ameixal, which holds the Ilha do Ameixal Area of Relevant Ecological Interest. The Barra do Una lies at the river mouth, in the municipality of Peruíbe, the centre of the Barra do Una Sustainable Development Reserve.

The Una do Prelado River is a blackwater river fed by various streams from the north side of the Serra da Juréia and the Atlantic side of the Serra dos Itatins. The river is tidal for most of its length, with seawater reaching as far as 30 kilometres (19 mi) from its mouth in dry periods. There are mangrove swamps up to 5 kilometres (3.1 mi) from the estuary.

== See also ==
- List of rivers of São Paulo

== Sources ==
- ESEC Juréia-Itatins (in Portuguese), ISA: Instituto Socioambiental
- "Estação Ecológica Juréia-Itatins", Wikiaves (in Portuguese)
- Mamede, Maria Candida H.; Cordeiro, Inês; Rossi, Lucia (2014), Juréia-Itatins Ecological Station (in Portuguese), Secretaria de Estado do Meio Ambiente, Instituto de Botânica, archived from the original on 2016-06-02
