= Iguape =

- Municipality
- Municipality of Iguape
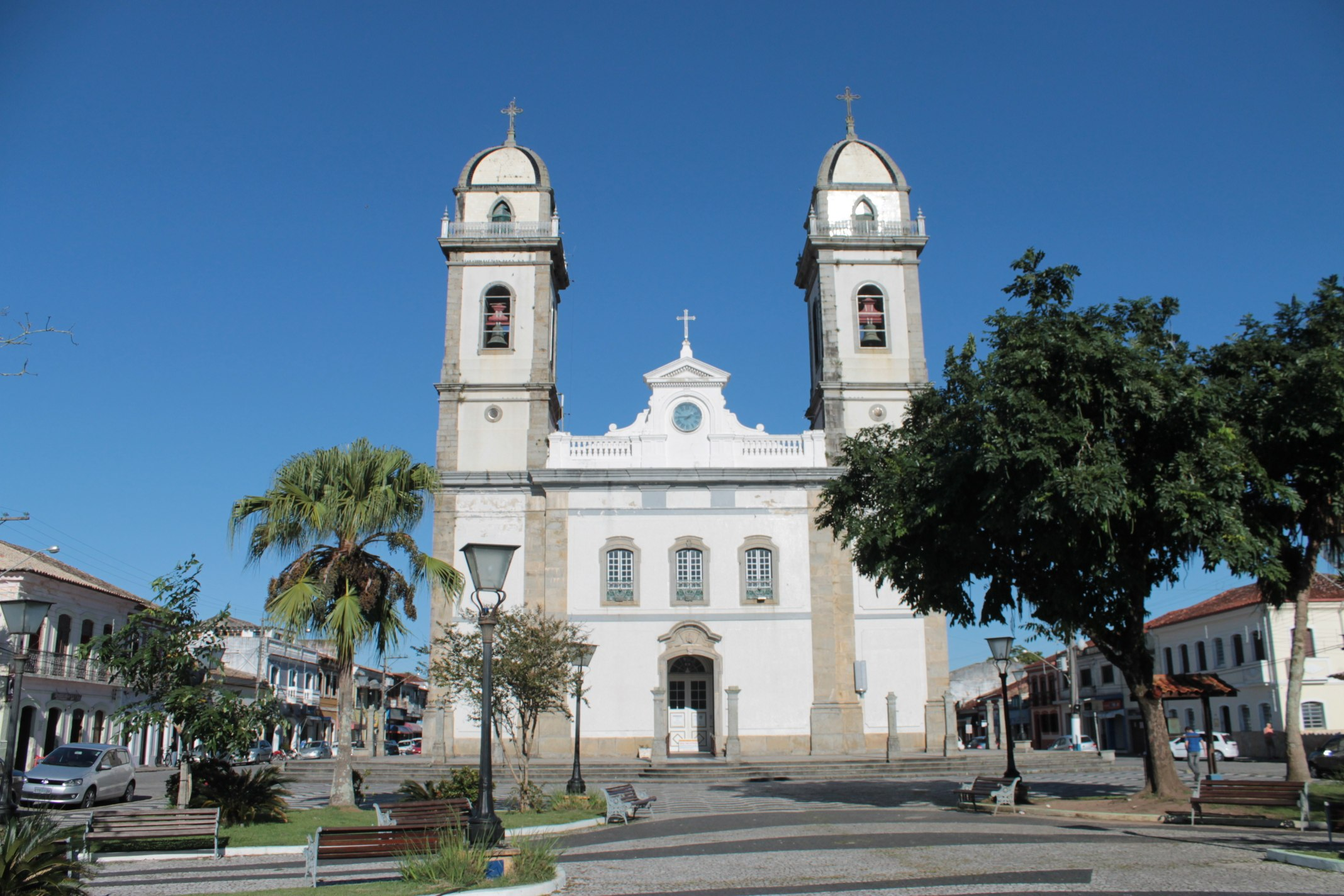
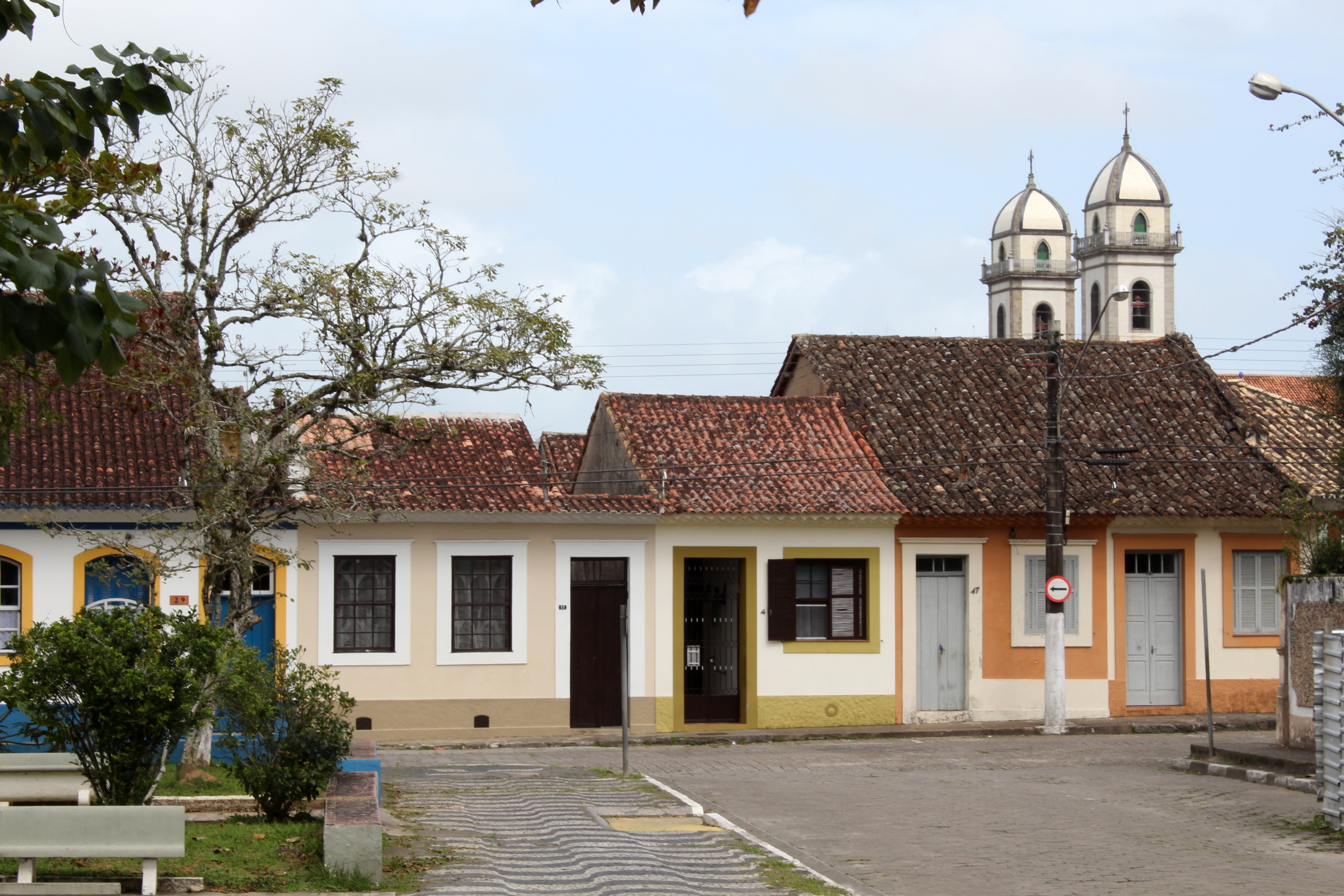
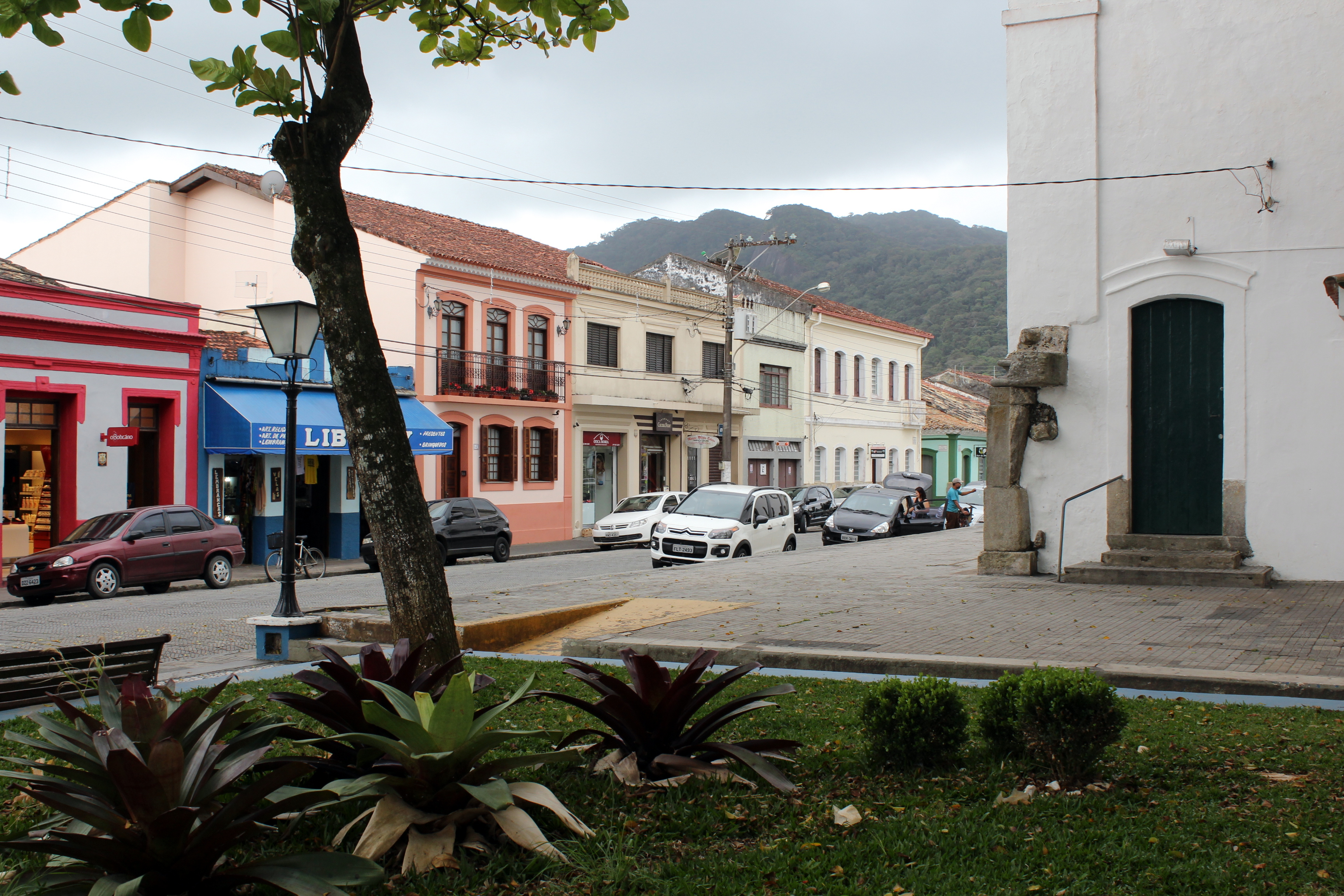
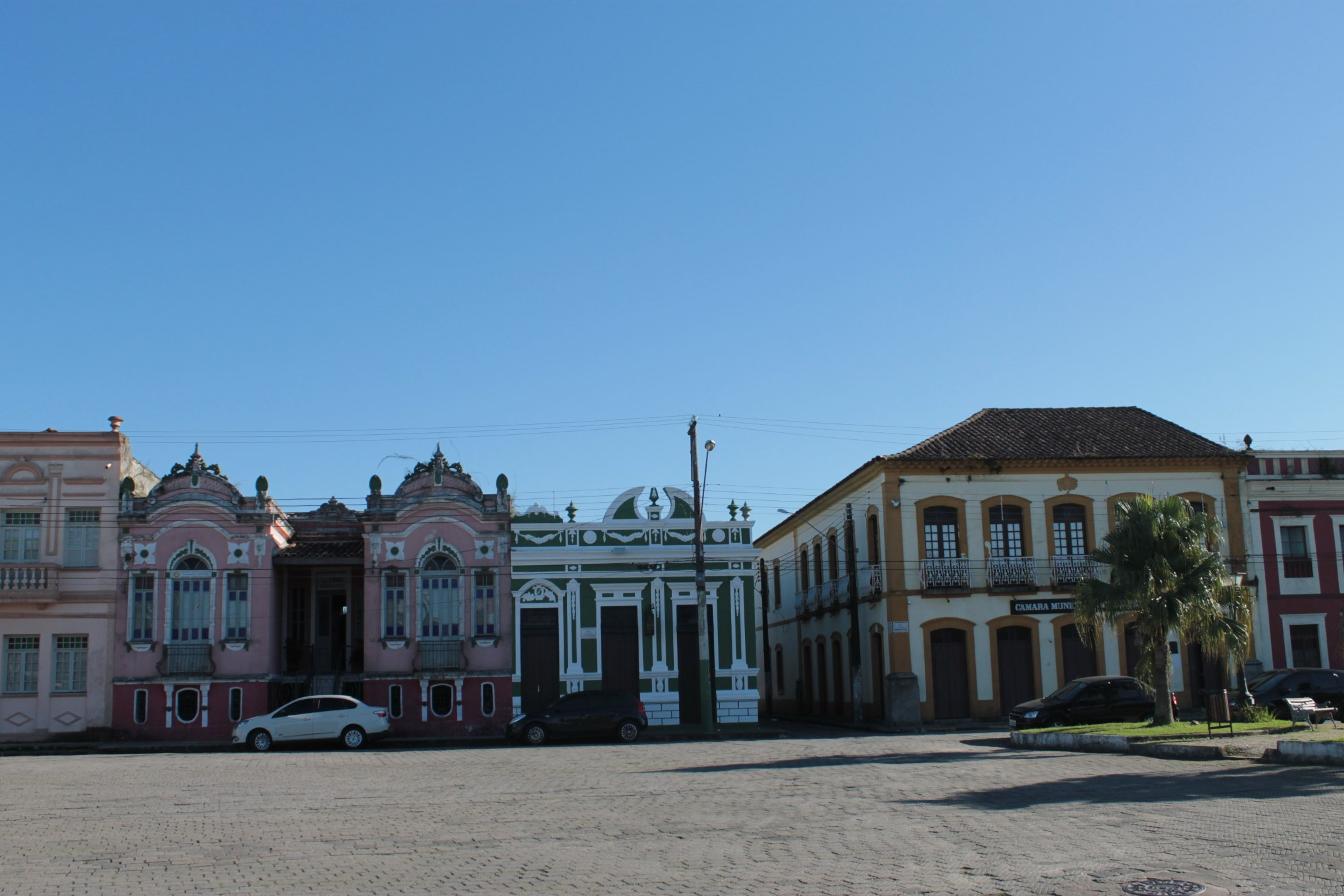
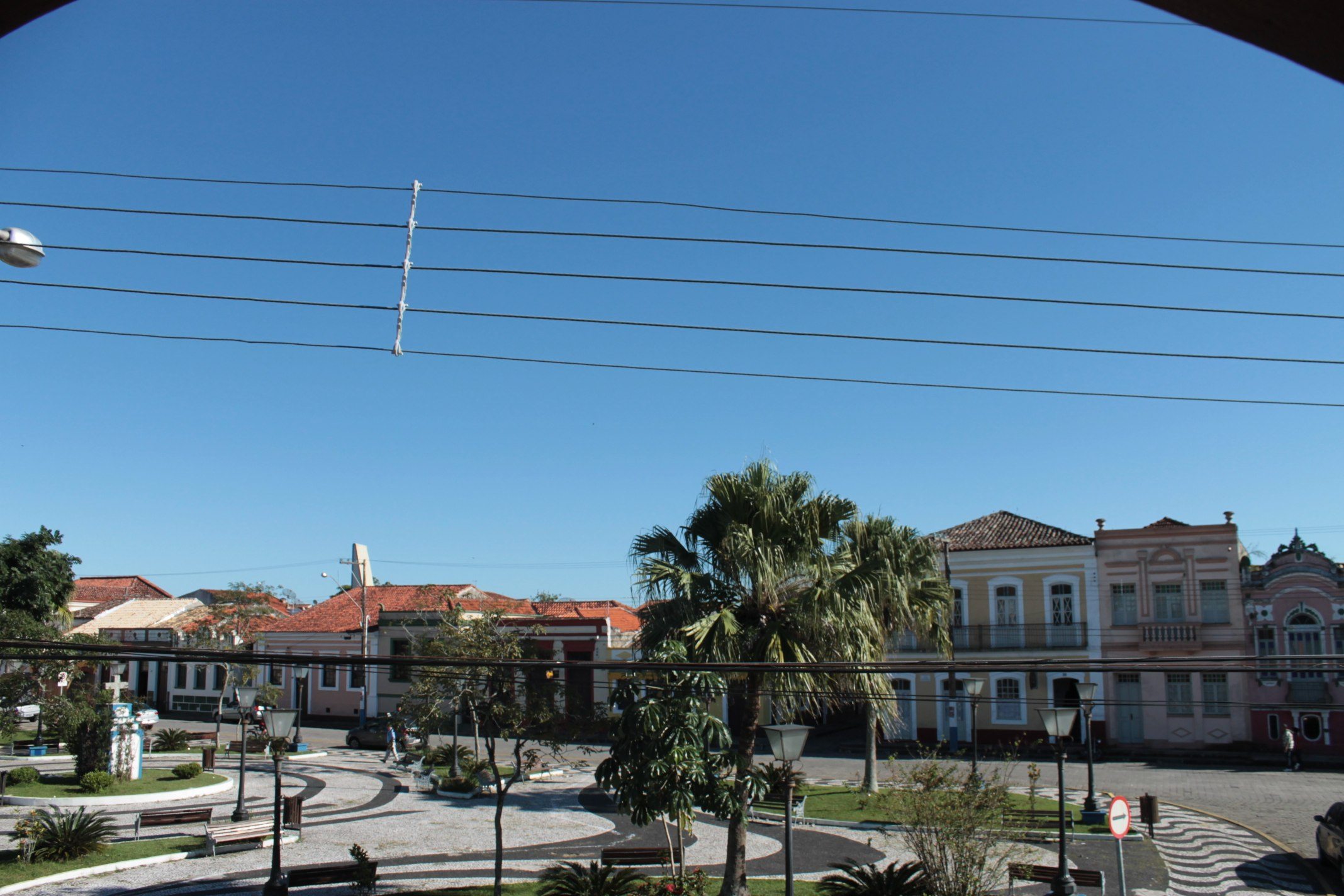
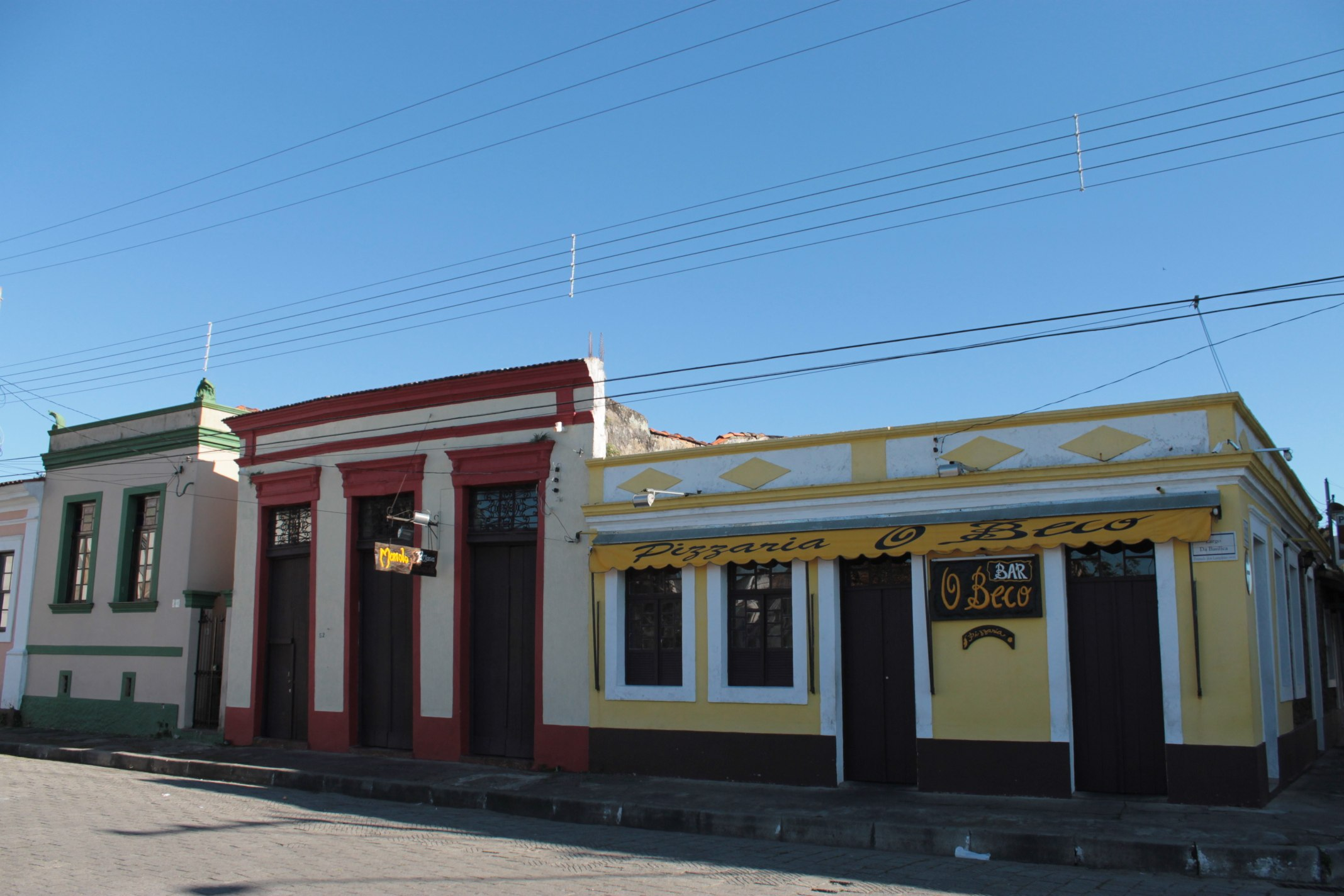
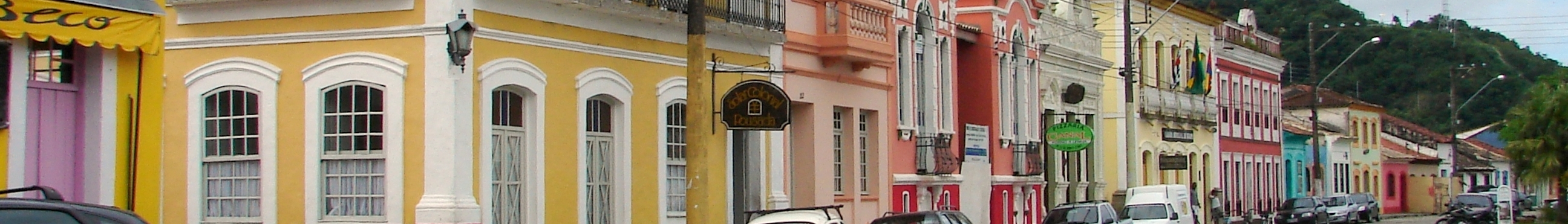

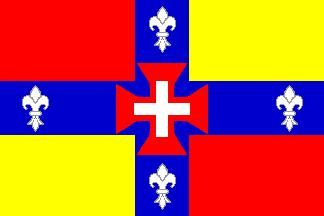
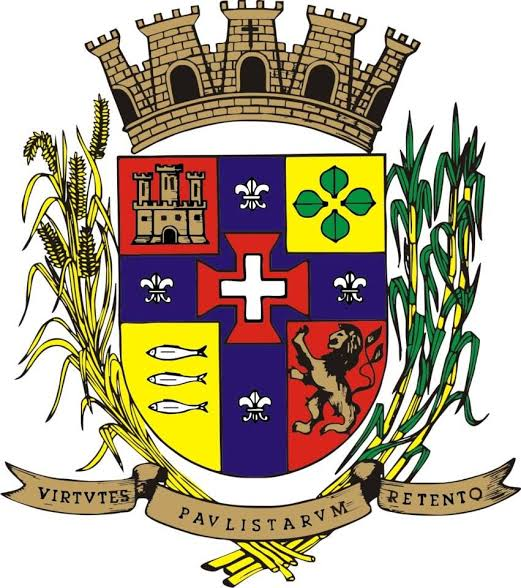
- Flag Coat of arms

- Location in São Paulo
- Coordinates: 24°42′29″S 47°33′19″W
- Country: Brazil
- Region: Southeast
- State: São Paulo
- Founded: December 3, 1538

Area
  - Total: 1,978 km^{2} (764 sq mi)
- Elevation: 3 m (9.8 ft)

Population (2020)
  - Total: 30,989
  - Density: 15.67/km^{2} (40.58/sq mi)
- Time zone: UTC−3 (BRT)
- Area code: +55 13
- HDI (2010): 0.726 – high
- Website: iguape.sp.gov.br/site

Iguape is a municipality located into the Ribeira Valley in the southern portion of the state of São Paulo, Brazil. The population is 30,989 (2020 estimate) in an area of 1,977.96 km^{2} (763.69 sq mi), making it the largest municipality area in São Paulo state. The city was officially founded on December 3, 1538, and its historic constructions are classified as national heritage by the IPHAN since 2009.

Its name has tupi origins and its translation means "in the river cove", 'y (water/river), kûá (cove) and pe (in).

== History ==
The extinct unclassified Jaguanan language was formerly spoken by indigenous peoples in Iguape.

Because of its location, close to the limits established by the Tordesillas Treaty, the Iguape region was the stage for constant disputes among Portuguese, Spanish, and French pirates who landed there in order to refill their vessels or to trade in their goods. The foundation of Iguape is sometimes attributed to Rui Garcia de Mosquera, a Spanish navigator and colonizer who established a good relationship with the Tupiniquin Indians.

In another unproved account, in 1498 a Spanish group landed in the region giving the name Iguape to a tiny village, in reference to a local Indian name for a common regional plant. Some years later, a French pirate vessel attacked Iguape and set fire to the village, destroying all official documentation. The veracity of those events is unknown, but there is no doubt that the first years of Iguape's history were strongly influenced by the presence of the Spanish.

=== Searching for gold ===
With the discovery of gold at the end of the 16th century, Iguape was increasingly visited by adventurers searching for gold along the rivers. In 1635, there already existed the so-called "Casa da Oficina Real", the first money producing institution in Brazil (today Iguape's local museum). The discovery of gold at Serra da Paranapiacaba, in the interior of Vale do Ribeira, intensified the navigation of the Ribeira de Iguape River resulting in the formation of new villages such as Registro, Eldorado Paulista, Iporanga, Jacupiranga and Sete Barras.

Around 1780, the gold cycle had come to an end and many families left the region.

=== Rice farming ===
Nevertheless, since the beginning of the 18th century the fertile grounds of the Ribeira valley were converted into large rice plantations. The rice, of an excellent quality, was intensively commercialized in Iguape and from there exported to Europe.

From 1820 to 1900, Iguape experienced a period of great prosperity reaching its economic peak. Five rice factories were working day and night, filling on average 10 large vessels per week. Banks were financing the business, six newspapers were circulated in the city, and France maintained a permanent consulate in the city. The population was accustomed to attending shows from Europe.

At that time, Iguape was as important as Rio de Janeiro or Salvador.

=== An ecological disaster ===
Consequently, the city had no difficulties in obtaining the necessary resources for the construction of one of the biggest and most controversial hydraulic installations on the Brazilian coast: the "Valo Grande" channel.

Aside from rice, other products from the Ribeira valley were transported by boat to a river port on the shore of the Ribeira river, close to Iguape, and from there by donkeys or carts to the ocean harbor, where they were loaded into big ships. To facilitate and cheapen transport, Iguape obtained permission from emperor D. Pedro II to build a 4 km long and 2 m wide channel, connecting the river port with the ocean port. The request was approved by D. Pedro and after hard work (by enslaved workers) the canal was concluded in 1855.

While meant to improve Iguape's economic conditions, the result was disastrous. The voluminous waters of the river, now with a shorter connection to the sea, washed away the sandy banks of the river, destroying both ports. Trade collapsed, resulting in rapid economic deterioration of the region. Most people had to leave Iguape, and those who decided to stay experienced serious difficulties, surviving by fishing and shrimping, much reduced in the coastal waters due to the large influx of fresh water.

== Geography ==
=== Location ===
Iguape is situated on the Atlantic Ocean coast, at the delta of the Ribeira de Iguape River.

The municipality contains 86% of the 84,425-hectare (208,620-acre) Juréia-Itatins Ecological Station, a strictly protected area of well-preserved Atlantic Forest created in 1986. It contains the 2,700-hectare (6,700-acre) Chauás Ecological Station, created in 1987. It also contains the 1,828-hectare (4,520-acre) Prelado State Park, created in 2006. The state park is just west of the Juréia Massif, an isolated group of mountains on the coast separated from the Serra dos Itatins by a sandy plain and the Una do Prelado River. Further east it contains 9% of the 1,487-hectare (3,670-acre) Barra do Una Sustainable Development Reserve, created in 2006. These conservation units are all part of the Juréia-Itatins Mosaic. The municipality contains 45% of the 455-hectare (1,120-acre) Guará Area of Relevant Ecological Interest, created in 2008.

=== Climate ===
According to the Köppen climate classification, Iguape has a humid subtropical climate (Cfa) that closely borders the tropical rainforest climate (Af). Summers are warm, humid and rainy, whilst winters are noticeably cooler and somewhat drier, although there is no true dry season. The mean temperature is 21.6 °C (70.9 °F) and the mean annual rainfall is 1,976 mm (77.8 in).

Climate data for Iguape (1981–2010 normals)
Month	Jan	Feb	Mar	Apr	May	Jun	Jul	Aug	Sep	Oct	Nov	Dec	Year
Record high °C (°F)	42.1 (107.8)	43.0 (109.4)	40.0 (104.0)	36.8 (98.2)	34.5 (94.1)	34.2 (93.6)	35.6 (96.1)	37.2 (99.0)	38.6 (101.5)	41.2 (106.2)	39.6 (103.3)	40.4 (104.7)	43.0 (109.4)
Mean daily maximum °C (°F)	29.3 (84.7)	30.2 (86.4)	29.0 (84.2)	27.4 (81.3)	24.7 (76.5)	23.4 (74.1)	22.6 (72.7)	23.0 (73.4)	23.0 (73.4)	24.8 (76.6)	26.9 (80.4)	28.3 (82.9)	26.1 (79.0)
Daily mean °C (°F)	25.1 (77.2)	25.5 (77.9)	24.6 (76.3)	22.9 (73.2)	19.9 (67.8)	18.4 (65.1)	17.6 (63.7)	18.1 (64.6)	19.0 (66.2)	21.1 (70.0)	22.9 (73.2)	23.9 (75.0)	21.6 (70.9)
Mean daily minimum °C (°F)	21.6 (70.9)	21.8 (71.2)	21.1 (70.0)	19.5 (67.1)	16.3 (61.3)	14.7 (58.5)	13.8 (56.8)	14.4 (57.9)	15.8 (60.4)	17.8 (64.0)	19.4 (66.9)	20.3 (68.5)	18.0 (64.4)
Record low °C (°F)	11.0 (51.8)	12.4 (54.3)	10.0 (50.0)	7.4 (45.3)	2.8 (37.0)	1.0 (33.8)	0.2 (32.4)	3.2 (37.8)	2.9 (37.2)	8.0 (46.4)	8.4 (47.1)	9.8 (49.6)	0.2 (32.4)
Average precipitation mm (inches)	254.2 (10.01)	196.3 (7.73)	254.2 (10.01)	168.5 (6.63)	144.7 (5.70)	108.3 (4.26)	114.5 (4.51)	79.7 (3.14)	143.3 (5.64)	139.2 (5.48)	146.4 (5.76)	204.2 (8.04)	1,953.5 (76.91)
Average precipitation days (≥ 1.0 mm)	15	12	13	11	11	8	9	8	12	12	13	14	138
Average relative humidity (%)	83.4	83.2	84.2	85.6	86.5	87.1	86.4	86.4	85.9	85.3	83.2	82.8	85.0
Mean monthly sunshine hours	143.5	138.9	126.2	113.6	122.2	107.3	114.6	99.0	65.5	86.9	118.8	139.3	1,375.8
Source: Instituto Nacional de Meteorologia (extremes 1931–1988, 1996–1997, 2000–present)

== Media ==
In telecommunications, the city was served by Telecomunicações de São Paulo. In July 1998, this company was acquired by Telefónica, which adopted the Vivo brand in 2012. The company is currently an operator of cell phones, fixed lines, internet (fiber optics/4G) and television (satellite and cable).

== See also ==
- List of municipalities in São Paulo
