= Pedro de Toledo, São Paulo =

Pedro de Toledo
- Municipality
- Flag Coat of arms

- Location in São Paulo state

- Location in Brazil
- Coordinates: 24°16′29″S 47°13′58″W
- Country: Brazil
- Region: Southeast
- State: São Paulo

Area
  - Total: 670 km^{2} (260 sq mi)

Population (2020)
  - Total: 11,421
  - Density: 17/km^{2} (44/sq mi)
- Time zone: UTC−3 (BRT)
- Postal code: 11790-xxx
- Area code: +55-11
- Website: www.pedrodetoledo.sp.gov.br

Pedro de Toledo is a municipality in the state of São Paulo in Brazil. The population is 11,421 (2020 est.) in an area of 670 square kilometres (260 sq mi).

== History ==
The municipality was created by state law in 1948.

Map of the state of São Paulo (1948).

== Geography ==
The elevation of the municipal seat is 45 metres (148 ft). The southern part of the municipality is heavily forested and is part of the Serra do Mar mountain range. In the rest of the area there are farmlands and in the northern part there are hills and mountains. The neighboring municipality is Itanhaém to the east.

The municipality contains part of the 488,865-hectare (1,208,010-acre) Serra do Mar Environmental Protection Area, created in 1984. It contains a small part of the 84,425-hectare (208,620-acre) Juréia-Itatins Ecological Station, a strictly protected area of well-preserved Atlantic Forest created in 1986.

== Media ==
In telecommunications, the city was served by Companhia de Telecomunicações do Estado de São Paulo until 1975, when it began to be served by Telecomunicações de São Paulo. In July 1998, this company was acquired by Telefónica, which adopted the Vivo brand in 2012.

The company is currently an operator of cell phones, fixed lines, internet (fiber optics/4G) and television (satellite and cable).

== See also ==
- List of municipalities in São Paulo
