= Miracatu =

- Municipality
- Flag Coat of arms

- Location in São Paulo state

- Location in Brazil
- Coordinates: 24°16′51″S 47°27′36″W
- Country: Brazil
- Region: Southeast
- State: São Paulo

Area
  - Total: 1,001 km^{2} (386 sq mi)

Population (2020)
  - Total: 19,643
  - Density: 19.62/km^{2} (50.82/sq mi)
- Time zone: UTC−3 (BRT)

Miracatu is a municipality in the state of São Paulo in Brazil. The population is 19,643 (2020 est.) in an area of 1,001 km^{2} (386 sq mi). The elevation is 27 m.

The municipality contains part of the 488,865-hectare (1,208,010-acre) Serra do Mar Environmental Protection Area, created in 1984. It contains a small part of the 84,425-hectare (208,620-acre) Juréia-Itatins Ecological Station, a strictly protected area of well-preserved Atlantic Forest created in 1986.

== History ==
The municipality was created by state law in 1938.

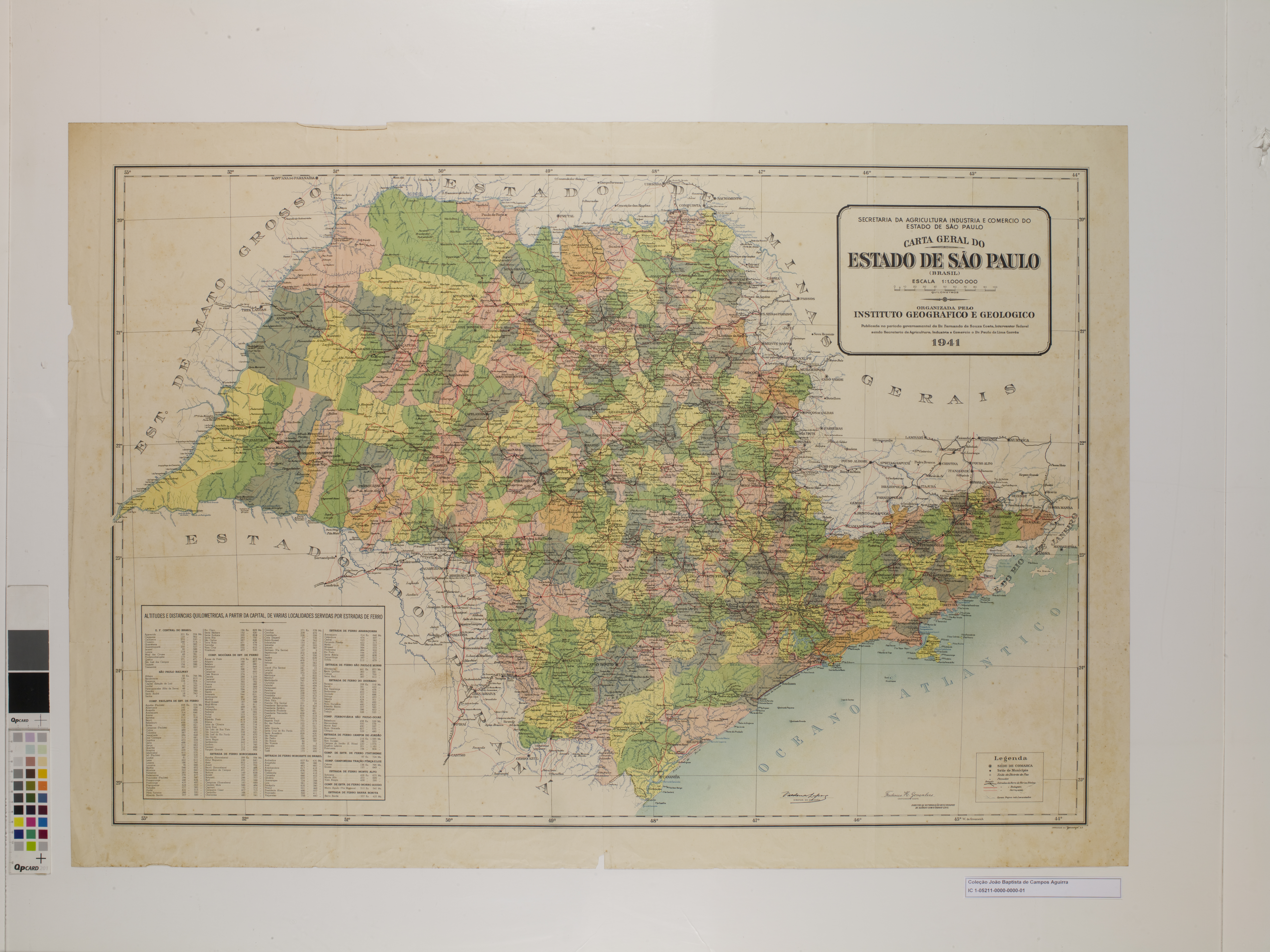
Map of the state of São Paulo (1938).

== Media ==
In telecommunications, the city was served by Companhia de Telecomunicações do Estado de São Paulo until 1975, when it began to be served by Telecomunicações de São Paulo. In July 1998, this company was acquired by Telefónica, which adopted the Vivo brand in 2012.

The company is currently an operator of cell phones, fixed lines, internet (fiber optics/4G) and television (satellite and cable).

== See also ==
- List of municipalities in São Paulo
