= Peruíbe =

- Municipality
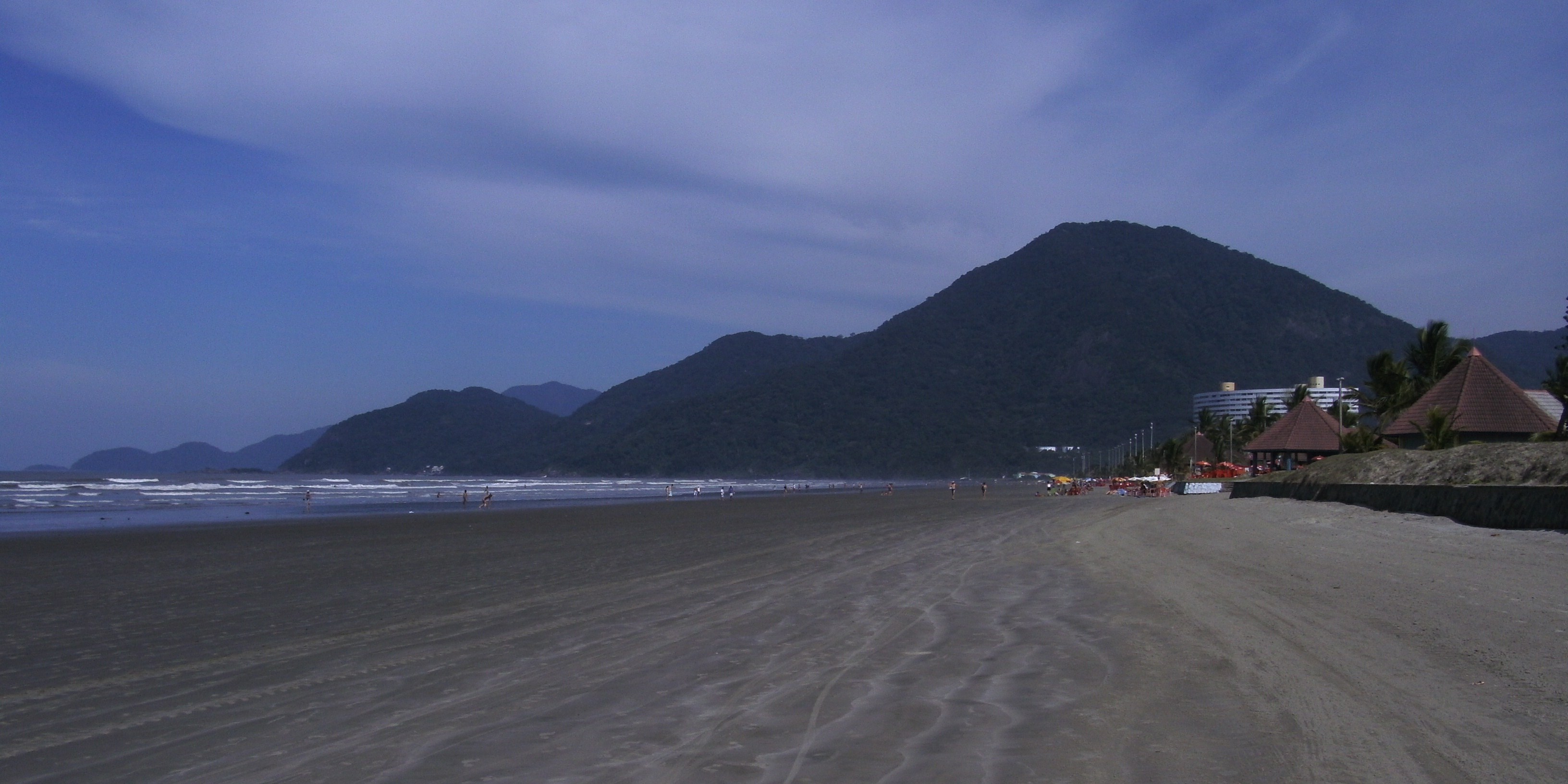

- Flag Coat of arms

- Location in São Paulo state

- Location in Brazil
- Coordinates: 24°19′23″S 47°0′8″W
- Country: Brazil
- Region: Southeast
- State: São Paulo
- Metrop. region: Baixada Santista

Area
  - Total: 324.55 km^{2} (125.31 sq mi)

Population (2020)
  - Total: 69,001
  - Density: 212.61/km^{2} (550.64/sq mi)
- Time zone: UTC−3 (BRT)
- Postal code: 11750-xxx
- Area code: +55-13
- Website: www.peruibe.sp.gov.br

Peruíbe is a municipality in the state of São Paulo in Brazil. It is part of the Metropolitan Region of Baixada Santista. The population is 69,001 (2020 est.) in an area of 324.55 square kilometres (125.31 sq mi). Peruíbe is located to the southwest of the city of São Paulo and west of Santos.

== Geography ==
Peruíbe's urban area is entirely along the Atlantic Ocean fronting its famous beach which is one of the longest in the state. The urban area covers a small part of the municipality, with population growing steadily. Most of the area north of downtown Peruíbe is forested with trees, and is hilly or mountainous as part of the Serra do Mar. An Indian Reservation named Terra Indígena Piaçagüera (Piaçagüera Indigenous Land) which is home to the Guaraní tribe named Nhandhevá covers an area of 27.95 square kilometres (10.79 sq mi) with a perimeter of 38 km.

The municipality contains part of the Tupiniquins Ecological Station. It contains the 359-hectare (890-acre) Ilha do Ameixal Area of Relevant Ecological Interest created in 1985. It also contains a small part of the 84,425-hectare (208,620-acre) Juréia-Itatins Ecological Station, a strictly protected area of well-preserved Atlantic Forest created in 1986. It contains the 5,040-hectare (12,500-acre) Itinguçu State Park, created in 2006. It contains 91% of the 1,487-hectare (3,670-acre) Barra do Una Sustainable Development Reserve, also created in 2006. The municipality contains the 33-hectare (82-acre) Ilhas Queimada Pequena e Queimada Grande Area of Relevant Ecological Interest, created in 1985 to protect two islands off the coast. The Ilhas do Abrigo e Guararitama Wildlife Refuge protects two other islands in the Atlantic Ocean to the east of the town.

== History ==
Peruíbe in the Tupi language (spoken by many Tupi tribes along the Brazilian coast in the 16th century) means river of the shark. Originally as the region of Mongaguá, Peruibe belonged to the Itanhaém territory that stretched from São Vicente to Cananéia, both Portuguese villages founded during the colonial times. As Mongagua (nowadays a city), Peruibe, as a municipality, was created back on 18 February 1959 for administrative convenience. Back in the 16th century, the region of Peruibe (and the one of Itanhaém) would have had a bad reputation since most Tupiniquim Indians living there were put into slavery by the Portuguese, working in sugarcane plantations around São Vicente Island. The Abarebebe as the Indigenous peoples called Father Leonardo Nunes, or "the priest that flies" – since he was seen frequently walking on foot all around the long beach between Itanhaem and Peruibe, was the one who fought against this practice that hurt so many Indian families. He even converted an Indian Chaser who was then killed by the Indians, dying as a martyr. It was there, on the rock of Abarebebe that the Jesuits (also Father Joseph of Anchieta) built the first church of that part of the coast, named Church of Saint John Baptist that served also as a school and refuge against the Indian attacks. The sacred objects were taken to Itanhaem when its first church was finished a little later.

Nowadays Peruibe is a modern city presenting many luxury boroughs and restaurants. The public interest for the city is rising since there is a nature reserve named Parque da Juréia (Jureia Natural Park), featuring pristine beaches (Prainha, Guarau, Parnapoa or Parnapuã, Juquiazinho, Desertinha, Carambore and Barra do Una), which is also a "local caiçara" (native) community of fishermen, sheltering also an immense diversity of flora and fauna. The city is surrounded by the Sea Mountain Range (Serra do Mar) the south end of which, near Barra do Una, is called the Juréia Massif.

== Tourism ==
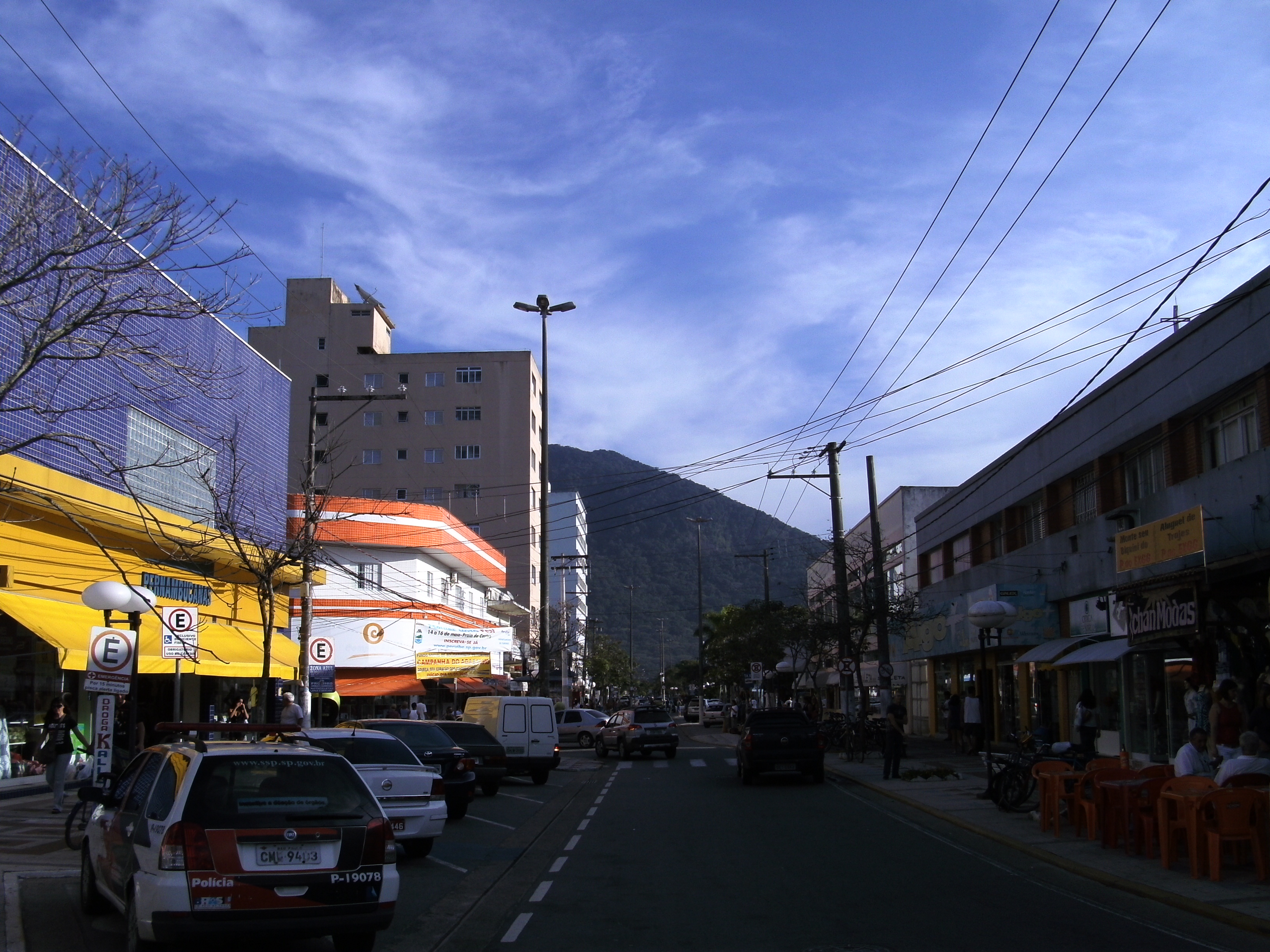
Central area

Peruíbe attracts many tourists throughout the year. In Peruibe there are two areas of tourist interest: urban and ecological. The principal urban attractions are the Tower of TV and Mirante (Torre de TV e Mirante), Ruins of the Abarebebe (Ruínas do Abarebebê), Flórida square (Praça Florida), New Commercial Center-Padre Anchieta Avenue (Centro Comercial Novo-Avenida Padre Anchieta), Old Commercial Center-region of the Estação (Centro Comercial Velho-Região da Estação), Ambrósio Baldin Square (Praça Ambrósio Baldin) and Portinho.

Ecological tourist spots include the Rio Preto Bridge (Ponte do Rio Preto), Costão Beach (Praia do Costão), Mountain range of the Itatins (Serra do Itatins), Quarter of the Guaraú (Bairro do Guaraú), Guaraú River (Rio Guaraú), Guaraú Beach (Praia do Guaraú), Prainha, Bar of Una (Barra do Una), Una River (Rio Una) and Una Beach (Praia do Una).

== Media ==
In telecommunications, the city was served by Companhia de Telecomunicações do Estado de São Paulo until 1975, when it began to be served by Telecomunicações de São Paulo. In July 1998, this company was acquired by Telefónica, which adopted the Vivo brand in 2012.

The company is currently an operator of cell phones, fixed lines, internet (fiber optics/4G) and television (satellite and cable).

== See also ==
- List of municipalities in São Paulo
