= Barra do Una Sustainable Development Reserve =

Sustainable development reserves of Brazil

- Reserva de Desenvolvimento Sustentável Barra do Una
- IUCN category VI (protected area with sustainable use of natural resources)
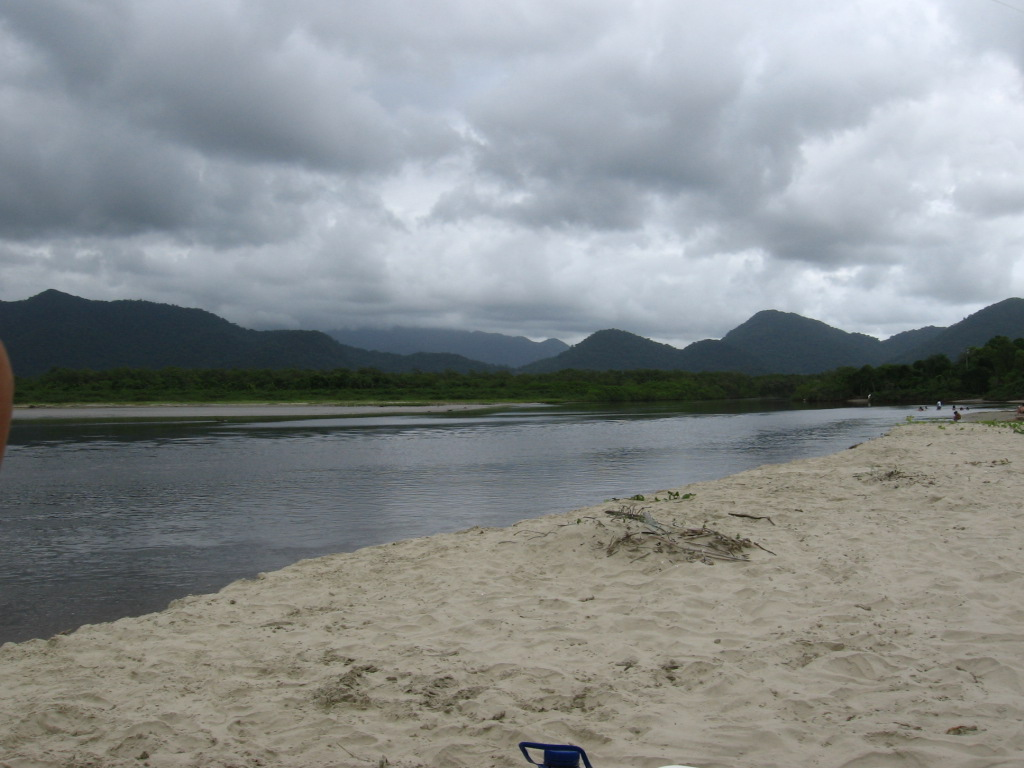

- Location within Brazil
- Nearest city: Peruíbe, São Paulo
- Coordinates: 24.458385°S 47.079303°W
- Designation: Sustainable development reserve
- Created: 12 December 2006

The Barra do Una Sustainable Development Reserve (Portuguese: Reserva de Desenvolvimento Sustentável Barra do Una) is a sustainable development reserve (RDS) in the state of São Paulo, Brazil.

== Location ==
The Barra do Una Sustainable Development Reserve is divided between the municipalities of Peruíbe (91.05%) and Iguape (8.95%) in São Paulo state. It has an area of 1,487 hectares (3,670 acres). The RDS is on the coast at the mouth of the Una do Prelado River. The Juréia-Itatins Ecological Station is to the southwest and the Itinguçu State Park is to the northeast. The Ilha do Ameixal Area of Relevant Ecological Interest covers an island in the river just upstream from its mouth.

== History ==
The RDS was created by state law 12.406 of 12 December 2006 from part of the Juréia-Itatins Ecological Station, including the village of Barra do Una, part of the Una do Prelado River and part of the coastal waters. Law 12.406 was declared unconstitutional on 11 September 2007, and this was confirmed on 25 June 2009. Law 14982 again created the RDS and other conservation units from part of the Juréia-Itatins Ecological Station. The new units and the ecological station were included in the Juréia-Itatins Mosaic.

== Tourism ==
The Associação Amigos de Bairro da Vila Barra do Uma (Association of Friends of the Bairro of Vila Barra do Una) was founded in 2002 and consists of 45 families of traditional inhabitants with about 120 people. It aims to improve the quality of life of the community in a way that is harmonious and integrated with environmental conservation. It sponsors the RDS Community Sustainable Tourism Project, which aims to consolidate and organize tourism in the RDS. The beach is used for activities related to ecotourism such as walking, hiking, mountain biking and jeep tours. The RDS holds the ruins of a 16th-century Jesuit church. The villagers preserve many of the caiçaras festivals, traditions and costumes. The RDS has hostels and camping areas, bars, restaurants, grocery stores and a small marina.

== Sources ==
- Luciene Diocenio Pinto, "Turismo sustentável de base comunitária na RDS da Barra do Una", IVT (in Portuguese)
- RDS da Barra do Una (mapa) (in Portuguese), Wikiaves
- RDS Barra do Una (in Portuguese), ISA: Instituto Socioambiental
