= Jureia Massif =

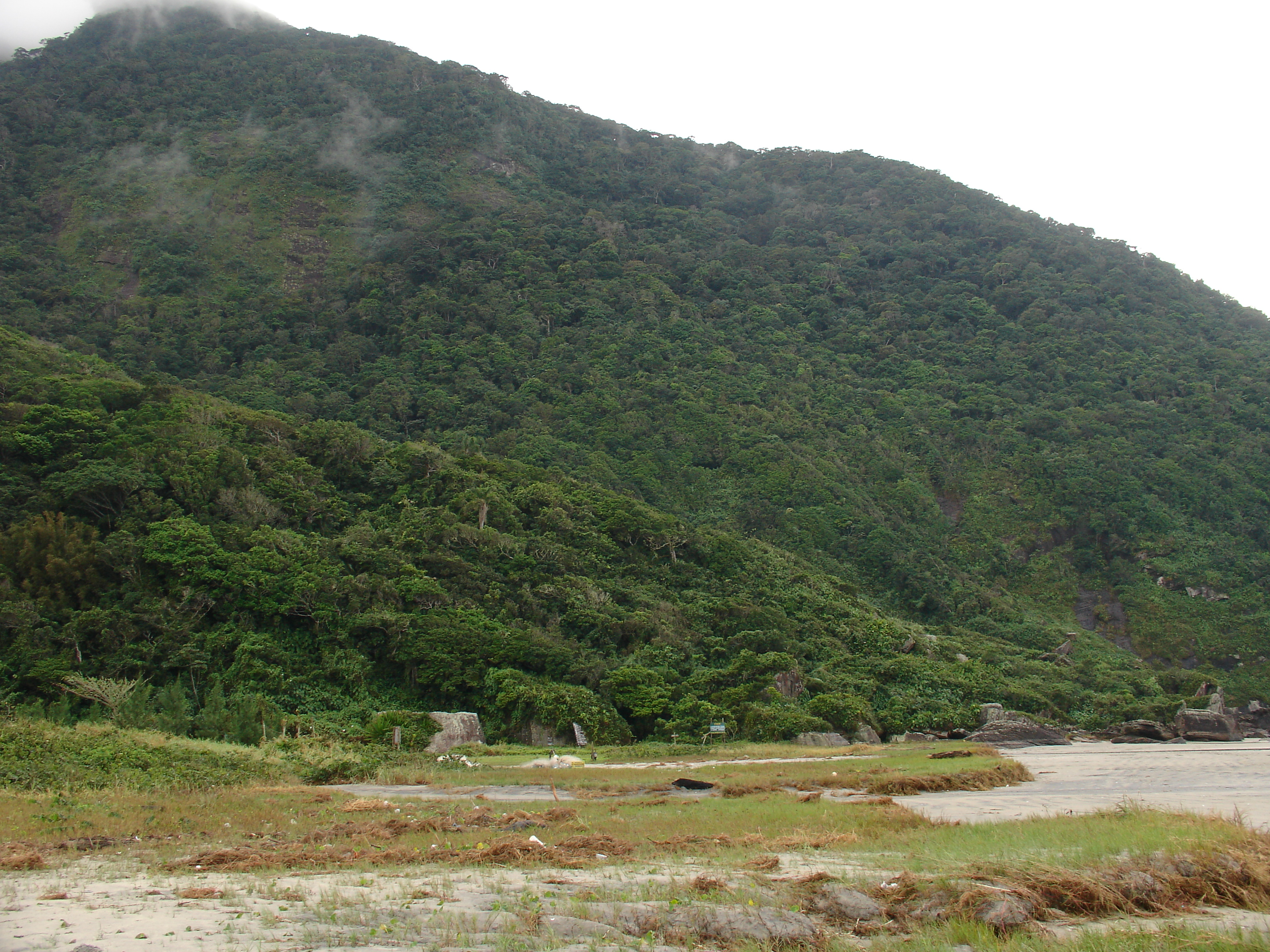
- Jureia massif from the Prelado State Park

Highest point
- Elevation: 800 m (2,600 ft)
- Coordinates: 24°31′39″S 47°15′19″W

Naming
- Native name: Serra da Jureia (Portuguese)

Geography
- Location within Brazil

Geology
- Rock age: Precambrian

The Jureia Massif (Portuguese: Serra da Jureia) is an isolated group of mountains on the coast of the state of São Paulo, Brazil. The mountains hold a well-preserved remnant of Atlantic Forest, and are contained in the fully protected Jureia-Itatins Ecological Station.

== Location ==
The name "Jureia" means prominent point in the Tupi-Guaraní language. The Serra da Jureia is a Precambrian horst on the coast of the municipality of Iguape in the south of São Paulo state. The massif covers 58 square kilometres (22 sq mi) and rises to 400 to 800 metres (1,300 to 2,600 ft). The eastern side falls steeply to the ocean. It is an inselberg connected to the mainland by a sandy alluvial plain that was formed 5100 years ago during the post-glacial Cananéia Transgression, when the sea was about 3 metres (9.8 ft) higher than at present. The Paranapu massif, part of the Serra dos Itatins, rises from the plain to the north.

== Hydrology ==
The streams formed in the Serra da Jureia are clear, with a pH of 5–6.5, and are low in nutrients. A few originate in springs in the campo, but most are rain-fed and intermittent. Quiet streams may become torrential during times of heavy rainfall. The Una do Prelado River, a blackwater river, meanders in a northeast direction through the plain between the Serra da Jureia and the Serra dos Itatins. The Serra da Jureia is divided by the valley of the Rio Verde, which flows south to the ocean.

== Environment ==
Average annual temperatures range from 19.6 to 21.4 °C (67.3 to 70.5 °F). Average annual rainfall is 2,277.8 millimetres (89.68 in). The climate is tropical humid with no dry season. At least 30 millimetres (1.2 in) of rain falls in the driest month. The Serra da Jureia and its surroundings hold one of the best preserved remnants of Atlantic Forest on the coast of São Paulo. Above 300 metres (980 ft) the mountains are covered by campo vegetation - fields of grass, herbs and shrubs. The slopes and base of the mountain are clothed in evergreen tropical forest. There is a wide variety of species of flora, some rare.

== Conservation ==
The Department of the Environment planned to develop a "green" housing project on the banks of the Rio Verde. The project was cancelled in the 1980s when the Empresa Nuclebrás Brasileira decided to build the Iguape 4 and Iguape 5 power plants in a 23,600 hectares (58,000 acres) area that included the entire Serra da Jureia. By law, the area surrounding the nuclear power plant would have to be made an ecological station. The power plant project was abandoned but the Jureia-Itatins Ecological Station was created on 20 January 1986, covering the Jureia Massif and the entire watershed of the Una do Prelado River.

== Sources ==
- ESEC Juréia-Itatins (in Portuguese), ISA: Instituto Socioambiental
- Estação Ecológica da Juréia-Itatins (in Portuguese), SAP: Sistema Ambiental Paulista, archived from the original on 2016-08-17
- Fabio Zanchi (2012), "Estação Ecológica Juréia-Itatins", Eco Juréia (in Portuguese)
- Mamede, Maria Candida H.; Cordeiro, Inês; Rossi, Lucia (2014), Juréia-Itatins Ecological Station (in Portuguese), Secretaria de Estado do Meio Ambiente, Instituto de Botânica, archived from the original on 2016-06-02
