= List of highways numbered 277 =

The following highways are numbered 277:

== Brazil ==
- BR-277

== Canada ==
- Nova Scotia Route 277
- Quebec Route 277

== Japan ==
- Japan National Route 277

== United States ==
- Interstate 277
- U.S. Route 277
- Alabama State Route 277
- Arizona State Route 277
- Florida State Road 277
- Georgia State Route 277 (former)
- K-277 (Kansas highway)
- Kentucky Route 277
- Maryland Route 277
- Minnesota State Highway 277
- Montana Secondary Highway 277
- New York State Route 277
- Pennsylvania Route 277 (former)
- South Carolina Highway 277
- Tennessee State Route 277
- Texas State Highway 277 (former)
  - Texas State Highway Spur 277
  - Farm to Market Road 277 (Texas)
- Utah State Route 277 (former)
- Virginia State Route 277

Preceded by 276	Lists of highways 277	Succeeded by 278
