= Antônio Francisco Corrêa de Bittencourt =

Brazilian merchant and politician

Antonio Francisco Correa de Bittencourt (June 14, 1834 – September 8, 1918), was a Brazilian merchant and politician.

== Biography ==
Corrêa Bittencourt was born in the seaside town of Antonina, in the year 1834, to Francisco Corrêa and d. Euphrasia of Jesus. As a child he studied in his hometown. During his adolescence, moved to Curitiba, where he became a profitable merchant.

On November 11, 1866, he married the daughter of Captain Manuel Rodrigues Biscay and Maria Francisca da Cruz Biscay. Corrêa was named chamberlain Curitiba and elected Congressman provincial biennium for 1888–1889. When Corrêa became advanced in age, he began studying for medicine and performed services principally for the needy population in Curitiba.

Antônio Francisco Corrêa de Bittencourt died in Curitiba on September 8, 1918.
