= Pau Oco State Park =

State park in Paraná, Brazil

- Parque Estadual do Pau-Oco
- IUCN category II (national park)
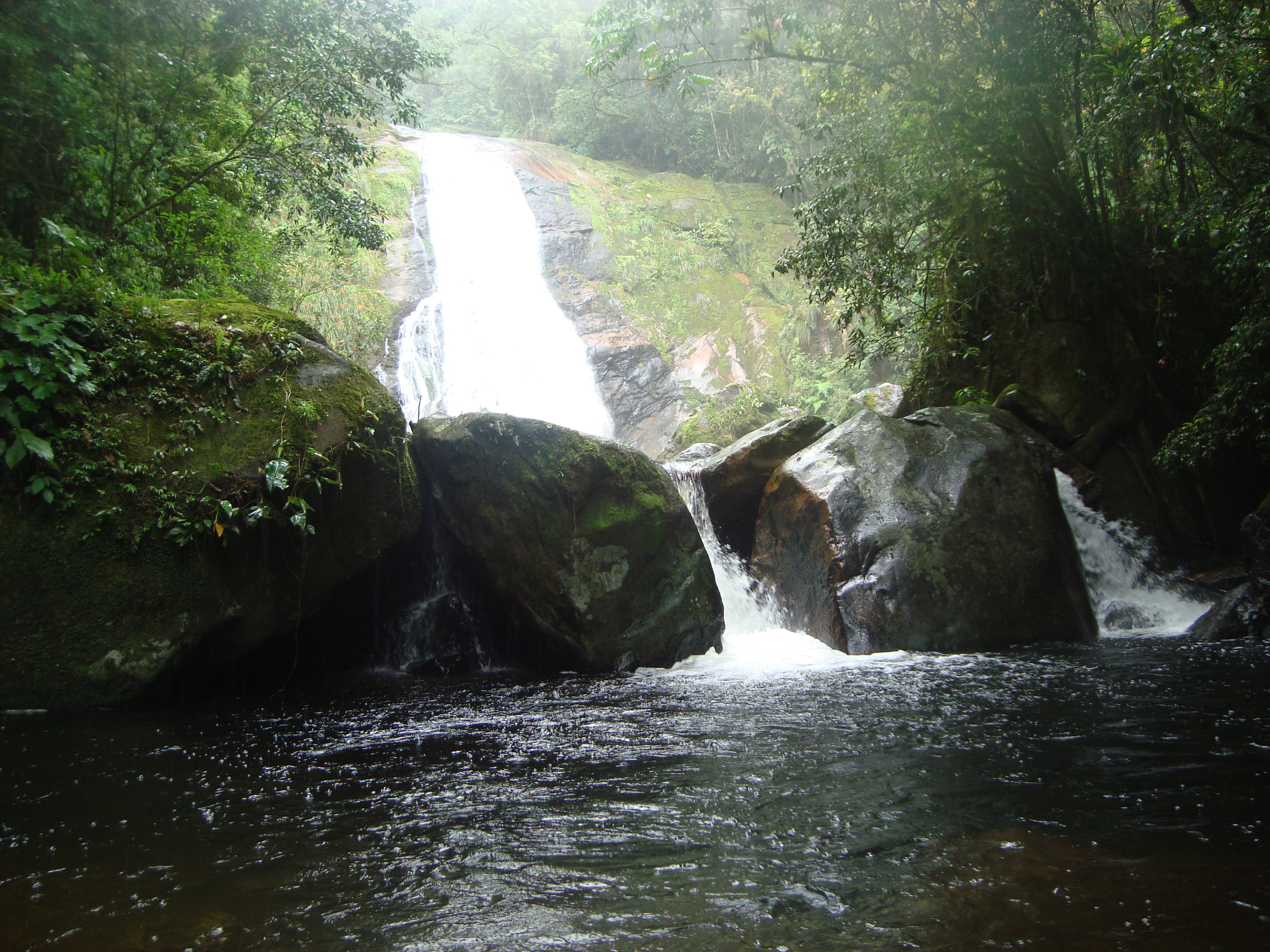
- Salto Da Fortuna

- Location within Brazil
- Nearest city: Morretes, Paraná
- Coordinates: 25.563°S 48.9068°W
- Area: 905.58 hectares (2,237.7 acres)
- Designation: State park
- Created: 21 November 1994
- Administrator: Instituto Ambiental do Paraná

The Pau Oco State Park (Portuguese: Parque Estadual do Pau-Oco) is a state park in the state of Paraná, Brazil. It protects an area of Atlantic Forest. The main attraction is the Salto da Fortuna, a waterfall.

== Location ==
The Pau Oco State Park has an area of 905.58 hectares (2,237.7 acres) in the municipality of Morretes, Paraná. It is part of the Lagamar Mosaic. The park contains the Salto da Fortuna, a waterfall that may be reached by a trail taking about four hours round trip. The fall is 50 metres (160 ft) high and has a large natural pool at its base where visitors may bathe. A local guide is required. The trail is of medium difficulty, crosses rivers, and includes sections and ruins of the old Arraial Colonial Route, now replaced by BR-277. The Arraial Colonial Way was opened between 1586 and 1590. There is an old chapel used by the miners of that time to request protection on their expeditions into the Serra do Mar.

== History ==
The Pau Oco State Park was created by state governor decree 4266 of 21 November 1994. The land was owned by the Environmental Institute of Paraná (IAP), who was responsible for promoting preservation of the water, flora and fauna. Two years were allowed for preparation of the management plan, which was to be integrated with the Marumbi Special Area of Tourist Interest. The park is classed IUCN protected area category II (national park), with the basic objective of preserving the ecosystems.

== Sources ==
- "Morretes: Cachoeira Salto da Fortuna", Nosso Litoral do Paraná (in Portuguese), archived from the original on 2016-11-20
- Parque Estadual do Pau-Oco (in Portuguese), Via Rural, archived from the original on February 13, 2009
- Pereira, Mário; Sorotiuk, Vitório (21 November 1994), Decreto 4266 - 21 de Novembro de 1994 (in Portuguese), State of Paraná
- Unidade de Conservação: Parque Estadual do Pau-Oco (in Portuguese), MMA: Ministério do Meio Ambiente
- Unidades de Conservação - Mosaico do Litoral Sul de São Paulo e do Litoral do Paraná - LAGAMAR (in Portuguese), ICMBio, archived from the original on 2019-05-27
