= List of highways numbered 280 =

Route 280, or Highway 280, may refer to:

== Australia ==
- McIvor Highway

== Canada ==
- Manitoba Provincial Road 280
- New Brunswick Route 280

== Finland ==
- Finnish regional road 280

== Japan ==
- Japan National Route 280

== United States ==
- Interstate 280 (multiple highways)
- U.S. Route 280
- Arizona State Route 280 (former)
- Arkansas Highway 280
  - Arkansas Highway 280 Spur
- Florida State Road 280 (former)
- Georgia State Route 280
- Kentucky Route 280
- Maryland Route 280 (former)
- Minnesota State Highway 280
- Montana Secondary Highway 280
- New York State Route 280
- North Carolina Highway 280
- Pennsylvania Route 280 (former)
- South Carolina Highway 280
- Tennessee State Route 280
- Texas State Highway 280 (former proposed)
  - Texas State Highway Spur 280
  - Farm to Market Road 280 (Texas)
- Utah State Route 280

Preceded by 279	Lists of highways 280	Succeeded by 281
