= Graciosa State Park =

State park in Paraná, Brazil

- Parque Estadual da Graciosa
- IUCN category II (national park)
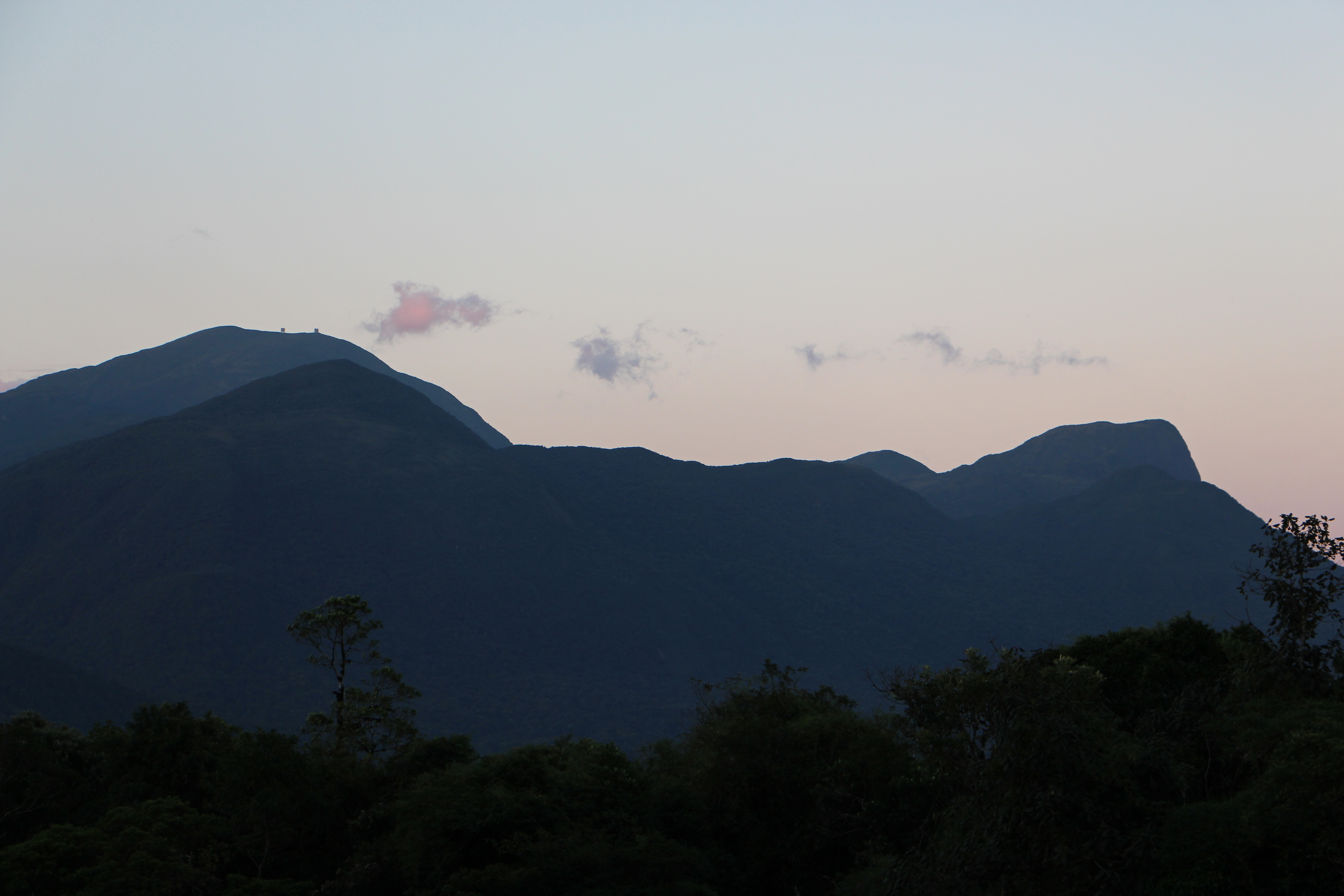
- The park in late afternoon

- Location within Brazil
- Nearest city: Morretes, Paraná
- Coordinates: 25.385°S 48.925°W
- Area: 1,190 hectares (2,900 acres)
- Designation: State park
- Created: 24 September 1990

The Graciosa State Park (Portuguese: Parque Estadual da Graciosa) is a state park in the state of Paraná, Brazil. It protects an area of dense rainforest in the Atlantic Forest biome.

== Location ==
The Graciosa State Park is in the municipality of Morretes, Paraná. It has an area of 1,190 hectares (2,900 acres). It is situated between the Serra da Graciosa and the Serra do Mar. It is in the Atlantic Forest biome. The park contains typical dense rainforest flora, and is home to a wide variety of species of birds, mammals, snakes, frogs and insects. The park is located between Anhangava, Marumbi and Pico Paraná. It receives few visitors due to the difficulty of finding a way through the dense forest, lack of mountain meadows and absence of important summits. It adjoins the 4,334-hectare (10,710-acre) Pico Paraná State Park to the north. It is part of the Lagamar Mosaic.

== History ==
The Graciosa State Park was created by decree 7.302 of 24 September 1990 by the governor of the state of Paraná. The purpose was to protect the biodiversity and water sources of the region. The park was created from the Farinha Seca property. The state's Institute of Lands, Cartography and Forests (ITCF) was responsible for administration and for creating a management plan within two years, which would integrate the park into Marumbi's Special Area of Tourist Interest. The park is classed as IUCN protected area category II (national park).

== Sources ==
- Dias, Álvaro; Dias, Osmar Fernandes; Pereira de Souza, Paulo Roberto (24 September 1990), Decreto 7302 - 24 de Setembro de 1990 (in Portuguese)
- Parque Estadual da Graciosa (in Portuguese), Via Rural, archived from the original on November 16, 2016
- PES da Graciosa (in Portuguese), ISA: Instituto Socioambiental
- Ponto Mais Alto do Sul do País Fica no Parque Estadual Pico Paraná (in Portuguese), Paraná Turismo, 22 September 2015, archived from the original on 2016-11-20
- Unidade de Conservação: Parque Estadual da Graciosa (in Portuguese), MMA: Ministério do Meio Ambiente
- Unidades de Conservação - Mosaico do Litoral Sul de São Paulo e do Litoral do Paraná - LAGAMAR (in Portuguese), ICMBio, archived from the original on 2019-05-27
