= Roberto Ribas Lange State Park =

State park in Paraná, Brazil

- Parque Estadual Roberto Ribas Lange
- IUCN category II (national park)
- Location within Brazil
- Nearest city: Antonina, Paraná
- Coordinates: 25°19′47″S 48°52′03″W
- Area: 2,698.69 hectares (6,668.6 acres)
- Designation: State park
- Created: 21 November 1994
- Administrator: Instituto Ambiental do Paraná

The Roberto Ribas Lange State Park (Portuguese: Parque Estadual Roberto Ribas Lange) is a State park in the state of Paraná, Brazil. It protects an area holding remnants of Atlantic Forest.

== Location ==
The Roberto Ribas Lange State Park is divided between the municipalities of Antonina (28.77%), Campina Grande do Sul (9.75%) and Morretes (61.48%) in Paraná. It has an area of 2,698.69 hectares (6,668.6 acres). As of 2016 the park was not open to visitors. It adjoins the 4,334 hectares (10,710 acres) Pico Paraná State Park to the south. The conservation unit is part of the Lagamar Mosaic.

== History ==
The Agudo da Cotia State Park was created by decree 7.301 of 24 September 1990. The Roberto Ribas Lange State Park was created by state decree 4.267 of 21 November 1994, with an area of 2,698.69 hectares (6,668.6 acres). Of this, 1,009 hectares (2,490 acres) belonged to the Agudos da Cotia State Park, which was revoked. The objective is to protect remnants of Atlantic Forest, and their biodiversity. Administrative responsibility was given to the Environmental Institute of Paraná (IAP).

== Sources ==
- "Antonina: Parque Estadual Roberto Ribas Lange", Nosso Litoral do Paraná (in Portuguese)
- Pereira, Mário; Sorotiuk, Vitório (21 November 1994), Decreto nº 4.267 de 21 de Novembro de 1994 (PDF) (in Portuguese)
- PES Roberto Ribas Lange (in Portuguese), ISA: Instituto Socioambiental
- Ponto Mais Alto do Sul do País Fica no Parque Estadual Pico Paraná (in Portuguese), Paraná Turismo, 22 September 2015, archived from the original on 2016-11-20
- Unidades de Conservação - Mosaico do Litoral Sul de São Paulo e do Litoral do Paraná - LAGAMAR (in Portuguese), ICMBio, archived from the original on 2019-05-27
