= List of highways numbered 278 =

The following highways are numbered 278:

== Canada ==
- Manitoba Provincial Road 278

== Japan ==
- Japan National Route 278

== United States ==
- Interstate 278
- U.S. Route 278
- Arkansas Highway 278 (former)
- Florida State Road 278 (former)
- Georgia State Route 278
- K-278 (Kansas highway)
- Kentucky Route 278
- Maryland Route 278 (former)
- Minnesota State Highway 278 (former)
- Montana Secondary Highway 278
- New Mexico State Road 278
- Nevada State Route 278
- New York State Route 278
- Ohio State Route 278
- Pennsylvania Route 278 (former)
- Tennessee State Route 278
- Texas State Highway 278 (former)
  - Texas State Highway Spur 278
  - Farm to Market Road 278 (Texas)
- Utah State Route 278 (former)
- Virginia State Route 278
- Washington State Route 278

Preceded by 277	Lists of highways 278	Succeeded by 279
