= Morretes =

- Municipality
- Municipality of Morretes
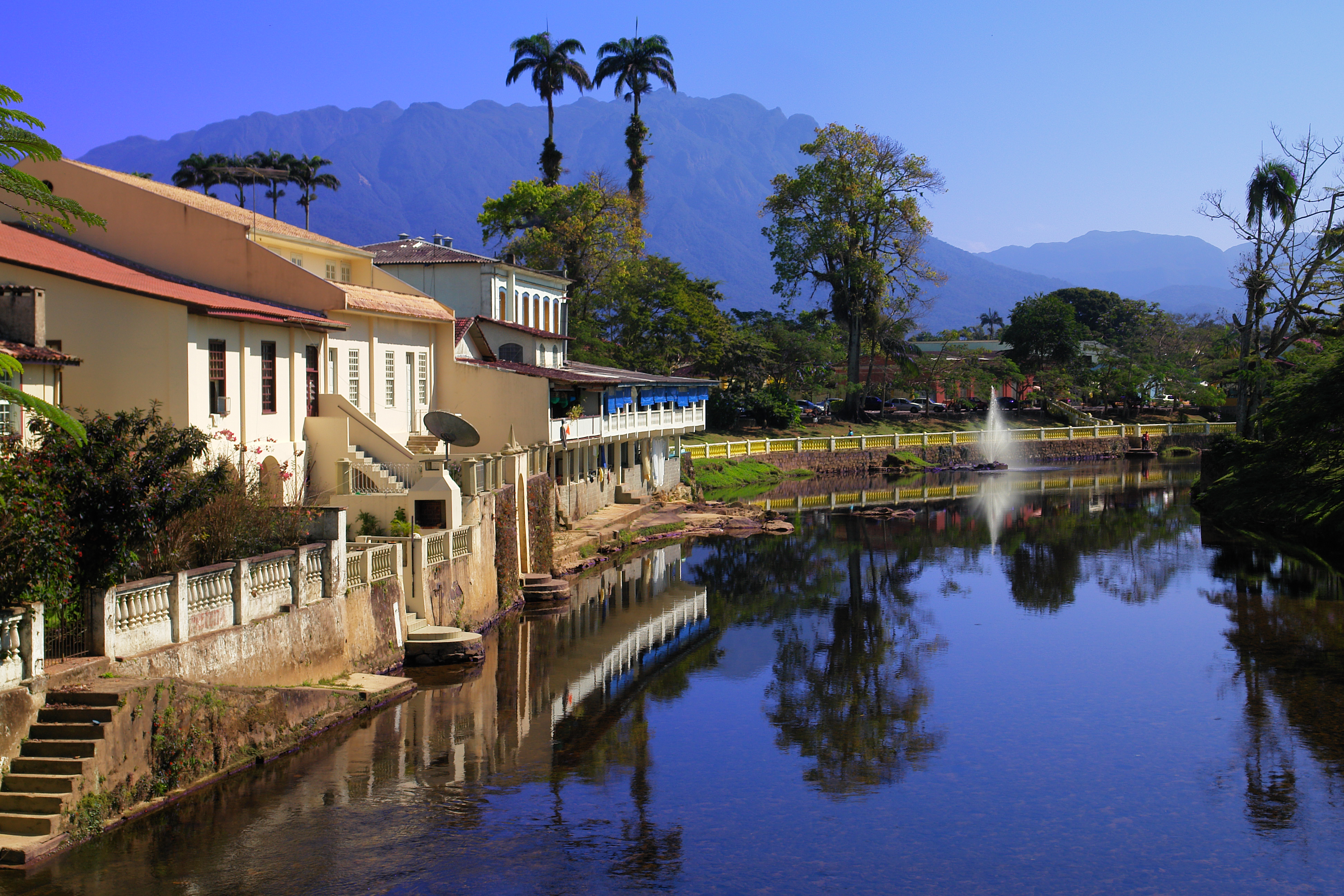
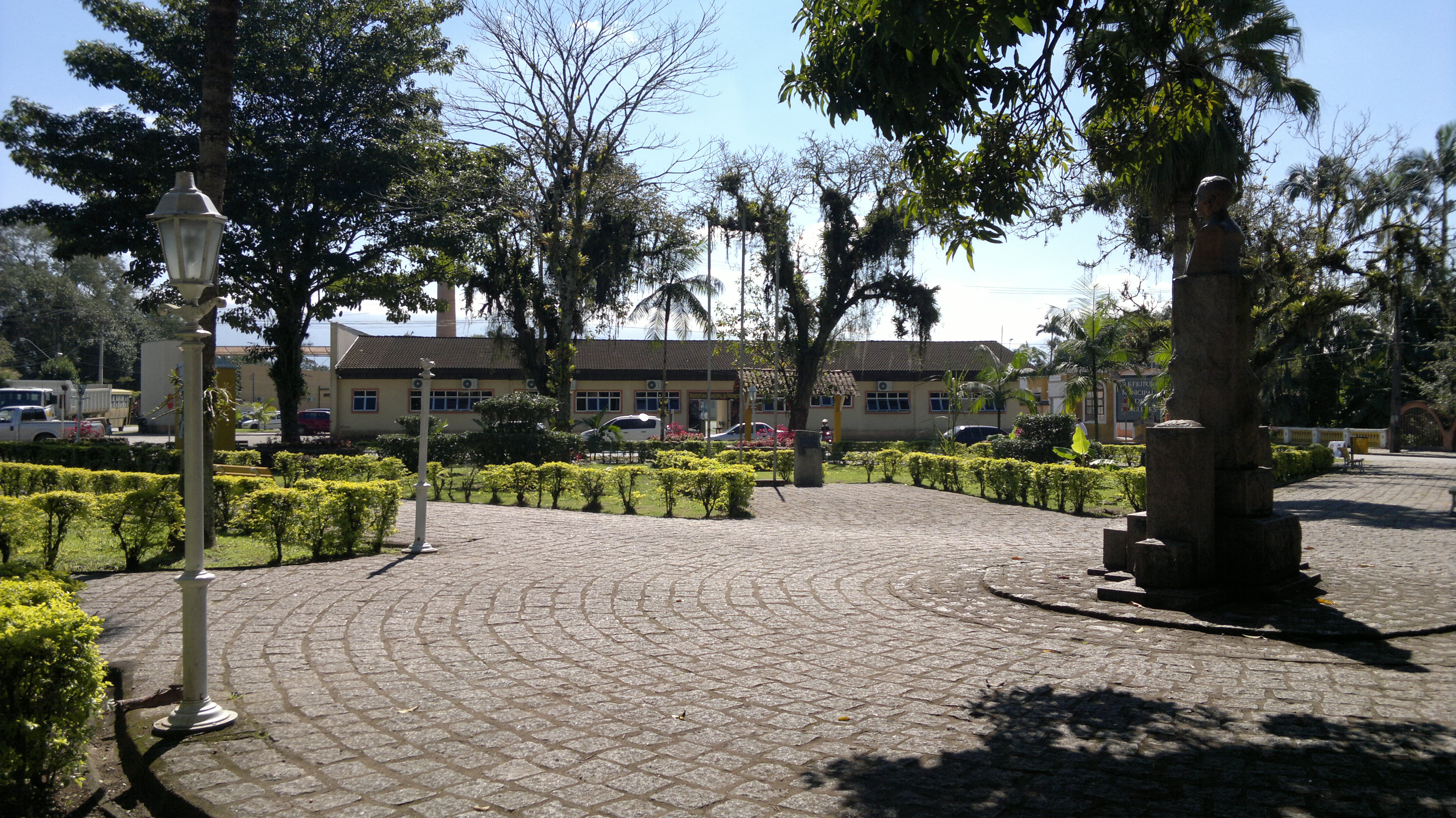
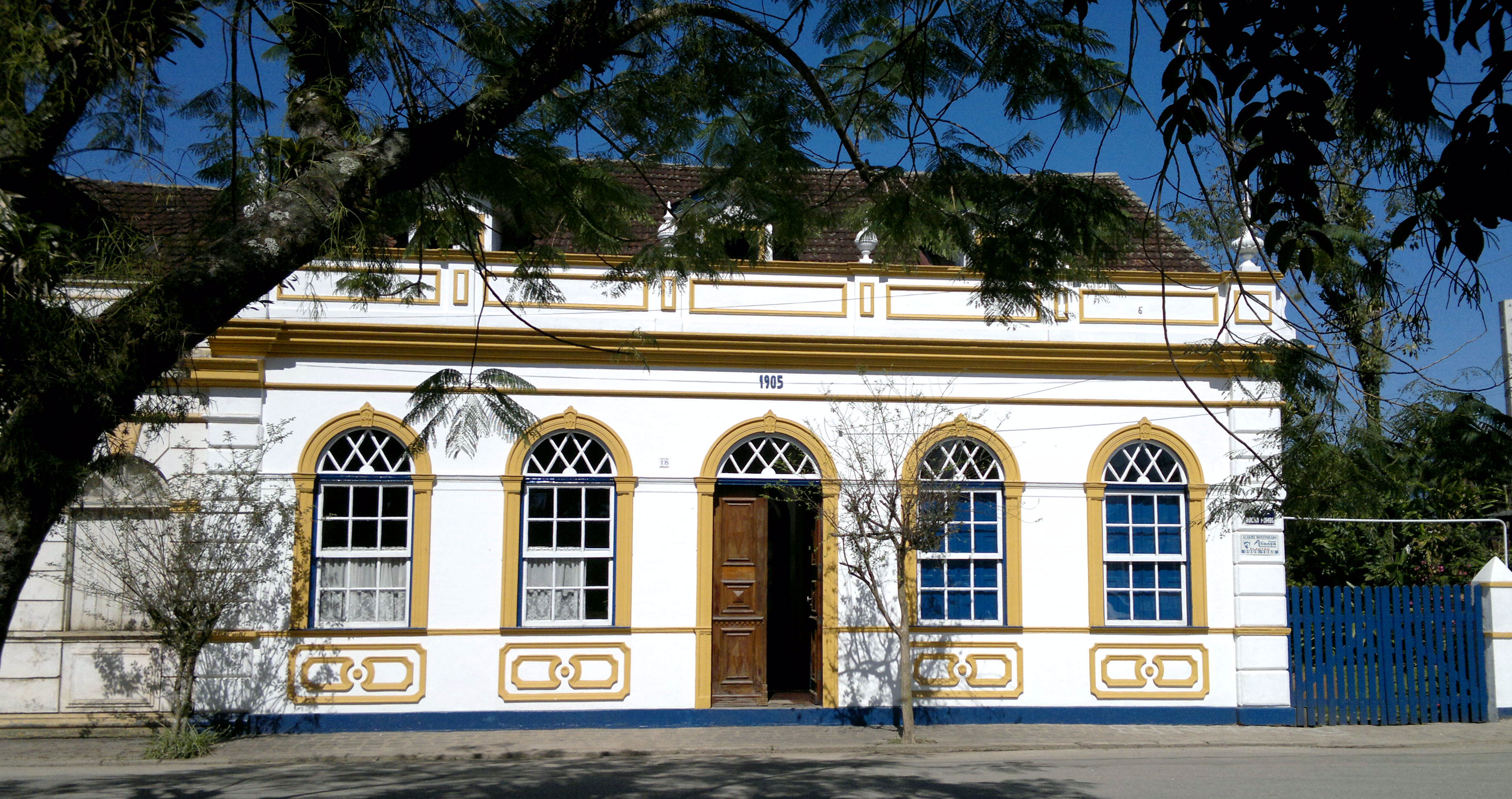
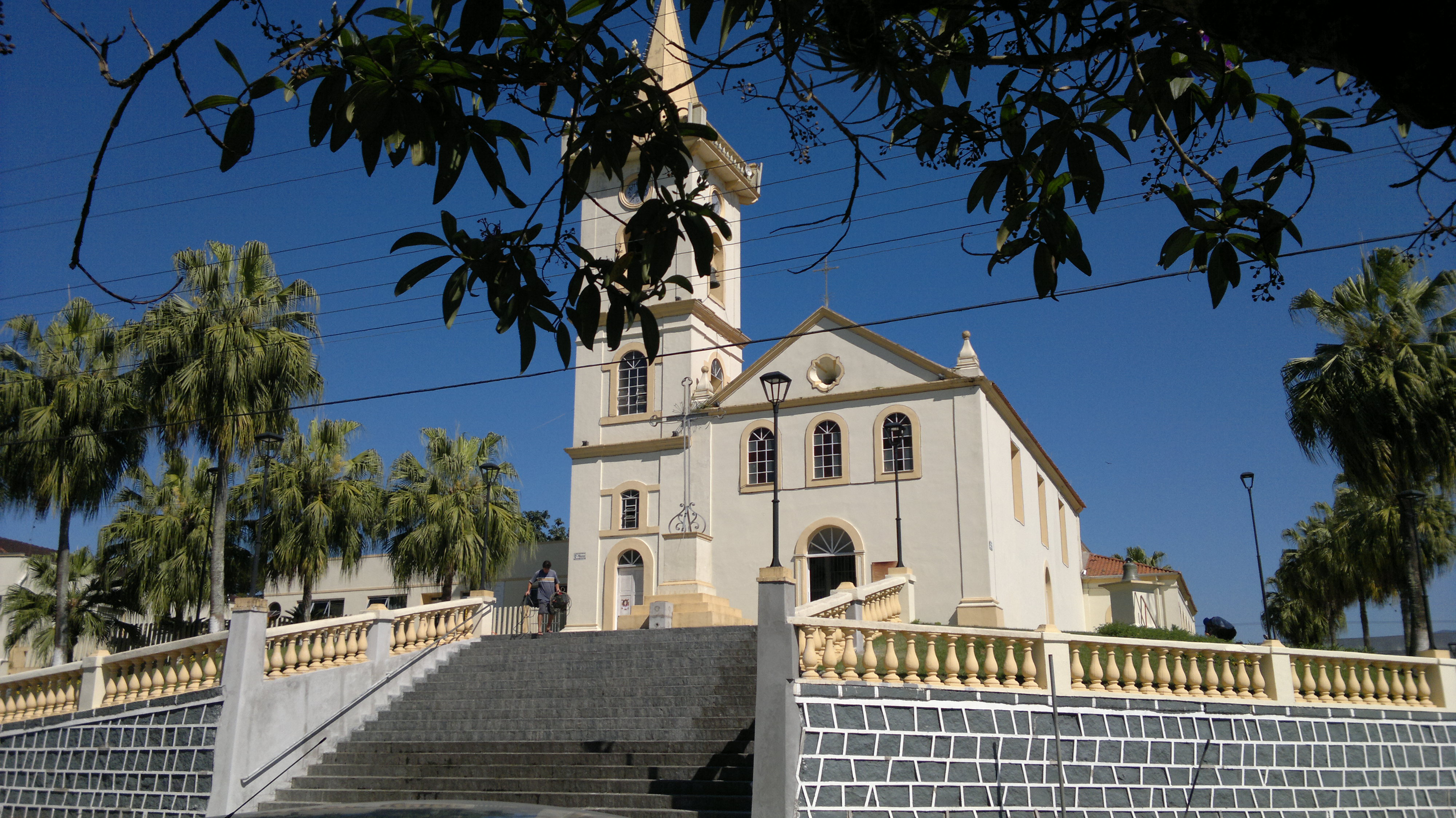
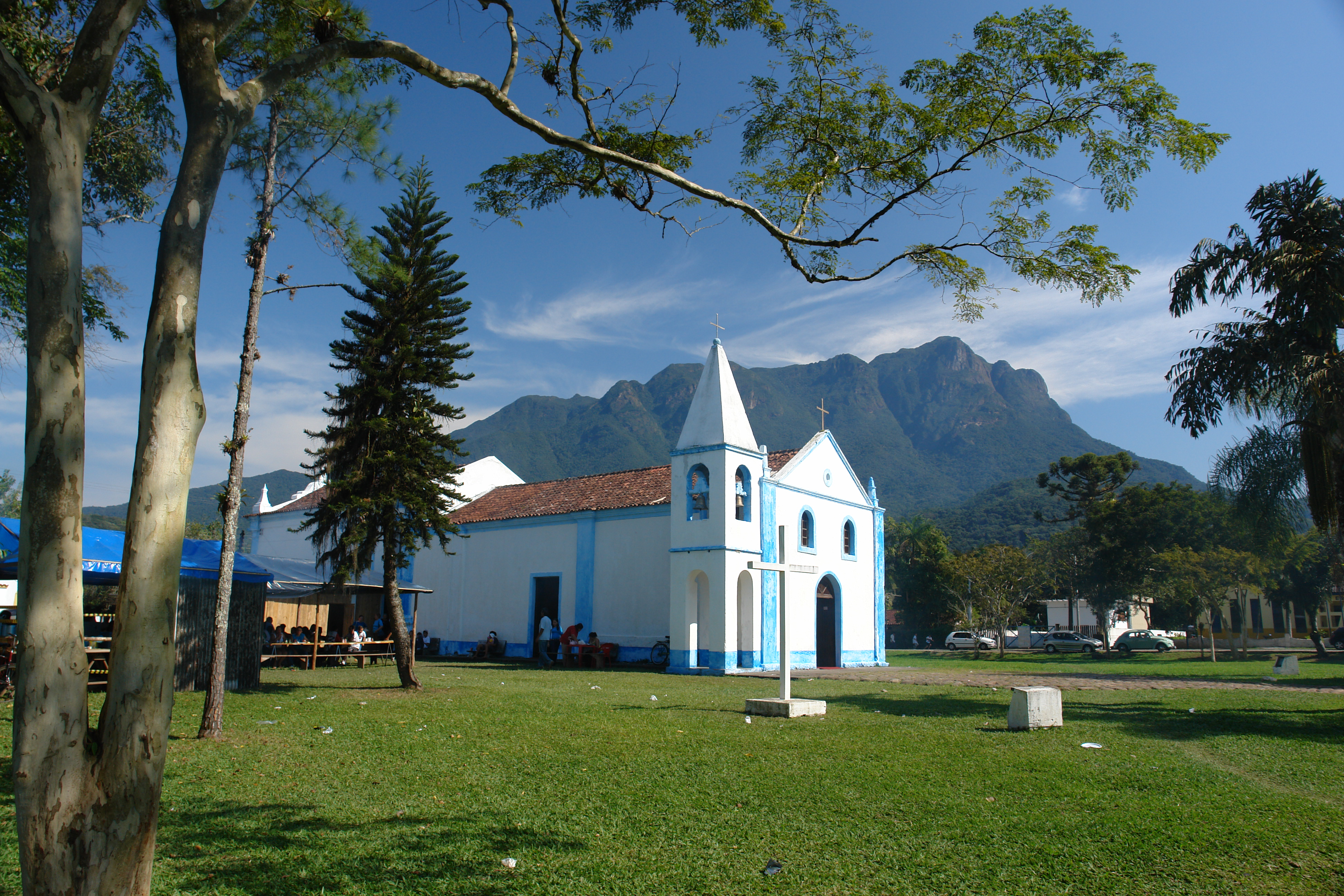
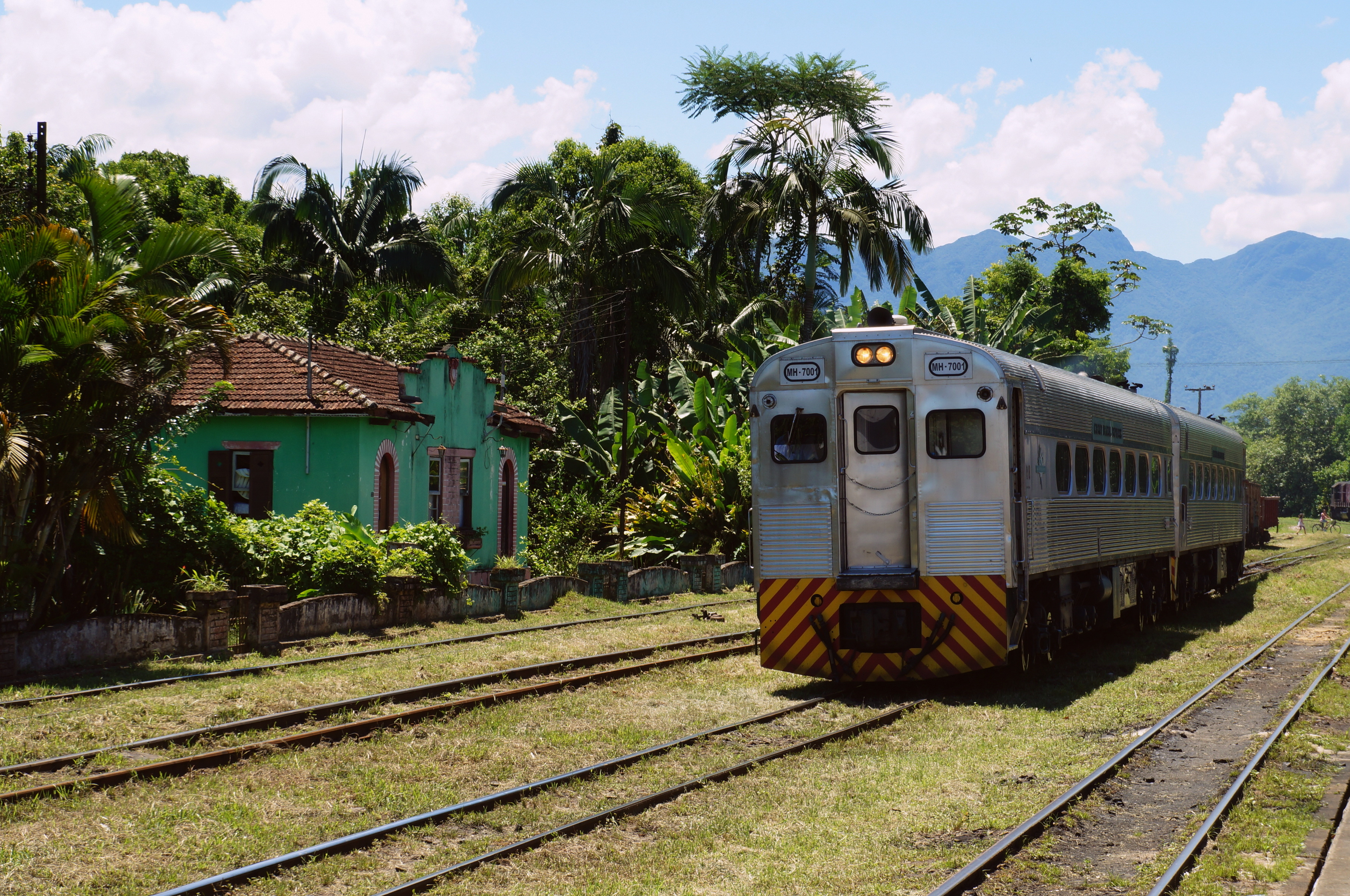
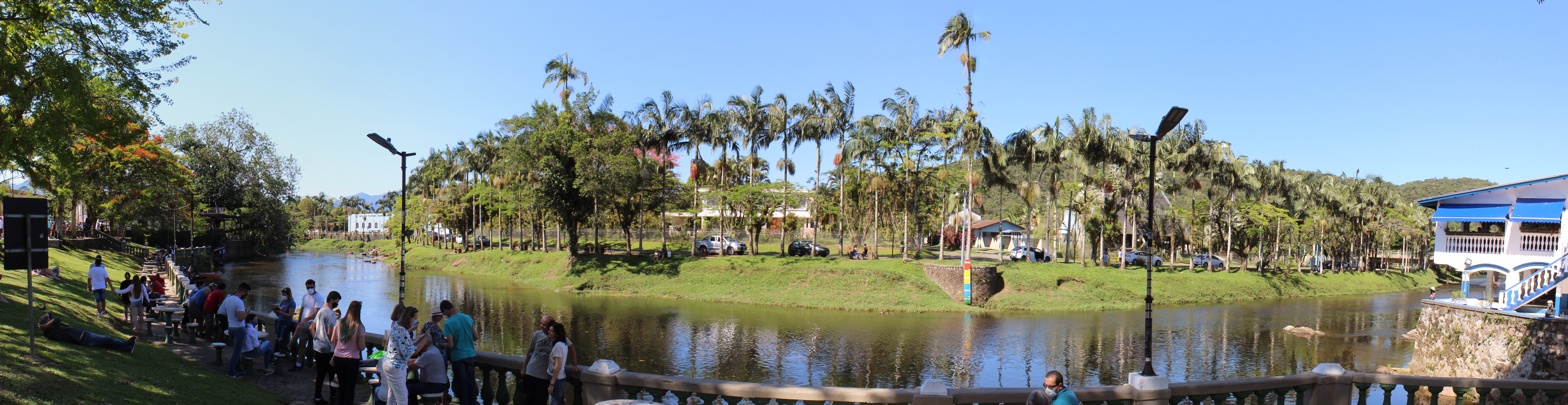

- Flag Coat of arms
- Motto: A Cidade da Gente (Our City; The People's City)
- Location of Morretes in Paraná

- Location of Morretes in Brazil
- Coordinates: 25°28′37″S 48°50′02″W
- Country: Brazil
- Region: South
- State: Paraná
- Mesoregion: Curitiba (metropolitan)
- Microregion: Paranaguá
- Founded: October 31, 1733
- Founder: Rafael Pires Pardinho

Government
  - Mayor: Junior Brindarolli (2021 – 2024) (PSD)

Area
  - Total: 648.580 km^{2} (250.418 sq mi)

Population (2020)
  - Total: 16,446
  - Density: 25.357/km^{2} (65.674/sq mi)
- Time zone: UTC−3 (BRT)
- HDI (2010): 0.686 – medium
- Website: Official website

Morretes is a small historic city of the Brazilian state of Paraná. It has a population of around 16,000 people. It is famous for its restaurants, especially a traditional dish called barreado. It is also the home of many historical monuments.

== History ==
=== Etymology ===
The name "Morretes" is a geographical reference to the morros (Portuguese for "hills") that surround the city.

== Geography ==
Morretes can be reached by road or by taking the historical Serra Verde Express train from Curitiba, or the touristic Paranagua-Curitiba Railway.

== Main sights ==
=== Overview ===
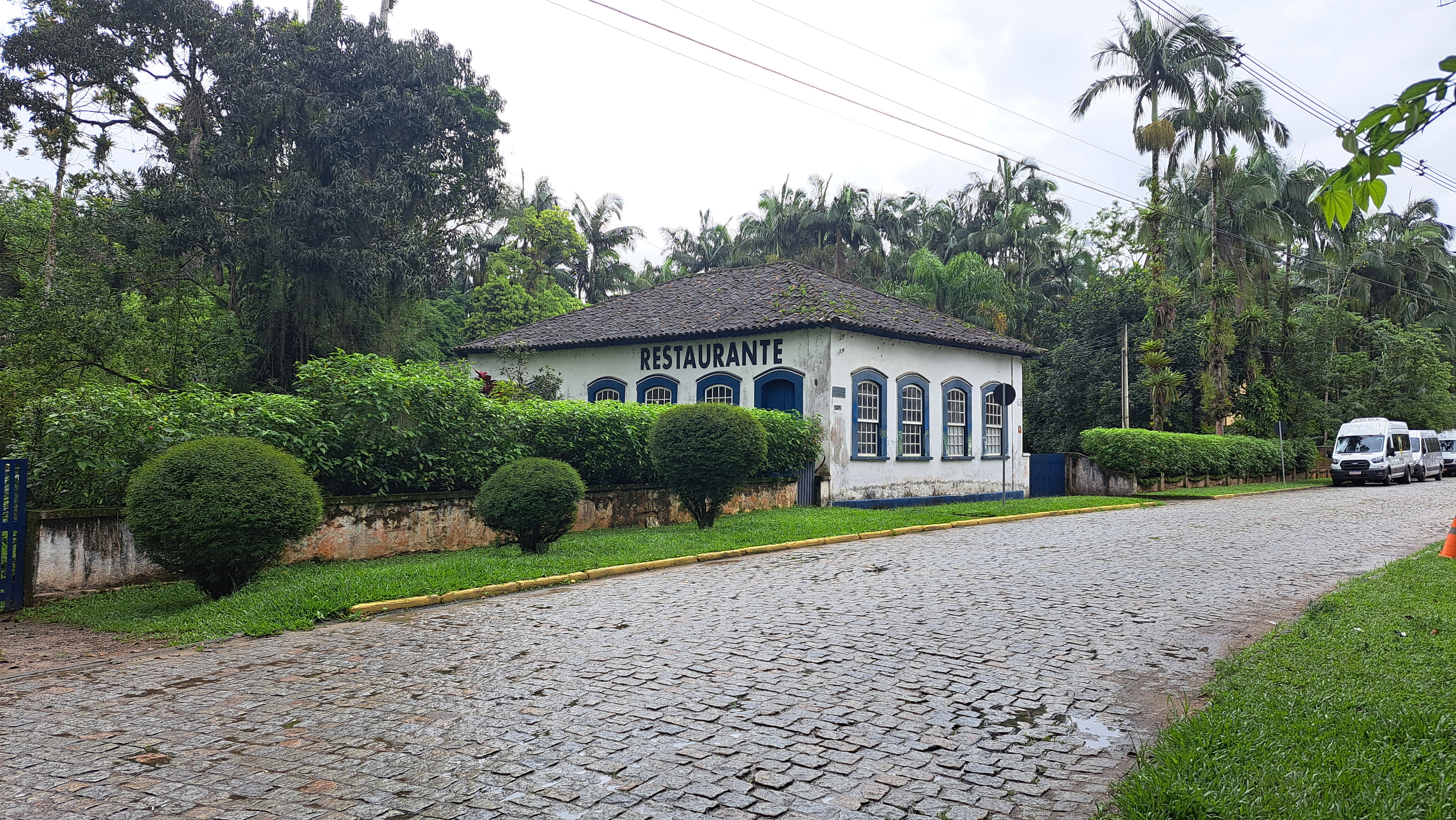
Old street in Morretes, PR

Saint Benedict's Church (Igreja de São Benedito): There are a lot of attractions in Morretes. One of them is the Saint Benedict's Church. In 1760, the Brotherhood of Saint Benedict was founded in Morretes. Between 1865 and 1895 the chapel and the cemetery were built, not without some difficulty, as the region was going through a period of economic decadence. Its architecture is composed of the simplest edified scheme of the religious tradition: nave, bell-tower and main chapel. Inside there are many images from different times, including one of the patron saint, the "glorious St. Benedict".

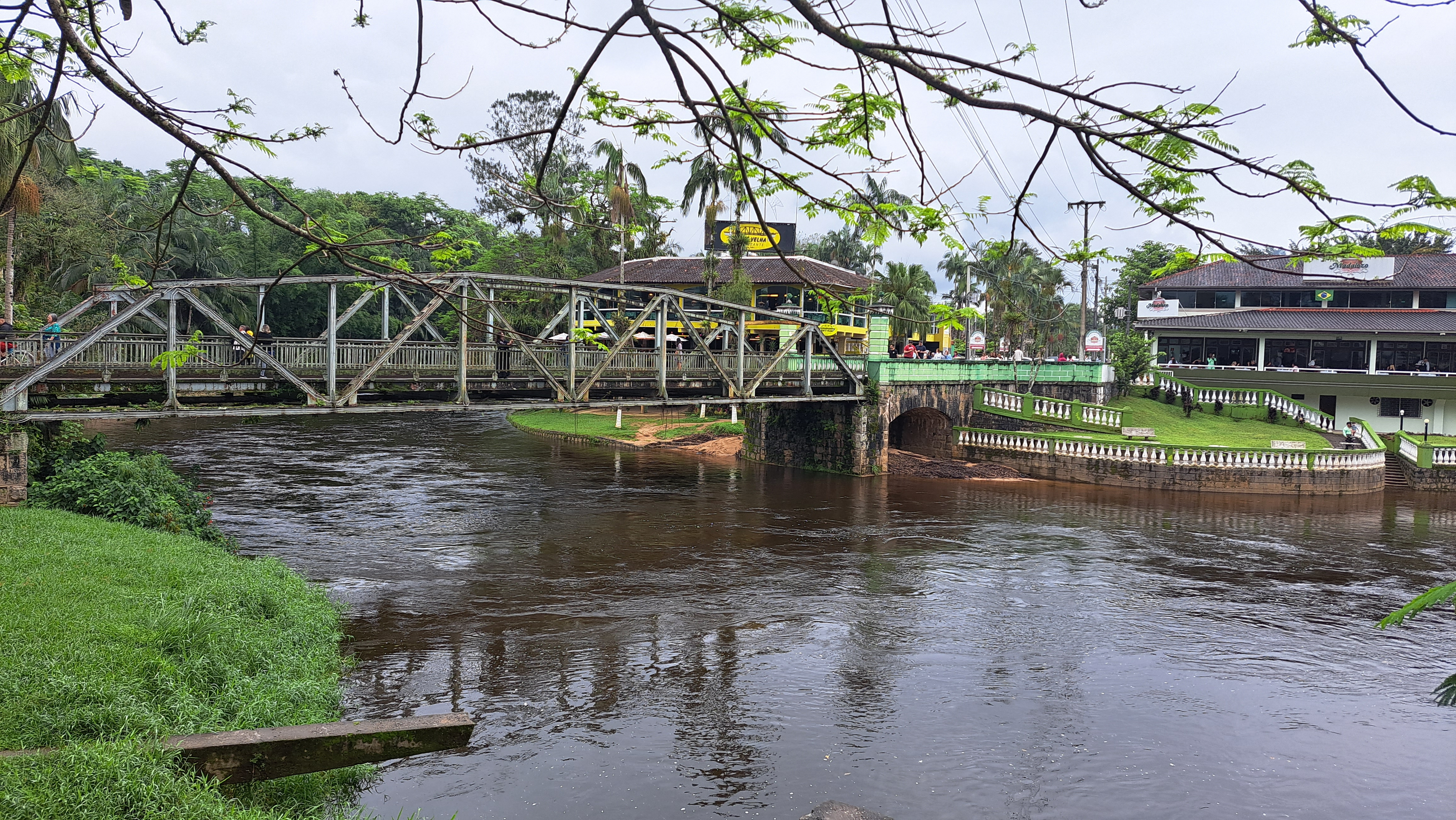
Nhundiaquara river and the Old Bridge.

Old Bridge (Ponte Velha): A steel bridge over the Nhundiaquara river that gives access to restaurants like Madalozo. Pedestrians share space with cars, considering that there is just one lane.

Touristic Train (Trem Turístico): Leaving Curitiba for Paranaguá, it passes through and stopping in Morretes. The train, which travels around 74 km between both Paraná's cities, consists of 18 wagons divided in three classes: economic, touristic and executive.

Marumbi Peak (Pico do Marumbi): Located in Paraná’s sea mountain, the state park of Marumbi remains covered in natural Brazilian Atlantic forest vegetation. Activities such as waterfall bathing, trail walking and climbing are done in this place.

Flower Street (Rua das Flores): The main street of Morretes, a boardwalk on the banks of the Nhundiaquara river with historic mansions such as the house where D. Pedro II slept, Marco Zero, fountain, restaurants and the city's first telegraph.

=== Conservation units ===
The municipality contains:

- 8,745-hectare (21,610-acre) Pico do Marumbi State Park, created in 1990
- 1,190-hectare (2,900-acre) Graciosa State Park, created in 1990
- 6% of the 199,587-hectare (493,190-acre) Guaratuba Environmental Protection Area, created in 1992
- 61% of the 2,699-hectare (6,670-acre) Roberto Ribas Lange State Park, created in 1994
- 906-hectare (2,240-acre) Pau Oco State Park, created in 1994
- About 19% of the 49,287-hectare (121,790-acre) Guaricana National Park, created in 2014 to protect a mountainous area of Atlantic Forest
