= Pico Paraná State Park =

State park in Paraná, Brazil

- Parque Estadual Pico Paraná
- IUCN category II (national park)
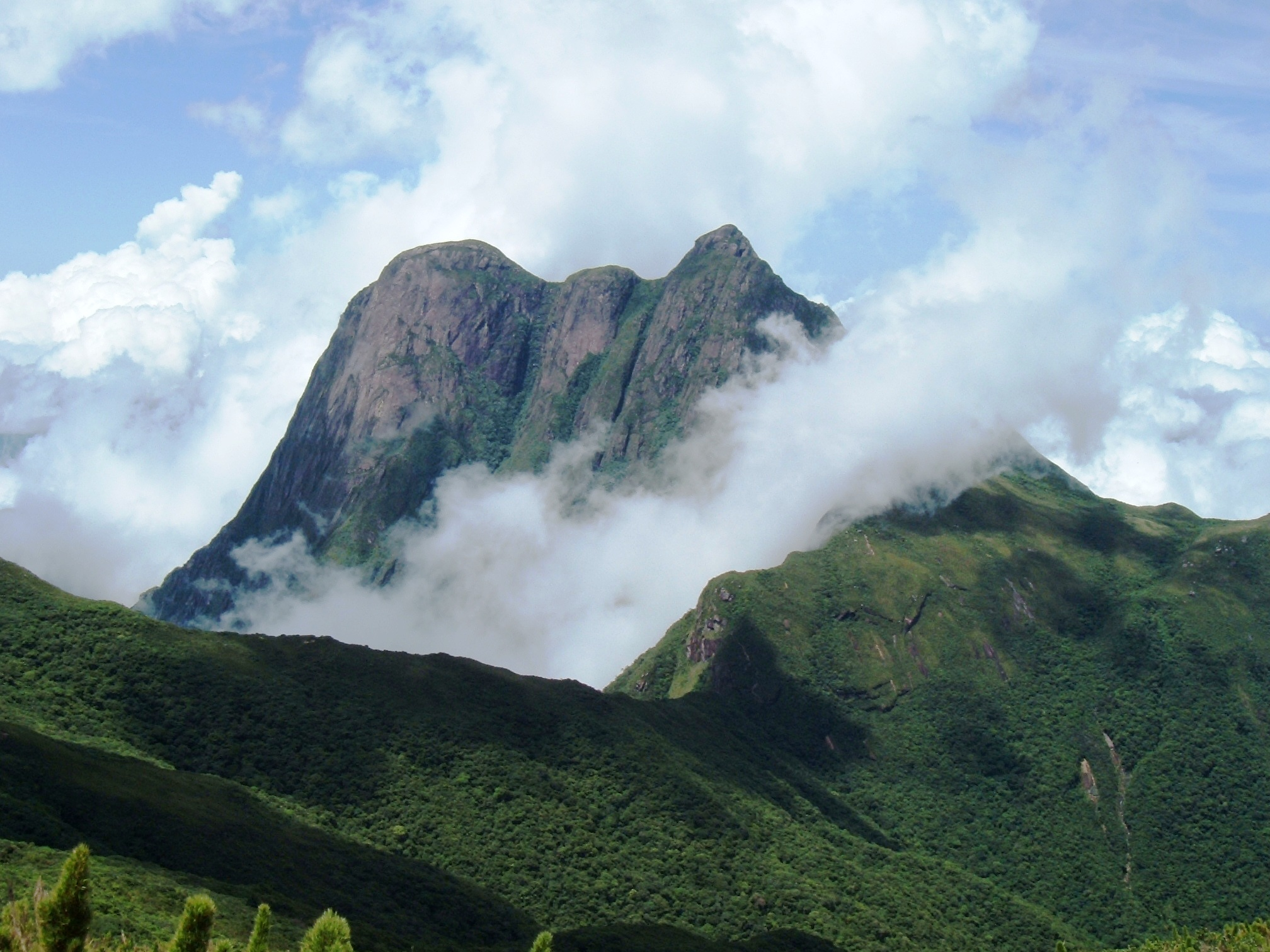
- Pico Paraná from the summit of Itapiroca

- Location within Brazil
- Nearest city: Antonina, Paraná
- Coordinates: 25.249463°S 48.806555°W
- Area: 4,333.83 hectares (10,709.1 acres)
- Designation: State park
- Created: 5 June 2002
- Administrator: Instituto Ambiental do Paraná

The Pico Paraná State Park (Portuguese: Parque Estadual Pico Paraná) is a state park in the state of Paraná, Brazil. It protects a well-preserved area of Atlantic Forest, and contains a massif that includes the highest peak in the south of Brazil. The environment is strictly protected, but visitors in good physical condition may climb the massif.

== Location ==
The Pico Paraná State Park is in the municipalities of Campina Grande do Sul and Antonina, with an area of 4,333.83 hectares (10,709.1 acres). It is part of the Lagamar Mosaic. The Pico Paraná is the highest point in the south of Brazil at 1,877.39 metres (6,159.4 ft) above sea level in the Serra Ibitiraquire. It takes six to ten hours to walk from the park entrance to the summit. Visitors must be in good physical condition and should be in a group or with an experienced guide.

The park protects a stretch of the best preserved Atlantic Forest in Brazil. The park adjoins the Graciosa State Park to the south and the Roberto Ribas Lange State Park to the north. The forest is lush and dense, with trees up to 30 metres (98 ft) high as well as shrubs, creepers and a great variety of bromeliads, orchids and ferns. Fauna include 71 species of mammals including howler monkey, squirrel, paca, hedgehog, coati, common agouti, ocelot and the endangered jaguar and cougar.

== History ==
The Pico Paraná State Park was created by state governor decree 5769 of 5 June 2002 from two areas of vacant land in the Marumbi Special Area of Tourist Interest. The objectives are to conserve a sample of dense montane and high montane rainforest, the fauna, soil and interior waters, and to promote activities that do not affect the ecosystem and that make preservation sustainable. The park was to be administered by the Paraná Institute of the Environment (IAP), which was to prepare and approve a management plan within five years.

== Sources ==
- Lerner, Jaime; Andreguetto, José Antonio; Campêlo, José Cid Filho (5 June 2002), Decreto 5769 - 05 de Junho de 2002 (in Portuguese), State of Paraná
- Ponto Mais Alto do Sul do País Fica no Parque Estadual Pico Paraná (in Portuguese), Paraná Turismo, 22 September 2015, archived from the original on 2016-11-20
- Unidades de Conservação - Mosaico do Litoral Sul de São Paulo e do Litoral do Paraná - LAGAMAR (in Portuguese), ICMBio, archived from the original on 2019-05-27
