= List of highways numbered 276 =

The following highways are numbered 276:

== Canada ==
- Manitoba Provincial Road 276
- Nova Scotia Route 276
- Quebec Route 276

== Japan ==
- Japan National Route 276

== United States ==
- Interstate 276
- U.S. Route 276
- Arkansas Highway 276
  - Arkansas Highway 276S
- California State Route 276
- Florida State Road 276
- Georgia State Route 276 (former)
- Iowa Highway 276 (former)
- K-276 (Kansas highway)
- Kentucky Route 276
- Maryland Route 276
- Montana Secondary Highway 276
- New Mexico State Road 276
- New York State Route 276
- Ohio State Route 276
- Pennsylvania Route 276 (former)
- Tennessee State Route 276
- Texas State Highway 276
  - Texas State Highway Spur 276 (former)
  - Farm to Market Road 276 (Texas)
- Utah State Route 276
- Virginia State Route 276
- Washington State Route 276

Preceded by 275	Lists of highways 276	Succeeded by 277
