= Campina Grande do Sul, Paraná =

Municipality in Paraná, Brazil

Coordinates: 25°18′21″S 49°03′18″W

- Municipality
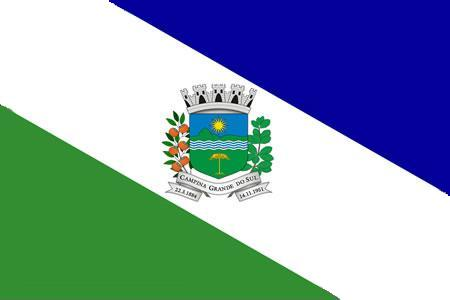
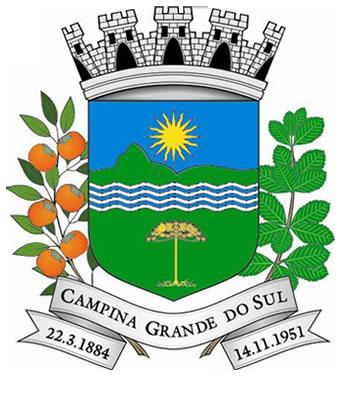
- Flag Coat of arms
- Interactive map of Campina Grande do Sul, Paraná
- Country: Brazil
- Time zone: UTC−3 (BRT)

Location in Paraná

Campina Grande do Sul, Paraná is a municipality located in the Brazilian state of Paraná. Its population was 43,685 (2020) and its area is 539.861 km^{2} (208.441 sq mi).

The municipality contains 10% of the 2,699-hectare (6,670-acre) Roberto Ribas Lange State Park, created in 1994. It contains part of the 4,334-hectare (10,710-acre) Pico Paraná State Park, created in 2002.
