= Port of Paranaguá =

Port in the city of Paranaguá, Brazil

Porto de Paranaguá
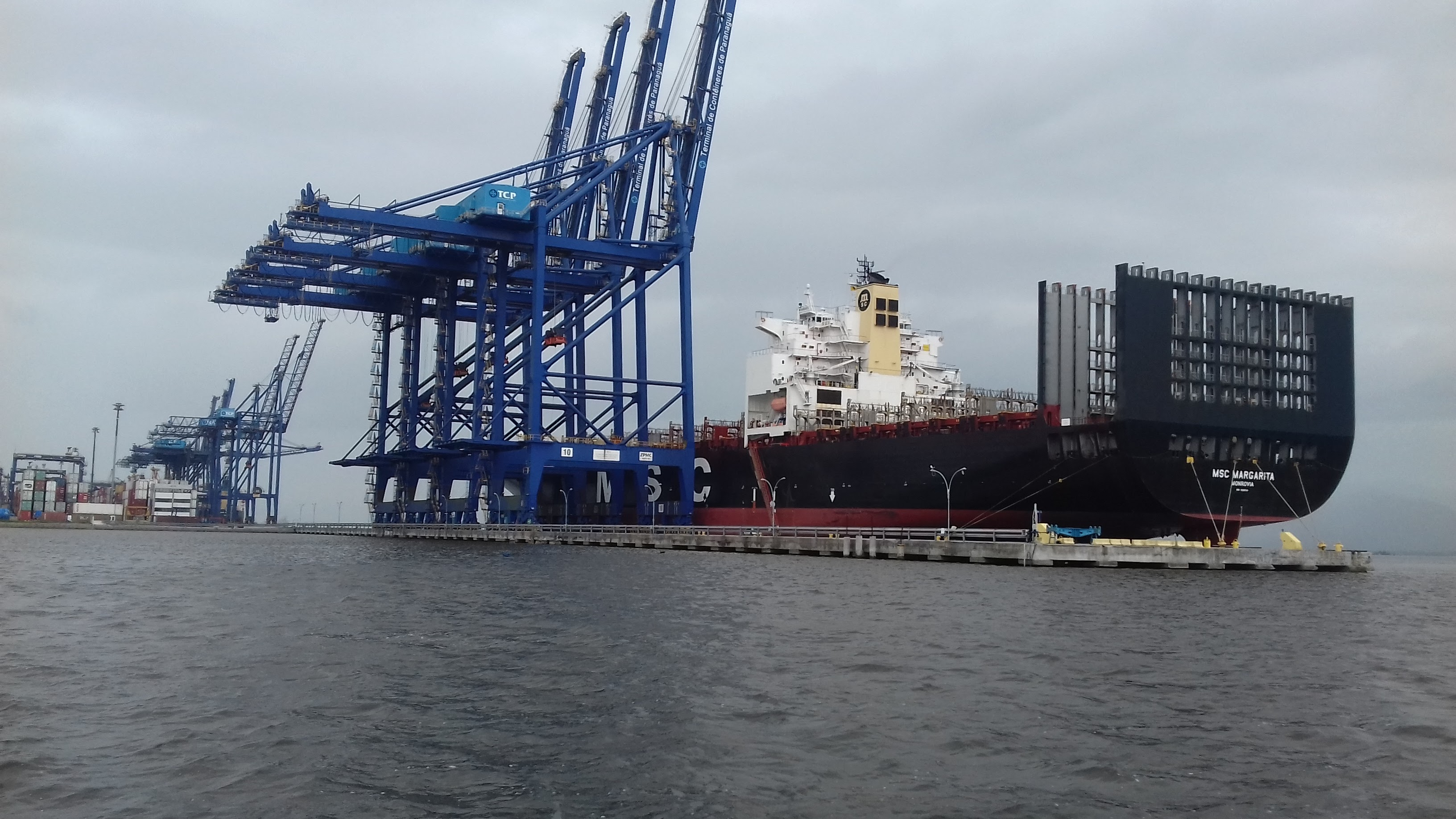
- Boat anchored in the Port of Paranaguá
- Interactive map of Porto de Paranaguá

Location
- Country: Brazil
- Location: Paranaguá, Paraná
- Coordinates: 25°30′16″S 48°30′38″W

Details
- Opened: 1935
- Owned by: Administração dos Portos de Paranaguá e Antonina
- Type of Harbor: Seaport
- Size: 171,500 m^{2} (1,846,000 sq ft)

Statistics
- Annual cargo tonnage: 56 million tonnes (2021)

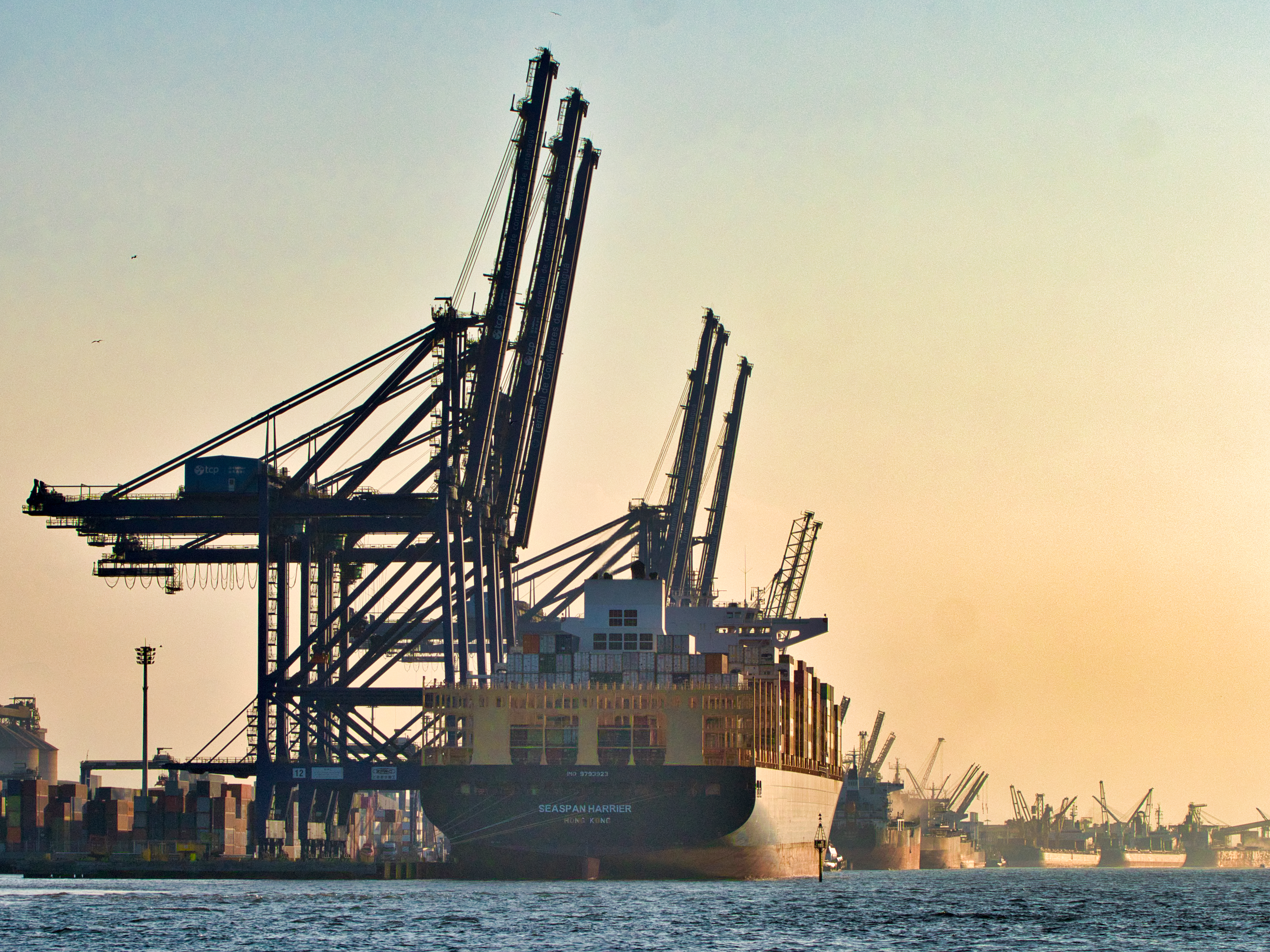
Port of Paranaguá

The Port of Paranaguá is one of the main ports of Brazil and Latin America. It is in the city of Paranaguá, in the Brazilian state of Paraná, is the second largest port of Brazil in tonnage and the third in container shipping. It is a main exporting port of agricultural products in Brazil, especially soybeans and soybean meal.

== Data ==
The port was established in 1872, as a private-owned wharf. In 1917, the State of Paraná took control of its concession, and began the works to expand the port. The new port opened in 1935. In 1947, a state organism, Administração dos Portos de Paranaguá (APP) was founded for overseeing its operation. In 1971, the APP started to also manage the Port of Antonina, becoming APPA (Administração dos Portos de Paranaguá e Antonina).

The land access system to the port is made up of BR-277, PR-401, PR-411, PR-410 and PR-412. Rail access is through the Sul-Atlântico S/A railway, Red Sur, of the former Regional Superintendency Curitiba (SR 5), from Rede Ferroviária Federal SA (RFFSA). The Paranaguá container terminal is the only one in southern Brazil that has direct rail access.

The Port of Paranaguá has its area of influence formed by the states of Mato Grosso do Sul, Mato Grosso, Santa Catarina, Rio Grande do Sul, Paraná, Paraguay, Minas Gerais and part of São Paulo.

In 1935, Paranaguá was on its way to export mate and coffee and import manufactured goods from Europe. The port, at just 400 metres (1,300 ft), handled 91,500 tons in its first year. The same as a single ship embarked, in 2020, in the largest soybean meal operation in the port of Paraná. With more than 50 million tons handled in the year, Paranaguá turned 85 years old handling 500 times more loads today than it operated at the time of its foundation.

Since the arrival of the first foreign ship, the English Somme, the size and number of ships docking in the port have changed. In the 1930s, around 400 small boats and personal watercraft moored each year. Today they number more than 2,000, are more than 330 m (1,080 ft) long and 42 m (138 ft) wide.

Maritime traffic grew as dredging and infrastructure improvements were made. The first dredging in the Port of Paranaguá dates from 1936, but it was not until 1948 that the depth was increased along the wharf and the evolution basin.

In eight decades, the types of products handled have been transforming the port of Paraná. In 1965, for example, Paranaguá was the world's largest coffee exporter. With the end of the product cycle, in the 1970s, shipments of corn and timber arrived. Porto has already exported loads such as crystallized menthol, which was the basis for the production of toothpaste and mint. They were loaded onto ships in barrels and boxes; it already had the shipment of soy lecithin, sassafras oil, broom handles and even a square of guatambu (ivory wood), which was exported to Europe to make furniture legs, as well as noble woods such as pine and cinnamon.

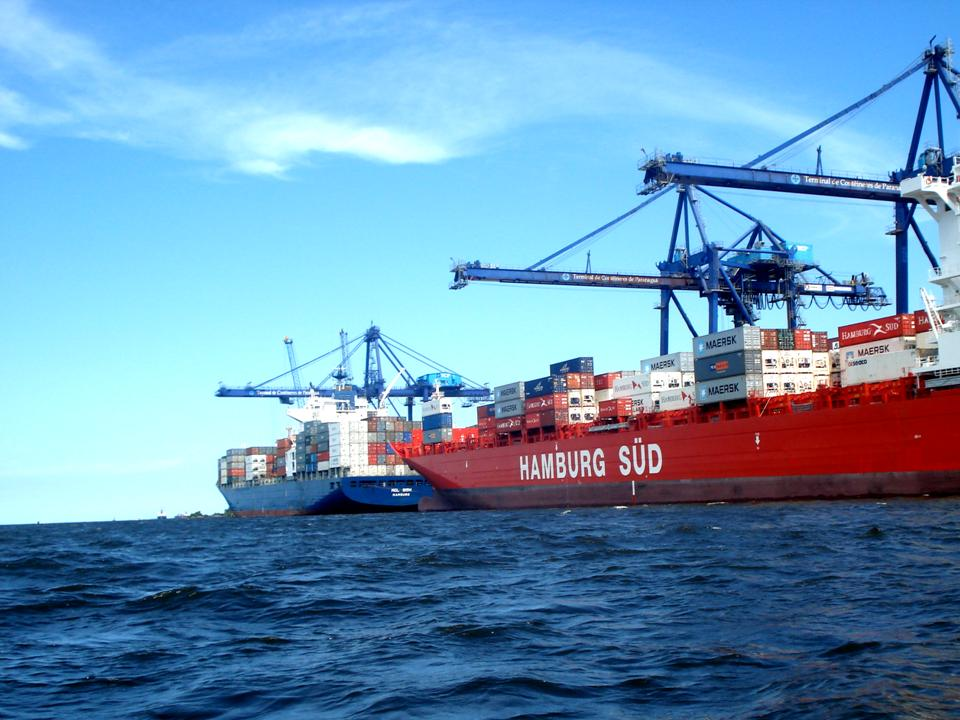
Port of Paranaguá

Currently, Paranaguá is the first port in Brazil in the export of soy flour and vegetable oil, the second in the export of sugar, paper (coil), frozen products, alcohol and vehicles, and the third in the shipment of soy and wood. The port of Paraná is also a leader in the import of fertilizers and represents 34% of all fertilizer imports in the country.

In 2020, it presented more than 57 million tons of product movement. With 14.2 million tons of soybeans exported, 5.4 million tons of soybean meal and 2.5 million tons of corn.

The Port of Paranaguá is the largest bulk port in Latin America. It is also the third largest container port in Brazil, only surpassed by Itajaí and Santos. It is the largest port in Brazil for the export of grains. It exports and imports grains, fertilizers, containers, liquids, automobiles, wood, paper, salt, and sugar, among others. Most of the ships from other countries are from the United States, China, Japan and South Korea.
