= List of highways numbered 279 =

The following highways are numbered 279:

== Canada ==
- Manitoba Provincial Road 279
- Quebec Route 279

== Japan ==
- Japan National Route 279

== United States ==
- Interstate 279
- Alabama State Route 279
- Arizona State Route 279 (former)
- Arkansas Highway 279
- Delaware Route 279
- Florida State Road 279 (former)
- Georgia State Route 279
- Iowa Highway 279 (former)
- K-279 (Kansas highway)
- Kentucky Route 279
- Maryland Route 279
- Montana Secondary Highway 279
- New Mexico State Road 279
- New York State Route 279
- North Carolina Highway 279
- Ohio State Route 279
- Tennessee State Route 279
- Texas State Highway 279
  - Texas State Highway Loop 279
  - Farm to Market Road 279 (Texas)
- Utah State Route 279
- Vermont Route 279
- Virginia State Route 279
- West Virginia Route 279

Preceded by 278	Lists of highways 279	Succeeded by 280
