= Port of Antonina =

Port in Paraná, Brazil

Antonina
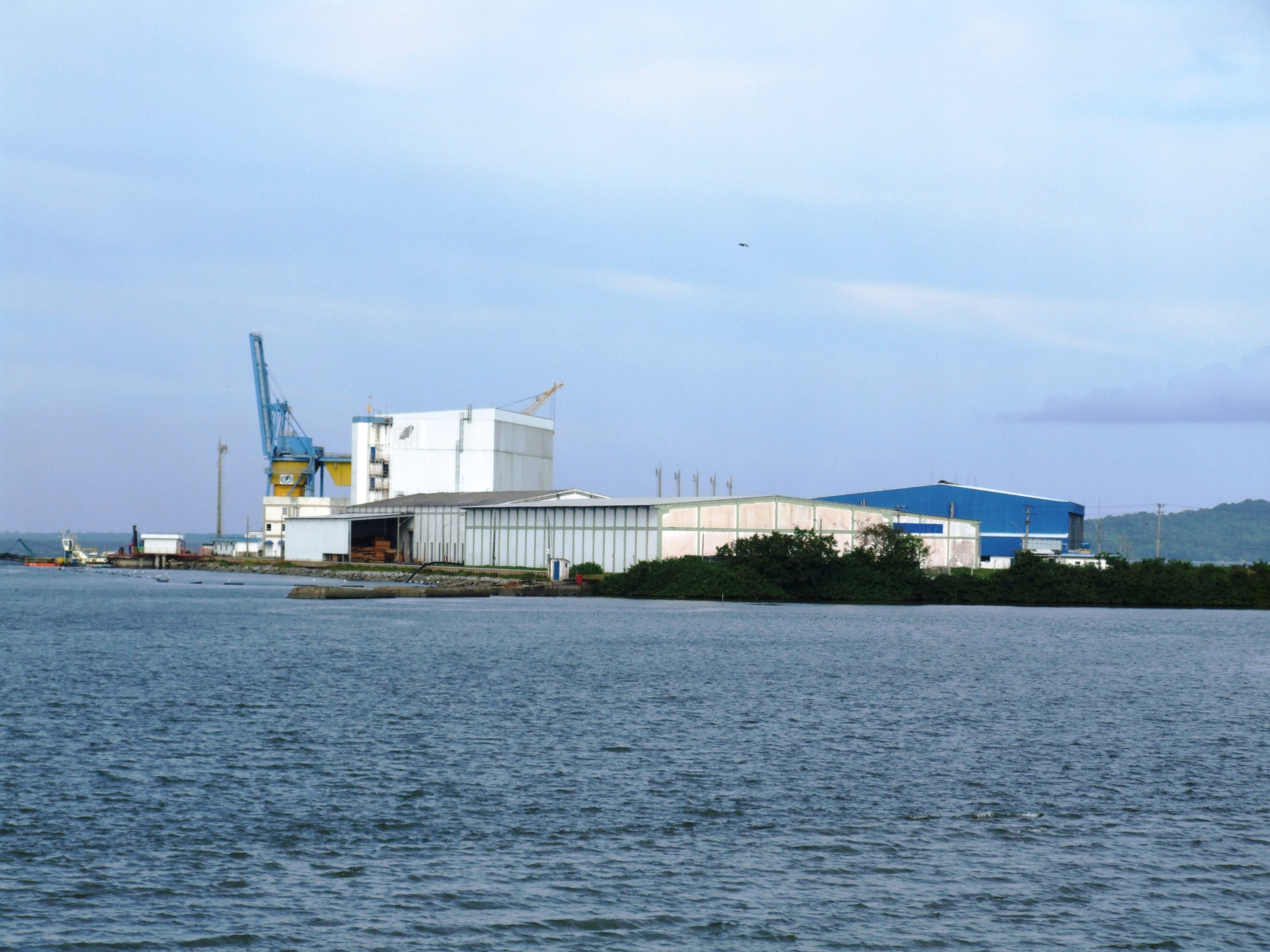
- The Port of Antonina as seen from Ponta da Pita.
- Click on the map for a fullscreen view

Location
- Country: Brazil
- Location: Antonina, Paraná
- Coordinates: 25°27′25.94″S 48°40′35.15″W

Details
- Size: 256.622,95 m²

The Port of Antonina is a Brazilian port located in the municipality of Antonina, in the state of Paraná. Currently, the port is part of the complex managed by the Association of the Ports of Paranaguá and Antonina (APPA). In the 1920s it was considered the 4th largest port in exports in Brazil.

Located in a strategic point for the flow of production, the Port of Antonina extends the agility and quality of services of the Port of Paranaguá, offering two port terminals: The Barão de Teffé and the Ponta do Félix.

== History ==
In 1856, the first pier was built in Antonina, establishing the regular line of steamboats from Antonina to Paranaguá. In 1870, the Admiral Baron of Teffé, Antônio Luís von Hoonholtz, interceded for the railroad that would link Antonina with the Ministry of Agriculture, Commerce, and Public Works. In 1880, Pedro II arrived at Antonina with his entourage on board of the ship Rio Grande. Two years later, the railroad branch between Antonina and Morretes was inaugurated, improving the logistics of the port.

In 1904, the Matarazzo family acquired land in the city to build the Matarazzo Industrial Complex, intensifying the economic activity in the region. In 1917, the port facilities were completed, including industrial buildings and houses for the port employees.

In 1926, the port of Antonina was considered the main port in the transportation of mate. In overall exports, it became the fourth-largest in Brazil. However, in the 1930s, such transportation decreased with the fall in production. In the next decade, with the Second World War, the port lost strength and importance.

In 1958, the Port Captaincy building was inaugurated there. In 1960, coffee exports were allowed through the terminal. At that time the port had 318 stevedores. In 1971, a new administrative proposal emerged and the port of Antonina joined the port of Paranaguá, under the Administration of the ports of Paranaguá and Antonina. Still, in the 1970s, the Matarazzo Complex faced a strong crisis and decided, in 1972, to close down activities in Antonina.

In 1989, the terminal of Antonina started receiving cargoes of fertilizer and salt and in 1992 the government of Paraná started dredging the access channel to the port. In 1999, the cargo terminals at Ponta do Felix started operating and two years later the refrigerated terminal was inaugurated. In 2011, the Port of Antonina recovered its cargo handling, as an alternative to the unloading of fertilizers.

== Data ==
The port currently has two terminals, the Barão de Teffé, and the Ponta do Félix, the latter with an area of 2.839.519 thousand square feet (263.8 thousand square meters) and two berths in 1180 feet (360 meters) of dock. The main cargoes that pass through the terminals are frozen foods, fertilizers, and iron ore. The current import capacity is 2 million tons with projections to double this capacity to 4 million tons.

In 2013, the port recorded 1.573.406 tons of shipped volume. With dredging work in 2014, the port now allows ships up to 45,000 tons. In 2015, a private investment of 160 million reais (approximately 30 million dollars) was announced over the next few years, including the construction of a new berth at the Ponta do Félix Terminal and two new 120,000-ton warehouses.
