= Interstate 277 =

Interstate 277 is the designation for two Interstate Highways in the United States, both of which are related to Interstate 77 (I-77):

- Interstate 277 (North Carolina), a loop in Uptown Charlotte, N.C.
- Interstate 277 (Ohio), a connection in Akron, Ohio
- South Carolina Highway 277, a spur in Columbia that was originally proposed as Interstate 277
