= Antonina, Paraná =

Antonina
- Municipality
- Municipality of Antonina
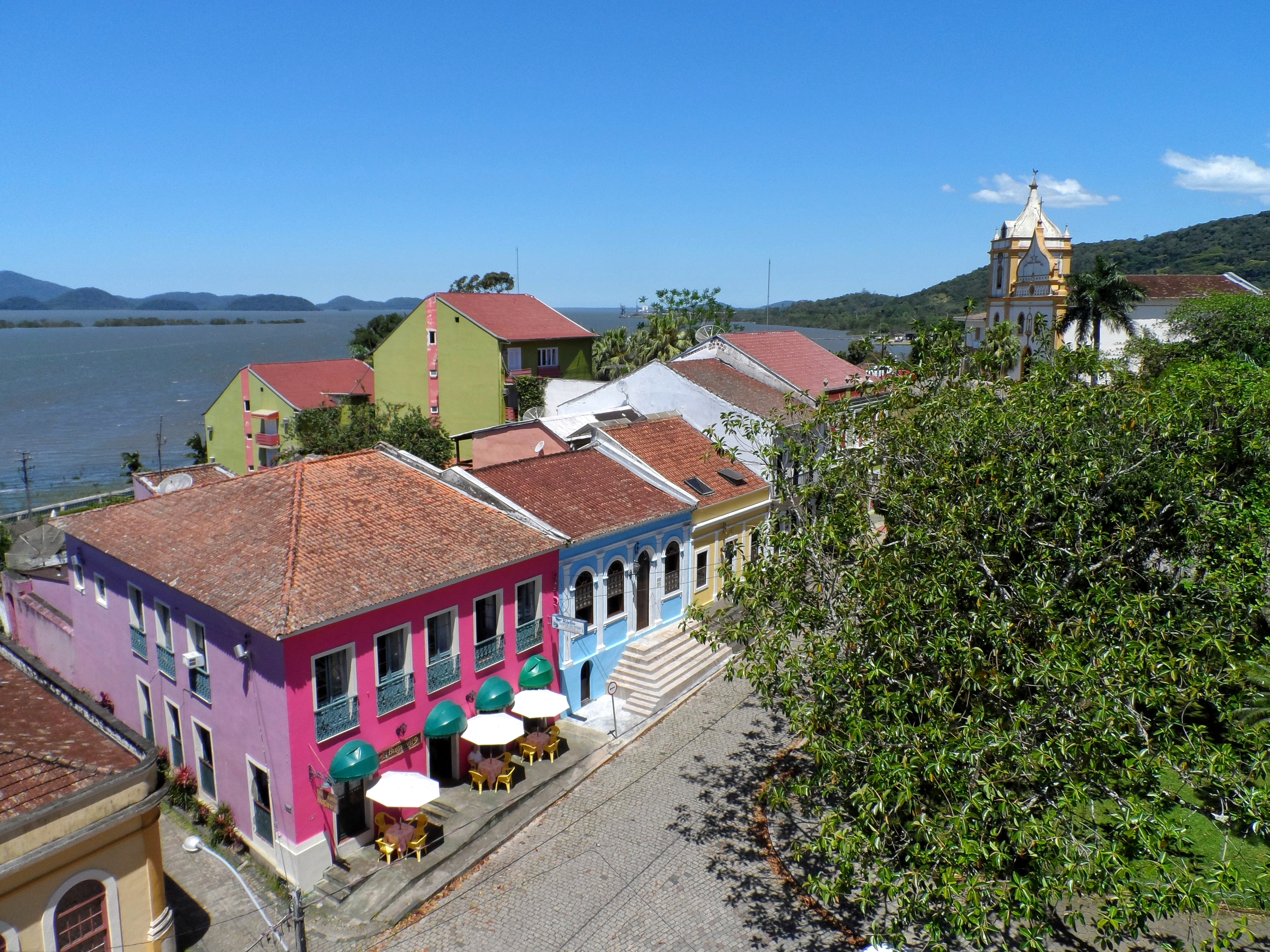
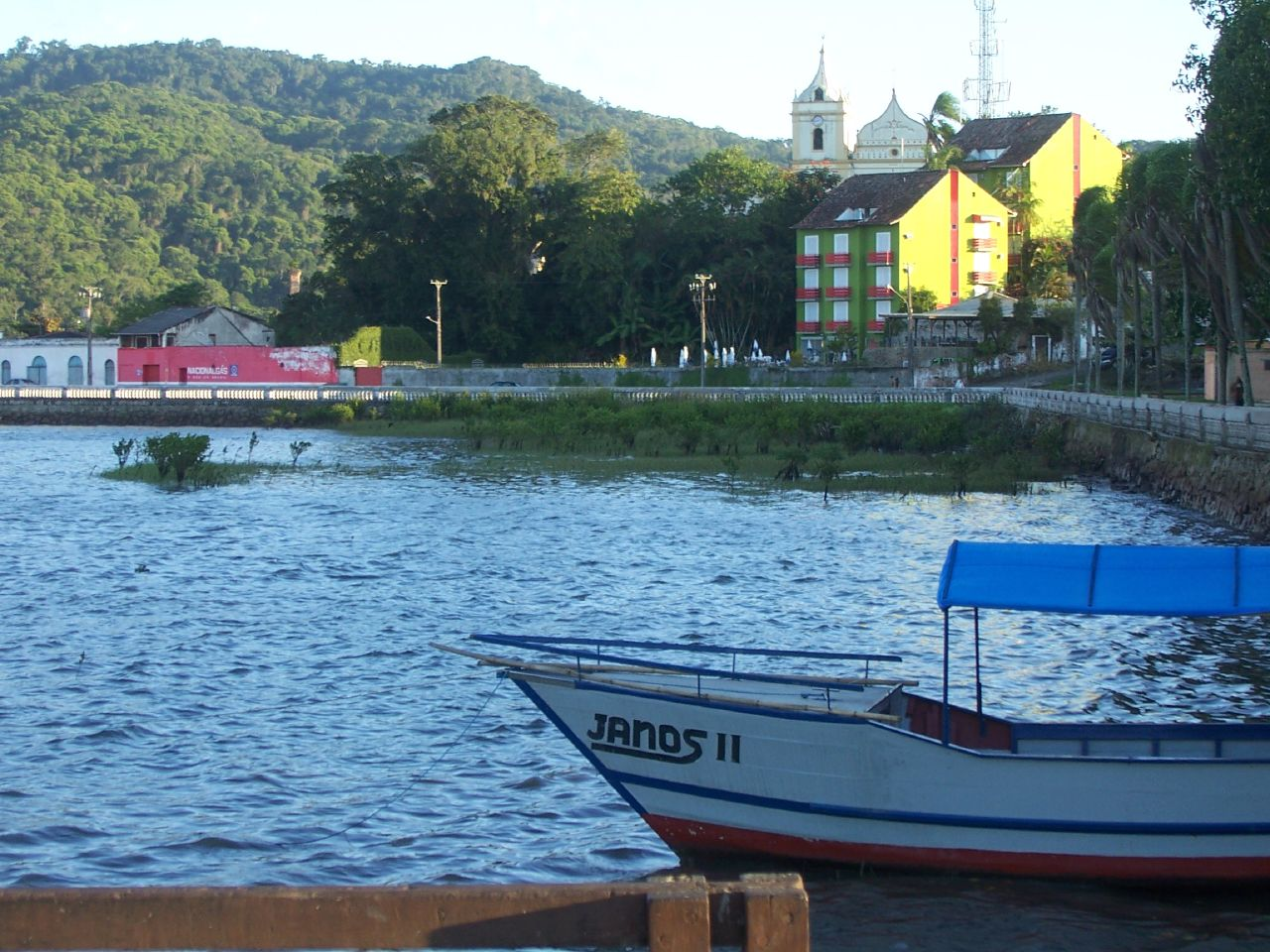
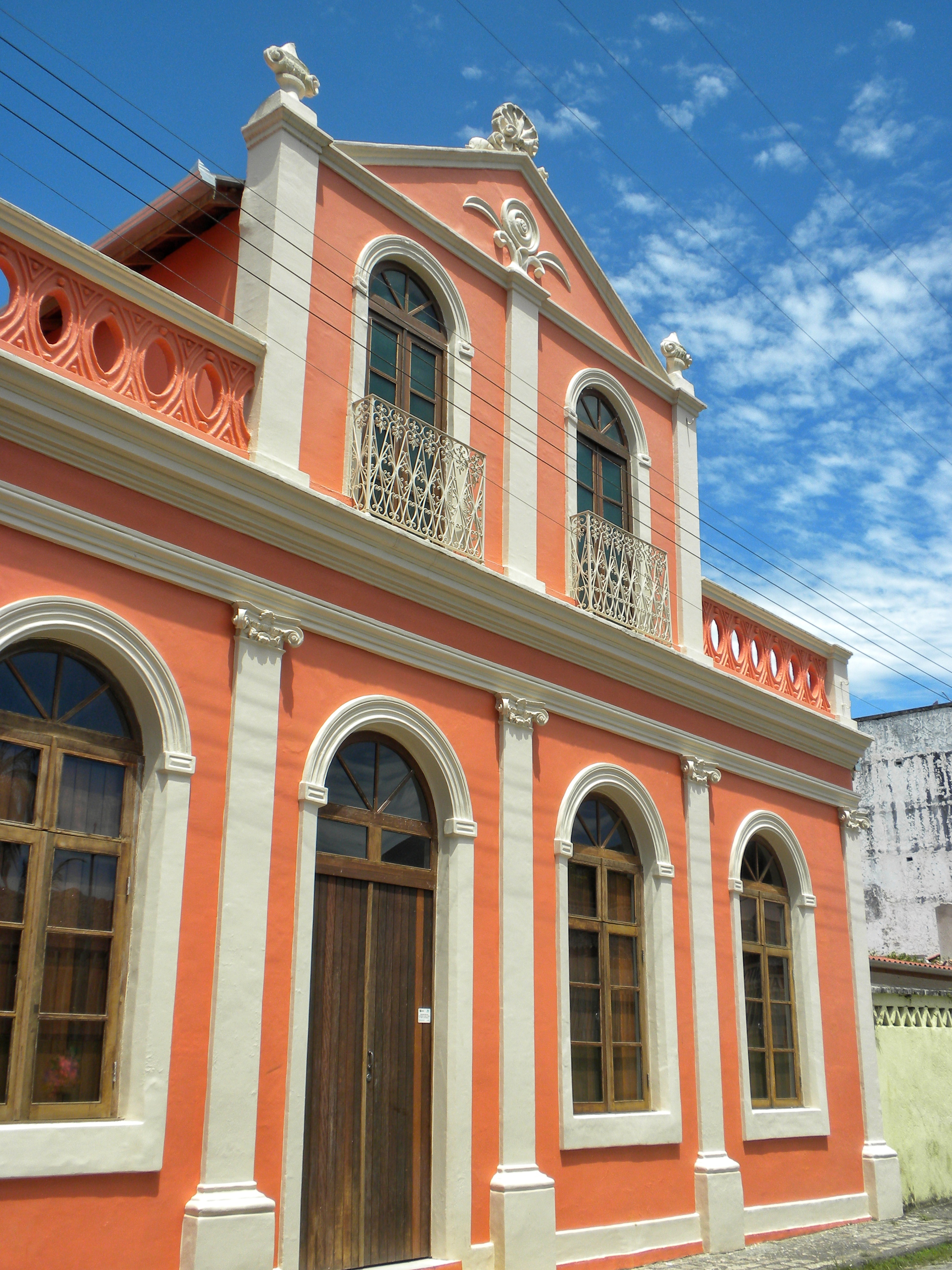
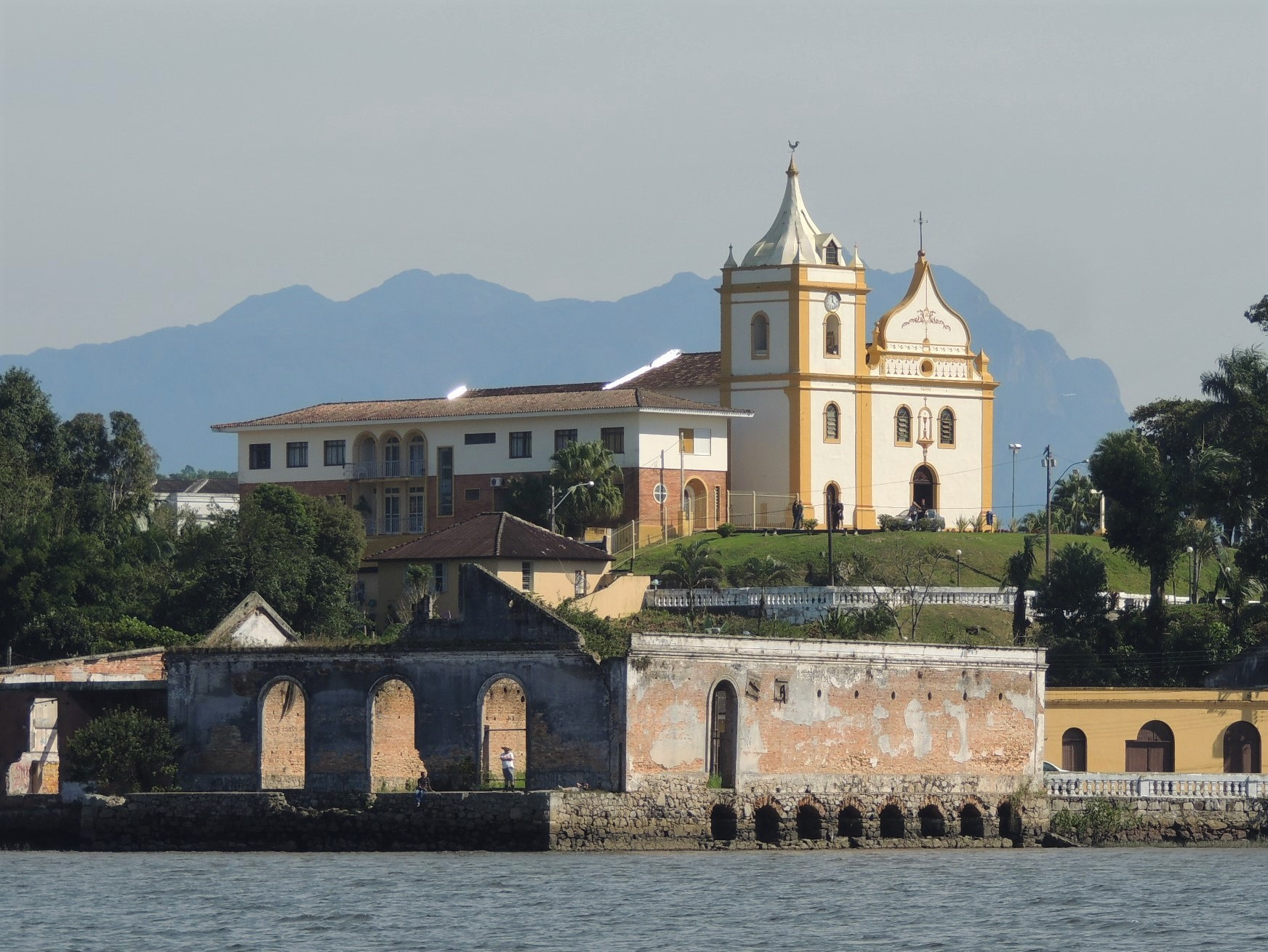
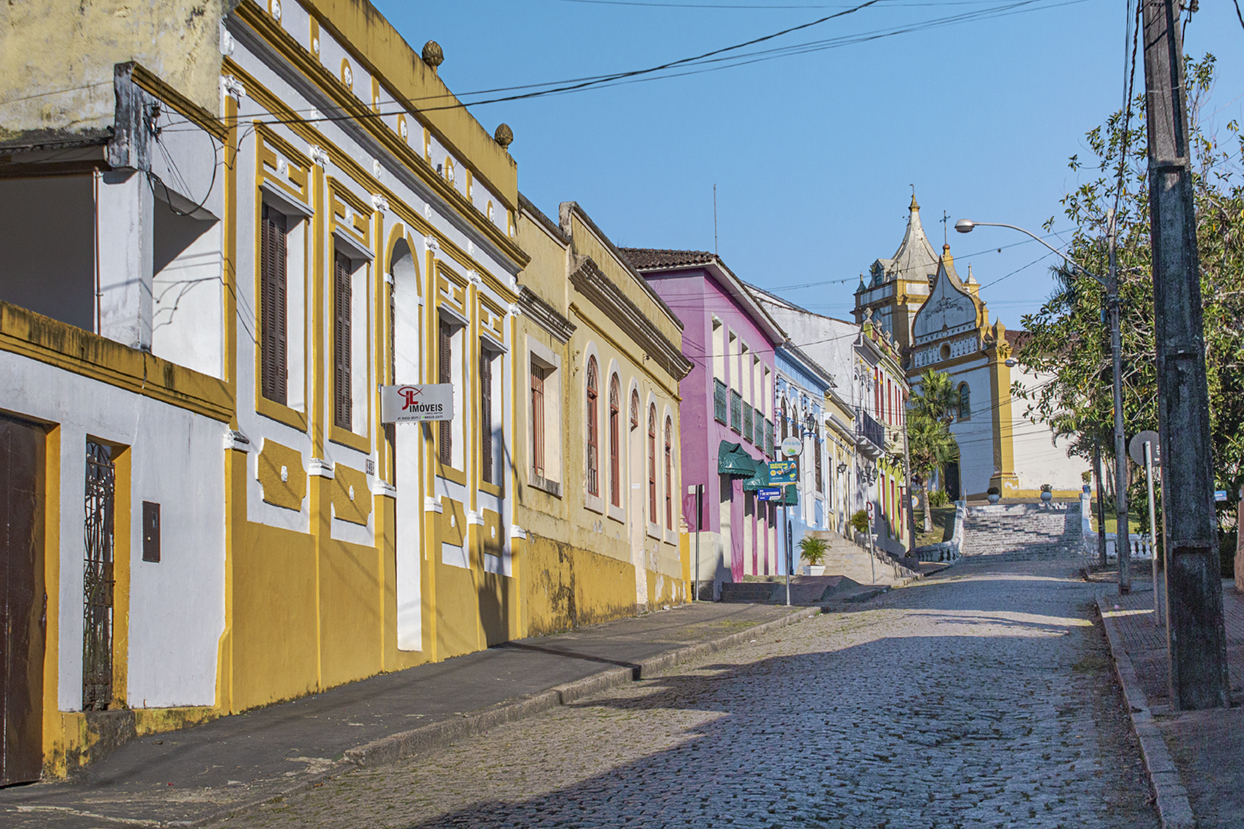
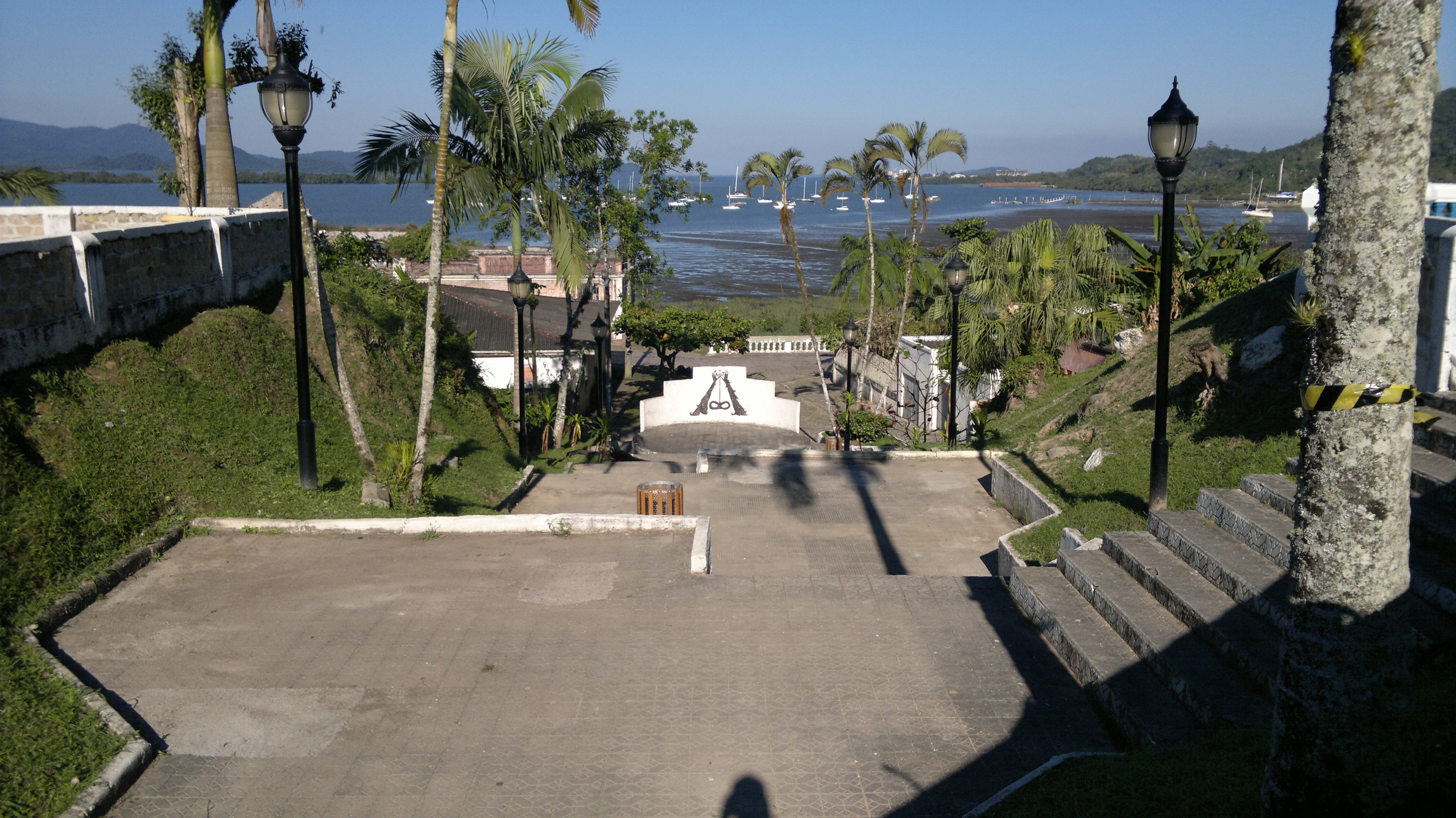
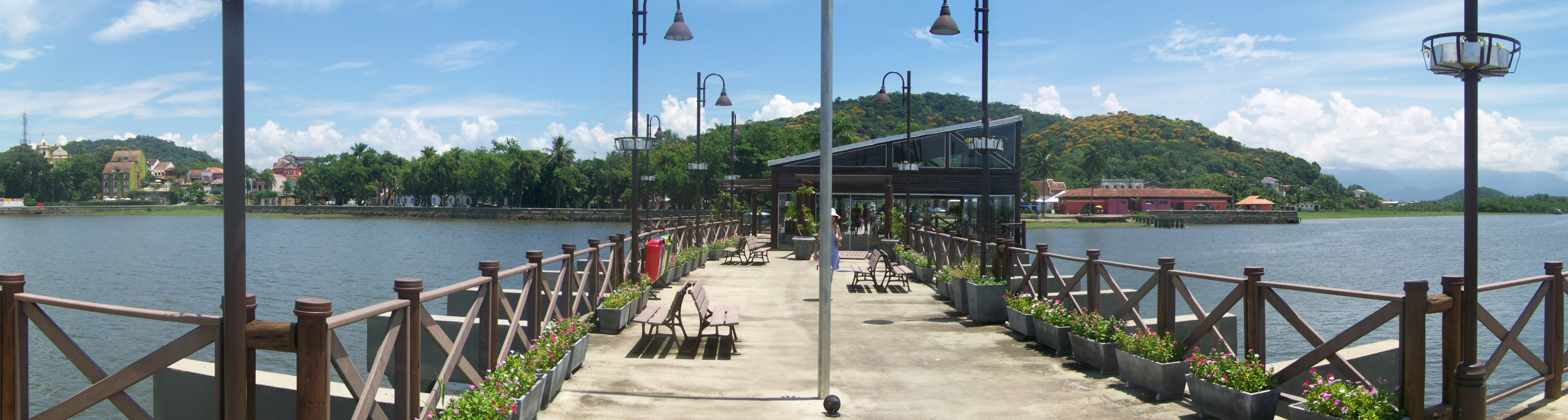

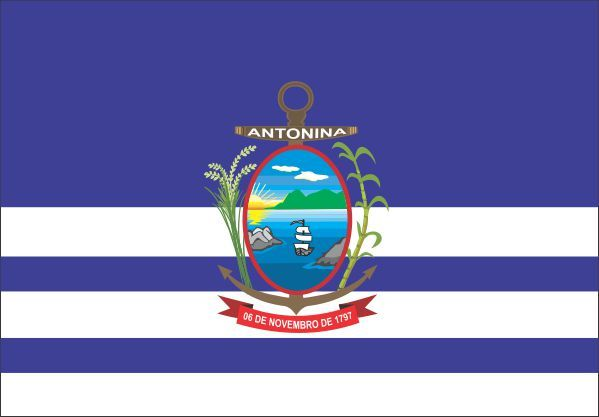
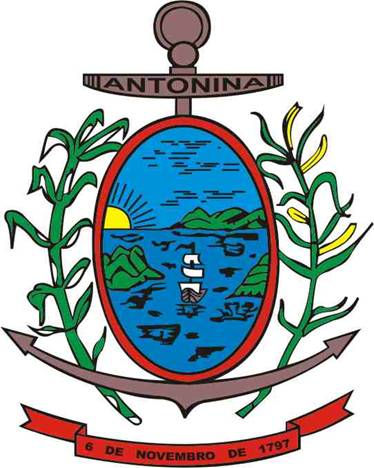
- Flag Coat of arms

- Location in Paraná
- Country: Brazil
- Region: South
- State: Paraná
- Founded: 12 September 1714

Government
  - Mayor: Jose Paulo Vieira Azim (PSD)

Area
  - Total: 845.853 km^{2} (326.586 sq mi)

Population (2020)
  - Total: 18,949
  - Density: 22.402/km^{2} (58.022/sq mi)
- Time zone: UTC−3 (BRT)
- HDI (2010): 0.687 – medium
- Website: antonina.pr.gov.br

Antonina is a municipality in the state of Paraná in southern Brazil. As of 2020, the estimated population was 18,949.

== Geography ==
Antonina has an area of 845.853 square kilometres (326.586 sq mi). It is located at 25°6′0″S 48°43′00″W. It is 80 km away from Curitiba.

The municipality contains 29% of the 2,699-hectare (6,670-acre) Roberto Ribas Lange State Park, created in 1994. It contains part of the 4,334-hectare (10,710-acre) Pico Paraná State Park, created in 2002. It also holds 30% of the 34,179-hectare (84,460-acre) Bom Jesus Biological Reserve, a strictly protected conservation unit established in 2012.

== History ==
The small town of Antonina was former known as "Capela" – as a chapel was built here in the 18th century. Due to this fact the inhabitants are called "capelistas" to this day. The official name is in honor to King Antonio of Portugal.

== Culture ==
Antonina hosts a July winter festival promoted by the Federal University of Paraná, which develops several workshops and shows during this time in the village. The carnival takes place within several blocks and features samba groups.

== Climate ==
Climate data for Antonina, Paraná, elevation 60 m (200 ft), (1976–2005)
Month	Jan	Feb	Mar	Apr	May	Jun	Jul	Aug	Sep	Oct	Nov	Dec	Year
Record high °C (°F)	37.4 (99.3)	36.7 (98.1)	35.0 (95.0)	33.3 (91.9)	30.9 (87.6)	30.8 (87.4)	31.7 (89.1)	32.9 (91.2)	33.4 (92.1)	33.2 (91.8)	35.2 (95.4)	36.4 (97.5)	37.4 (99.3)
Mean daily maximum °C (°F)	30.2 (86.4)	—	28.9 (84.0)	27.1 (80.8)	24.7 (76.5)	22.8 (73.0)	22.3 (72.1)	21.4 (70.5)	23.2 (73.8)	25.2 (77.4)	27.6 (81.7)	29.3 (84.7)	—
Daily mean °C (°F)	24.5 (76.1)	24.3 (75.7)	23.1 (73.6)	21.0 (69.8)	18.2 (64.8)	16.7 (62.1)	16.0 (60.8)	17.0 (62.6)	18.5 (65.3)	20.5 (68.9)	22.6 (72.7)	23.6 (74.5)	20.5 (68.9)
Mean daily minimum °C (°F)	20.2 (68.4)	20.5 (68.9)	19.8 (67.6)	18.0 (64.4)	15.3 (59.5)	12.6 (54.7)	12.4 (54.3)	12.5 (54.5)	14.2 (57.6)	16.1 (61.0)	17.9 (64.2)	19.2 (66.6)	16.6 (61.8)
Record low °C (°F)	16.3 (61.3)	17.2 (63.0)	16.1 (61.0)	12.9 (55.2)	8.8 (47.8)	5.7 (42.3)	5.8 (42.4)	5.8 (42.4)	9.3 (48.7)	10.8 (51.4)	13.6 (56.5)	15.2 (59.4)	5.7 (42.3)
Average precipitation mm (inches)	327.6 (12.90)	301.3 (11.86)	281.0 (11.06)	133.1 (5.24)	113.1 (4.45)	93.7 (3.69)	101.1 (3.98)	72.3 (2.85)	141.4 (5.57)	156.0 (6.14)	186.7 (7.35)	241.4 (9.50)	2,148.7 (84.59)
Average relative humidity (%)	84	85	87	87	87	87	87	86	86	85	83	82	86
Mean monthly sunshine hours	108	106	102	107	113	108	101	99	79	77	94	105	1,199
Source: Empresa Brasileira de Pesquisa Agropecuária (EMBRAPA)

== See also ==
- Port of Antonina
