= Interstate 280 =

Interstate 280 may refer to multiple highways, all of which are or were related to Interstate 80:

- Interstate 280 (California), a north–south freeway running from San Jose to San Francisco
- Interstate 280 (Iowa–Illinois), part of the beltway around the Quad Cities
- Interstate 280 (Ohio), a connector in Toledo from Interstates 80/90 to Interstate 75
- Interstate 280 (New Jersey), a connector from Interstate 80 to Interstate 95 in Newark
- Interstate 276, once designated as I-280 when I-76 was I-80S
- Interstate 680 (Nebraska–Iowa), once designated as I-280
