= BR-277 (Brazil highway) =

Highway in Paraná, Brazil

BR-277

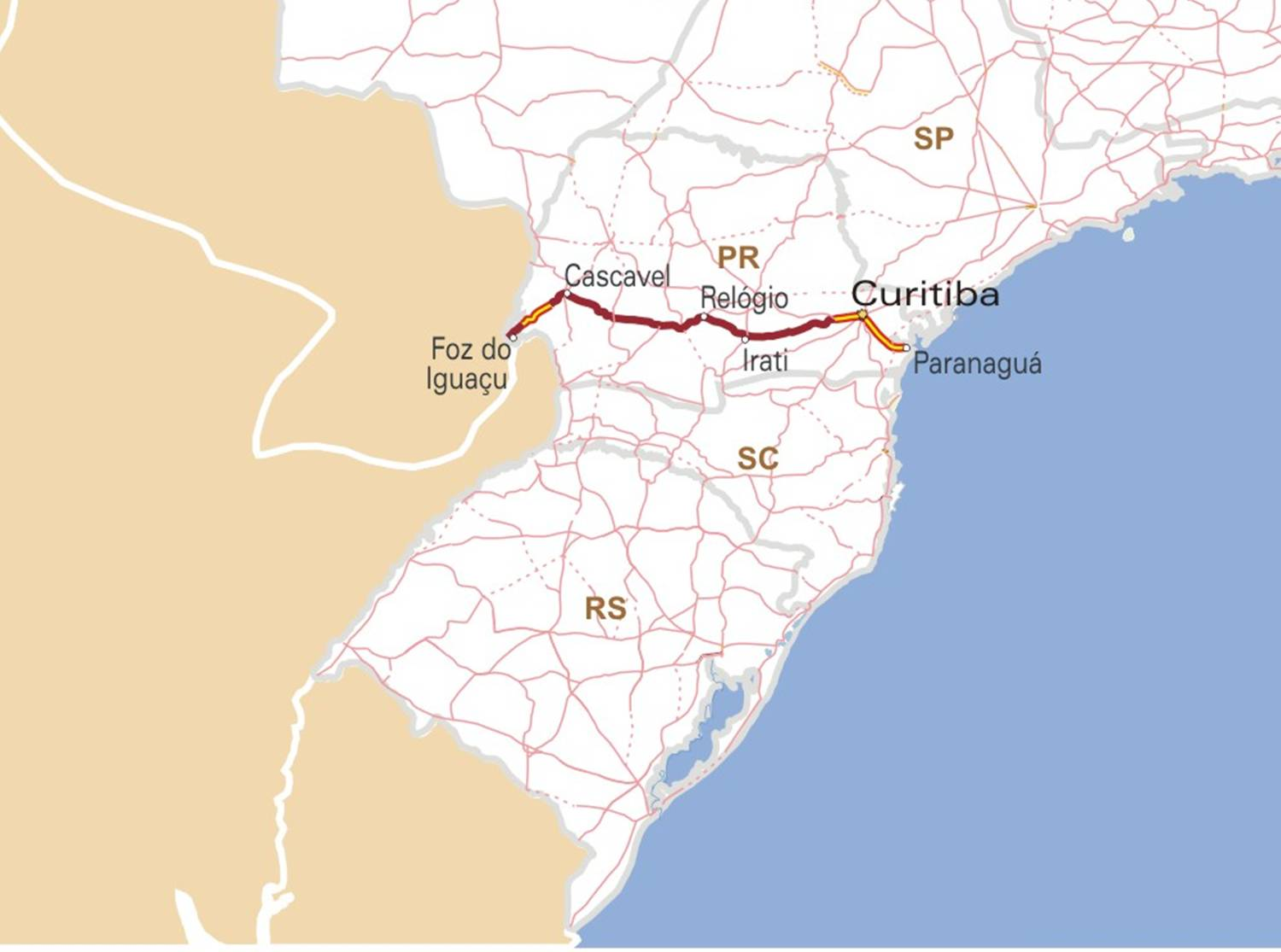

Route information
- Length: 736.6 km (457.7 mi)

Major junctions
- East end: Paranaguá, Paraná
- West end: Foz do Iguaçu, Paraná

Location
- Country: Brazil

Highway system
- Highways in Brazil; Federal

BR-277 is a federal highway of Brazil, across the state of Paraná, between the town of Paranaguá and Foz do Iguaçu.

== Economic importance ==
The highway has high economic importance for Brazil and even for Paraguay, as it connects the Brazil-Paraguay border with Port of Paranaguá. On the border there is intense trade between the two countries; there is great tourism in the Foz do Iguaçu area due to the border trade and mainly because of the Iguaçu Falls. In Paraná, there is high production of soy, corn, chicken, milk, cellulose and fish, among other products (which are exported in Paranaguá), and Paraguay uses the port to carry out part of its exports.

== Duplications ==
The highway is duplicated in the 140 km between the Port of Paranaguá, Curitiba and the junction with the BR-376.

BR-277, as well as BRs 369 and 376, which form a triangle within the state of Paraná, were granted to private companies in 1997, at the beginning of the era of road concessions in Brazil. The contracts are valid until 2021. Initially, 995 km of roads in Paraná should be duplicated, and the population was promised that the State would have First World highways, strongly boosting economic growth. But additions were soon signed that removed duplications and other works from the contracts. The duplication commitment fell from 995 to 616 km. To make matters worse, in 2019, what had been doubled was no more than 300 km, even with toll rates rising every year. The MPF (Federal Public Ministry) then carried out Operation Integration, which showed that the changes made to the contracts are part of a millionaire kickback scheme. The companies paid at least R $ 35 million in fees to achieve these changes in contracts. The estimated diversion of money in the toll system amounts to R $ 8.4 billion. Some of those cited by the MPF to receive these fees are: Jaime Lerner, Roberto Requião and Beto Richa, all former governors of the State of Paraná, and the concessionaires Rodonorte, Econorte, Ecovía, Ecocataratas, Caminhos do Paraná and Viapar.

For the next concession, to take place in 2021, the Federal Government, under the command of Jair Bolsonaro, and the Government of the State of Paraná, under the command of Ratinho Júnior, intend, together, adopt a model with lower tariffs, ensure that duplications occur quickly, and also ensure transparency in spending.

== Main Cities ==
- km 0 Paranaguá (km 730 from Foz do Iguaçu)
- km 90 Curitiba (km 640 from Foz do Iguaçu)
- km 130 Campo Largo (km 600 from Foz do Iguaçu)
- km 215 Ponta Grossa (km 515 from Foz do Iguaçu)
- km 250 Irati (km 480 from Foz do Iguaçu)
- km 360 Guarapuava (km 370 from Foz do Iguaçu)
- km 460 Laranjeiras do Sul (km 270 from Foz do Iguaçu)
- km 595 Cascavel (km 135 from Foz do Iguaçu)
- km 670 Medianeira (km 60 from Foz do Iguaçu)
- km 710 Santa Terezinha de Itaipu (km 20 from Foz do Iguaçu)
- km 730 Foz do Iguaçu

== Gallery ==
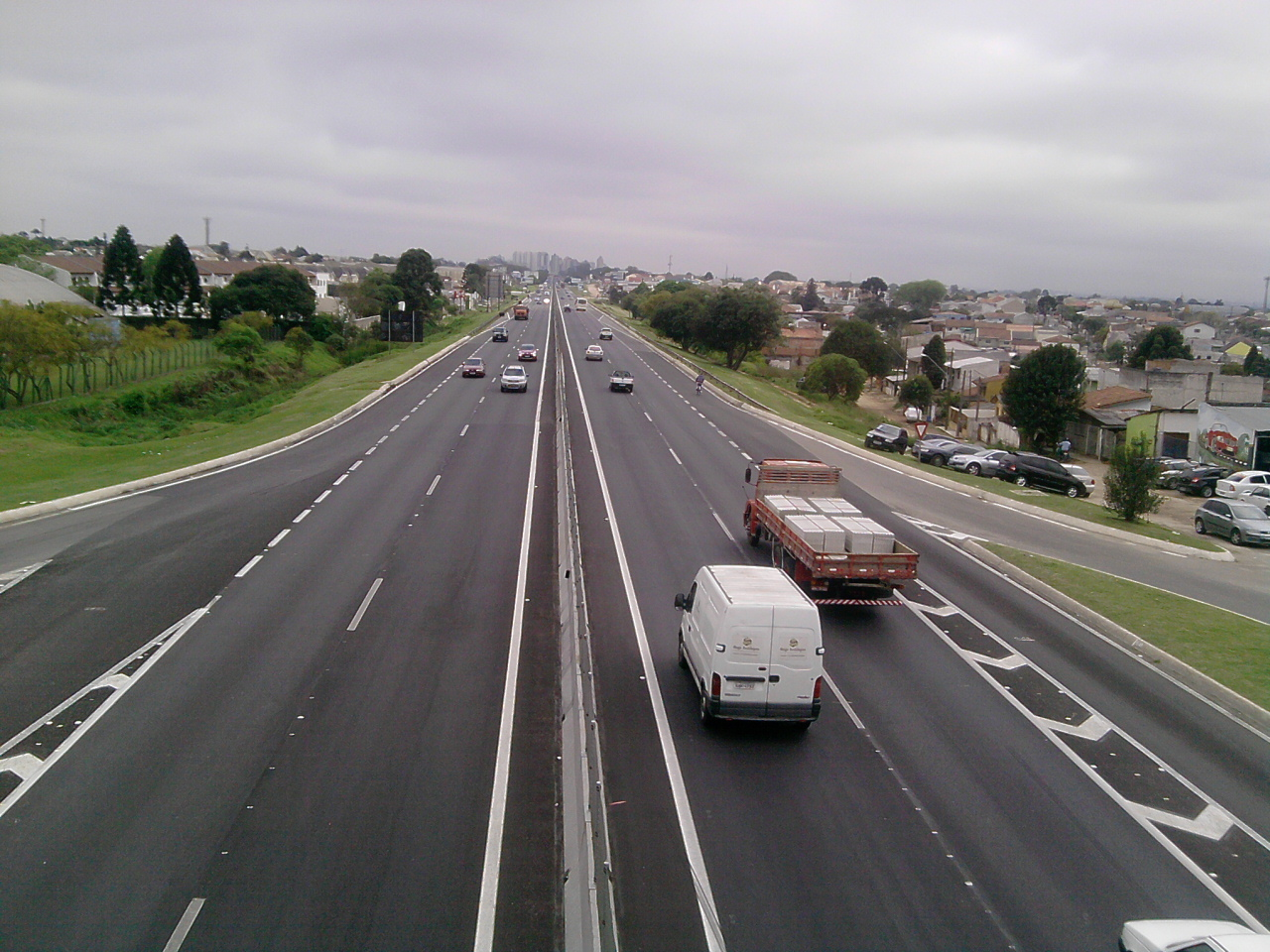
BR-277 in Curitiba.

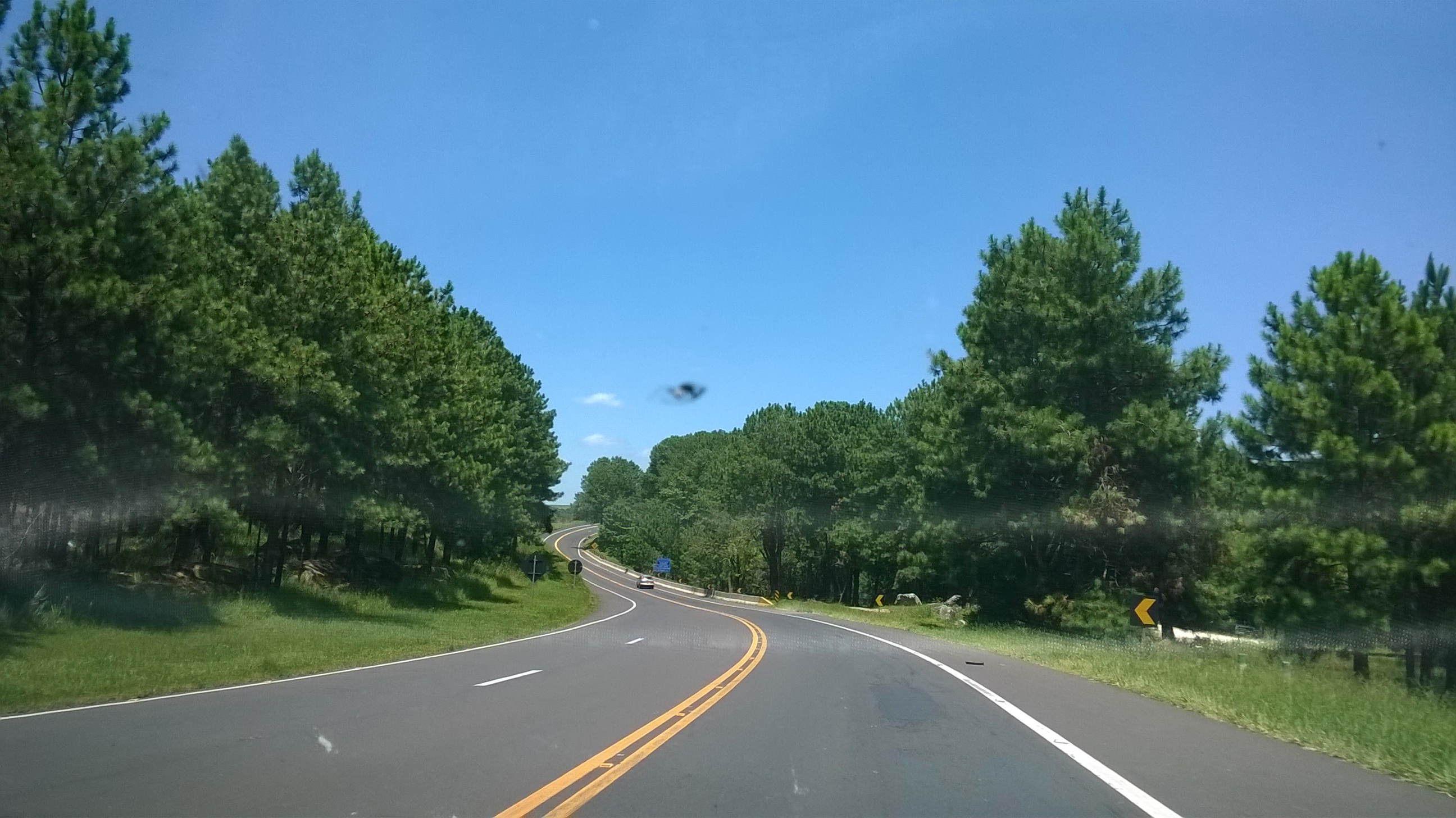
BR-277 in Balsa Nova.

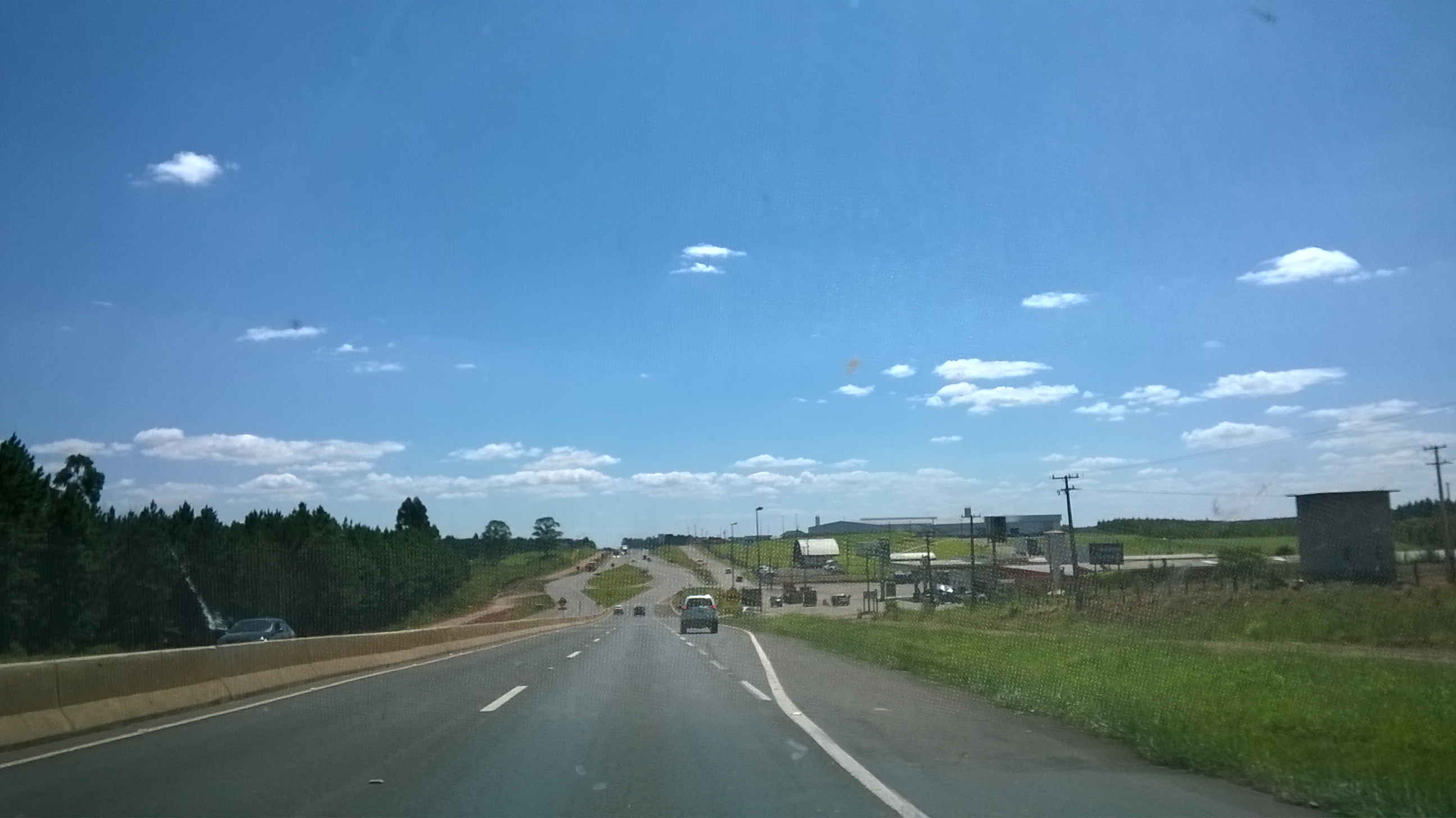
BR-277 in Guarapuava.

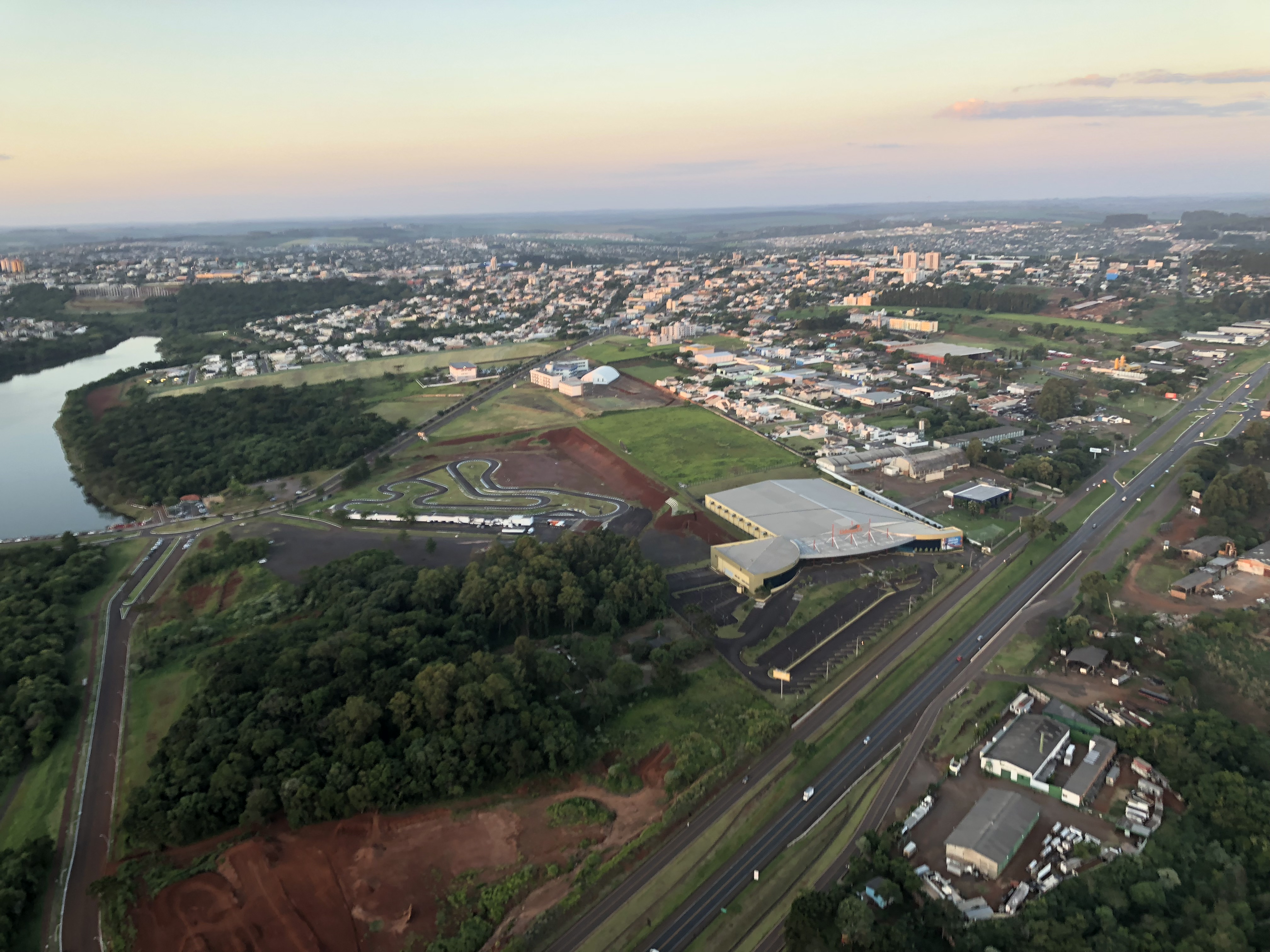
BR-277 in Cascavel.

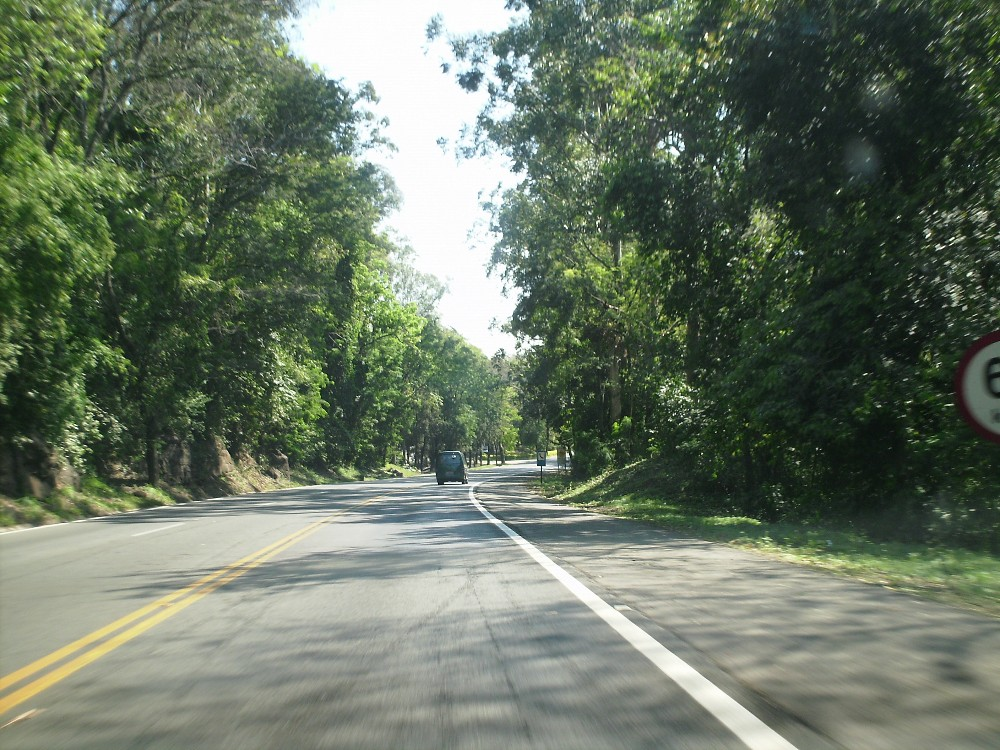
BR-277 in Matelândia.

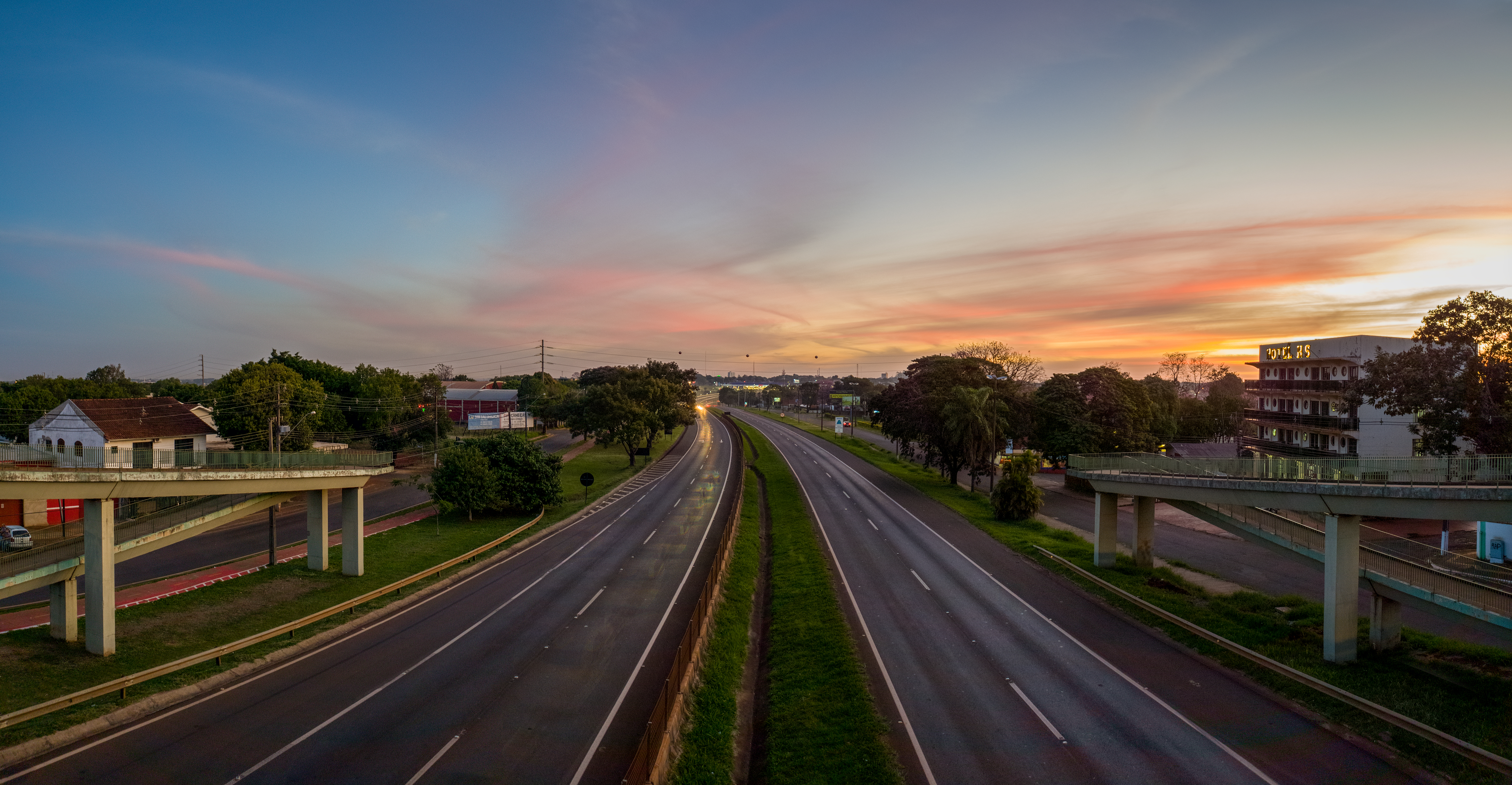
BR-277 in Foz do Iguaçu.
