= Guaraqueçaba Environmental Protection Area =

Protected area in the State of Paraná, Brazil

- Área de Proteção Ambiental de Guaraqueçaba
- IUCN category V (protected landscape/seascape)
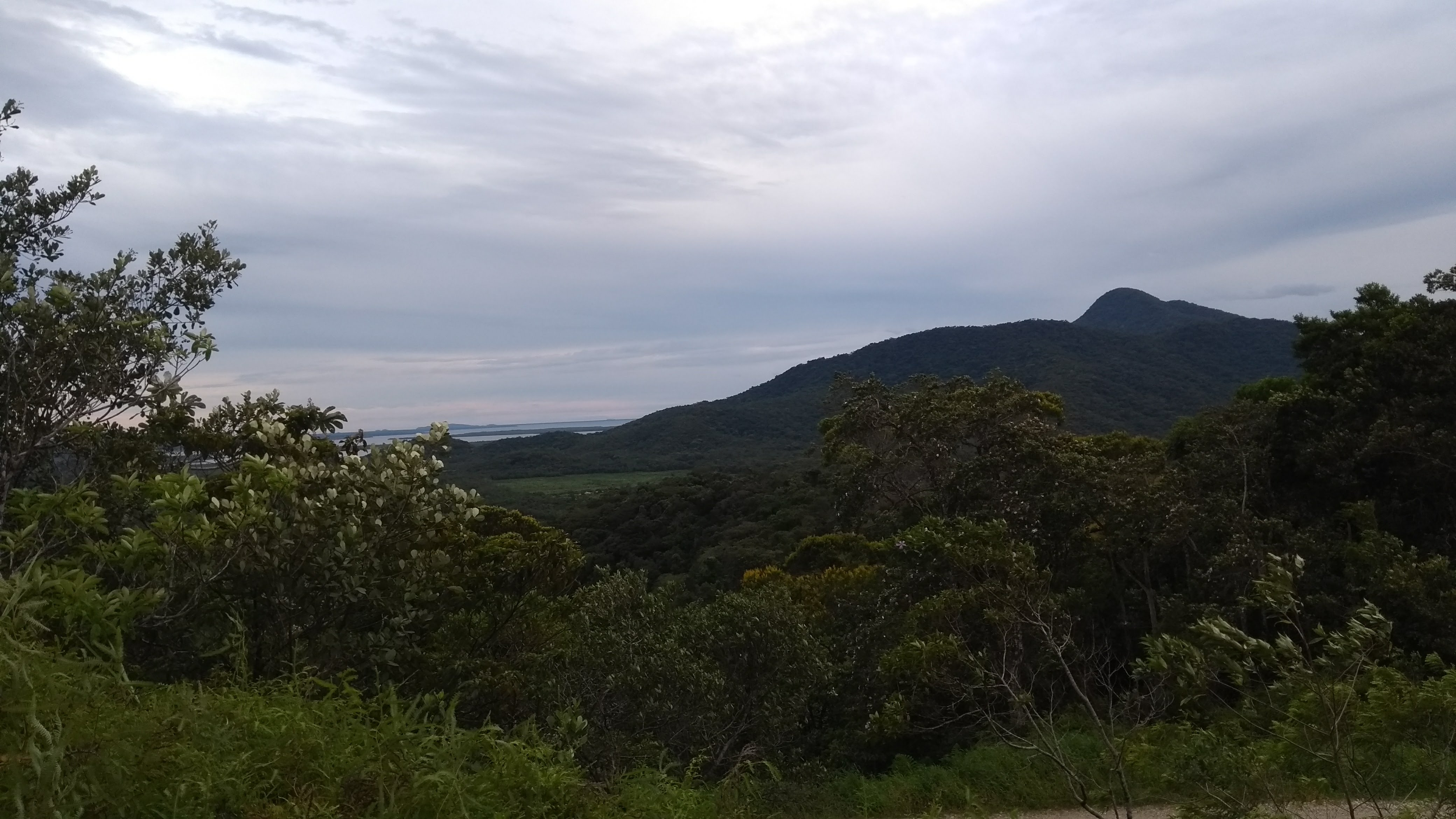
- The Atlantic forest in this protected area

- Location within Brazil
- Nearest city: Paranaguá, Paraná
- Coordinates: 25.2444°S 48.3836°W
- Area: 282,444 hectares (697,930 acres)
- Designation: Environmental Protection Area
- Created: 31 January 1985

Guaraqueçaba Environmental Protection Area (Portuguese: Área de Proteção Ambiental de Guaraqueçaba) is a protected area in the State of Paraná, Brazil. It includes Atlantic Forest, mangrove, salt marsh and estuarine environments in an area with a relatively low human population.

== Location ==
The protected area, which covers 282,444 hectares (697,930 acres) of coastal marine environment, was established on 31 January 1985. It is administered by the Chico Mendes Institute for Biodiversity Conservation. It covers parts of the municipalities of Antonina, Campina Grande do Sul, Guaraqueçaba and Paranaguá in the State of Paraná. It includes diverse environments of the Atlantic Forest biome including tropical rain forest, montane forest, mangrove and salt marsh. The climate is typical of the humid tropical zone with high rainfall, and average temperature of about 28 °C (82 °F). The area includes the Superagui National Park and the Guaraqueçaba Ecological Station. The coastal area is in the Iguape-Cananéia-Paranaguá estuary lagoon complex.

== Conservation ==
The area is classed as IUCN protected area category V, protected landscape/seascape. Objectives are to protect biological diversity, manage human impacts and ensure the sustainable use of natural resources. The area was created to protect one of the last representative areas of Atlantic Forest biome as well as the Paranaguá Bay estuarine complex and archaeological sites, to control the use of pesticides, to preserve the caiçaras communities that have become integrated into the regional ecosystem and to establish rational criteria for land use in the region. The conservation unit is part of the Lagamar mosaic.

Protected species include black-fronted piping guan (Pipile jacutinga), red-tailed amazon (Amazona brasiliensis), white-necked hawk (Buteogallus lacernulatus), black-headed berryeater (Carpornis melanocephala), purple-winged ground dove (Claravis geoffroyi), neon goby (Elacatinus figaro), Superagui lion tamarin (Leontopithecus caissara) and fasciated tiger heron (Tigrisoma fasciatum}.

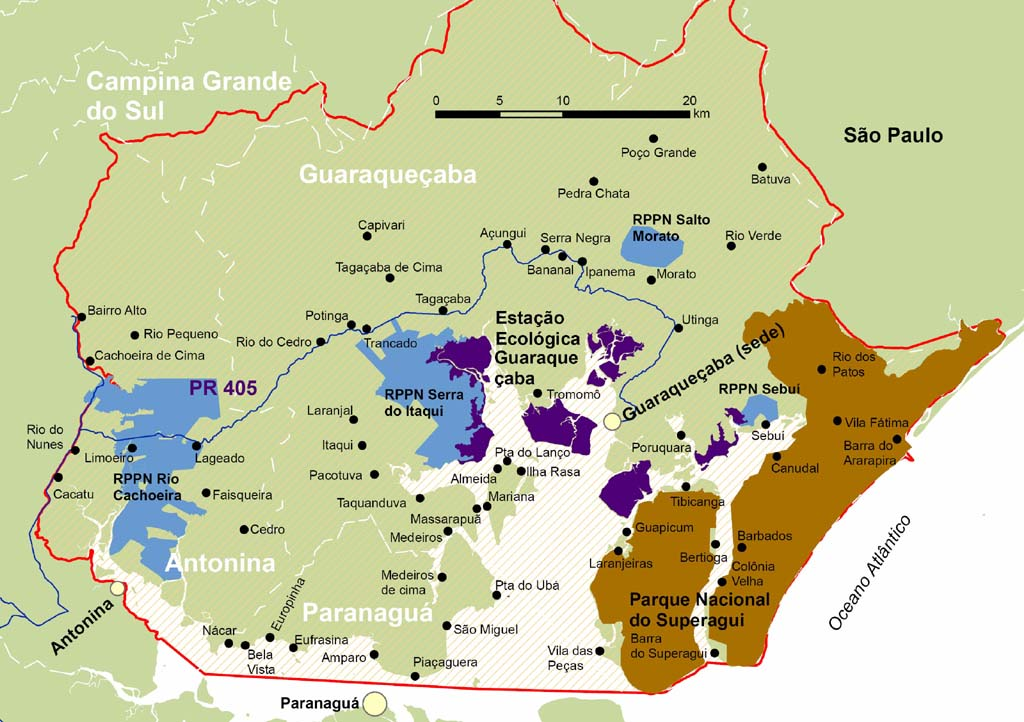
Guaraqueçaba Environmental Protection Area (Large red outline) and conservation units and communities it includes

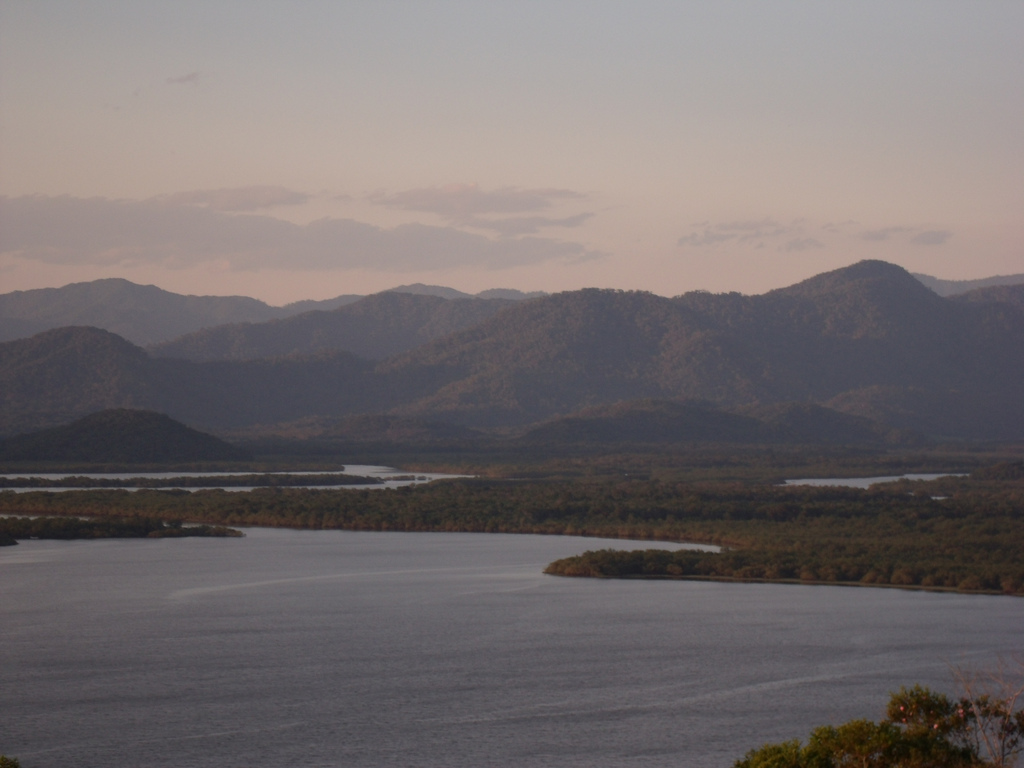
Estuary and mountains

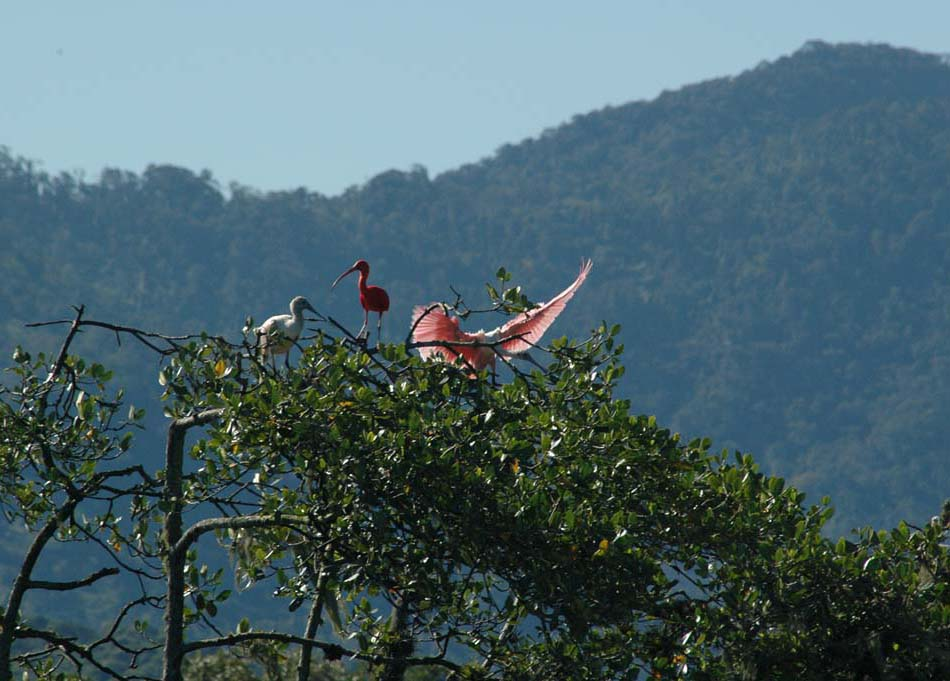
Guarás in the trees of the Guaraqueçaba Ecological station

== Sources ==
- APA de Guaraqueçaba (in Portuguese), Chico Mendes Institute for Biodiversity Conservation
- Unidade de Conservação: Área de Proteção Ambiental de Guaraqueçaba (in Portuguese), MMA: Ministério do Meio Ambiente
- Unidades de Conservação - Mosaico do Litoral Sul de São Paulo e do Litoral do Paraná - LAGAMAR (in Portuguese), ICMBio, archived from the original on 2019-05-27
