= Ilha Grande mangroves =

Mangrove forest region in Brazil

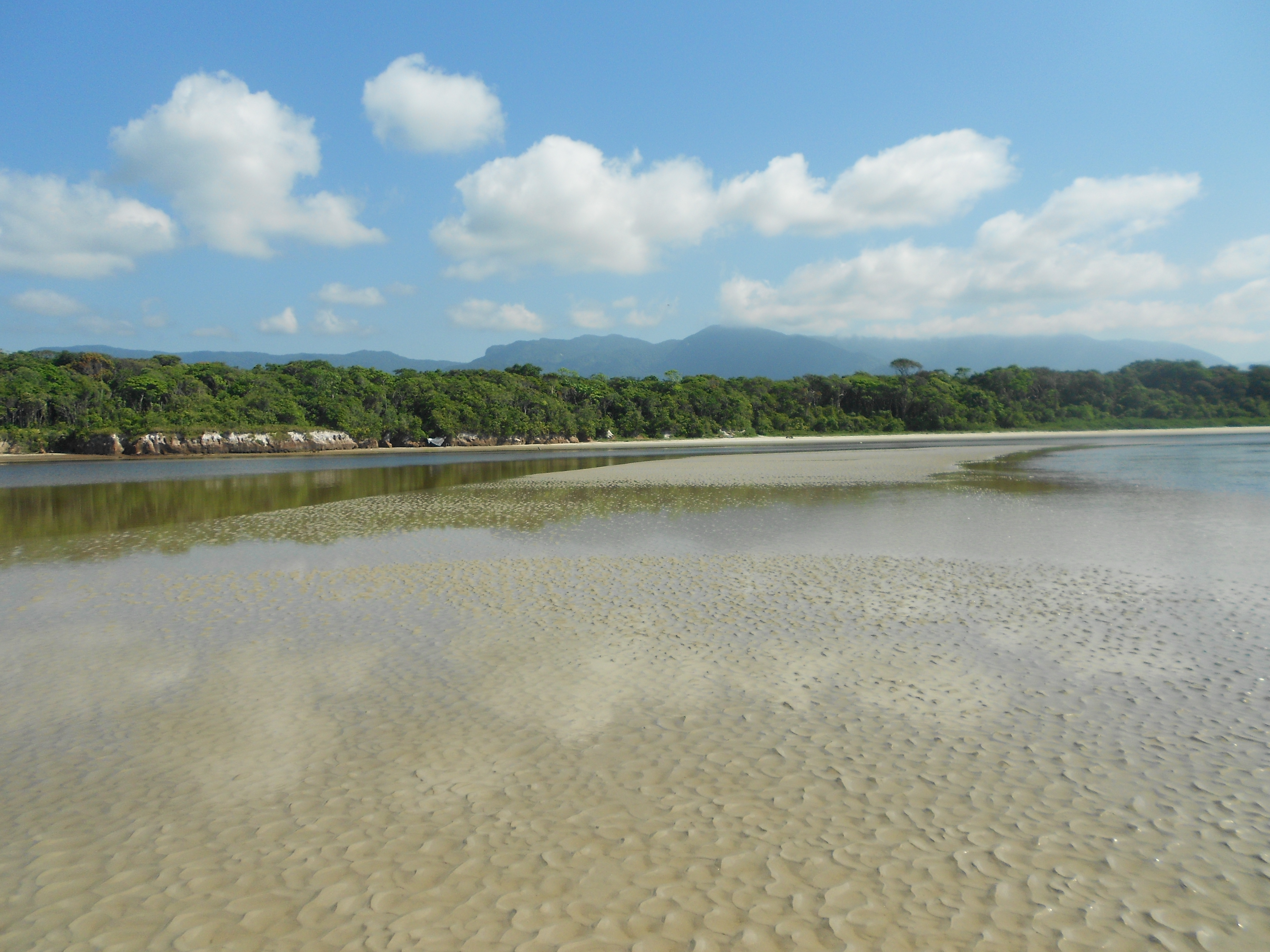
- Bertioga, Brazil

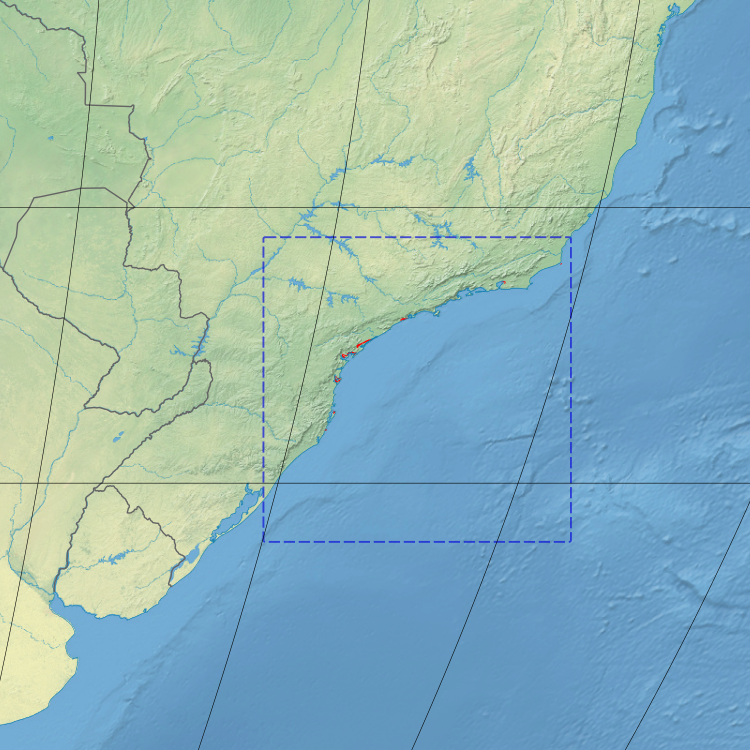
- Ecoregion territory (in purple)

Ecology
- Realm: Neotropic
- Biome: Mangroves

Geography
- Area: 3,108 km^{2} (1,200 sq mi)
- Country: Brazil
- Coordinates: 23.6°S 45.75°W

The Ilha Grande mangroves ecoregion (WWF ID: NT1415) covers a series of disconnected salt-water and brackish mangrove forests along the southeastern coast of Brazil on the South Atlantic Ocean. The ecoregion is defined as covering the mangroves found between the Paraíba do Sul River in the north to Florianópolis in the south. This coastal region is the most densely population region of Brazil, and many of the mangroves are in close proximity to ports and industrial cities. A number of ecological reserves have been established to protect the high biodiversity of the mangroves, recognizing their importance to migratory birds, and as nursery habitat for juvenile fish, crabs, shrimp, and mollusks.

== Location and description ==
The ecoregion's mangroves exist in isolated sites, generally at river deltas or around protected bays or lagoons. Significant sites include:

- Paraíba do Sul estuary. This river outlet is the northernmost site, at São João da Barra in Rio de Janeiro Province.
- Guanabara Bay. Around the north and eastern margins of the bay is a mangrove in the Guapimirim Environmental Protection Area. The west side of the bay is the major city of Rio de Janeiro.
- Ilha Grande and Paraty. Ilha Grande is relatively undeveloped, and with Paraty has been designated a UNESCO World Heritage Site. They are near the cities of Sepetiba and Angra dos Reis, built-up port cities situated on separate bays west of Rio de Janeiro.
- Santos, São Paulo. This port city of immediately south of the capital city of São Paulo is surrounded by a mangrove forest.
- Barra do Una Sustainable Development Reserve, is a small protected mangrove at the mouth of the Una do Prelado River.
- Ilha Comprida Environmental Protection Area, at the mouth of the Ribeira de Iguape River and along an estuarine lagoon. The site is a RAMSAR wetland of international importance.
- Superagüi National Park, protecting a series of islands around the Bay of Paranaguá
- Baía da Babitonga was the site of the proposed Baía da Babitonga Wildlife Reserve, a project that was dropped in 2006.
- Florianópolis, a major city on a bay surrounded by mangroves.

== Climate ==
The climate of the ecoregion is Humid continental climate, warm wet summer (Köppen climate classification (Cfa)). This climate is characterized by large seasonal temperature differentials. No month averages below 0 °C (32 °F), at least one month averages above 22 °C (72 °F), and four months average over 10 °C (50 °F). In this ecoregion, average annual temperatures range from 15 to 24 degrees C. Precipitation is relatively even throughout the year, and averages 1,500 - 2,500 mm/year.

== Flora and fauna ==
Characteristic tree species for the ecoregion's mangroves are Avicennia schaueriana, white mangrove (Laguncularia racemosa), and red mangrove (Rhizophora mangle).

The critically endangered Superagüi lion tamarin (Leontopithecus caissara) lives in the ecoregion, primarily in Superagui National Park.

== Protected areas ==
Officially protected areas in the ecoregion include:

- Guapimirim Environmental Protection Area, on Guanabara Bay in the state of Rio de Janeiro
- Mananciais do Rio Paraíba do Sul Environmental Protection Area, on the bay guarded by Ilha Grande.
- Barra do Una Sustainable Development Reserve
- Ilha Comprida Environmental Protection Area
- Superagüi National Park
- Bom Jesus Biological Reserve
