= Serra do Mar coastal forests =

Ecoregion in Brazil

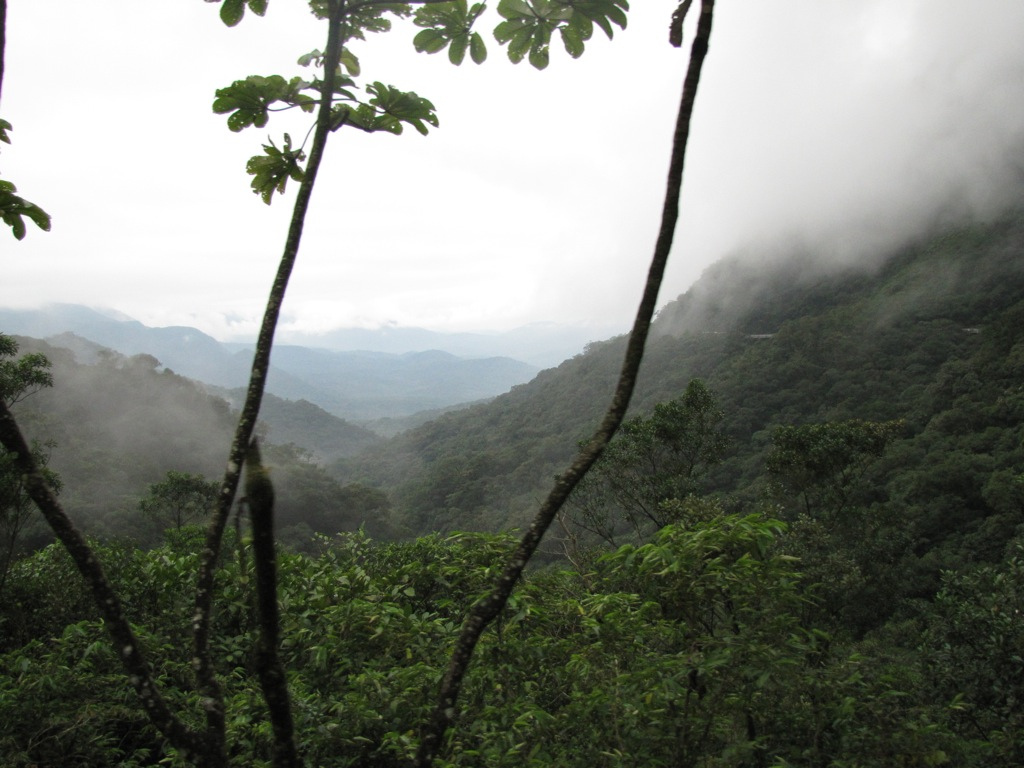
- Forest in Serra do Mar, Paraná, Brazil.

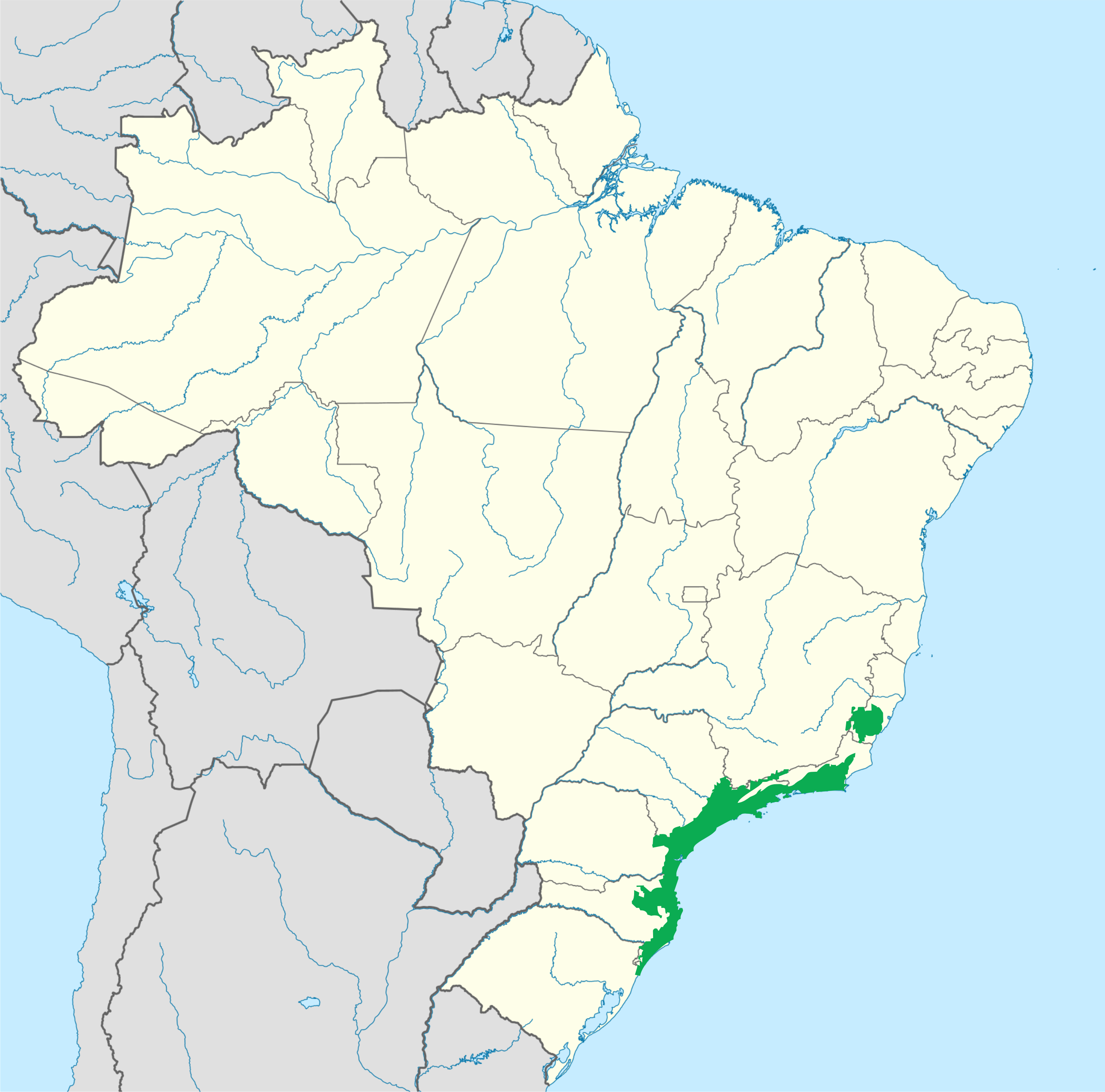
- Serra do Mar coastal forests localization as delineated by WWF.

Ecology
- Realm: Neotropical
- Biome: Tropical and subtropical moist broadleaf forests
- Borders: List: Alto Paraná Atlantic forests; Araucaria moist forests; Atlantic Ocean; Bahia coastal forests; Cerrado
- Bird species: 628
- Mammal species: 175

Geography
- Area: 104,800 km^{2} (40,500 mi^{2})
- Country: Brazil
- States: São Paulo; Rio de Janeiro; Paraná; Minas Gerais; Espírito Santo; Santa Catarina; Rio Grande do Sul

Conservation
- Habitat loss: 70.0%
- Protected: 36.2%

The Serra do Mar coastal forests is an ecoregion of the tropical moist forests biome. It is part of the Atlantic Forest of eastern South America. This ecoregion has an outstanding biodiversity consisting of flora, mammals, birds, and herpetofauna.

== Geography ==
The Serra do Mar mountain range defines this ecoregion. The Serra do Mar coastal forests extend from the Atlantic coast up the seaward-facing slopes of the Serra do Mar, along the southern coast of Brazil for about 1,000 kilometres (620 mi).

The ecoregion lies within the states of São Paulo, Rio de Janeiro, Paraná, Minas Gerais, Espírito Santo, Santa Catarina, and Rio Grande do Sul.

== Climate ==
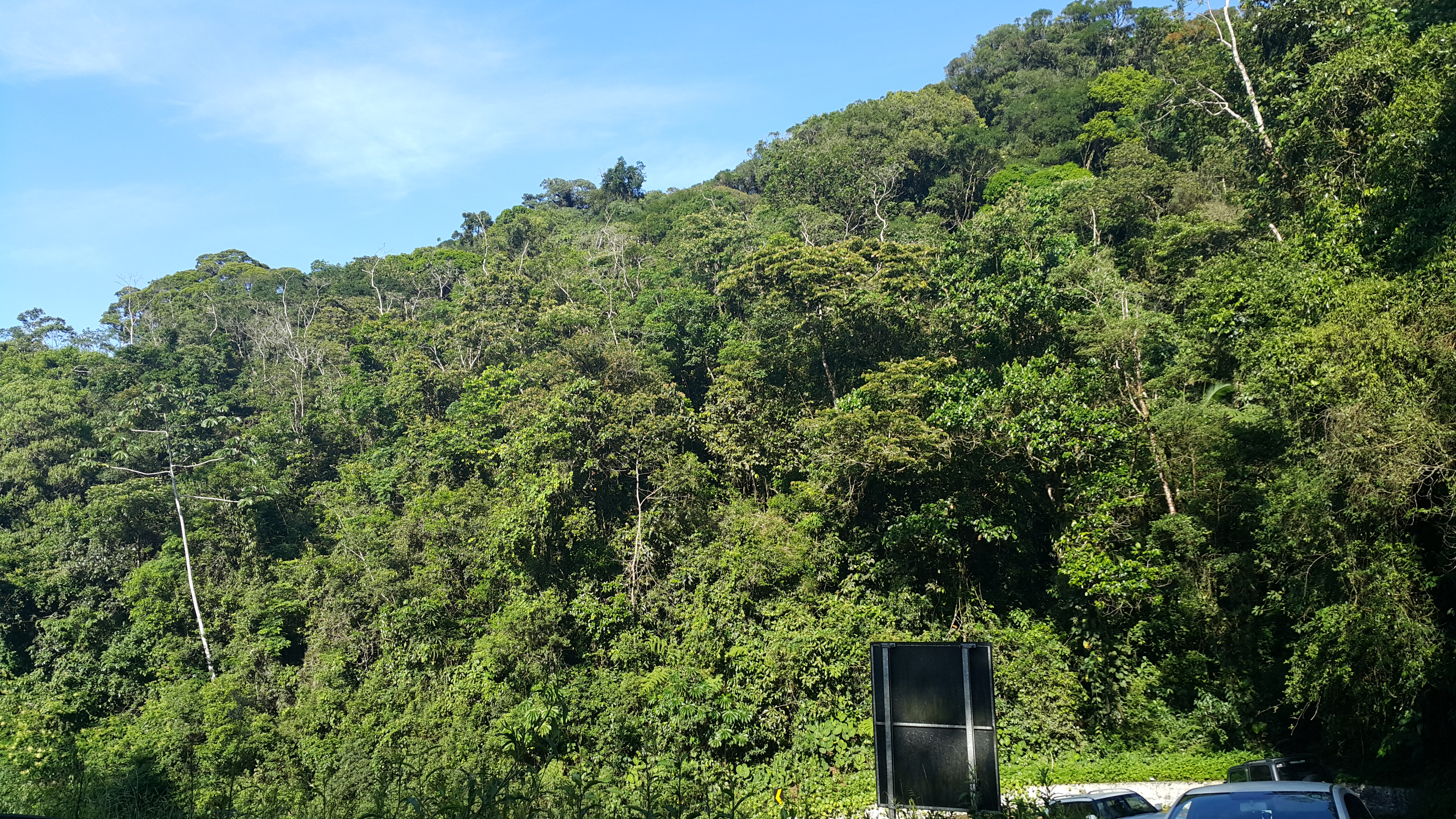
The forest in Serra do Mar State Park, seen next to the Oswaldo Cruz highway, in Ubatuba.

The climate is subtropical with high levels of annual rainfall. Annual rainfall ranges from 1,400 to 4,000 millimeters without a dry season.

== Flora ==
The plant communities in the ecoregion include coastal scrub, lowland rain forests, and montane rain forests.

The lowland rain forests are composed of four strata, including a dense canopy layer and emergent trees which grow up to 30 meters high. Common canopy and emergent trees include species from the plant families Leguminosae (Copaifera trapezifolia), Sapotaceae (species of Pouteria and Chrysophyllum), and Lauraceae.

Tropical montane cloud forests occur from 1,200 to 1,500 meters elevation in the northern portion of the ecoregion, and 700 to 1100 meters in the south. They are found on seaward-facing mountain slopes with high rainfall and frequent year-round cloud cover.

Tropical montane cloud forests are dense forests, characterized by small trees and shrubs and abundant and diverse epiphytes. Species of Myrtaceae are the predominant canopy trees, including Siphoneugena reitzii, Myrceugenia euosma, Myrceugenia bracteosa, other Myrceugenia species, Myrcia hartwegiana, and Myrcia palustris. Canopy trees typically have tortuous trunks, rigid branches, rounded crowns, and small glossy (glabrous) or coriaceous leaves. Drimys brasiliensis and species of Lauraceae and Melastomataceae are also common, and Mimosa scabrella, Clethra scabra, Tibouchina sellowiana, Lamanonia sp., Ilex taubertiana, and Ilex microdonta are less common.

Epiphytes are diverse and abundant in the cloud forests, and include bromeliads, orchids, ferns, mosses, liverworts, and lichens.

== Fauna ==
Native animals include the puma (Puma concolor), crab-eating fox (Cerdocyon thous), coati (Nasua nasua), skunk (Conepatus chinga), tapir (Tapirus terrestris), brocket deer (Mazama sp.), armadillo (Dasypus sp.), agouti (Dasyprocta sp.), harpy eagle (Harpia harpyja), and tinamous (Tinamus sp.).

The southern muriqui (Brachyteles arachnoides) and golden lion tamarin (Leontopithecus rosalia) are primates endemic to the ecoregion. Both are endangered. The Brazilian slender opossum (Marmosops paulensis) is endemic to the ecoregion's montane forests.

Rare and limited-range birds native to the ecoregion include the blue-bellied parrot (Triclaria malachitacea), white-bearded antshrike (Biatas nigropectus), plumbeous antvireo (Dysithamnus plumbeus), Rio de Janeiro antwren (Myrmotherula fluminensis), gray-winged cotinga (Lipaugus conditus), kinglet calyptura (Calyptura cristata), Kaempfer's tody-tyrant (Hemitriccus kaempferi), and cherry-throated tanager (Nemosia rourei).

Rare and limited-range amphibians include the frogs Ololygon jureia and Cycloramphus carvalhoi.

== Conservation ==
70% of the original forest has already been altered by settlement and agriculture.

The primary ongoing threats to this ecoregion are urban development and tourism infrastructure.

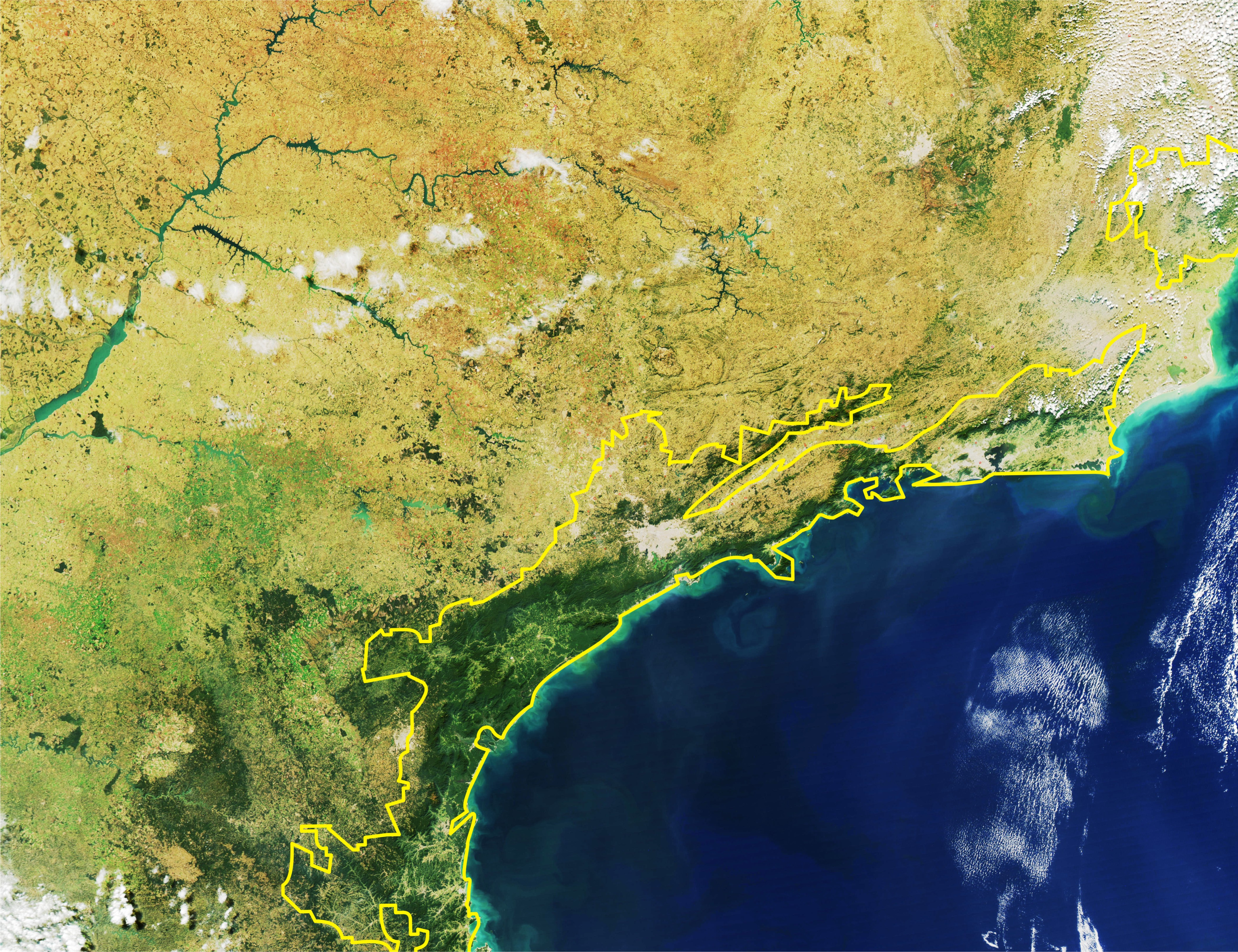
Satellite picture of Serra do Mar coastal forests ecoregion (within yellow line). The deforestation (tan areas) of the ecoregion is visible.

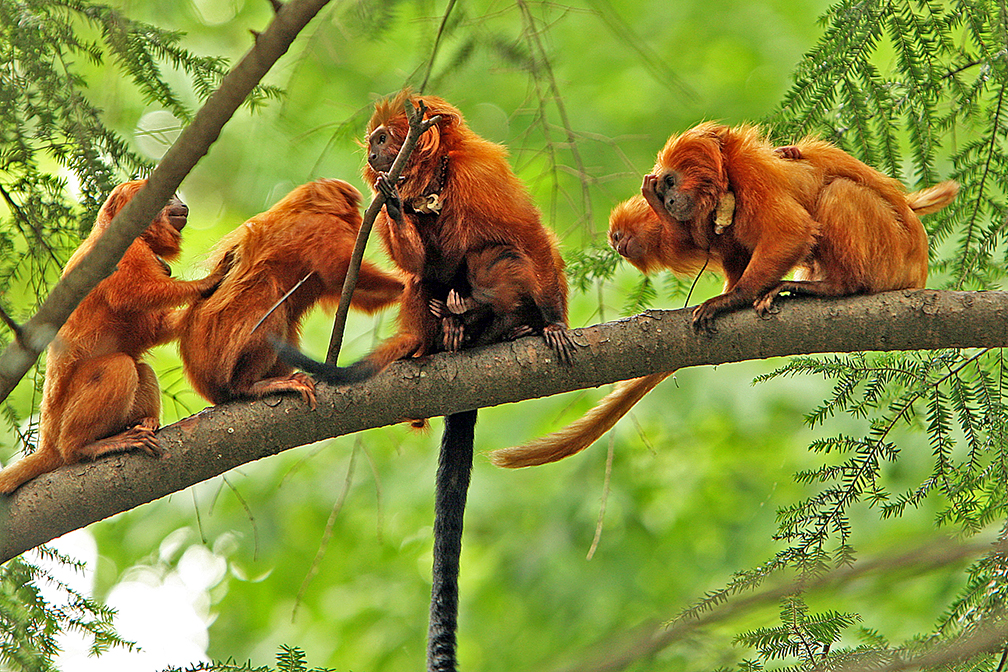
Golden lion tamarin, an endemic species of the Serra do Mar coastal forests, in Rio de Janeiro.

36.2% of the ecoregion is in protected areas. Protected areas include Guaricana National Park, Itatiaia National Park, Saint-Hilaire/Lange National Park, São Joaquim National Park, Serra dos Órgãos National Park, Serra da Bocaina National Park, Serra do Itajaí National Park, Superagui National Park, Tijuca National Park, Araras Biological Reserve, Bom Jesus Biological Reserve, Parque Equitativa Biological Reserve, Poço das Antas Biological Reserve, Serra Geral Biological Reserve, Tamboré Biological Reserve, Tinguá Biological Reserve, União Biological Reserve, Bananal Ecological Station, Carijós Ecological Station, Chaúas Ecological Station, Guaraguaçu Ecological Station, Guanabara Ecological Station, Ilha do Mel Ecological Station, Itapeti Ecological Station, Juréia-Itatins Ecological Station, Monte das Flores Ecological Station, Tamoios Ecological Station, and Tupiniquins Ecological Station.

== See also ==
- Ecoregions in the Atlantic Forest biome
- List of ecoregions in Brazil
