= Sebuí Private Natural Heritage Reserve =

Private natural heritage reserve in Brazil

- RPPN Reserva Ecológica Sebuí
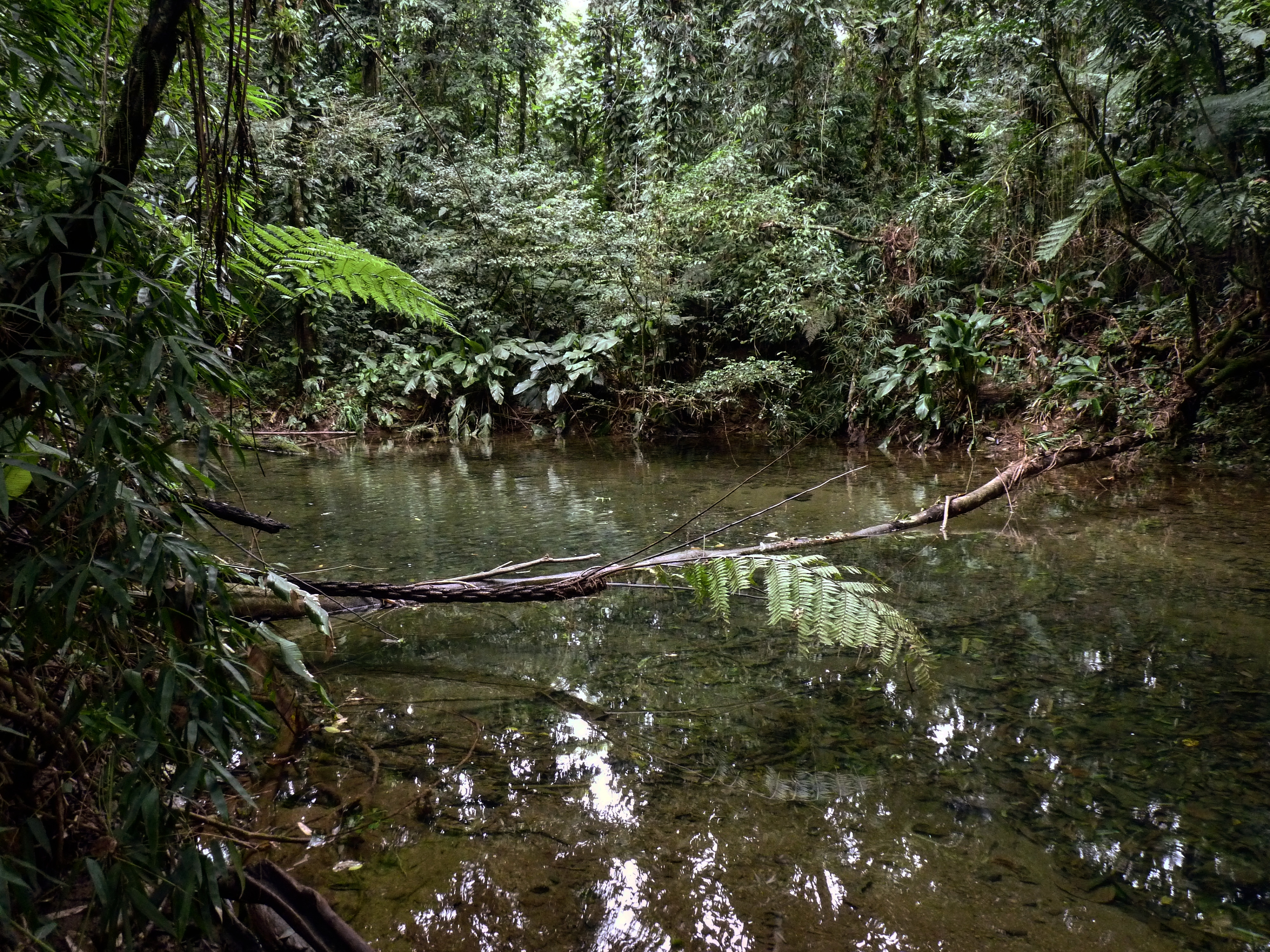
- Body of water at the reserve

- Location within Brazil
- Nearest city: Guaraqueçaba, Paraná
- Coordinates: 25°16′25″S 48°13′11″W
- Area: 400.78 hectares (990.3 acres)
- Designation: Private natural heritage reserve
- Created: 25 November 1999
- Administrator: (privately operated)

The Sebuí Private Natural Heritage Reserve (Portuguese: Reserva Particular do Patrimônio Natural (RPPN) Reserva Ecológica Sebuí) is a private natural heritage reserve in the state of Paraná, Brazil.

== Location ==
The Sebuí Private Natural Heritage Reserve is in the municipality of Guaraqueçaba, Paraná. It has an area of 400.78 hectares (990.3 acres) out of a total property area of 500 hectares (1,200 acres). The reserve is on the coast of Paraná, accessible only by boat. The journey takes 50 minutes from the town of Guaraqueçaba, and the reserve may also be reached from Paranaguá. The reserve is in one of the largest estuaries of the South Atlantic, containing about 60 islands. It houses traditional communities with a rich culture.

The Sebuí Private Natural Heritage Reserve was created by ordnance on 25 November 1999, modified on 3 February 2000. The name "Sebuí" comes from the Guarani language word for "earthworm", referring to the creatures that live there and to the sinuosity of one of the rivers. The reserve is part of the Lagamar Mosaic:

== Environment ==
The reserve protects an area of Atlantic Forest. More than 70% of the forest is in its primary state, and has never been affected by human activity. 91 species of birds have been seen, about 20 of amphibians, 15 of fish, 10 of reptiles and several of mammals. The reserve is home to vulnerable red-tailed amazon (Amazona brasiliensis).

== Activities ==
The Sebuí Private Natural Heritage Reserve is run commercially, providing tourist packages that include an interpretative forest trail, waterfall and kayaks. Visitors may bathe in the rivers or falls. Walks lead along the mangroves and the banks of the Velho, Sebuí and Quatro Quedas rivers. The night trail is over 4 kilometres (2.5 mi) long and takes about two hours to cover. Trips may be arranged from the reserve to the Superagüi National Park, to see the parrots on the Ilha dos Pinheiros, and to Maruja Beach in the state of São Paulo.

== Sources ==
- "Guaraqueçaba: RPPN Reserva Ecológica Sebuí", Nosso Litoral do Paraná (in Portuguese)
- "Reserva Ecológica do Sebuí", Cia Eco (in Portuguese)
- "Reserva Ecológica do Sebuí (RPPN)", newsguara (in Portuguese)
- "Reserva do Sebuí é roteiro turístico no litoral parananense", G1 Globo (in Portuguese), 11 June 2011
- RPPN Reserva Ecológica Sebuí (in Portuguese), Chico Mendes Institute for Biodiversity Conservation (ICMBio)
- Sebuí, Reserva Particular do Patrimônio Natural, RPPN Sebuí (in Portuguese), Aventuras Produções
- Unidades de Conservação - Mosaico do Litoral Sul de São Paulo e do Litoral do Paraná - LAGAMAR (in Portuguese), ICMBio, archived from the original on 2019-05-27
