= Peças Island =

Island of Brazil

Coordinates: 25°25′S 48°18′W

Peças Island (Brazilian Portuguese: Ilha das Peças) is an island in the Paranaguá Bay in the Brazilian state of Parana. There are about 350 inhabitants. The island is part of the municipality of Guaraqueçaba, and forms part of the Superagüi National Park. It is not far from Ilha do Mel.

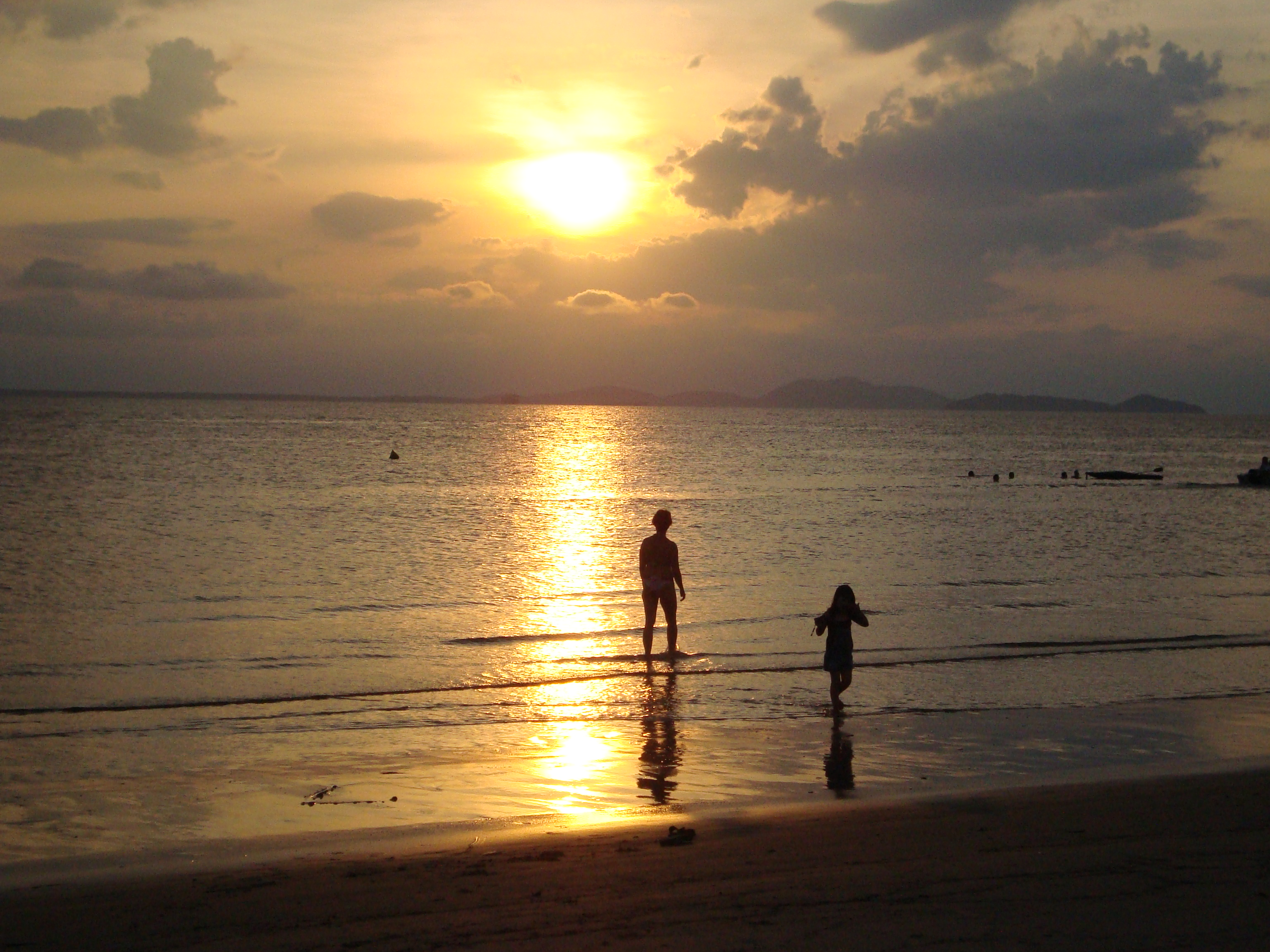
Sunset from Ilha das Peças

== History ==
The first inhabitants of the area were the Tupiniquim people. During the Golden Age of Piracy, Europeans arrived: French sailors landed on Superagüi to hide from potential ambushers.

There are several theories about the origin of the name of the island (Peças means pieces in Portuguese). It may derive from the fact that the island was a hideout where many stolen treasures ("pieces") were hidden by pirates in the area. Another story goes that the name is associated with the slave trade in Brazil. Slaves were trafficked from the north of the country to work in the south, but since the slave trade was officially illegal, ships were not allowed to arrive in Paranaguá with the "load" of slaves visible, and so the "pieces", as the slaves were derogatorily referred to in the time, were left on islands near the entrance to the Paranaguá Bay. The islands were strategic locations for traders, since they were relatively close to the city (today known as Curitiba), and the terrain permitted the hiding of slaves until the slavers completed negotiations in Paranguá. Neither of these explanations has been proven to be true.

== Businesses ==
The island has electricity and treated piped water. There are public elementary and middle schools, and adult education programs. There are various commercial establishments, guesthouseses, six restaurants, a Catholic church, a Baptist church, an Assembly of God, a clinic, a soccer field, and two women's organizations, which host kitchens and community restaurants, a residents’ association and an association of ecotourism guides.

One of the most traditional celebrations on the coast of Paraná is the Festa de São Sebastian (Festival of Saint Sebastian) on Peças Island. The religious ceremonies are attended by thousands of visitors in the summer, who participate in both religious and cultural activities.

== Economy ==
Fishing and oyster harvesting are the two principle economic activities on the island. Access to the island is only through boats departing from Paranaguá, Guaraqueçaba, and other islands in the area, with the average travel time requiring about 1:30. Tourist activities include biking trails, boat tours, river dolphin watching, and bike rides along the waterfront.

The region is considered a nursery for Guiana dolphins. It is common to see them swimming along the shores of the island.
