= O Boticário =

Brazilian cosmetics company

- Type: Private
- Industry: Cosmetics
- Founded: 1977; 49 years ago
- Headquarters: São José dos Pinhais, Paraná, Brazil
- Key people: Artur Grynbaum (Chairman)
- Products: Beauty & wellness
- Revenue: ▲US$ 3.7 billion (2019)
- Number of employees: 12,000
- Parent: Grupo Boticário
- Website: www.boticario.com

O Boticário (Portuguese pronunciation: [o botʃiˈkaɾju]) is a Brazilian cosmetics company. It has 4,070 stores in Brazil, Portugal, Mexico, Guyana, Bolivia, Peru, United States, Paraguay, Japan, France, Angola, Colombia, Venezuela and the United Arab Emirates.

== History ==
O Boticário was created in 1977 as a small prescription drugstore in the city of Curitiba, capital of the state of Paraná, in southern Brazil. Today the company is the world's largest perfumery and cosmetics franchising network.

O Boticário's industrial and administrative complex has 34.4 thousand square meters of floor space in the city of São José dos Pinhais in the Curitiba Metropolitan Area. It employs 1,300 people and creates approximately 10 thousand jobs through its franchising network. O Boticário's first manufacturing plant was inaugurated in 1982, with just 1 thousand square meters of floor space. Then it employed 27 people who worked to manufacture about 400 thousand items a year. O Boticário's current production exceeds 59 million units.

== Fundação O Boticário ==
In 1990, the company created the Fundação O Boticário de Proteção à Natureza (O Boticário Nature Protection Foundation), a nonprofit organization that has already sponsored 800 conservationist projects including studies, scientific research, environmental education programs and direct fauna and flora protection actions all over Brazil. The Foundation also supports the "Natural Areas Protection Program", which aims at implementing its own network of private natural heritage reserves.

The first one is the Salto Morato Private Natural Heritage Reserve, which occupies a 2,340-hectare area, in Guaraqueçaba, on the north coast of the state of Paraná, in southern Brazil. This reservation protects a significant area of the Atlantic Rainforest, besides being provided with infrastructure for scientific research, environmental education, and outdoor recreation. In November 1999, the reservation supported by Fundação O Boticário de Proteção à Natureza was declared a Natural Heritage Site by UNESCO.

== Products ==
O Boticário's product lines consist of approximately 480 items, divided into the following categories: body care, facial care, sun care, makeup, deodorizing colognes, deodorants, soaps and shampoos.

Amazonian plants such as açaí, cupuaçu, carnaúba, guaraná, cashew, and passion flower; gums extracted from algae and vegetal extracts, such as arnica and urucum, are among the active ingredients present in the brand's products.

== Collaborations ==
O Boticário joined an exclusive partnership with Netflix in November 2022 with the launch of cosmetics products inspired by the series Money Heist, Stranger Things and Sex Education.

== Controversy ==
In May 2015, the company launched in Brazil a campaign titled "Toda Forma de Amor" (Every Kind of Love), made for Brazilian Valentine's Day (celebrated annually as Dia dos Namorados on 12 June, the day before the Saint Anthony of Padua festivities), the campaign presented heterosexual and homosexual couples embracing and exchanging gifts of the brand. The video generated huge repercussion, mainly in social networks. The commercial, uploaded on YouTube, earned more than three million views and had more than 360,000 likes, against over 180,000 dislikes (until 6 June 2015).

Among conservative sectors of society, however, the campaign had negative repercussions. There have been calls for boycotting the brand by people like pastor Silas Malafaia and homophobic statements in social networks. The National Council for Self-Regulatory Advertising (Conar) has also received inunerous complaints and initiated a process to verify possible abuses against the consumer in the advertising campaign of the company. On 16 July, however, Conar decided to file a lawsuit against the video. The rapporteur of the process emphasized in his vote: "Don't count on publicity to omit the reality."

Boticário replied that "the proposal of the 'Couples' campaign, which was first broadcast on 24 May, is to address, with respect and sensitivity, the current resonance about the most different forms of love regardless of age, race, gender or sexual orientation—represented by the pleasure of giving the person you love a gift on Valentine's Day." In an article published on the UOL Economia website, journalist James Cimino also pointed to inconsistencies in the brand's boycott movement as large multinationals—such as Apple, Microsoft, Google, HP, Intel, Facebook, The Coca-Cola Company, Colgate-Palmolive, Disney, Twitter, Visa, MasterCard, Starbucks, Nike, Xerox, Levi's, Gillette, Absolut, Amazon.com, Ray-Ban, Gap, American Airlines, Tiffany & Co., Budweiser and others—also support the LGBT movement, but were not threatened with boycott claims.
