= Campina do Encantado State Park =

State park in São Paulo, Brazil

- Parque Estadual da Campina do Encantado
- IUCN category II (national park)
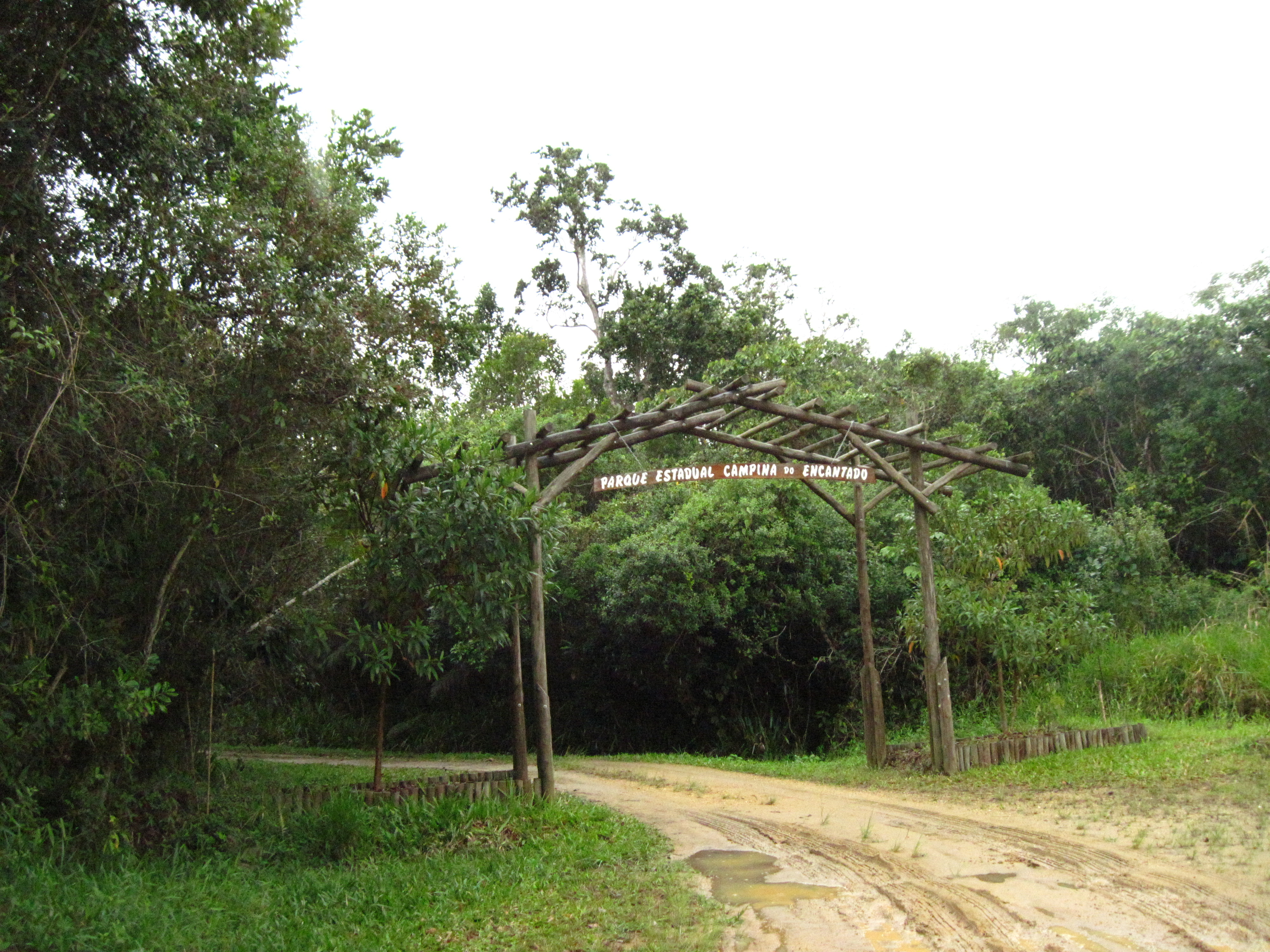
- Park entrance

- Location within Brazil
- Nearest city: Pariquera-Açu, São Paulo
- Coordinates: 24.641541°S 47.775677°W
- Area: 3,200 hectares (7,900 acres)
- Designation: State park
- Created: 16 August 1994

The Campina do Encantado State Park (Portuguese: Parque Estadual da Campina do Encantado) is a state park in the state of São Paulo, Brazil.

== Location ==
The Campina do Encantado State Park is in the municipality of Pariquera-Açu, São Paulo. It has an area of 3,200 hectares (7,900 acres). The park is in the lower Ribeira de Iguape River valley, between the Pariquera-Açu and Pariquera-Mirim rivers. There are no residents, although there is considerable pressure from the surrounding communities. The main focus of the park is on environmental education. The park has a visitor center with an audiovisual room, lodgings for researchers and technicians, a kiosk with a barbecue, a tank of native fish, a nursery of native plants and a computerized weather station.

== History ==
Privately owned land within the present park boundaries was occupied decades ago, but since then the vegetation has completely regenerated. The Pariquera Abaixo State Park was created by state law 8.873 of 16 August 1994, with an area of 2,359.50 hectares (5,830.5 acres). After further studies, the area was revised to 3,200 hectares (7,900 acres). At the request of the consultative council, the park was renamed the Campina do Encantado State Park on 26 May 1999. The management plan was prepared by the São Paulo State Foundation for Forest Conservation and Production (Fundação para a Conservação e a Produção Florestal do Estado de São Paulo). It was approved on 21 October 2009. The park is part of the Lagamar mosaic of conservation units.

== Archaeology ==
There are several archaeological sites, middens containing fragments of shells, bones and other objects. Two of them are 10 metres (33 ft) in diameter and 5 metres (16 ft) high. The shell mounds are between 5,870 and 4,974 years old. At present they are 19 to 25 kilometres (12 to 16 mi) from the sea shore, and 7 to 8 metres (23 to 26 ft) above sea level. The sea was higher when the mounds were formed, and there was an extensive network of lagoons in the area that reached its maximum extent about 5,100 year ago.

== Environment ==
The environment has been preserved because 50% is subject to periodic flooding and 25% is permanently flooded, cutting off access to the 25% that is higher arable land. The park holds a peat bog over 6 metres (20 ft) thick. The name "Campina do Encantado" (Enchanted Field) is due to the peat generating methane gas which can burn with a flame shooting from the ground up to 80 centimetres (31 in) high. Vegetation is dominated by restinga forest, swamp forest and várzea forest. The flora is rich in Bromeliaceaes and Araceaes. The park has diverse fauna, including the endangered red-tailed amazon (Amazona brasiliensis).

== Sources ==
- Parque Estadual da Campina do Encantado (in Portuguese), SAP: Sistems Ambiental Paulista, archived from the original on 2017-08-22
- "Plano de Manejo do Parque Estadual Campina do Encantado é aprovado", Blog do Instituto Geológico de São Paulo (in Portuguese), 28 October 2009
- Sobre o Parque (in Portuguese), SAP: Sistems Ambiental Paulista, archived from the original on 2017-08-22
- Unidades de Conservação - Mosaico do Litoral Sul de São Paulo e do Litoral do Paraná - LAGAMAR (in Portuguese), ICMBio, archived from the original on 2019-05-27
