= Guaraqueçaba Ecological Station =

Protected area in Paraná, Brazil

- Estação Ecológica de Guaraqueçaba
- IUCN category Ia (strict nature reserve)
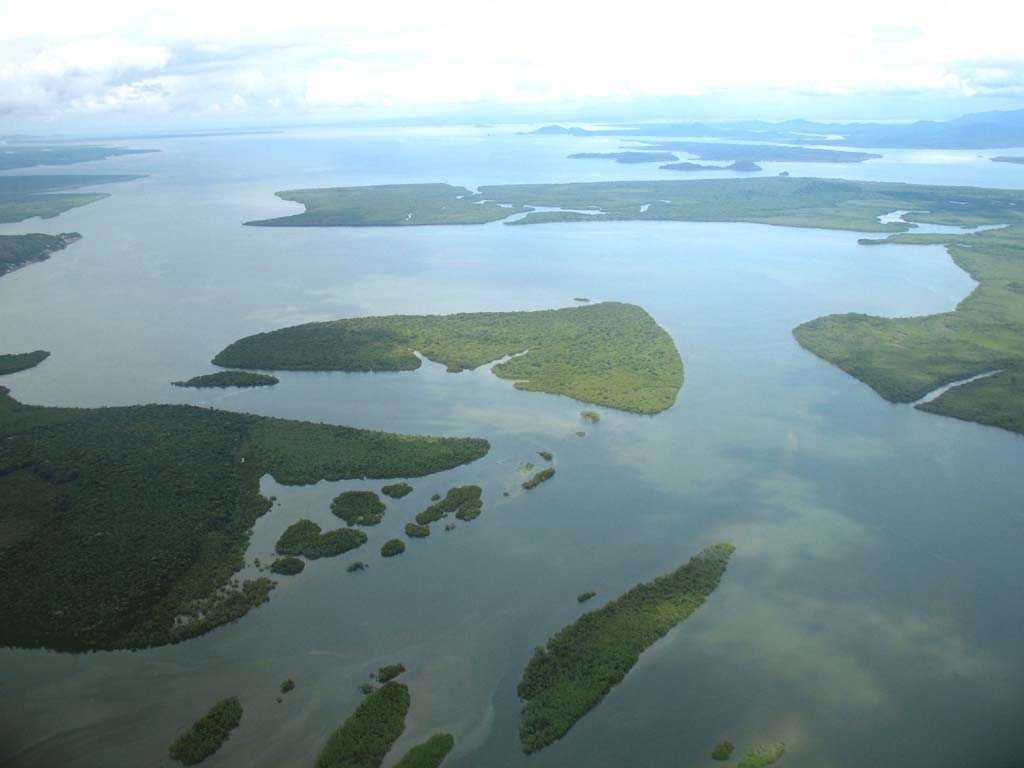
- Ilha do Sambaqui, Baía de Guaraqueçaba.

- Location within Brazil
- Nearest city: Paranaguá, Paraná
- Coordinates: 25.244°S 48.384°W
- Area: 4,476 hectares (11,060 acres)
- Designation: Ecological station
- Created: 31 May 1982

Ramsar Wetland
- Designated: 5 June 2017
- Reference no.: 2305

Guaraqueçaba Ecological Station (Portuguese: Estação Ecológica de Guaraqueçaba) is an ecological station in the municipality of Guaraqueçaba, Paraná, Brazil.

== Location ==
The Guaraqueçaba ecological station with an area of 4,476 hectares (11,060 acres) was established on 31 May 1982. It is in the coastal marine biome. It is administered by the Chico Mendes Institute for Biodiversity Conservation. It lies within the Guaraqueçaba municipality of the state of Paraná. The ecological reserve is fully contained in the Guaraqueçaba Environmental Protection Area (Área de Proteção Ambiental de Guaraqueçaba). It is part of the Lagamar mosaic.

== Environment ==
The region is a flat area of unconsolidated sediment of continental and marine origins. The highest point is 30 metres (98 ft) above sea level. The conservation unit is in the Benito creek at the confluence of the mouths of the Tagaçaba and Serra Negra rivers, the Itaqui creek at the confluence of the mouths of the Pacotuva and Boquaçu rivers, and in the mouths of the Guaraqueçaba, Poruquara, Birigui and Sabuí rivers. There are numerous channels and black water pools between these estuaries. The unit covers areas of mangroves to the west of the Baía dos Pinheiros, to the north of the Baía de Guaraqueçaba and to the west of the Enseada do Benito, as well as the islands of Laranjeiras, Rabelo, Pavoçá, Sambaqui, Bananas and Galheta.

The station lies in the humid tropical zone with high rainfall, particularly from February to April. Average rainfall is 2,365 millimetres (93.1 in). Temperatures range from 17 to 26 °C (63 to 79 °F) with an average of 21 °C (70 °F). The vegetation is Atlantic rain forest, transitional forests and mangroves. The Rhizophora mangle, Laguncularia racemosa and Avicennia schaueriana are the main trees of the mangrove, and flower from March to October. They are arranging into clearly defined zones, with the Rhizophora mangle closest to the river margin. In addition to fish and birds, there are many species of crustaceans, molluscs and other invertebrates in the mangroves.

== Conservation ==
The Ecological Station is a "strict nature reserve" under IUCN protected area category Ia. The station was created to preserve the mangrove and island ecosystem, protect endangered species, maintain gene banks and support scientific research. The Red-tailed amazon (Amazona brasiliensis) is a protected species in the station.

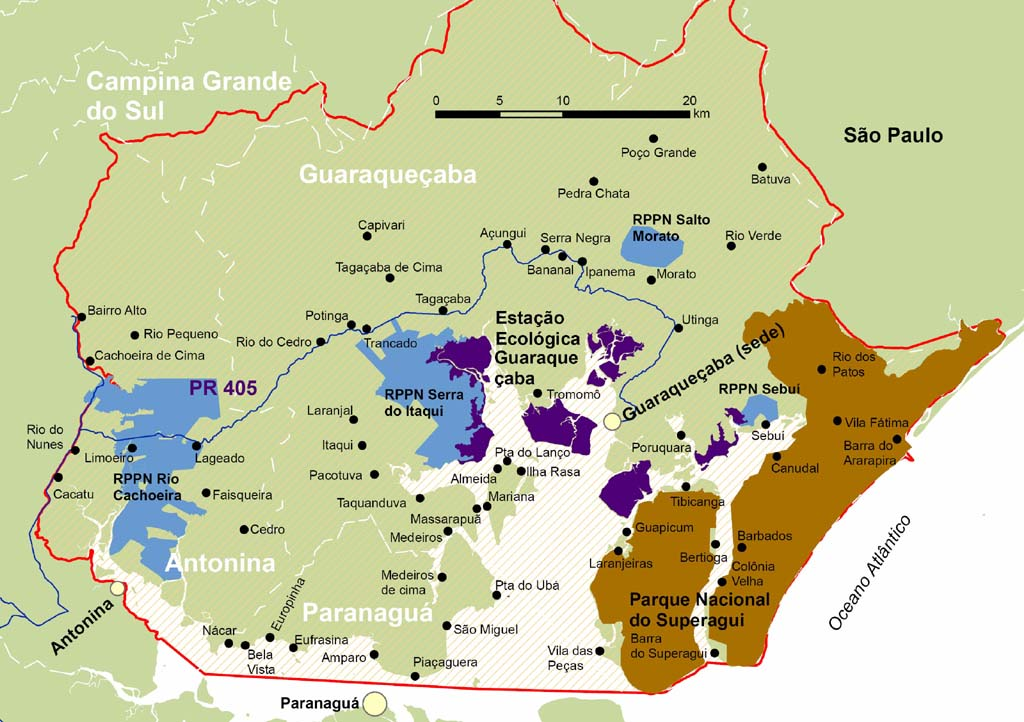
Guaraqueçaba Environmental Protection Area (Large red outline) and conservation units and communities it includes

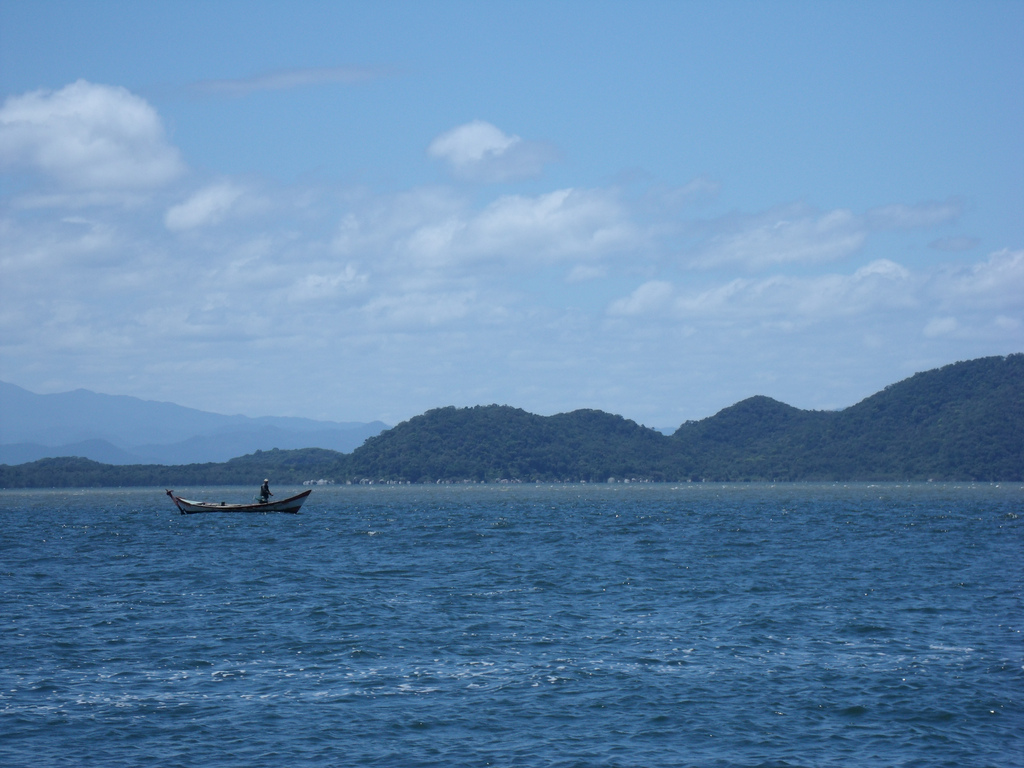
Boat on the estuary

== Sources ==
- Esec de Guaraqueçaba (in Portuguese), Chico Mendes Institute for Biodiversity Conservation, archived from the original on 2016-08-09
- "Estação Ecológica Guaraqueçaba", Ambiente Brasil (in Portuguese), 4 May 2010
- Unidade de Conservação: Estação Ecológica de Guaraqueçaba (in Portuguese), MMA: Ministério do Meio Ambiente
- Unidades de Conservação - Mosaico do Litoral Sul de São Paulo e do Litoral do Paraná - LAGAMAR (in Portuguese), ICMBio, archived from the original on 2019-05-27
