= Chauás Ecological Station =

Ecological station in São Paulo State, Brazil

- Estação Ecológica dos Chauás
- IUCN category Ia (strict nature reserve)
- Location within Brazil
- Nearest city: Iguape, São Paulo
- Coordinates: 24.750246°S 47.674517°W
- Area: 2,699.60 hectares (6,670.9 acres)
- Designation: Ecological station
- Created: 6 February 1987
- Administrator: Instituto Florestal / SP

The Chauás Ecological Station (Portuguese: Estação Ecológica dos Chauás) is an ecological station in the state of São Paulo, Brazil. It protects an area of lagoons and marshes in the Atlantic Forest biome, and is home to several endangered species. It is strictly protected, and is not open to the public.

== Location ==
The Chauás Ecological Station (ESEC) is in the municipality of Iguape, São Paulo. It has an area of 2,700 hectares (6,700 acres). Governor Paulo Egidio Martins issued decree 12.327 on 26 September 1978 to transfer an area of vacant land in Iguape to the State Secretariat of Agriculture. The Chauás Ecological Station was created by decree 26.719 of 6 February 1987 in this area of vacant land. The reserve is strictly protected and is not open to tourists.

The ESEC covers part of the Iguape-Cananéia lagoon complex in the extreme south of the state of São Paulo. The Momuna and Covuçu rivers run through the ESEC, which is in the Ribeira de Iguape River basin. It consists of periodically flooded plains, flood plains, and small terra firma terraces. There is some higher land in the north end. The ESEC is part of the Atlantic Forest Biosphere Reserve. It is part of the Lagamar Mosaic:

== Flora ==
The thousands of kilometers of mangroves that extend to Paranaguá in the state of Paraná are important breeding grounds for South Atlantic marine life. The forests of the slopes and coastal plains hold a great diversity of species. Vegetation is typical broad leaf forest of the coastal plain and marshes. It is mostly covered with high restinga forest, rich in Bromeliaceae and Araceae. There is also dense alluvial rainforest of the Atlantic Forest biome including Tabebuia cassinoides, palm trees, lianas and epiphytes. The caxeta (Tabebuia cassinoides) grows on the banks of the Momuna River. This tree, which grows in the flooded areas, has softwood that is used to make pencils and shoes, and is threatened by predatory logging. The palmito Euterpe edulis is also threatened.

== Fauna ==
The dark water rivers are home to freshwater turtles and the broad-snouted caiman (Caiman latirostris). Mammals such as the neotropical otter (Lontra longicaudis) and capybara live in the wetlands. The cougar (Puma concolor) is also present. 220 species of birds have been identified. These include blue manakin (Chiroxiphia caudata), yellow-legged tinamou (Crypturellus noctivagus), spot-winged wood quail (Odontophorus capueira), southern tamandua (Tamandua tetradactyla). Birds typical of the freshwater marshes include wren-like rushbird (Phleocryptes melanops) and orange-breasted thornbird (Phacellodomus ferrugineigula). Threatened bird species include the red-browed amazon (Amazona rhodocorytha), red-tailed amazon (Amazona brasiliensis), aracari and solitary tinamou (Tinamus solitarius).

== Sources ==
- ESEC dos Chauás (in Portuguese), ISA: Instituto Socioambiental
- "Estação Ecológica Chauas", Ambiente Brasil (in Portuguese), 14 May 2010
- Estação Ecológica dos Chauás (in Portuguese), Governo do Estado de São Paulo, archived from the original on 2016-11-17
- Estação Ecológica dos Chauás (in Portuguese), Via Rural, archived from the original on 2016-11-17
- Unidades de Conservação - Mosaico do Litoral Sul de São Paulo e do Litoral do Paraná - LAGAMAR (in Portuguese), ICMBio, archived from the original on 2019-05-27
