= Lagamar Mosaic =

Protected area mosaic in Brazil

- Mosaico do Lagamar
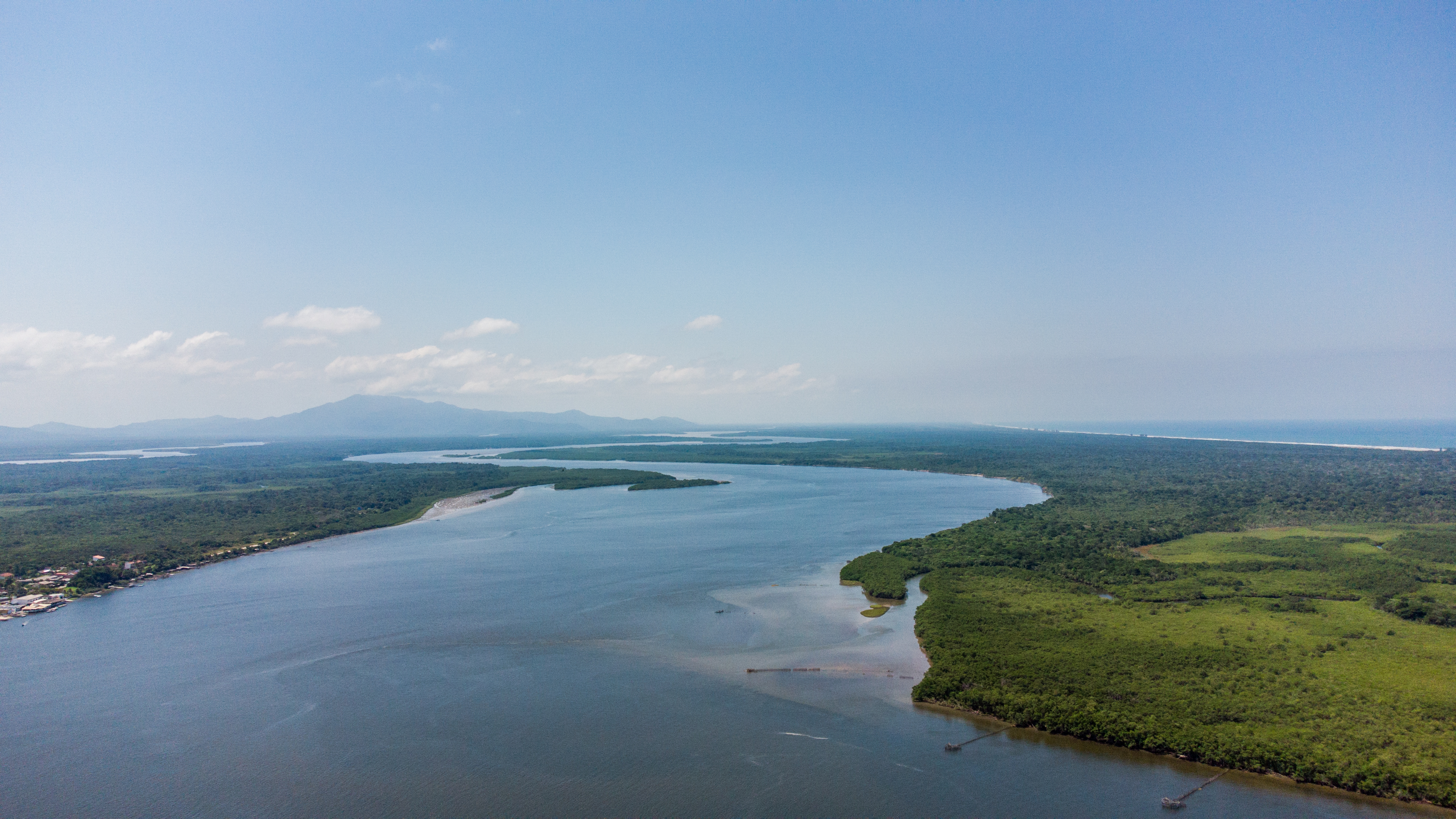
- Lagamar de Cananéia State Park

- Location within Brazil
- Coordinates: 25°01′08″S 48°01′37″W
- Designation: Protected area mosaic
- Administrator: ICMBio

The Lagamar Mosaic (Portuguese: Mosaico do Lagamar is a protected area mosaic that includes a number of conservation units in the states of São Paulo and Paraná, Brazil.

== History ==
The Lagamar Mosaic was established by federal ordinance 150 of 8 May 2006. The project was supported by the "Mangroves of Brazil" project as a way of leveraging joint action among the municipal, state and federal mangrove conservation units. In 2009 about 40% of the area was included as a pilot area of the "Mangroves of Brazil" project. The mosaic council was formed in October 2013, and included representatives of various government and civil society organisations.

== Scope and purpose ==
The mosaic includes strategic areas for conservation of the remaining mangroves of the south and southeast coasts of Brazil. Great effort is needed to preserve these areas, and also to preserve the traditional knowledge of the local population that depend on products of the native species. As of June 2014 there were 52 conservation units in the mosaic, forming the largest continuous remnant of Atlantic forest in Brazil. A mosaic is defined as a set of protected areas, of the same or different categories, adjacent or nearby, and other public or private protected areas, that are managed in a joint or integrated manner. The conservation units are made more effective by coordinating their activities.

== Conservation units ==
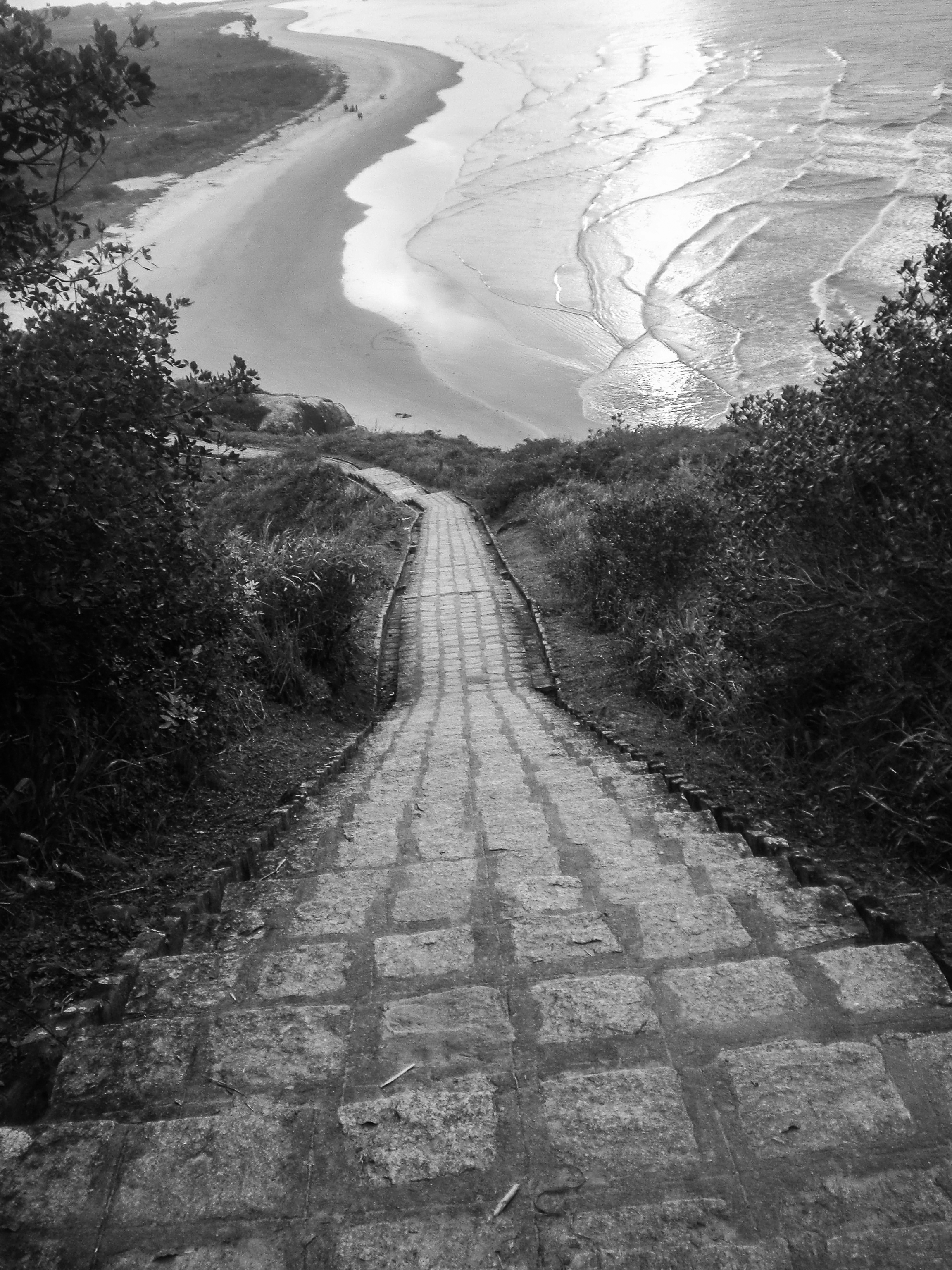
Path in the Ilha do Mel State Park

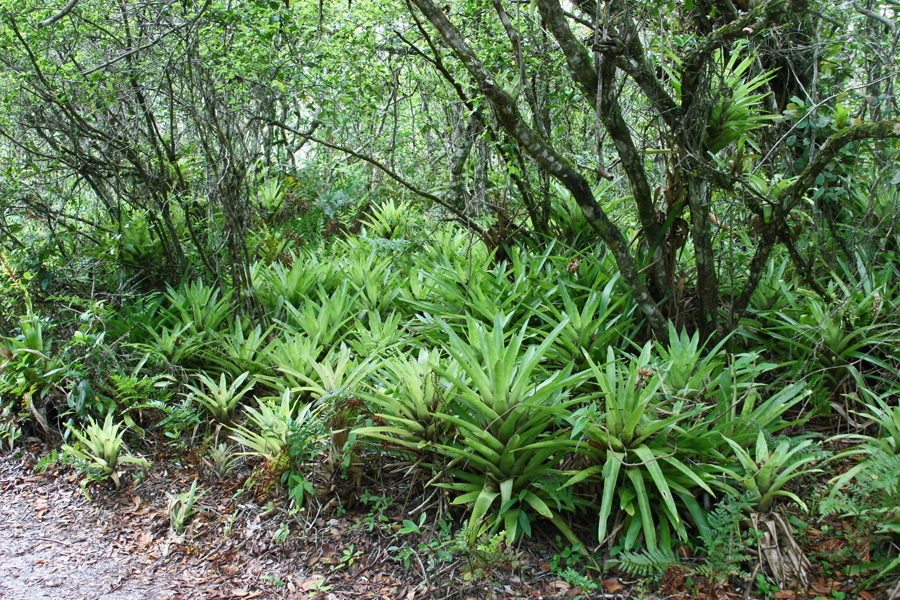
Vegetation in the Superagui National Park

The Lagamar Mosaic contains the following units:

Name	Type	Level
Boguaçu	State park	State
Bom Jesus	Biological reserve	Federal
Campina do Encantado	State park	State
Cananéia-Iguape-Peruíbe	Environmental Protection Area	Federal
Chauás	Ecological station	State
Graciosa	State park	State
Guaraqueçaba	Ecological station	Federal
Guaraqueçaba	Environmental Protection Area	Federal
Guaratuba	Environmental Protection Area	State
Ilha Comprida	Environmental Protection Area	State
Ilha da Queimada Grande e Queimada Pequena	Area of relevant ecological interest	Federal
Ilha do Ameixal	Area of relevant ecological interest	Federal
Ilha do Cardoso	State park	State
Ilha do Mel	Ecological station	State
Ilha do Mel	State park	State
Jacupiranga (Note: On 21 February 2008 the Jacupiranga State Park was dissolved and replaced by the much larger Jacupiranga Mosaic, containing three state parks and 11 other conservation units.)	State park	State
Juréia-Itatins	Ecological station	State
Lagoa do Parado	Municipal nature park	Municipal
Mandira	Extractive reserve	Federal
Pau Oco	State park	State
Pico Paraná	State park	State
Pico do Marumbi	State park	State
Restinga	Municipal nature park	Municipal
Rio das Onças	State park	State
Rio Perequê	Municipal nature park	Municipal
Roberto Ribas Lange	State park	State
Saint-Hilaire/Lange	National park	Federal
Salto Morato	Private natural heritage reserve	Federal
Sebuí	Private natural heritage reserve	Federal
Serra da Baitaca	State park	State
Superagui	National park	Federal
Tupiniquins	Ecological station	Federal

== Sources ==
- Instalada Gestao Integrada do Mosaico Lagamar (in Portuguese), ISA: Instituto Socioambiental, 20 December 2013
- Mosaico Lagamar: você sabe o que é? (in Portuguese), SPVS, 20 June 2014
- Unidades de Conservação - Mosaico do Litoral Sul de São Paulo e do Litoral do Paraná - LAGAMAR (in Portuguese), ICMBio, archived from the original on 2019-05-27
- Zanchetta, Inês; Bedeschi, Luciana (28 February 2008), Mosaico do Jacupiranga, no Vale do Ribeira, agora é lei (in Portuguese), ISA: Instituto Socioambiental, archived from the original on 2016-11-21
