= Salto Morato Private Natural Heritage Reserve =

Natural heritage reserve in Brazil

- Reserva Natural Salto Morato
- Location within Brazil
- Nearest city: Guaraqueçaba, Paraná
- Coordinates: 25°10′25″S 48°18′00″W
- Area: 819.18 hectares (2,024.2 acres)
- Designation: Private natural heritage reserve
- Created: 7 December 1994

The Salto Morato Private Natural Heritage Reserve (Portuguese: Reserva Natural Salto Morato is a private natural heritage reserve in the state of Paraná, Brazil. It protects an area of Atlantic Forest that is home to many endemic bird species.

== Location ==
The Salto Morato Private Natural Heritage Reserve is in the municipality of Guaraqueçaba on the coast of the north of Paraná. The property has an area of 2,253 hectares (5,570 acres). Of this, 819.18 hectares (2,024.2 acres) has been officially recognized as a Private Natural Heritage Reserve, but the remainder is managed in the same way and should be recognized after regularization of land titles. There are interpretive trails, a visitor center, kiosks, camping, lodging for researchers, a research center and a laboratory. There is a meteorological station that is part of the Paraná Meteorological System (SIMEPAR). Pets are not allowed. The reserve has supported scientific research from time of opening.

== Environment ==
The reserve protects an area of Atlantic Forest. It includes alluvial, submontane, montane and high montane formations. It also protects landscapes of rare beauty, such as the Garacuí and Morato mountains and the Salto Morato waterfall, with a height of about 120 metres (390 ft) It is home to a significant number of endemic species of birds. 646 vascular plant species have been identified as well as 93 mammal species, 325 bird species, 36 reptile species, 61 amphibian species and 55 fish species. The reserve is part of the Lagamar Mosaic of conservation units. Researchers have found two new species of fish and a new species of three-toed frog. There is a 100-year-old fig tree, the Figueira do río Engenho, whose roots form a natural bridge over 6 metres (20 ft) of the Ingenio River.

== History ==
The land was purchased by the Fundação Grupo Boticário de Proteção à Natureza (Note: The Fundação Grupo Boticário de Proteção à Natureza is a non profit organization established by O Boticário, a major cosmetic company.) in 1994 with support from The Nature Conservancy, and was recognized as a Private Natural Heritage Reserve the same year. The Salto Morato Private Natural Heritage Reserve was created by ordnance 132 of 7 December 1994 with an area of 819.18 hectares (2,024.2 acres). It opened to the public in 1996. UNESCO recognized the reserve in 1999 as a natural World Heritage Site.

== Sources ==
- Guapyassú, Maísa (December 2011), Plano de Manejo da Reserva Natural Salto Morato – Guaraqueçaba, PR – Vol.1 (in Portuguese)
- Reserva Natural Salto Morato (in Portuguese), FGBPN: Fundação Grupo Boticário de Proteção à Natureza
- RPPN Salto Morato (in Portuguese), ICMBio: Chico Mendes Institute for Biodiversity Conservation
- "Salto Morato Reserva Natural / Guaraqueçaba / Paraná / BRASIL", Viajes Erráticos (in Portuguese)
- Unidades de Conservação - Mosaico do Litoral Sul de São Paulo e do Litoral do Paraná - LAGAMAR (in Portuguese), ICMBio, archived from the original on 2019-05-27
