= Bom Jesus Biological Reserve =

Biological reserve in Paraná, Brazil

- Reserva Biológica Bom Jesus
- IUCN category Ia (strict nature reserve)
- Location within Brazil
- Nearest city: Paranaguá, Paraná
- Coordinates: 25.388872°S 48.556029°W
- Area: 34,179.74 hectares (84,460.0 acres)
- Designation: Biological reserve
- Created: 5 June 2012
- Administrator: Chico Mendes Institute for Biodiversity Conservation

The Bom Jesus Biological Reserve (Portuguese: Reserva Biológica Bom Jesus) is a biological reserve in the state of Paraná, Brazil.

== Location ==
The Bom Jesus Biological Reserve is in the municipalities of Antonina (30%), Guaraqueçaba (53%) and Paranaguá(17%) in the state of Paraná. The reserve has an area of 34,179.74 hectares (84,460.0 acres). It covers a mountainous area on the north side of Paranaguá bay, opposite the town of Paranaguá. It is divided into two by the PR-405 highway, which cuts across it from west to east. The Superagui National Park lies to the east on the Atlantic coast. The reserve is in the Atlantic Forest biome.

== Conservation ==
The Bom Jesus Biological Reserve was created by decree on 5 June 2012 and is administered by the Chico Mendes Institute for Biodiversity Conservation. It is classed as IUCN protected area category Ia (strict nature reserve). The purpose is to preserve the Atlantic Rainforest ecosystem, specifically the dense rainforest and pioneer formations, the associated fauna and the local river system. It is part of the Atlantic Forest Biosphere Reserve and of the Lagamar mosaic of conservation units. Protected species include cougar (Puma concolor), brown howler (Alouatta guariba), margay (Leopardus wiedii), crab-eating fox (Cerdocyon thous), South American tapir (Tapirus terrestris) and ocelot (Leopardus pardalis). The palm tree Euterpe edulis is also protected.

== Sources ==
- Rebio Bom Jesus (in Portuguese), Chico Mendes Institute for Biodiversity Conservation
- REBIO Bom Jesus (in Portuguese), ISA: Instituto Socioambiental
- Unidade de Conservação: Reserva Biológica Bom Jesus (in Portuguese), MMA: Ministério do Meio Ambiente
