= Tupiniquins Ecological Station =

- Estação Ecológica dos Tupiniquins
- IUCN category Ia (strict nature reserve)
- Location within Brazil
- Nearest city: Iguape, São Paulo
- Coordinates: 25°04′44″S 47°13′01″W
- Area: 1,728 hectares (4,270 acres)
- Designation: Ecological station
- Created: 21 July 1986

Tupiniquins Ecological Station (Portuguese: Estação Ecológica dos Tupiniquins) is a coastal marine ecological station on the coast of São Paulo State, Brazil.

== Location ==
The Tupiniquins Ecological Station is a coastal marine area of 1,728 hectares (4,270 acres) that was created on 21 July 1986. It is administered by the Chico Mendes Institute for Biodiversity Conservation. It is in the municipalities of Cananéia, Itanhaém and Peruíbe in São Paulo State. The unit includes the following islands and islets:

Locations in São Paulo

Island/Islet	Coordinates
A. Ilha Queimada Pequena	24.375526°S 46.806452°W
B. Ilhota das Gaivotas	24.374784°S 46.804010°W
C. Ilha de Peruibe	24.361591°S 46.980299°W
D. Ilha do Cambriú	25.164900°S 47.911505°W
E. Ilha do Castilho	25.273521°S 47.954857°W

== Conservation and environment ==
The Ecological Station is a "strict nature reserve" under IUCN protected area category Ia. The purpose is to conserve nature and support research. Average rainfall is 2,248 millimetres (88.5 in) and average temperature 21 °C (70 °F). Vegetation is from the Atlantic Forest biome with plants typical of salt marshes, sandy ridges, plains and continental beaches. Migratory bird species included royal tern (Thalasseus maximus), Sandwich tern (Thalasseus sandvicensis), South American tern (Sterna hirundinacea) and peregrine falcon (Falco peregrinus). The conservation unit is part of the Lagamar mosaic.

== Sources ==
- Edilene Oliveira de Menezes (2008), Plano de Manejo da Estação Ecológica dos Tupiniquins (PDF) (in Portuguese), Instituto Chico Mendes de Conservação da Biodiversidade
- Esec de Tupiniquins (in Portuguese), Chico Mendes Institute for Biodiversity Conservation
- Unidade de Conservação: Estação Ecológica dos Tupiniquins, MMA: Ministério do Meio Ambiente
- Unidades de Conservação - Mosaico do Litoral Sul de São Paulo e do Litoral do Paraná - LAGAMAR (in Portuguese), ICMBio
