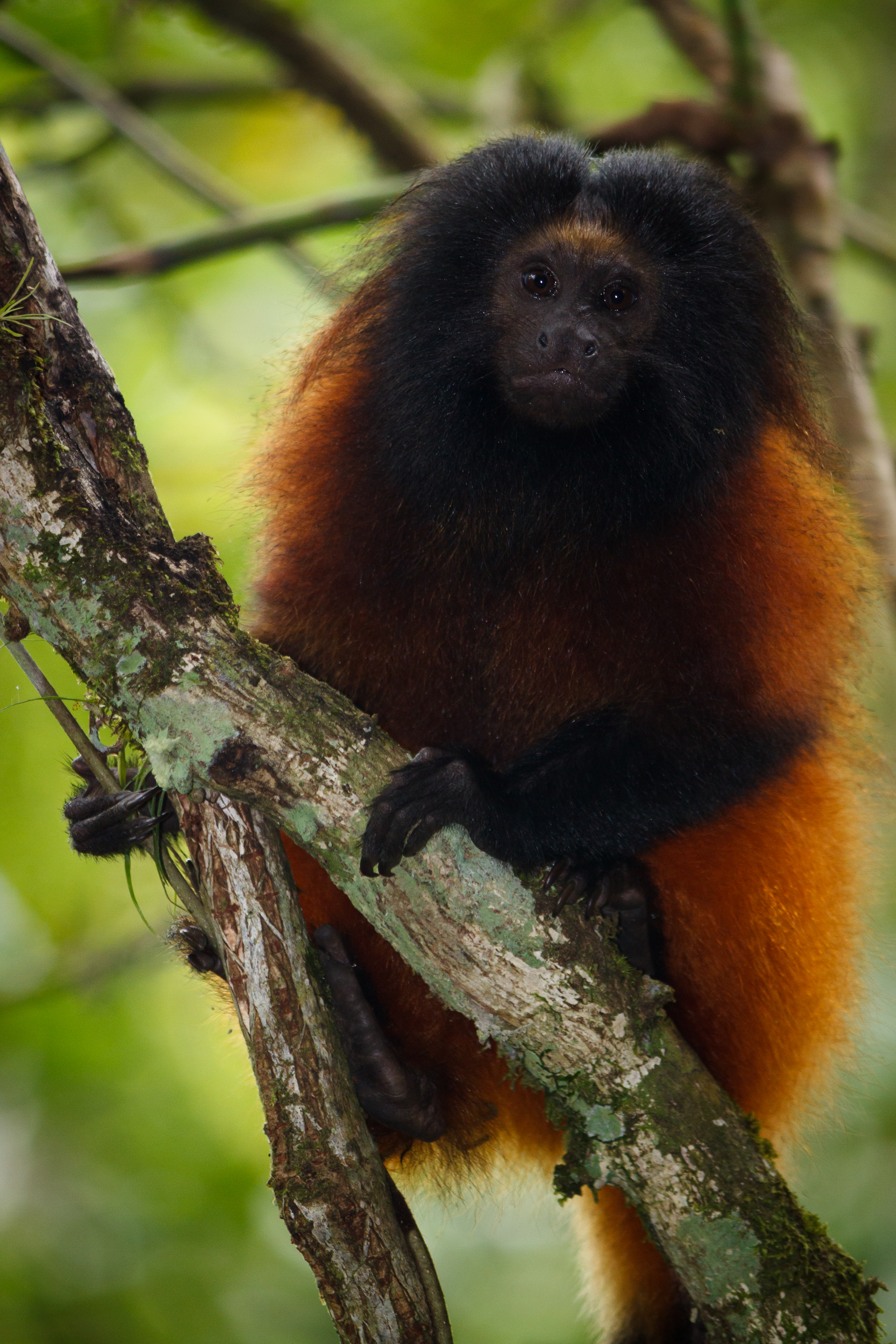

Conservation status
- Endangered (IUCN 3.1)
- CITES Appendix I

Scientific classification
- Kingdom: Animalia
- Phylum: Chordata
- Class: Mammalia
- Infraclass: Placentalia
- Order: Primates
- Family: Callitrichidae
- Genus: Leontopithecus
- Species: L. caissara

Binomial name
- Leontopithecus caissara Lorini & Persson, 1990
- Geographic range

= Superagüi lion tamarin =

Species of New World monkey

The black-faced lion tamarin or Superagüi lion tamarin (Leontopithecus caissara) is a small New World monkey of the family Callitrichidae. It is endangered and endemic to coastal forests in southeastern Brazil. There are several conservation projects and the total populations is unlikely to exceed 400 individuals. It is overall golden-orange with contrasting black head, legs and tail.

The black-faced lion tamarin was not recognized until 1990 when two Brazilian researchers, Maria Lucia Lorini and Vanessa Persson, described it based on individuals from the island of Superagui in the Brazilian state of Paraná. Shortly after additional populations were discovered on the adjacent mainland in Paraná and in the far southern São Paulo. The specific name caissara is a reference to the caicaras, the local people of Superagui Island.

Mainland populations prefer swampy and inundated secondary forest for habitat. The island population use mainly tall lowland forest and arboreal restinga (coastal forest on sandy soils) as primary habitat. Both populations strictly remain at altitudes below 40 m (130 ft).

== Behavior ==
The black-faced lion tamarin is an arboreal species and primarily eats small fruits and invertebrates such as insect, spiders and snails. They are also known to drink nectar, eat the young leaves of bromeliads and consume mushrooms. They are thought to supplement parts of their diet with mushrooms during the dry season.

The black-faced lion tamarin lives in extended family groups with 2-8 members. Within these families there is normally only one breeding female per season. Births typically occur from September to March and females normally give birth to twins. Social interaction is a key component in maintaining a reproductive system such as this. Grooming is the most common form of affiliative behavior seen by the species specifically between the breeding pair.

== Conservation ==
=== Threats ===
The black-faced lion tamarin has such a specific habitat preference and low population (400 individuals in total, of which approximately half are mature) that habitat loss is the greatest threat to the species. Agriculture, development, fragmentation and extraction of heart-of-palm are the major causes for their habitat loss. It is also threatened from the illegal pet trade, hunting, increased tourism and inbreeding depression.

=== Protection and conservation projects ===
The Superagüi lion tamarin is listed as endangered by the IUCN, included on the Endangered Species Act and is listed on CITES Appendix I. Within Brazil, it is included on the national Official List of Species Threatened with Extinction and it is also on regional lists by both the Paraná and São Paulo states.

The Superagüi National Park covers most of the black-faced lion tamarin home ranges including Superagui Island and adjacent mainland parts of the state of Paraná. The national park is 33,988 hectares large and the black-faced lion tamarin is one of the endemic species that is used as a conservation unit for management of the park. The population in São Paulo is protected in the Jacupiranga State Park.

The Instituto de Pesquisas Ecológicas (IPÊ) began the black-faced lion tamarin conservation program in 1996 and through 2004 focused on learning the ecology and natural history of the species. In 2005, enough data was collected to create the first conservation action plan for the black-faced lion tamarin and its habitat. As well as collecting additional data, from 2005 to 2007 IPÊ completed a diagnostic of threats to the survival of the species. They then hosted the first Eco-Negotiation Workshop in Ariri (São Paulo) in 2009, with a focus on education and awareness of sustainable production. Currently some of their objectives include evaluating dispersal of young, refine the projected population, observe the effects of sea rise due to climate change, and promote sustainable harvest of heart-of-palm.
