= Guaraqueçaba =

City of Guaraqueçaba
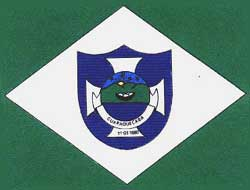
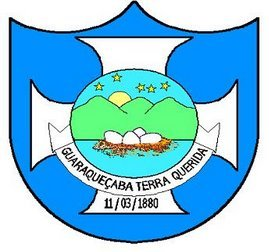
- Flag Coat of arms

- Location of Guaraqueçaba
- Coordinates: 25°18′25″S 48°19′44″W
- Country: Brazil
- Region: South
- State: Paraná
- Founded: October 10, 1947

Government
  - Mayor: Riad Said Zahoui (PSB)

Area
  - Total: 2,018.906 km^{2} (779.504 sq mi)
- Elevation: 10 m (33 ft)

Population (2020)
  - Total: 7,594
  - Density: 4.3/km^{2} (11/sq mi)
- Time zone: UTC−3 (BRT)
- HDI (2000): 0.659 – medium

Guaraqueçaba is the easternmost municipality in the Brazilian state of Paraná, and one of the few coastal municipalities of the state. The short Ararapira River marks the border with São Paulo.

Guaraqueçaba has historical significance, being among the first Portuguese settlements in the state of Paraná in 1545.

In 1938 the municipality of Guaraqueçaba was abolished and its territory was absorbed into that of Paranaguá. However, in 1947 Guaraqueçaba had it municipal rights restored.

== Conservation ==
The municipality contains the 819-hectare (2,020-acre) Salto Morato Private Natural Heritage Reserve, created in 1994. It contains the 400-hectare (990-acre) Sebuí Private Natural Heritage Reserve, created in 1999. It contains the Guaraqueçaba Ecological Station in the coastal mangrove area. It also holds 53% of the 34,179-hectare (84,460-acre) Bom Jesus Biological Reserve, a strictly protected conservation unit established in 2012.

== Climate ==
Climate data for Guaraqueçaba, elevation 40 m (130 ft), (1979–2016)
Month	Jan	Feb	Mar	Apr	May	Jun	Jul	Aug	Sep	Oct	Nov	Dec	Year
Record high °C (°F)	40.2 (104.4)	40.2 (104.4)	39.0 (102.2)	37.8 (100.0)	35.4 (95.7)	34.0 (93.2)	34.0 (93.2)	37.4 (99.3)	39.6 (103.3)	40.0 (104.0)	40.4 (104.7)	40.2 (104.4)	40.4 (104.7)
Mean daily maximum °C (°F)	30.2 (86.4)	30.4 (86.7)	29.0 (84.2)	27.1 (80.8)	24.5 (76.1)	23.0 (73.4)	22.3 (72.1)	23.1 (73.6)	23.2 (73.8)	25.3 (77.5)	27.3 (81.1)	29.2 (84.6)	26.2 (79.2)
Daily mean °C (°F)	24.7 (76.5)	24.9 (76.8)	24.0 (75.2)	22.1 (71.8)	19.0 (66.2)	17.2 (63.0)	16.6 (61.9)	17.3 (63.1)	18.4 (65.1)	20.5 (68.9)	22.3 (72.1)	24.0 (75.2)	20.9 (69.7)
Mean daily minimum °C (°F)	21.0 (69.8)	21.3 (70.3)	20.5 (68.9)	18.7 (65.7)	15.6 (60.1)	13.7 (56.7)	13.2 (55.8)	13.8 (56.8)	15.3 (59.5)	17.2 (63.0)	18.6 (65.5)	20.1 (68.2)	17.4 (63.4)
Record low °C (°F)	13.3 (55.9)	15.0 (59.0)	9.8 (49.6)	6.2 (43.2)	1.6 (34.9)	0.4 (32.7)	0.2 (32.4)	1.2 (34.2)	3.0 (37.4)	8.0 (46.4)	9.0 (48.2)	13.4 (56.1)	0.2 (32.4)
Average precipitation mm (inches)	398.1 (15.67)	348.7 (13.73)	301.2 (11.86)	168.7 (6.64)	123.4 (4.86)	109.5 (4.31)	123.7 (4.87)	83.2 (3.28)	157.2 (6.19)	172.4 (6.79)	197.0 (7.76)	271.7 (10.70)	2,454.8 (96.66)
Average precipitation days (≥ 1.0 mm)	22	18	20	17	16	15	16	14	18	19	18	19	212
Average relative humidity (%)	84	85	86	87	88	88	88	87	87	86	83	83	86
Mean monthly sunshine hours	141.5	137.7	140.2	136.7	139.6	129.1	128.1	127.4	91.5	98.7	125.2	136.6	1,532.3
Source: IDR-Paraná
