= Superagüi National Park =

National park in Paraná, Brazil

- Parque Nacional de Superagüi
- IUCN category II (national park)
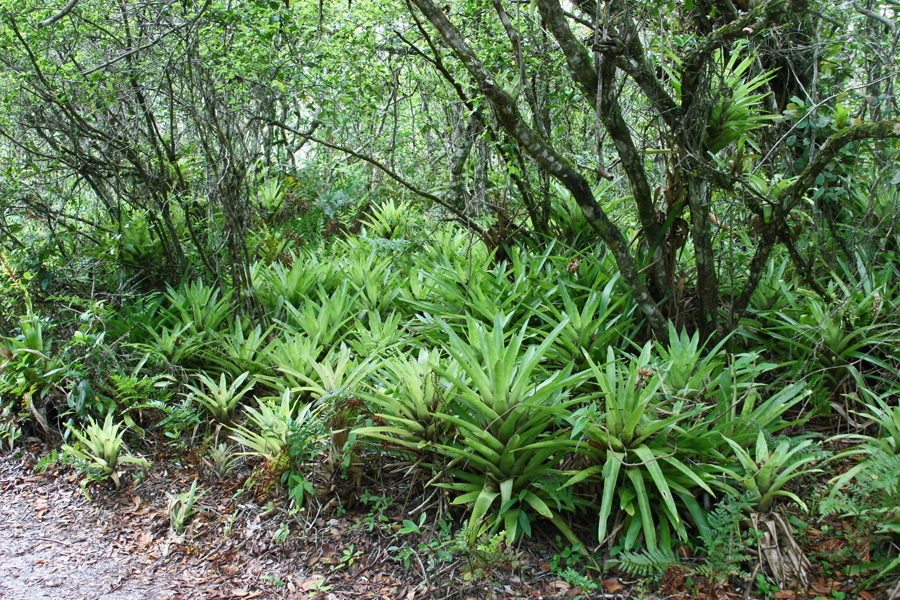
- Atlantic forest

- Location within Brazil
- Coordinates: 25°19′59″S 48°10′01″W
- Designation: National park
- Created: 1998
- Administrator: ICMBio

Superagüi National Park (Portuguese: Parque Nacional de Superagüi) is a national park on the coast of the state of Paraná, Brazil.

== Location ==
Created in 1998, the park has a total area of 34,000 hectares (84,000 acres), it comprises Superagüi Island, Peças Island, Pinheiro and Pinheirinho Islands, along with the Rio dos Patos Valley and the Varadouro Channel, which separates the island from the mainland.

Superagüi National Park was declared a Biosphere Reservation by UNESCO in 1991. In 1999, the park was declared a World Heritage Site. The park has bays, deserted beaches, sandbanks, estuaries, mangroves and abundant Atlantic Forest formations. The park is the primary habitat of the critically endangered Superagui Lion Tamarin, and hosts many other fauna and flora characteristic of the Serra do Mar subregion of the Atlantic Forest.

The conservation unit is part of the Lagamar Mosaic.

== History ==
Evidence indicates that the area has been occupied by fishermen since time immemorial. Prior to the arrival of Europeans it was inhabited by Carijós and Tupiniquins Indians. The Portuguese settled in the area from 1500 on, did not build cities.

In 1852, the Swiss consul in Rio de Janeiro, Perret Gentil, founded Supeargüi Island, one of the first European colonies in the state of Paraná, however, the colony didn't grow, and today the few villages that are within the park have only a few inhabitants, fishermen heirs of the 15 families brought by the consul to live in Superagui Island.
