= Iguape-Cananéia-Paranaguá estuary lagoon complex =

- Complexo Estuarino Lagunar de Iguape-Cananéia-Paranaguá (Portuguese)
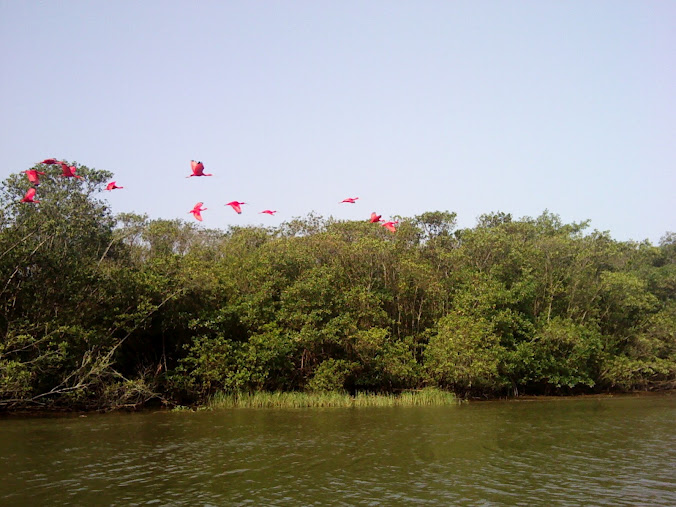
- Scarlet ibis over the Mar Pequeno

- Location in Brazil
- Location: Coasts of Paraná and São Paulo
- Coordinates: 25.060354°S 48.005333°W
- Primary inflows: Ribeira de Iguape River
- Ocean/sea sources: Atlantic Ocean
- Basin countries: Brazil

The Iguape-Cananéia-Paranaguá estuary lagoon complex (Portuguese: Complexo Estuarino Lagunar de Iguape-Cananéia-Paranaguá) is a stretch of interconnected coastal estuaries and lagoons that extends southwest from Iguape in the south of São Paulo past Cananéia, São Paulo to Paranaguá, Paraná. It includes the Mar Pequeno in São Paulo, between Ilha Comprida and the mainland, and Paranaguá Bay in Paraná.

== Location ==
The Iguape-Cananéia-Paranaguá estuary lagoon complex lies between 24°25′0″S 47°5′0″W (Barra do Una, SP) and 25°29′52″S 48°46′57″W (Morretes, PR) along the southeast São Paulo coast and the north Paraná coast. The complex covers an area of 2,950 square kilometres (1,140 sq mi). The region is within the Vale do Ribeira, the poorest part of São Paulo. The population grew by 27.18% from 1960 to 1980, but fell by 2.17% between 1980 and 1989. As of 1994 the human population was 153,164 inhabitants.

Altitudes range from 0 to 50 metres (0 to 164 ft). To the north the complex is bordered by the Juréia Massif and the Serra da Canavieira. In the south, Paranaguá Bay extends about 46 kilometres (29 mi) inland, and has depths up to 10 metres (33 ft). The 612 square kilometres (236 sq mi) Paranaguá Bay is an estuarine system rather than an estuary, connecting to the sea through three tidal channels and interconnected with the Iguape-Cananéia Bay system to the north. Tidal amplitude is about 1.5 metres (4 ft 11 in).

== Environment ==
The system includes many islands, barrier islands and river deltas, and is the most important ecosystem of the south coast of Brazil. Mean annual temperatures are above 20 °C (68 °F). Annual rainfall is over 2,000 millimetres (79 in). The greatest rainfall is in the summer, from December to February. Vegetation includes Atlantic Forest and extensive mangroves, as well as beaches and coastal dunes. The hillsides are covered by dense rainforest. The coastal strip has pioneer formations of marine influence on the sand banks, and mangroves of arboreal fluviomarine influence.

The environment is well preserved and is home to rich and diverse fauna of birds, mammals fish, molluscs and crustaceans. The complex is an important habitat for marine species. Locally endangered species include great horned owl (Bubo virginianus), tufted capuchin (Sapajus apella), collared peccary (Pecari tajacu), white-lipped peccary (Tayassu pecari), crab-eating raccoon (Procyon cancrivorus) and South American tapir (Tapirus terrestris).

== Conservation ==
Since 1980 the IUCN has considered the Iguape-Cananéia-Paranaguá estuary region to be one of high global importance for nature conservation. The estuary-lagoon complex, and the Vale do Ribeira as a whole, have a coordinated approach to environmental management, with a number of conservation units of different types. Some are within the Southeast Atlantic Forest World Heritage Site. The main environmental threats come from inefficient handling of chemical products in the port of Paranaguá, tourism-related real estate speculation in the beach areas, dumping of toxic agricultural waste and heavy metals into the Ribeira de Iguape River, which flows into the estuary, and lack of adequate sewage infrastructure.

The coastal communities are interested in maintaining the environment on which they depend for a living. They have been involved in regional conservation initiatives such as the planning and zoning process for the Cananéia-Iguape-Peruíbe Environmental Protection Area. Some communities have claimed responsibility for managing natural resources or protected areas. Implementation in 2002 of the 1,175 hectares (2,900 acres) Mandira Extractive Reserve, whose inhabitants are mainly involved in collecting mangrove oysters (Crassostrea brasiliana), was a positive example of sustainable development. With recognition and help in marketing, the people of the reserve became proud of their environmental conservation work and the quality of their products, and are seen as leaders in the region.

Conservation units covering parts of the complex include the Guará Area of Relevant Ecological Interest, Chaúas Ecological Station, Ilha Comprida Environmental Protection Area, Mandira Extractive Reserve, Taquari Extractive Reserve, Lagamar de Cananéia State Park, Itapanhapima Sustainable Development Reserve, Ilha do Cardoso State Park, Ilha do Tumba Extractive Reserve, Superagui National Park, Ilha do Mel Ecological Station, Ilha do Mel State Park, Guaraqueçaba Ecological Station and Sebuí Private Natural Heritage Reserve.

== Sources ==
- Brown, Jessica; Mitchell, Nora J.; Beresford, Michael (2005), The Protected Landscape Approach: Linking Nature, Culture and Community, IUCN, ISBN 978-2-8317-0797-6
- Diegues, A. C. (1992-01-01), "Vulnerability of Principal Brazilian Coastal Ecosystems to Climatic Change and Human Impacts", Workshop Report on the Environmental Implications of Global Change: 30 November - 1 December 1990, IUCN, ISBN 978-2-8317-0089-2
- Diegues, Antônio Carlos Sant'Ana (1994), An Inventory of Brazilian Wetlands, IUCN, ISBN 978-2-8317-0217-9
- "Mapa", Wikiaves (in Portuguese)
- Seeliger, U.; Kjerfve, B. (2013-03-14), Coastal Marine Ecosystems of Latin America, Springer Science & Business Media, ISBN 978-3-662-04482-7
