= Cananéia-Iguape-Peruíbe Environmental Protection Area =

Protected area in the State of São Paulo, Brazil

- Área de Proteção Ambiental de Cananéia-Iguapé-Peruíbe
- IUCN category V (protected landscape/seascape)
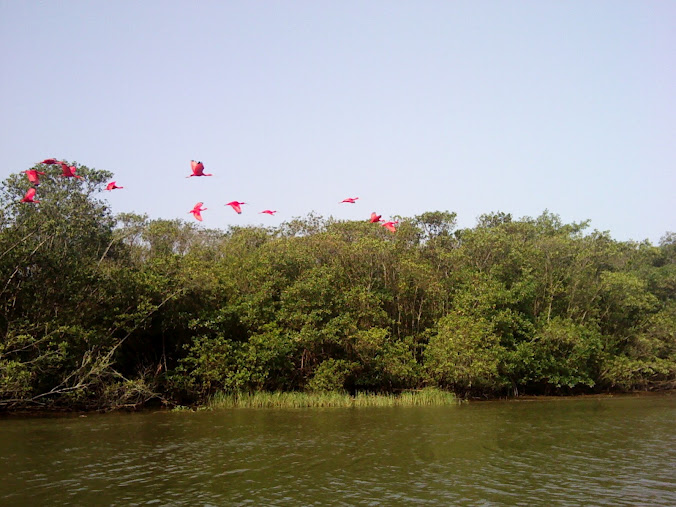
- Scarlet ibis over Mar Pequeno

- Location within Brazil
- Nearest city: Cananéia, State of São Paulo
- Coordinates: 24°51′07″S 47°52′05″W
- Area: 202,307.82 hectares (499,913.5 acres)
- Designation: Environmental Protection Area
- Created: 6 November 1985

Ramsar Wetland
- Official name: Environmental Protection Area of Cananéia-Iguape-Peruíbe
- Designated: 4 September 2017
- Reference no.: 2310

Cananéia-Iguape-Peruíbe Environmental Protection Area (Portuguese: Área de Proteção Ambiental de Cananéia-Iguapé-Peruíbe) is a protected area in the State of São Paulo, Brazil. It has been designated as a Ramsar site since 2017.

== Location ==
The Cananéia-Iguape-Peruíbe Environmental Protection Area (APA) covers an area of 202,307.82 hectares (499,913.5 acres) of coastal marine biome. It was created on 6 November 1985 and is administered by the Chico Mendes Institute for Biodiversity Conservation. It covers parts of the municipalities of Ilha Comprida, Peruíbe, Miracatu, Itariri, Iguape and Cananéia in the state of São Paulo. The area includes the basin of the Ribeira de Iguape River. The highest point is 500 metres (1,600 ft) above sea level.

The APA contains part of the Mandira Extractive Reserve. It overlaps with the state-level Ilha Comprida Environmental Protection Area, created in 1987. The conservation unit is part of the Lagamar mosaic.

== Environment ==
Annual rainfall is 2,200 metres (7,200 ft). Temperatures range from 4 to 35 °C (39 to 95 °F) with an average of 22 °C (72 °F). The area has a wide variety of Atlantic domain environments, and includes about 1,200 plant species. Environments range from tropical rainforest in the coastal plain to montane forest, cloud forest and alpine meadows. The slopes of the hills and mountains are typically covered by dense forest. The coastal strip includes fresh water and brackish marshes, sandbanks and mangrove. It is part of the Iguape-Cananéia-Paranaguá estuary lagoon complex.

Common plant species of the forest include Brasimopsis lactescens, Ficus species, Tabebuia cassinoides, Schyzolobium parahyba, Cedrela fissilis, Ocotea teleiandra and Euterpe edulis. The pioneer formations include Iresine portulacoides, Remirea maritima, Adcicarpha spathulata, Stenotaphrum secundatum, Sporobolus virginicus, Spartina ciliata and Panicum racemosum. Characteristic species in the mangroves are Rhizophora mangle, Laguncularia racemosa, Avicennia shaueriana and Spatina species.

Endemic fauna include Superagui lion tamarin (Leontopithecus caissara), yellow-legged tinamou (Crypturellus noctivagus) and red-tailed amazon (Amazona brasiliensis). Migratory bird species include sanderling (Calidris alba), rufous-chested plover (Charadrius modestus), American golden plover (Pluvialis Dominica) and red knot (Calidris canutus).

== Conservation goals ==
The protected area is classed IUCN protected area category V: protected landscape/seascape. The purpose is to protect biological diversity, control human occupation and ensure that natural resources are used in a sustainable way. Specific goals include allowing the caiçaras communities to exercise their traditional activities and preserving archaeological sites. Occupation of slopes at risk of erosion is avoided, and the area tries to protect and preserve ecosystems from the coastal mangroves to the higher-altitude meadows, protect endangered species and conserve the nesting areas of birds and water resources. Protected species include green sea turtle (Chelonia mydas) and Chaco eagle (Harpyhaliaetus coronatus).

== Sources ==
- APA de Cananéia-Iguape-Peruíbe (in Portuguese), Chico Mendes Institute for Biodiversity Conservation
- RESEX do Mandira (in Portuguese), ISA: Instituto Socioambiental
- Sobre a Área de Proteção (in Portuguese), SAP: Sistema Ambiental Paulista, archived from the original on 2017-01-27
- Unidade de Conservação: Área de Proteção Ambiental de Cananéia-Iguapé-Peruíbe (in Portuguese), MMA: Ministério do Meio Ambiente
- Unidades de Conservação - Mosaico do Litoral Sul de São Paulo e do Litoral do Paraná - LAGAMAR (in Portuguese), ICMBio, archived from the original on 2019-05-27
