= Ilha Comprida Environmental Protection Area =

Environmental protection area in the state of São Paulo, Brazil

- Área de Proteção Ambiental da Ilha Comprida
- IUCN category V (protected landscape/seascape)
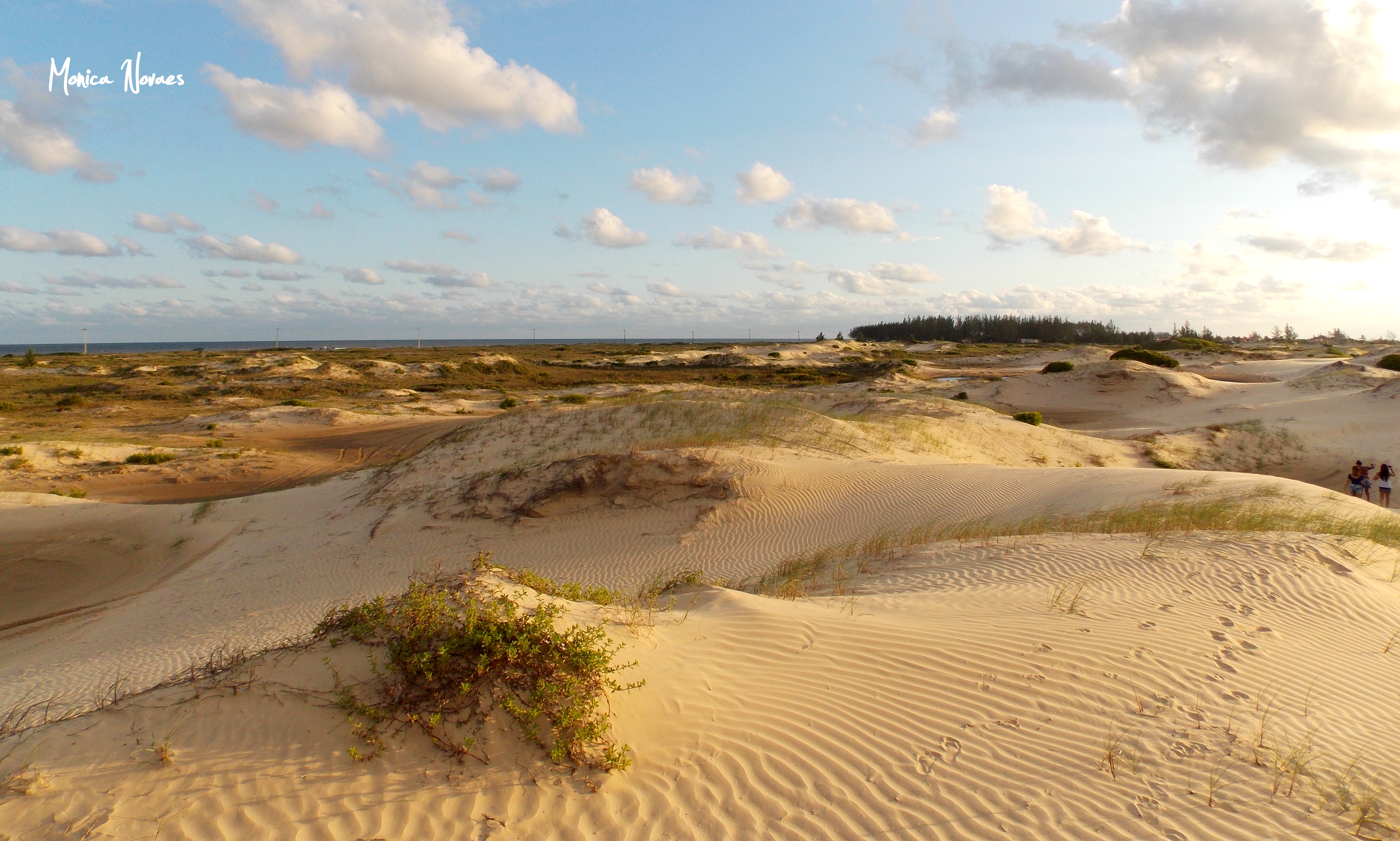
- Araça sand dunes on the island

- Location within Brazil
- Nearest city: Ilha Comprida, São Paulo
- Coordinates: 24.842°S 47.706°W
- Area: 17,572 hectares (43,420 acres)
- Designation: Environmental protection area
- Created: 11 March 1987

The Ilha Comprida Environmental Protection Area (Portuguese: Área de Proteção Ambiental da Ilha Comprida) is an environmental protection area in the state of São Paulo, Brazil. It protects an island with an environment of dunes, salt marshes and mangroves. There has been some difficulty reconciling conservation with human occupation of the island.

== Location ==
The Ilha Comprida Environmental Protection Area (APA) is in the municipality of Ilha Comprida, São Paulo, covering an island off the south coast of São Paulo. It has an area of 17,572 hectares (43,420 acres). The island extends along the coast in a southwest direction. It is 70 kilometres (43 mi) long and at most 5 kilometres (3.1 mi) wide. It is about 3 kilometres (1.9 mi) wide on average. It is separated from the mainland by the estuarine lagoon channel of the Mar Pequeno, the Valo Grande and the mouth of the Ribeira de Iguape River. With the exception of the 40 metres (130 ft) high Morrete, the only rock formation on the island, elevations rarely exceed 5 metres (16 ft) above sea level.

The northeast tip of the island is zoned as an area of relevant ecological interest, (Note: The Guará Area of Relevant Ecological Interest is on the northeast tip of the island.) and there are sections of urban area along the Atlantic coast, mostly in the northeastern part. The remainder is zoned as wildlife refuge or environmental protection area. There is overlap between the limits of the Ilha Comprida APA and the federal Cananéia-Iguape-Peruíbe APA managed by the Chico Mendes Institute for Biodiversity Conservation (ICMBio). The island is part of the Atlantic Forest Biosphere Reserve, and has been recognised by UNESCO as a World Heritage Site. The conservation unit is part of the Lagamar Mosaic.

== Environment ==
The climate is tropical, warm and humid. Average rainfall is about 2,000 millimetres (79 in) annually, and average temperature is 25 °C (77 °F). The Ilha Comprida Environmental Protection Area is in the Atlantic Forest biome, and contains restinga forest, dunes, beaches and mangroves. It is one of the last complexes of such ecosystems on the coast, a nursery of South Atlantic marine and terrestrial species, used by over 30 species of migratory birds, and the location of archaeological remains. It is part of the Iguape-Cananéia-Paranaguá estuary lagoon complex.

== History ==
The first settlements were made on the island in 1955. Since 1970 real estate speculation led to unplanned authorization of hundreds of lots, leading to disorderly occupation of land on the island. Most of the real estate development did not satisfy the infrastructure requirements that were a condition of their approval. There was growing concern about environmental damage. Federal decree 89.336 of 31 January 1984 declared that the Ilha Comprida was an area of relevant ecological interest and recommended that it be made a conservation unit. State decree 26.881 of 11 March 1987 made the island an environmental protection area (APA). This was before the island had been made a municipality. The purpose was to conserve the environment while allowing some human occupation.

Since then there has been ongoing occupation of the island by people, often without land titles, which has jeopardized the environmental balance. State decree 28.295 of 1988 suspended approval of land allocation until the APA regulations have been published. State decree 30.817 of 30 November 1989 defined zones within the APA and defined the allowed use and activities within each zone. It gave guidelines and standards to be followed to allow occupation without damaging the existing ecosystems. Since then the municipality has proposed revised zoning that would further reduce and fragment the wildlife protection areas and increase the urban areas.

Starting in August 2015 the Institute for Ecological Research (Ipê) has partnered with the São Paulo Foundation for Conservation and Forest Production to develop a management plan for the APA. The management plan, due to be completed in August 2016, would describe fauna, flora, physical environment and socioeconomic aspects. It would define land use and occupation rules, zoning and priority programs and actions. Preparation of the plan involved consultation with local residents, civil society organizations and government agencies.

== Sources ==
- "APA Marinha do Litoral Sul", Navegacao de Esporte e Recreio (in Portuguese)
- Lima, Cibele Oliveira; Oliveira, Regina Célia de (2013), A criação da APA de Ilha Comprida e seus desdobramentos no atual processo de desenvolvimento local (PDF)
- Moradores e Instituições da APA Ilha Comprida discutem o seu novo zoneamento (in Portuguese), Ipê - Instituto de Pesquisas Ecológicas, archived from the original on 2016-11-20
- Plano de Manejo da APA Ilha Comprida começa a ser estruturado (in Portuguese), Ipê - Instituto de Pesquisas Ecológicas
- Quércia, Orestes (30 November 1989), Decreto Estadual nº 30.817, de 30 de Novembro de 1989 (PDF) (in Portuguese)
- Sobre a Área de Proteção (in Portuguese), SAP: Sistema Ambiental Paulista, archived from the original on 2017-01-27
- Sobre a Ilha Comprida (in Portuguese), Visite Ilha Comprida
- Unidades de Conservação - Mosaico do Litoral Sul de São Paulo e do Litoral do Paraná - LAGAMAR (in Portuguese), ICMBio, archived from the original on 2019-05-27
