= Ilha do Cardoso State Park =

State park in São Paulo, Brazil

- Parque Estadual da Ilha do Cardoso
- IUCN category II (national park)
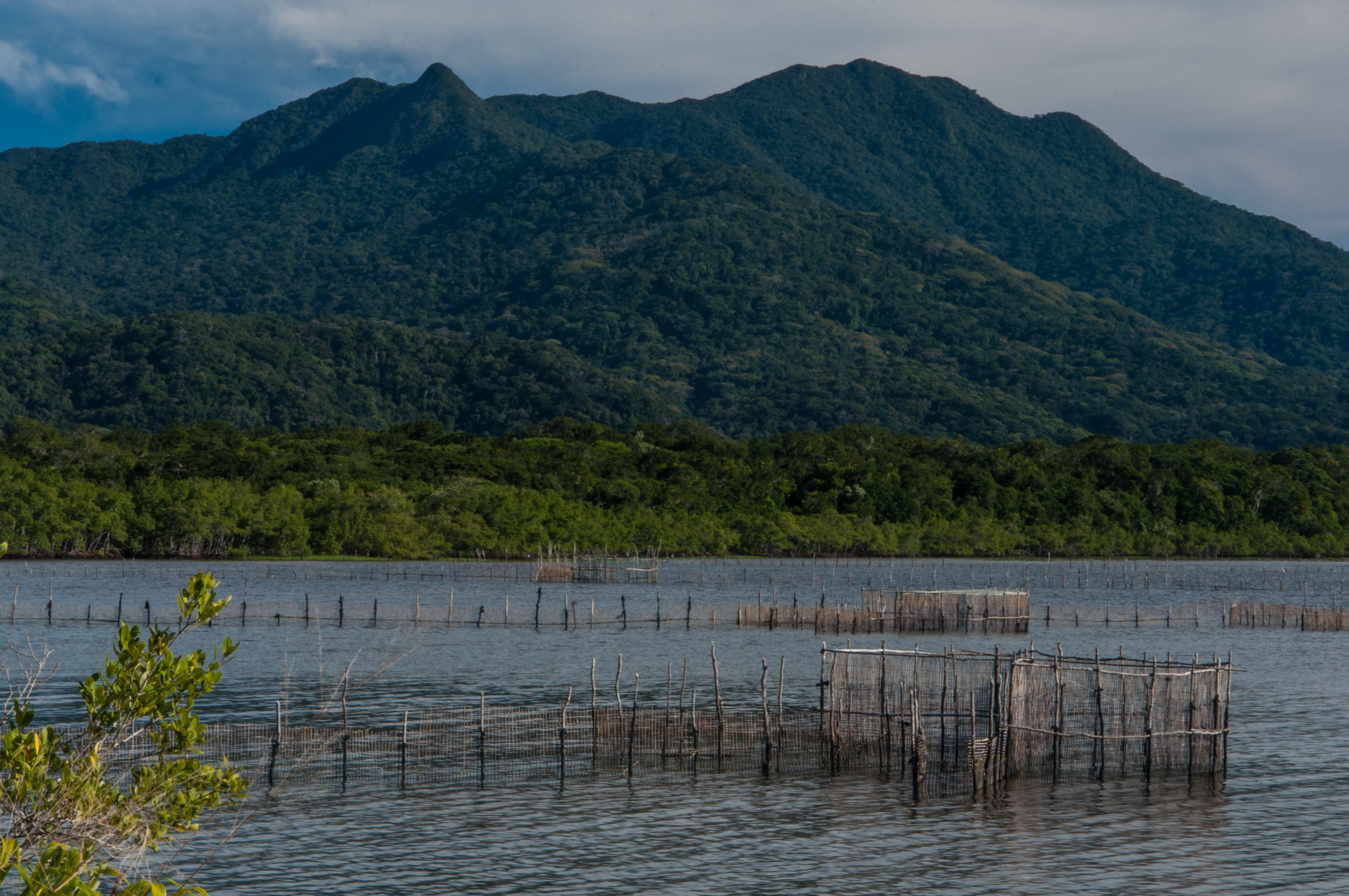
- Traditional fish traps in the park.

- Location within Brazil
- Nearest city: Cananéia, São Paulo
- Coordinates: 25.133°S 47.963°W
- Area: 13,500 hectares (33,000 acres)
- Designation: State park
- Created: 3 July 1962

The Ilha do Cardoso State Park (Portuguese: Parque Estadual da Ilha do Cardoso) is a state park on the coast of the state of São Paulo, Brazil. It preserves a large area of Atlantic Forest on the Ilha do Cardoso, an island, and includes marshes and mangroves that form an important breeding area for marine life. Visitors may reach the island by boat and stay in one of the villages. They may visit the beaches or follow trails into the interior, where there are waterfalls and natural pools.

== Location ==
The Ilha do Cardoso State Park is in the municipality of Cananéia in the extreme south of the state of São Paulo. It covers an area of 13,500 hectares (33,000 acres). The state park occupies about 90% of the Ilha do Cardoso, and can be reached by boat from the town of Cananéia. The island is bounded by the Atlantic Ocean to the east, the Bay of Trapandé to the north, the Ararapira Channel to the west and the Ararapira Bar to the south. The Atlantic coast has beaches, dunes and rocky shores. The park is part of the Lagamar Mosaic:

There are six communities of caiçaras in the park, with about 465 residents. They are strongly influenced by indigenous culture, and have developed an accurate knowledge of nature. They are mainly fishermen, and also gain significant income from tourism. Perequê, on the north shore, is 20 minutes by launch or 50 minutes by schooner from Cananeia. Marujá, in the south, is a fishing village with more accommodation and restaurants. It is 55 minutes by launch or 3 hours by schooner from Cananeia. The only electricity is provided by generators, which are turned off after 11:00pm.

== History ==
The Ilha do Cardoso State Park was created by state decree 40.319 of 3 July 1962. The park is home to the Center for Applied Research in Natural Resources of the Ilha do Cardoso (CEPARNIC), at first under the Secretary of State for Agriculture and Supply, and in the 1990s transferred the Secretary of State for the Environment.

In July 2023, the Caiçaras community living on Cardoso took over park operations in cooperation with state authorities, a "public-community conservation partnership".

== Environment ==
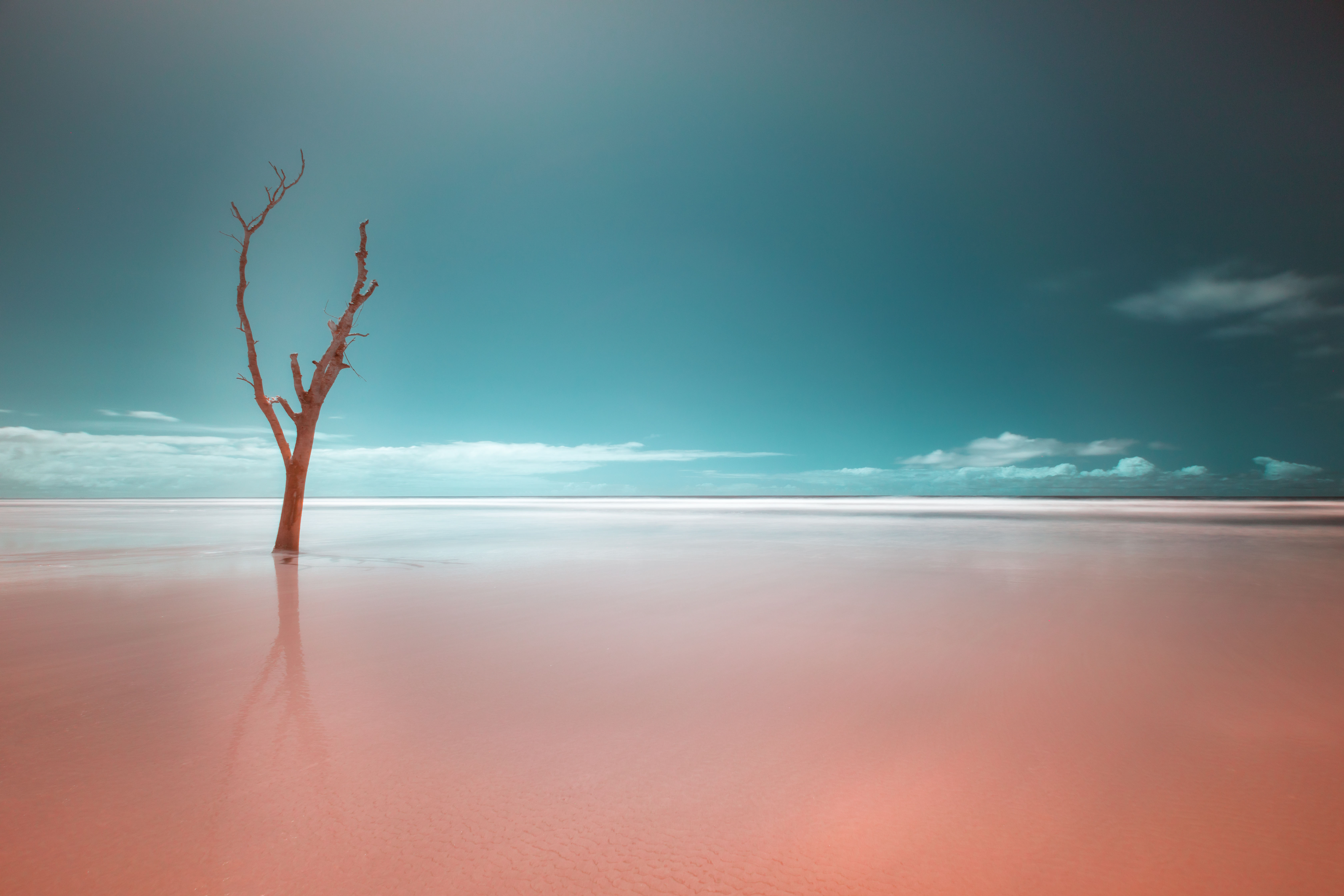
The Atlantic Ocean's water encroaching on a mangrove tree in the park

Between December and February average temperatures are up to 25 °C (77 °F) and there are constant rains. In July and August humidity is lower and average temperatures are 18 °C (64 °F) in the day and 10 °C (50 °F) at night. The park is in the Atlantic Forest biome. It has diverse vegetation including restinga, coastal forests and mangroves. The forest covers 90% of the island. The western side of the island has mangroves, and the coastal plain is mostly covered by restinga. Almost 1,000 plant species have been identified.

The park lies in the Iguape-Cananéia-Paranaguá estuary lagoon complex that stretches from Peruíbe in São Paulo state to Paranaguá in Paraná. The complex is one of the largest breeding grounds for South Atlantic marine species. The park is home to endangered fauna such as the red-tailed amazon (Amazona brasiliensis) and the broad-snouted caiman (Caiman latirostris). The park has many species of bromeliad, which host invertebrate and vertebrate communities, which have been studied in detail. There are many archaeological sites holding ruins of human occupation from the colonial period, and a landmark of the Treaty of Tordesillas.

== Attractions ==
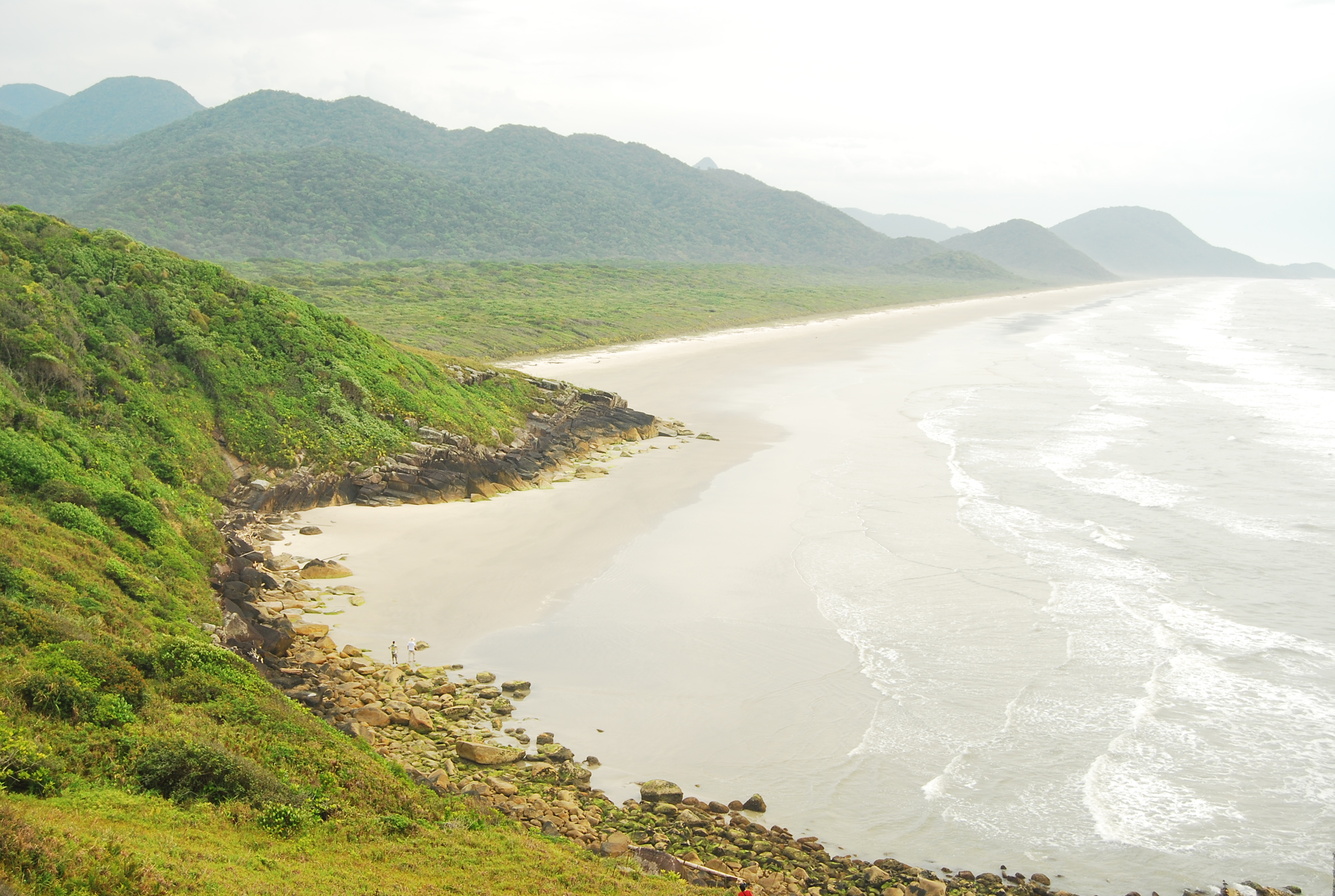
View from the trail to the Lage waterfall

The park has its headquarters in Perequê. Perequê has a visitor center and a waterfront kiosk on the Praia de Itacuruçá, and several trails. The busy fishing village of Marujá also has trails that lead to waterfalls and fountains. Boats may be hired in either center for trips to other parts of the island and hikes on trails, where visitors must be accompanied by monitors. The Cachoeira Grande (Great Waterfall) is reached from Marujá by a 15-minute boat ride and 20 minutes walk along a trail. Visitors can swim in the pool.

The beaches can be visited without a guide. The beaches of Laje, Ipanema, Fole Grande and Fole Pequeno have natural pools for swimming. Enseada da Baleia (Whale Cove) is a popular spot for families. The Praia do Marujá has 18 kilometres (11 mi) of clear sand, reached by a 10-minute trail from Marujá. The Pontal da Praia is at the north end of the island, 15 kilometres (9.3 mi) from Marujá. The Praia de Cambriú is 10 kilometres (6.2 mi) from Marujá at the mouth of the Cambriú River. The Praia da Laje is a large beach, with a 2.5-kilometre (1.6 mi) trail at the end that leads to freshwater pools. The Praia Ipanema has a natural pool for swimming. A trail leads from the beach to the Ipanema Waterfall.

== Sources ==
- Histórico/Sobre o Parque (in Portuguese), SAP: Sistema Ambiental Paulista, archived from the original on 6 August 2016
- "Ilha do Cardoso", Férias Brasil (in Portuguese)
- "Parque Estadual Ilha do Cardoso", Guia do Turista (in Portuguese)
- "Parque Estadual da Ilha do Cardoso", Viagem (in Portuguese), Editora Abril S.A.
- Sobre o Parque (in Portuguese), SAP: Sistema Ambiental Paulista
- Unidades de Conservação - Mosaico do Litoral Sul de São Paulo e do Litoral do Paraná - LAGAMAR (in Portuguese), ICMBio, archived from the original on 27 May 2019
