= Cholos pescadores =

Ethnic group in Ecuador

Cholos pescadores ('cholo fishermen', sg. cholo pescador) are a social group that live in Ecuador's Guayas and Manabí provinces. They are descended from Hispanicized indigenous coastal peoples, which were wiped out as political entities during the colonial era, but maintained a separate identity. Today, cholos pescadores continue to engage in fishing as their primary economic activity.

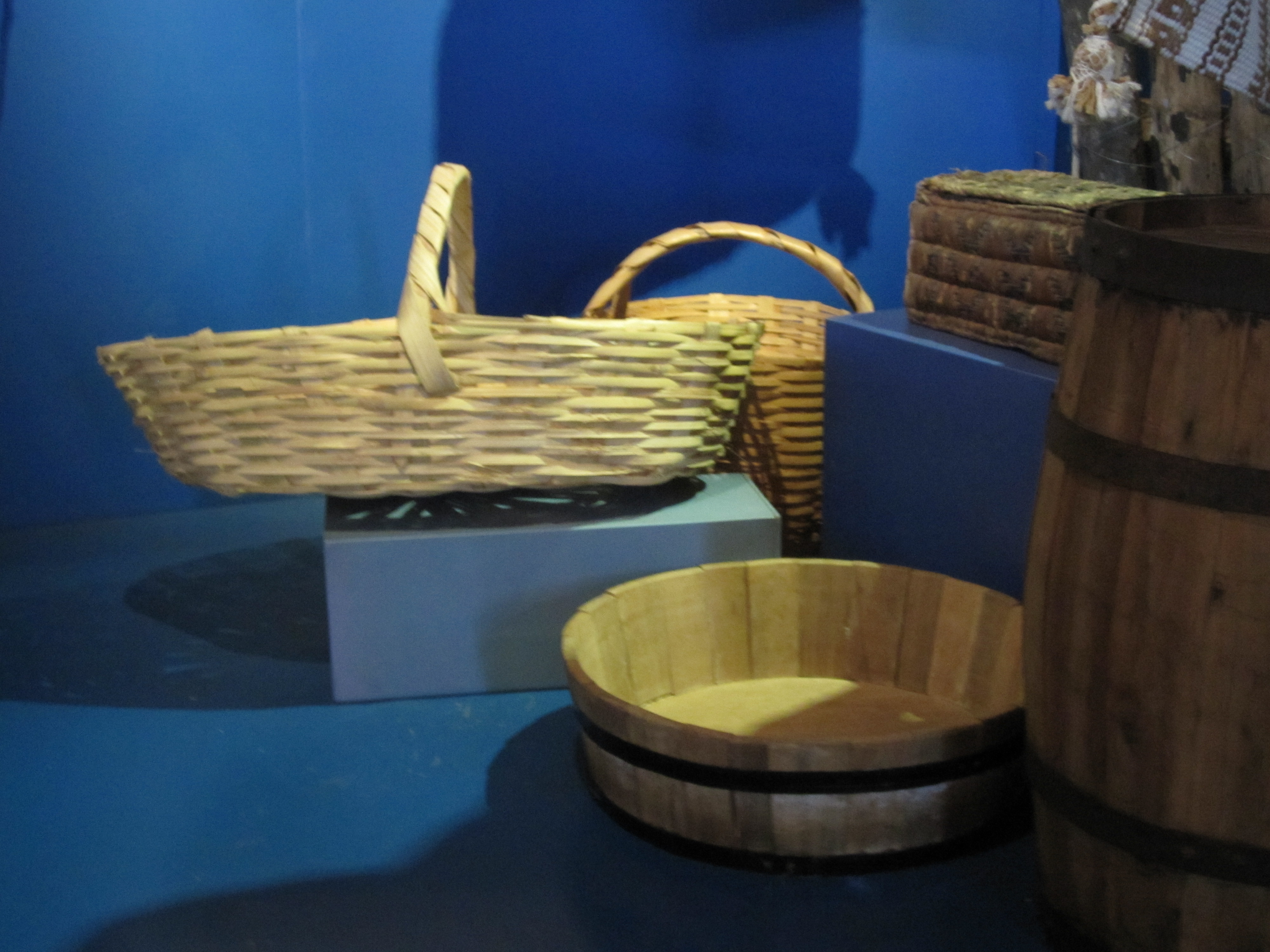
Cholo pescador basketry

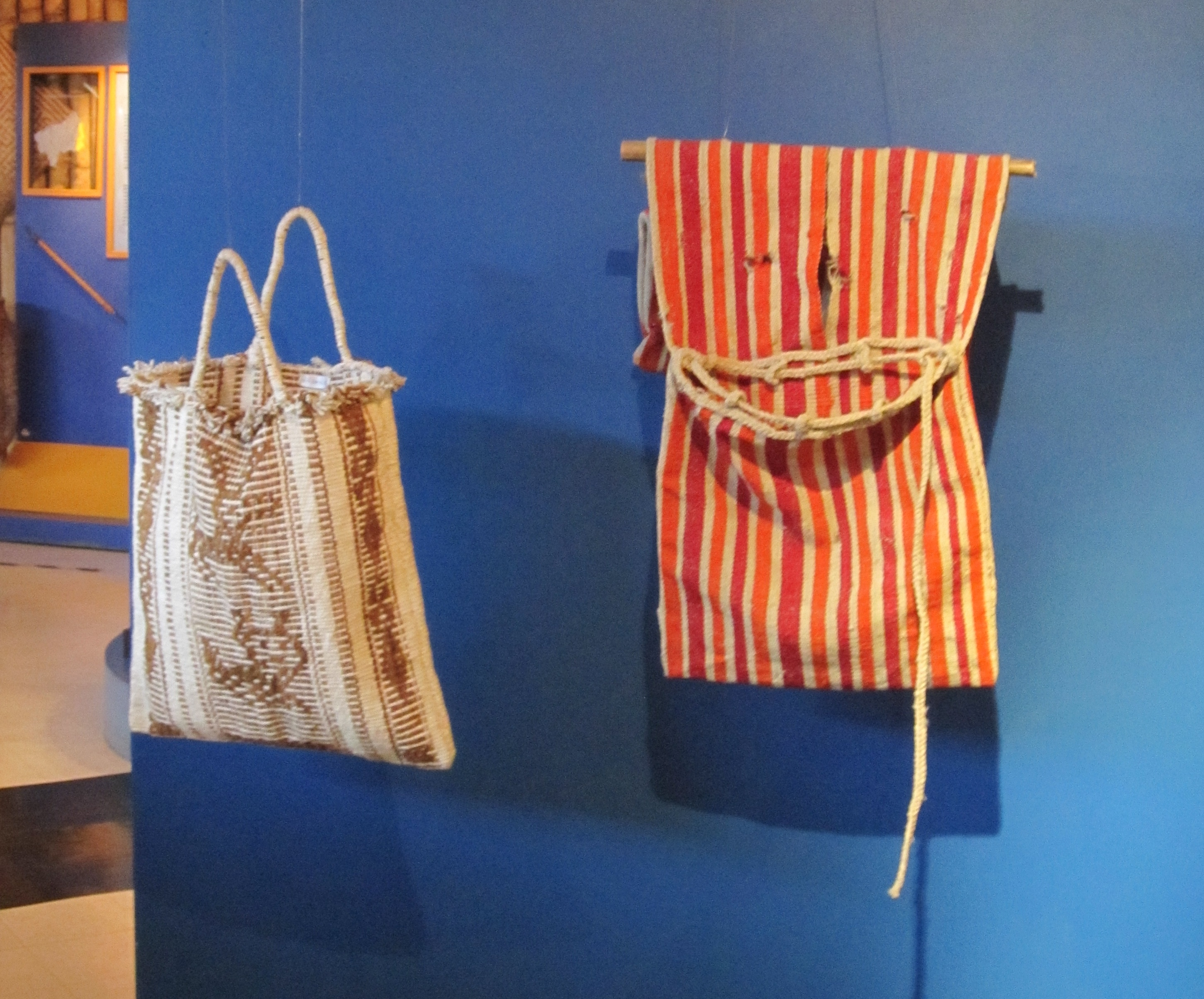
Cholo pescador bags

== See also ==
- Manteño civilization
- Montubio
- Caiçaras
- Cholo
- Ribeirinhos
