= Ilha Comprida =

- Municipality
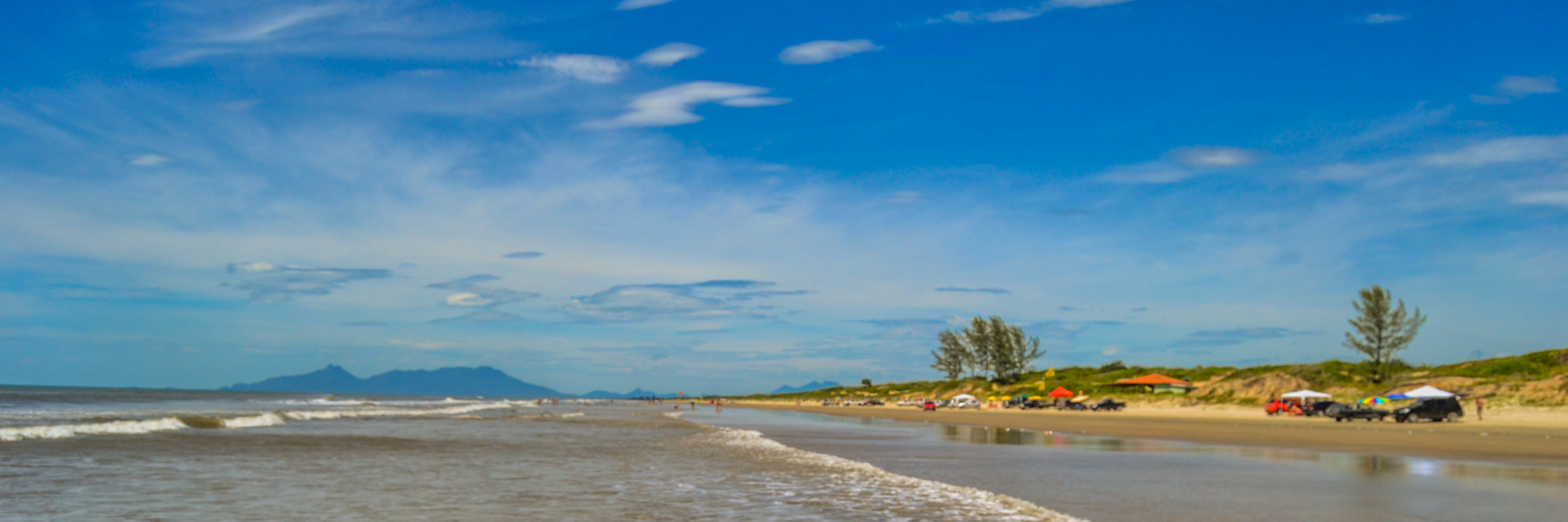
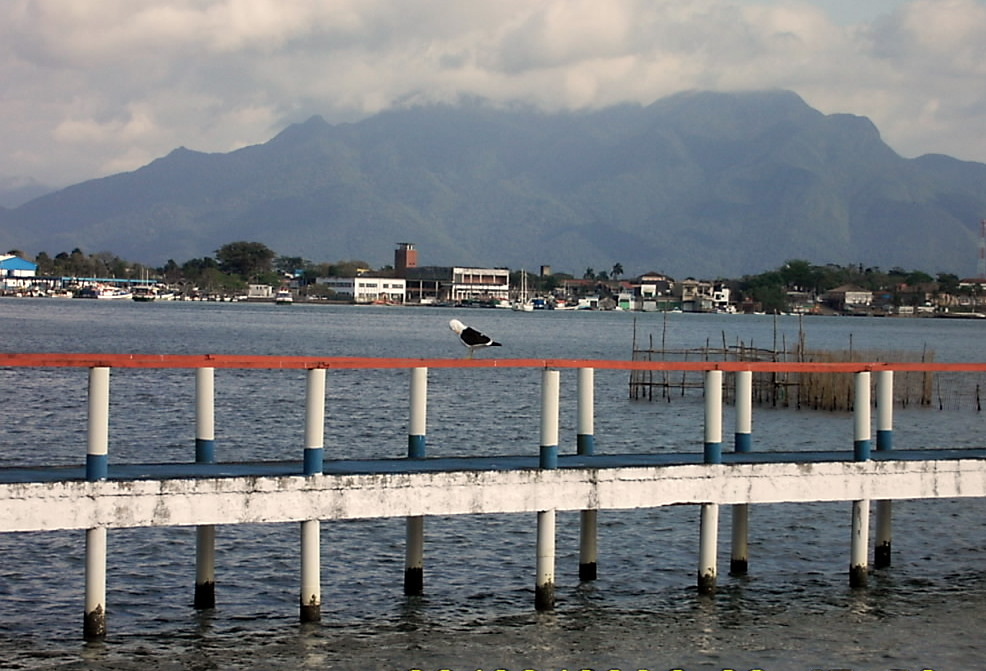
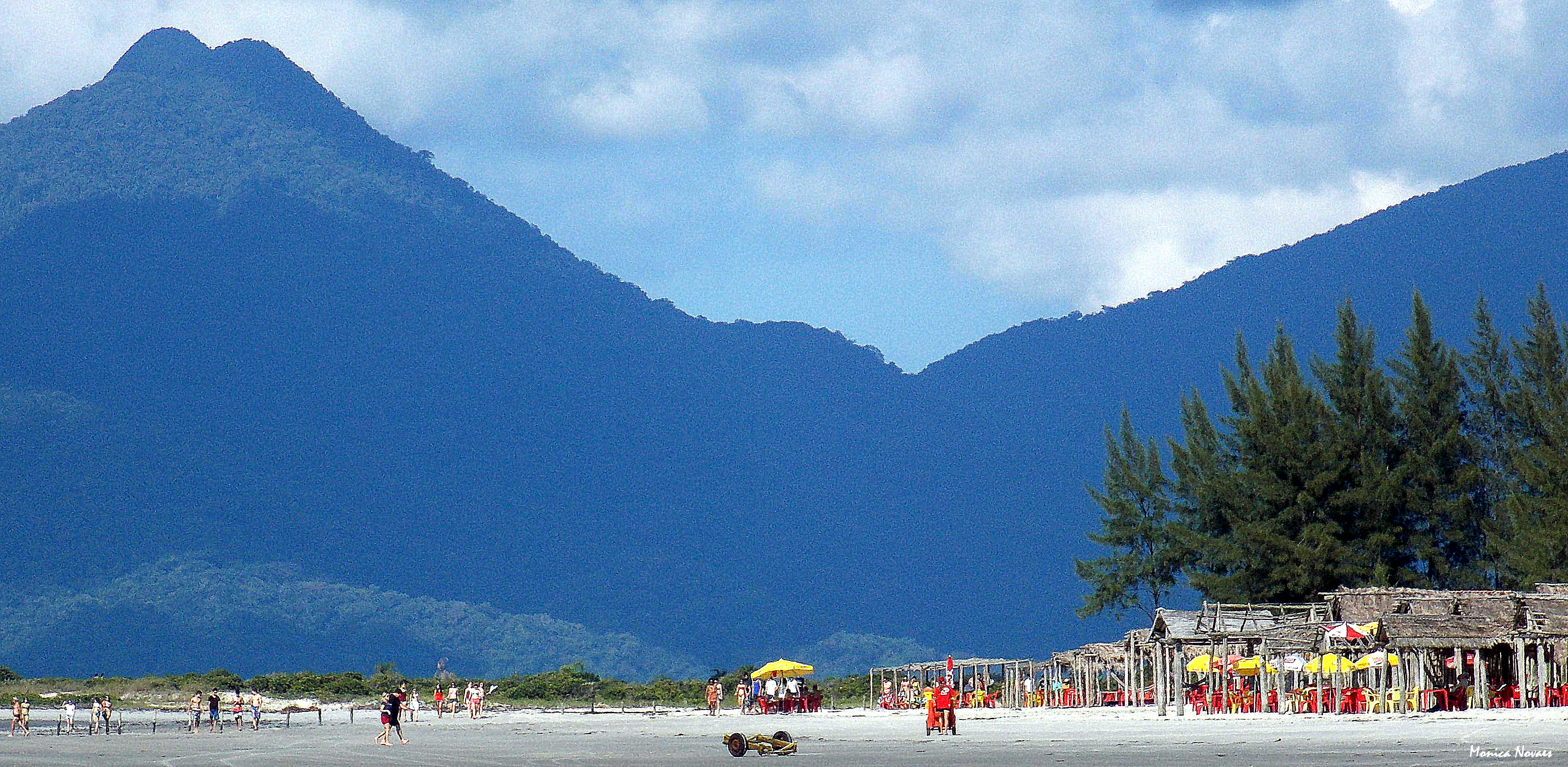
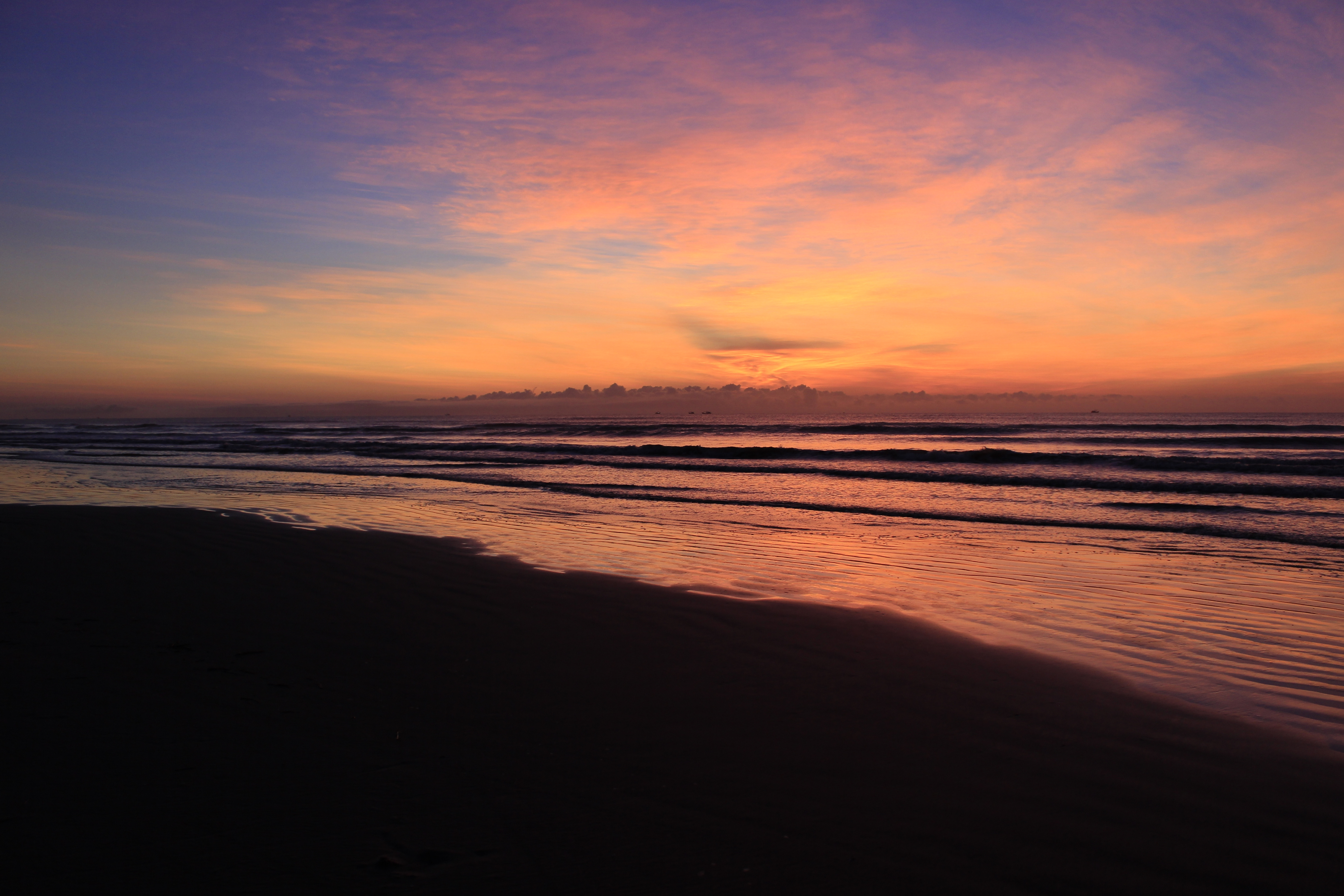
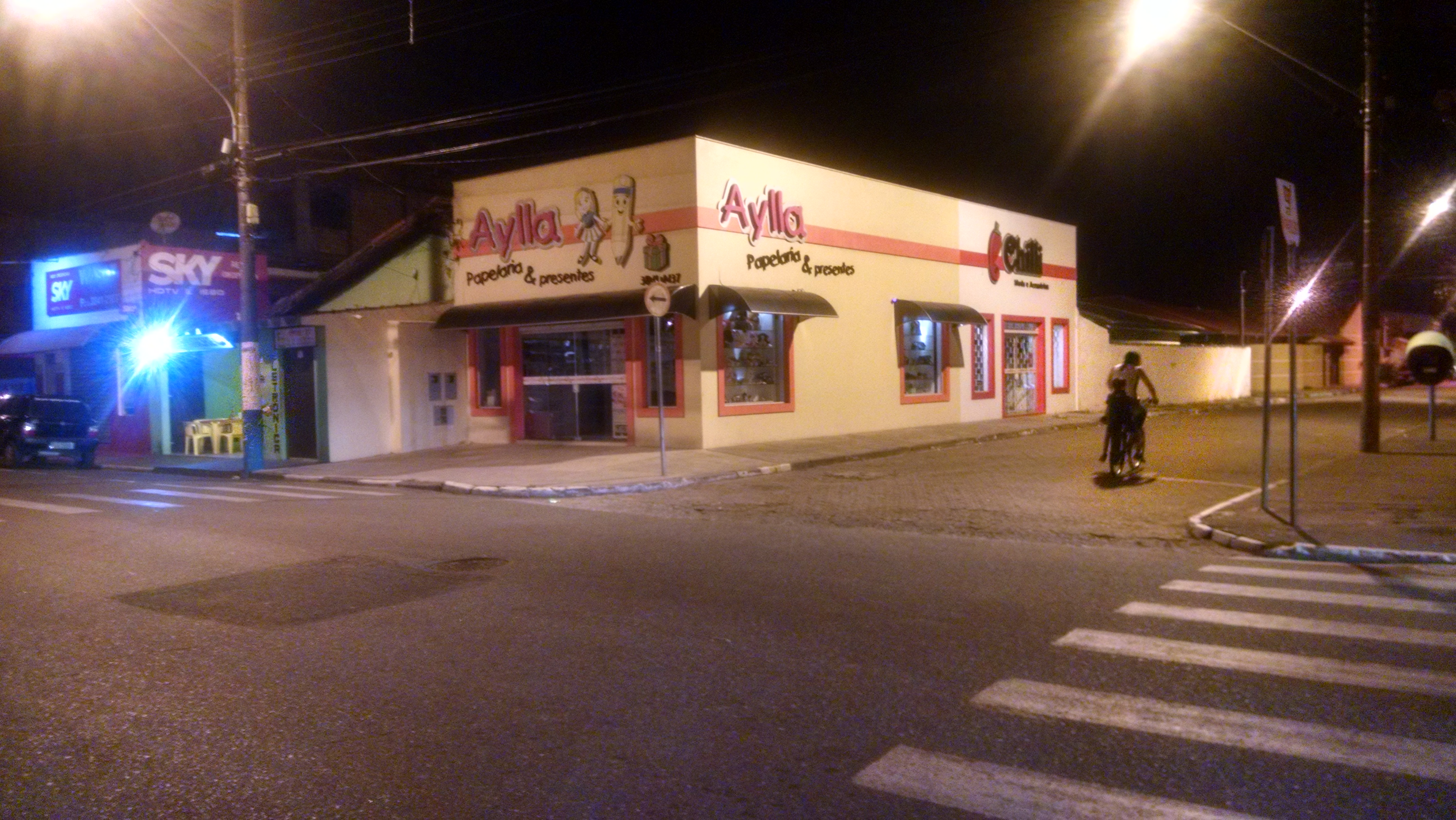
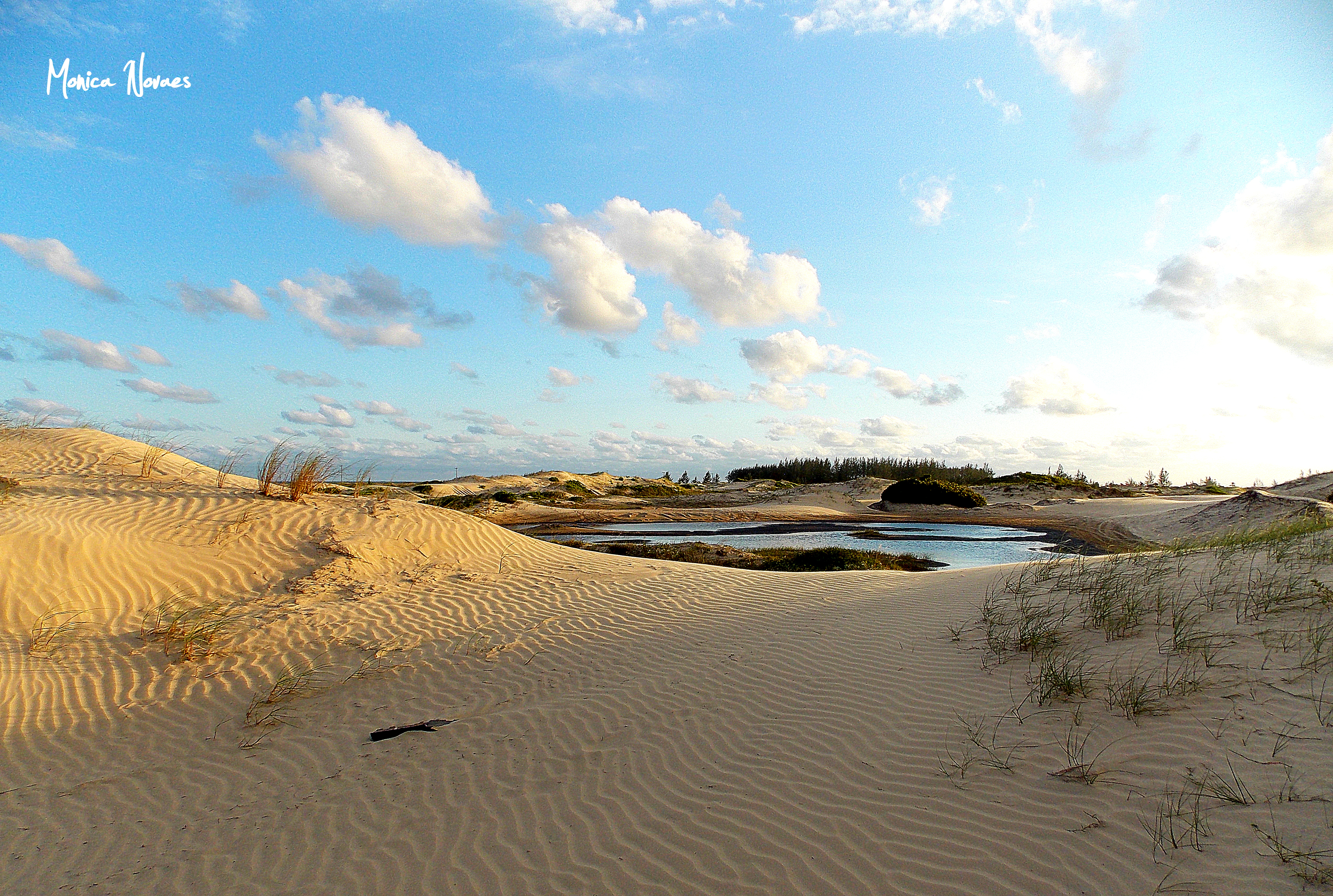
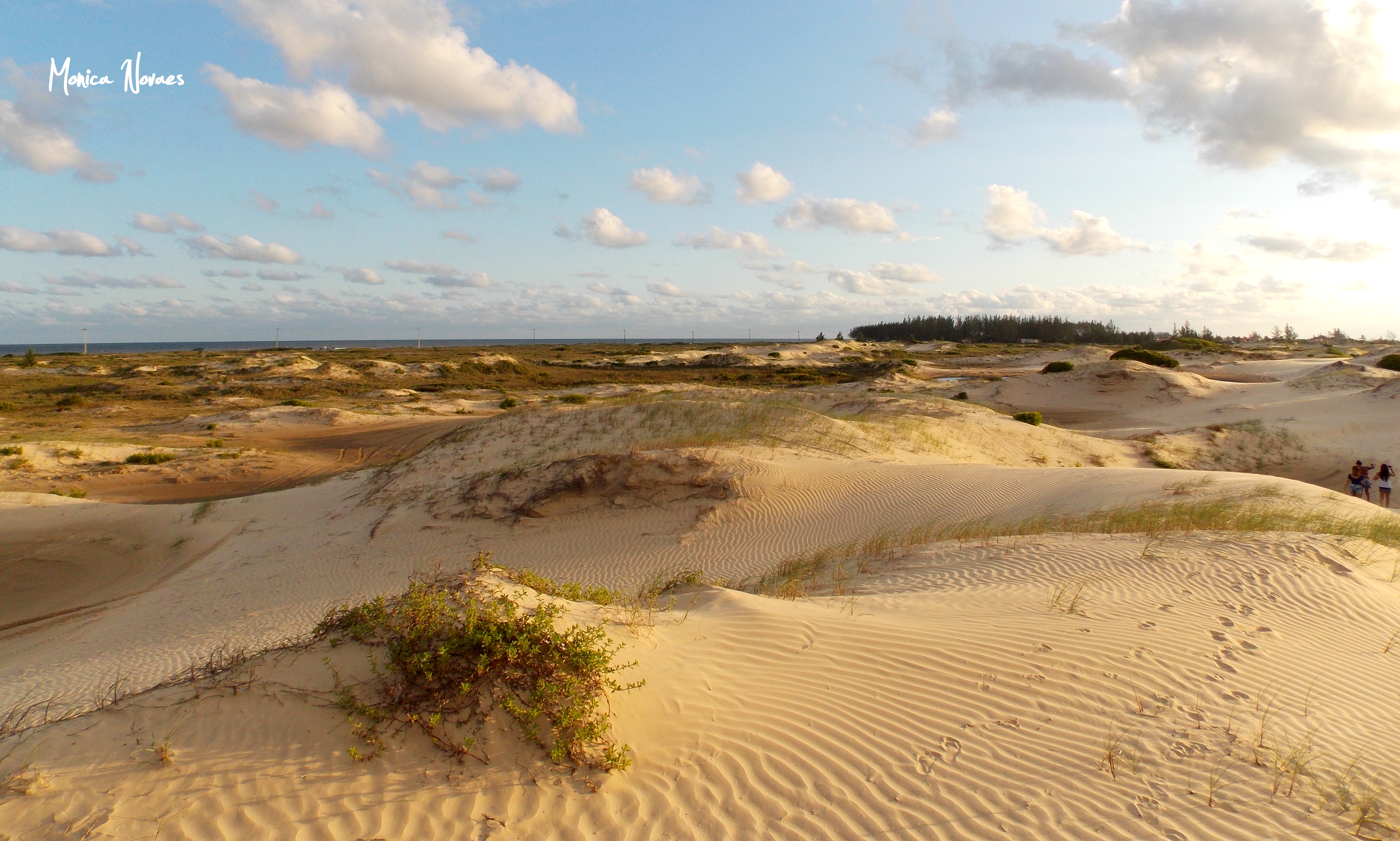
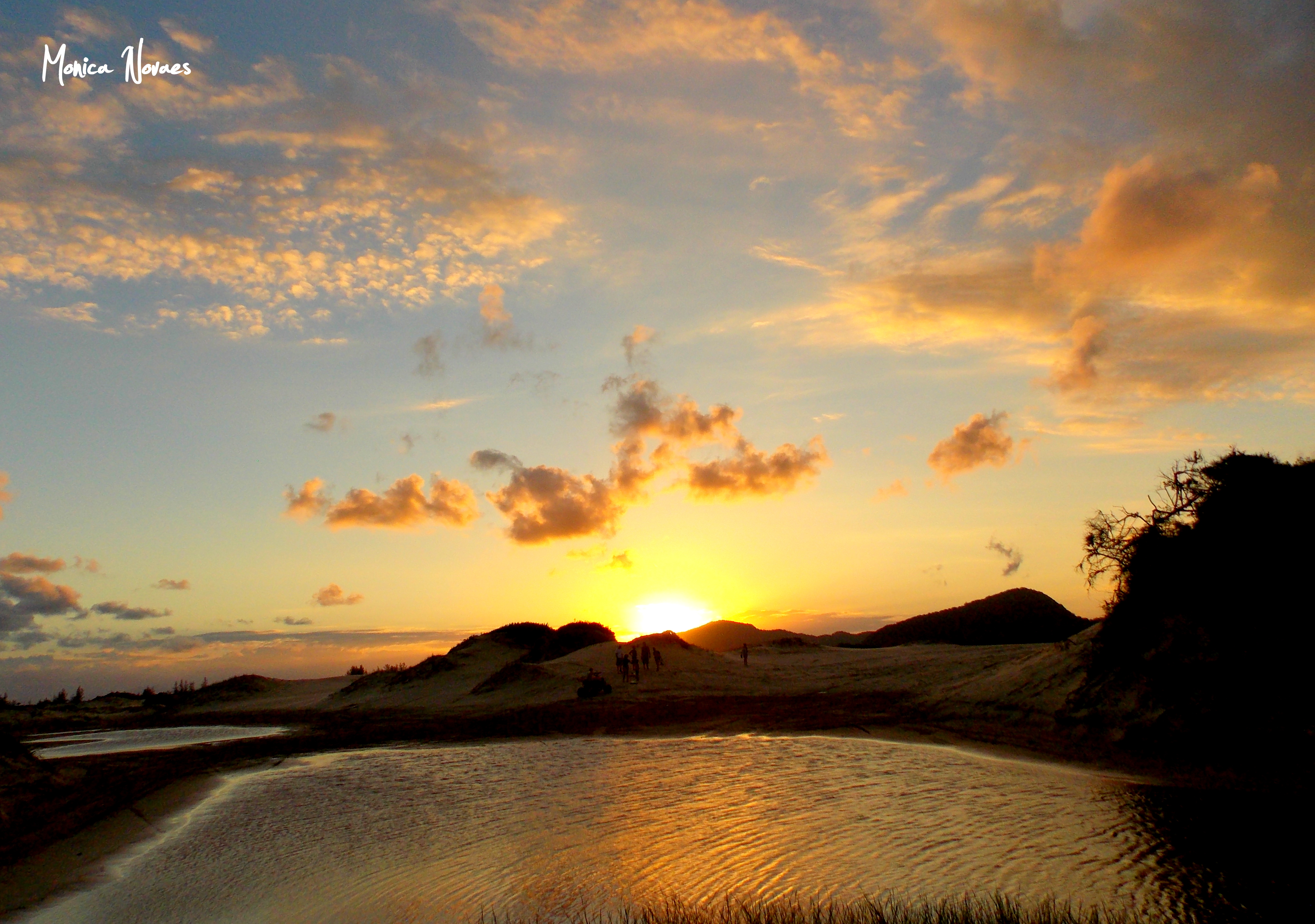
- From the top, from left to right: View of the horizon; panoramic view of part of the island; Boqueirão Sul beach; sunrise; local market; photos of the Araça Dunes in three different moments/angles.

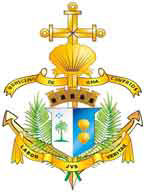
- Flag Coat of arms

- Location in São Paulo state

- Location in Brazil
- Coordinates: 24°44′28″S 47°32′24″W
- Country: Brazil
- Region: Southeast
- State: São Paulo

Area
  - Total: 196.567 km^{2} (75.895 sq mi)

Population (2022)
  - Total: 13,419
  - Density: 68.267/km^{2} (176.81/sq mi)
- Time zone: UTC−3 (BRT)

Ilha Comprida (Portuguese for "Long Island") is a municipality in the state of São Paulo in Brazil. Stretching southwest along the Atlantic coast of the state, it is coextensive with the barrier island of Ilha Comprida, the longest of its kind in the state (74 kilometres [46 mi]). The municipality was founded in 1993 after the merger of the parts of Ilha Comprida that belonged to the city of Cananéia with the sections of the island that were administered by the city of Iguape.

The Ilha Comprida has an average annual temperature of 24 °C. The population is 13,419 (2022) in an area of 196.567km^{2}. The island is covered by the Ilha Comprida Environmental Protection Area, which defines zoning and allowable land use in an effort to reduce environmental damage from human occupation. The municipality contains 55% of the 455-hectare (1,120-acre) Guará Area of Relevant Ecological Interest, created in 2008. It is part of the Iguape-Cananéia-Paranaguá estuary lagoon complex.

Due to its importance and because it is completely located in an environmental protection area, Ilha Comprida was declared a Biosphere Reserve by UNESCO. It preserves the last dunes in the state.

== Media ==
In telecommunications, the city was served by Telecomunicações de São Paulo. In July 1998, this company was acquired by Telefónica, which adopted the Vivo brand in 2012. The company is currently an operator of cell phones, fixed lines, internet (fiber optics/4G) and television (satellite and cable).

== See also ==
- List of municipalities in São Paulo
- Ilha do Mel
