= Voadeira =

Brazilian motorized watercraft

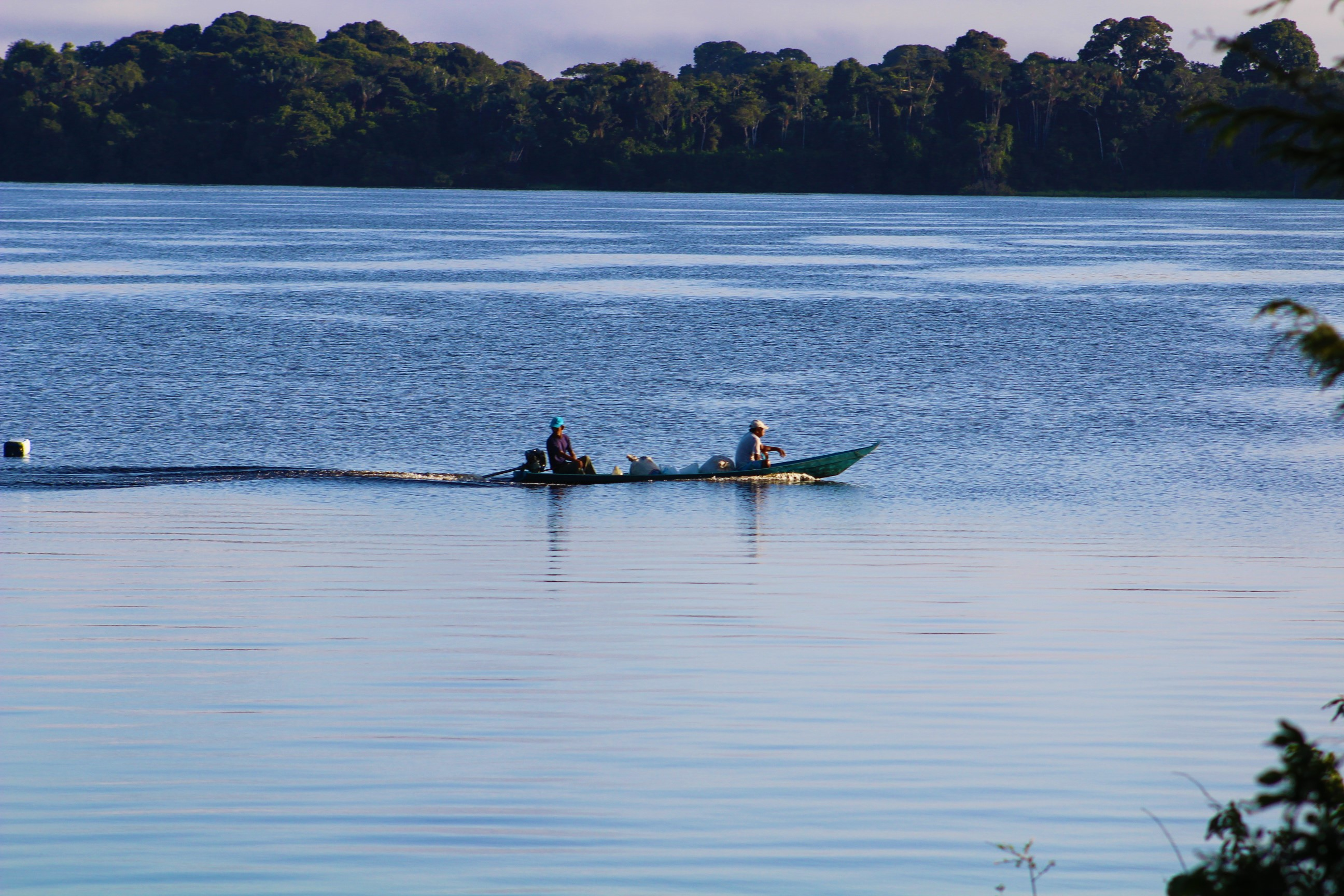
A Voadeira in Anavilhanas National Park

A voadeira is a type of motorized watercraft used mainly by indigenous and ribeirinho people on the Amazon River, Cerrado and Pantanal for fishing and transportation. It is typically made from aluminium with an outboard motor similar to a skiff.
