= Mandira Extractive Reserve =

Extractive reserve in São Paulo, Brazil

- Reserva Extrativista do Mandira
- IUCN category VI (protected area with sustainable use of natural resources)
- Location within Brazil
- Nearest city: Cananéia, São Paulo
- Coordinates: 25°01′07″S 48°01′36″W
- Area: 1,176 hectares (2,910 acres)
- Designation: Extractive reserve
- Created: 13 December 2002
- Administrator: Chico Mendes Institute for Biodiversity Conservation

The Mandira Extractive Reserve (Portuguese: Reserva Extrativista do Mandira) is an extractive reserve in the state of São Paulo, Brazil. It covers an area of mangroves. The main commercial product extracted by the traditional population is the oyster.

== Location ==
The Mandira Extractive Reserve is in the municipality of Cananéia, São Paulo. It has an area of 1,176 hectares (2,910 acres). It lies on the coast of the Mar Pequeno, and is partly contained in the Cananéia-Iguape-Peruíbe Environmental Protection Area. It is bounded to the north and west by the Lagamar de Cananéia State Park.

== Environment ==
The reserve covers an area of estuaries, mangroves, salt marsh and Atlantic forest in the estuarine-lagoon complex of Iguape and Cananéia. The highest point is no more than 5 metres (16 ft) above sea level. Temperatures range from 10 to 40 °C (50 to 104 °F), with an average OF 22 °C (72 °F). Average annual rainfall is 2,000 millimetres (79 in).

The reserve is in the Atlantic forest domain. Vegetation is 95% mangroves and 5% litoral forest and salt marshes with shrubby vegetation. The mangrove vegetation includes Rhizophora mangle, Laguncularia racemosa, Avicennia shaeuriana and Spartina alterniflora. The narrow strip of land along the border of the reserve contains Calophyllum brasiliense, Rheedia brasiliensis, Syagrus romanzoffiana, Bactris setosa, Ilex thuzans, Dalbergia nigra, Eugenia myrtifolia, Ocotea aciphylla and Chrysophyllum brasiliense.

== History ==
The reserve was created to meet the needs of the traditional quilombo population of the Bairro Mandira lagoon area in Cananéia. This population migrated from an economy based mainly on forest extraction and traditional farming to one based on using the lagoon resources for sale, particularly native oysters, but also including crabs, fish and other seafood. The region is in the Iguape-Cananéia-Paranaguá estuary lagoon complex.

The Mandira Extractive Reserve was created by presidential decree on 13 December 2002. It is administered by the Chico Mendes Institute for Biodiversity Conservation (ICMBio). It is classed as IUCN protected area category VI (protected area with sustainable use of natural resources). An extractive reserve is an area used by traditional extractive populations whose livelihood is based on extraction, subsistence agriculture and small-scale animal raising. Its basic objectives are to protect the livelihoods and culture of these people and to ensure sustainable use of natural resources. Implementation of the reserve was a highly positive example of sustainable development. With greater recognition and help in marketing, the people of the reserve are proud of their environmental conservation work and the quality of their products, and are seen as leaders in the region.

The deliberative council was created on 6 November 2006. A decree of 19 November 2010 confirmed the right of the traditional extractive communities to use the reserve. On 22 November 2010 ICMBio granted this right to the reserve's quilombo community association (Associação da Comunidade Remanescente de Quilombo da Reserva Extrativista do Mandira). The management plan was approved on 25 February 2011. The beneficiary profile was approved on 28 January 2016.

The reserve is part of the Lagamar mosaic of conservation units of the south coast of São Paulo and the coast of Paraná.

== Sources ==
- Brown, Jessica; Mitchell, Nora J.; Beresford, Michael (2005), The Protected Landscape Approach: Linking Nature, Culture and Community, IUCN, ISBN 978-2-8317-0797-6
- Resex Mandira (in Portuguese), ICMBio: Chico Mendes Institute for Biodiversity Conservation
- RESEX do Mandira (in Portuguese), ISA: Instituto Socioambiental
- Unidade de Conservação: Reserva Extrativista Mandira (in Portuguese), MMA: Ministério do Meio Ambiente
- Unidades de Conservação - Mosaico do Litoral Sul de São Paulo e do Litoral do Paraná - LAGAMAR (in Portuguese), ICMBio, archived from the original on 2019-05-27
