= Ribeirinhos =

Traditional river dwelling people

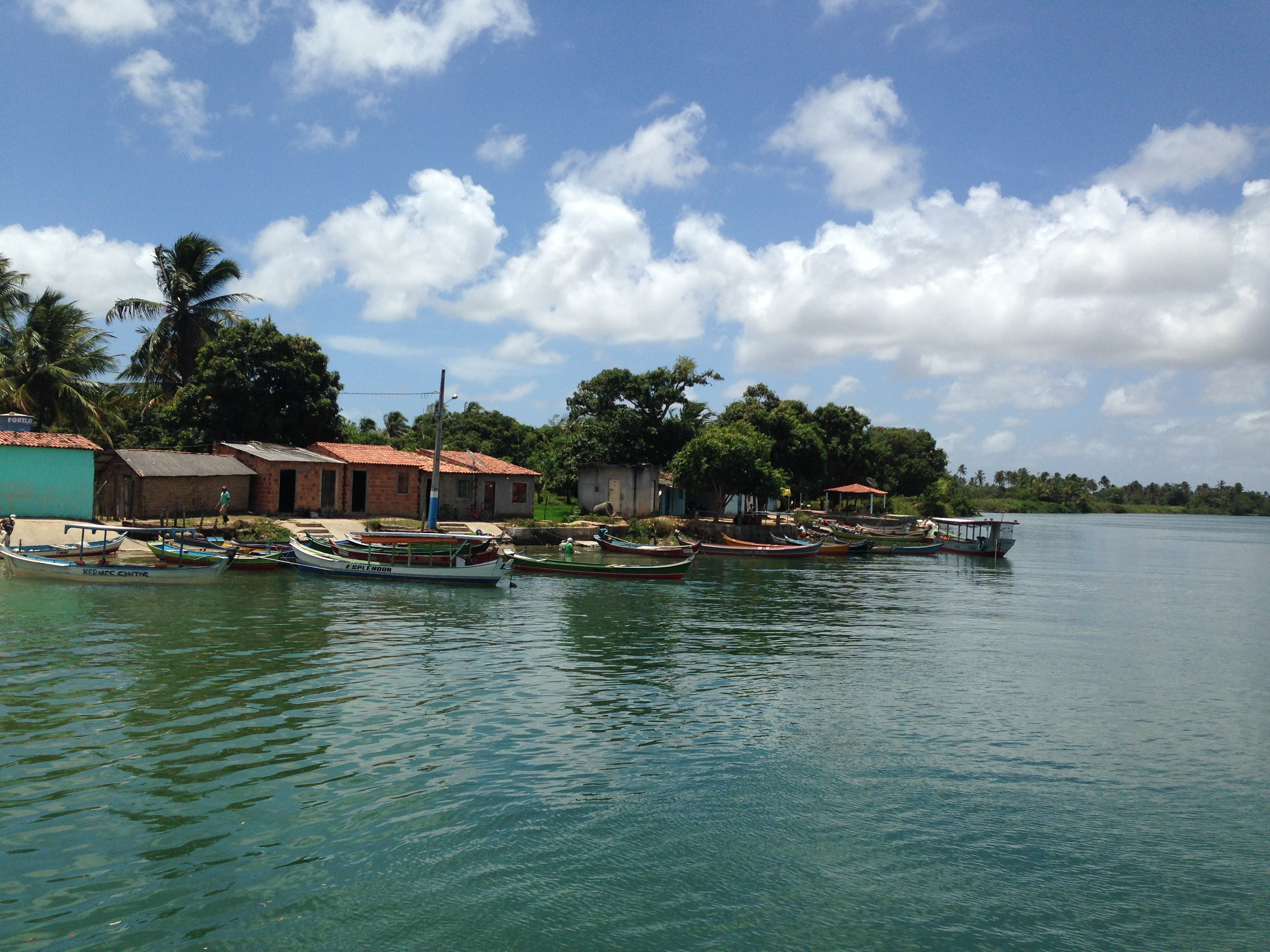
- Ribeirinho dwellings

Total population
- 7,105,000 (2020)

Regions with significant populations
- Brazil

Languages
- Portuguese

The ribeirinhos are a traditional rural population in the Amazon rainforest, who live near rivers. Their main activities are fishing and farming on a small scale, for their own use. They usually live in pile dwellings and travel by motor boats called voadeiras.

Anthropologist Charles Wagley described the ribeirinhos in terms of their high state of adaptation to their tropical riverine environment, pointing to the continuity between indigenous groups and ribeirinhos with regard to agricultural techniques and knowledge of the forest.

It is believed Ribeirinho people migrated to the Amazon riverbanks when rubber industry collapsed. Living in stilt homes they have been guardians of the river’s diversity, yet they struggle to access enough employment, medical or dental care, and clean drinking water, so children under five often die from water-born diseases.

== See also ==
- Cholos pescadores
- Montubio
- Caiçaras
- Indigenous peoples in Brazil
