= Ilha do Tumba Extractive Reserve =

Protected area in São Paulo, Brazil

- Reserva Extrativista Ilha do Tumba
- IUCN category VI (protected area with sustainable use of natural resources)
- Location within Brazil
- Nearest city: Cananéia, São Paulo
- Coordinates: 25.202986°S 48.008046°W
- Area: 1,128 hectares (2,790 acres)
- Designation: Extractive reserve
- Created: 21 February 2008
- Administrator: Fundação Florestal SP

The Ilha do Tumba Extractive Reserve (Portuguese: Reserva Extrativista Ilha do Tumba) is an extractive reserve in the state of São Paulo, Brazil. It protects an area of mangroves and supports a traditional extractive population.

== Location ==
The Ilha do Tumba Extractive Reserve is in the municipality of Cananéia, São Paulo. It has an area of 1,128 hectares (2,790 acres). The reserve is on the border between the states of São Paulo and Paraná. It adjoins the Itapanhapima Sustainable Development Reserve to the east. The reserve contains a well-preserved area of mangroves, and holds sambaquis that are among the oldest archaeological sites on the south coast. It has the objective of conserving this area of the Lagamar and supporting crab collection and fishing by the local communities. It also provides the raw material used to make fish traps, an economically important traditional caiçara technique.

== History ==
The Ilha do Tumba Extractive Reserve was created by state law 12.810 of 21 February 2008. This law broke up the old Jacupiranga State Park and created the Jacupiranga Mosaic with 14 conservation units. It is administered by the state forestry foundation (Fundação para Conservação e a Produção Florestal do Estado de São Paulo).

== Sources ==
- Reserva Extrativista – Resex – Conceito (in Portuguese), Fundação Florestal
- RESEX da Ilha do Tumba (in Portuguese), ISA: Instituto Socioambiental
- RESEX Ilha do Tumba (in Portuguese), WWF Brasil, archived from the original on 2016-11-26
- Silva, André Luiz Ferreira da (October 2010), Reservas de Desenvolvimento Sustentável (RDS) e Reservas Extrativistas (RESEX) no Vale do Ribeira: Inovação ou Outra Forma de Fazer as Mesmas Coisas em Territórios Tradicionais no Estado de São Paulo? (PDF) (in Portuguese), Florianópolis: Universidade de São Paulo, archived from the original (PDF) on 2010-11-26
- Zanchetta, Inês; Bedeschi, Luciana (28 February 2008), Mosaico do Jacupiranga, no Vale do Ribeira, agora é lei (in Portuguese), ISA: Instituto Socioambiental, archived from the original on 2016-11-21
