= Ilha do Cardoso =

Coordinates: 25°7′54″S 47°57′59″W

Cardoso Island is an island belonging to the city of Cananéia, São Paulo, Brazil. It is the southernmost point of the state of São Paulo, near the border with the state of Paraná. The island is protected by the Cardoso island State Park (Portuguese: Parque Estadual da Ilha do Cardoso), which protects the Atlantic Forest biome.
