= Itapanhapima Sustainable Development Reserve =

Nature reserve in Brazil

- Reserva de Desenvolvimento Sustentável de Itapanhapima
- IUCN category VI (protected area with sustainable use of natural resources)
- Location within Brazil
- Nearest city: Cananéia, São Paulo
- Coordinates: 25.121966°S 48.029417°W
- Area: 1,243 hectares (3,070 acres)
- Designation: Sustainable development reserve
- Created: 21 February 2008
- Administrator: Fundação Florestal SP

The Itapanhapima Sustainable Development Reserve (Portuguese: Reserva de Desenvolvimento Sustentável de Itapanhapima) is a sustainable development reserve in the state of São Paulo, Brazil. It protects an area of mangrove forests and supports a traditional extractive population.

== Location ==
The Itapanhapima Sustainable Development Reserve is in the municipality of Cananéia, São Paulo. It has an area of 1,243 hectares (3,070 acres). It adjoins the Ilha do Tumba Extractive Reserve to the west. It supports the artisanal fishermen of the area. The reserve is in the Cananéia lagoon estuary, an important nursery for fish and aquatic mammals. It contains large mangrove swamps managed by the traditional populations of the reserve and used by some families for extraction of the native oyster and uçá crab.

== History ==
The Itapanhapima Sustainable Development Reserve was created by state law 12.810 of 21 February 2008. This law broke up the old Jacupiranga State Park and created the Jacupiranga Mosaic with 14 conservation units. It is administered by the state forest foundation (Fundação para Conservação e a Produção Florestal do Estado de São Paulo).

== Sources ==
- RDS de Itapanhapima (in Portuguese), ISA: Instituto Socioambiental
- RDS Itapanhapima (in Portuguese), WWF Brasil, archived from the original on 2016-11-26
- Reserva de Desenvolvimento Sustentável – RDS – Estaduais (in Portuguese), Fundação Florestal SP
- Silva, André Luiz Ferreira da (October 2010), Reservas de Desenvolvimento Sustentável (RDS) e Reservas Extrativistas (RESEX) no Vale do Ribeira: Inovação ou Outra Forma de Fazer as Mesmas Coisas em Territórios Tradicionais no Estado de São Paulo? (PDF) (in Portuguese), Florianópolis: Universidade de São Paulo, archived from the original (PDF) on 2010-11-26
- Zanchetta, Inês; Bedeschi, Luciana (28 February 2008), Mosaico do Jacupiranga, no Vale do Ribeira, agora é lei (in Portuguese), ISA: Instituto Socioambiental, archived from the original on 2016-11-21
