= Guará Area of Relevant Ecological Interest =

Protected area in São Paulo, Brazil

- Área de Relevante Interesse Ecológico do Guará
- IUCN category IV (habitat/species management area)
- Location within Brazil
- Nearest city: Ilha Comprida, São Paulo
- Coordinates: 24.686019°S 47.439493°W
- Area: 455 hectares (1,120 acres)
- Designation: Area of relevant ecological interest
- Created: 8 October 2008
- Administrator: Fundação Florestal SP

The Guará Area of Relevant Ecological Interest (Portuguese: Área de Relevante Interesse Ecológico do Guará) is an area of relevant ecological interest in the state of São Paulo, Brazil.

== Location ==
The Guará Area of Relevant Ecological Interest (ARIE) is divided between the municipalities of Iguape ( 44.89%) and Ilha Comprida (55.11%) in the state of São Paulo. It has an area of 455 hectares (1,120 acres). It covers the northwestern tip of the island of Ilha Comprida.

== History ==
The Guará Area of Relevant Ecological Interest was created by decree 53527 of 8 October 2008, which also created the Litoral Sul Marine Environmental Protection Area. The two were to have the same management council, which was established on 19 December 2008. The ARIE is administered by the São Paulo Forestry Foundation (Fundação para Conservação e a Produção Florestal do Estado de São Paulo).

A company was hired in 2013 to prepare a management plan for São Paulo's three marine environmental protection areas (south, center and north) and the ARIE, but the work was not completed. In August 2016 a fresh start on a management plan was made by the Ekos Institute.

== Sources ==
- "APA Marinha do Litoral Sul", Navegacao de Esporte e Recreio (in Portuguese)
- ARIE do Guará (in Portuguese), WWF Brasil
- ARIE Guará (ARIE) (in Portuguese), ISA: Instituto Socioambiental
- Conselho da APA Marina do Litoral Sul e ARIE do Guará (in Portuguese), Associação Rede Cananéia, 7 August 2016
