= Cananéia =

Municipality in São Paulo, Brazil

- Municipality
- Municipality of Cananéia
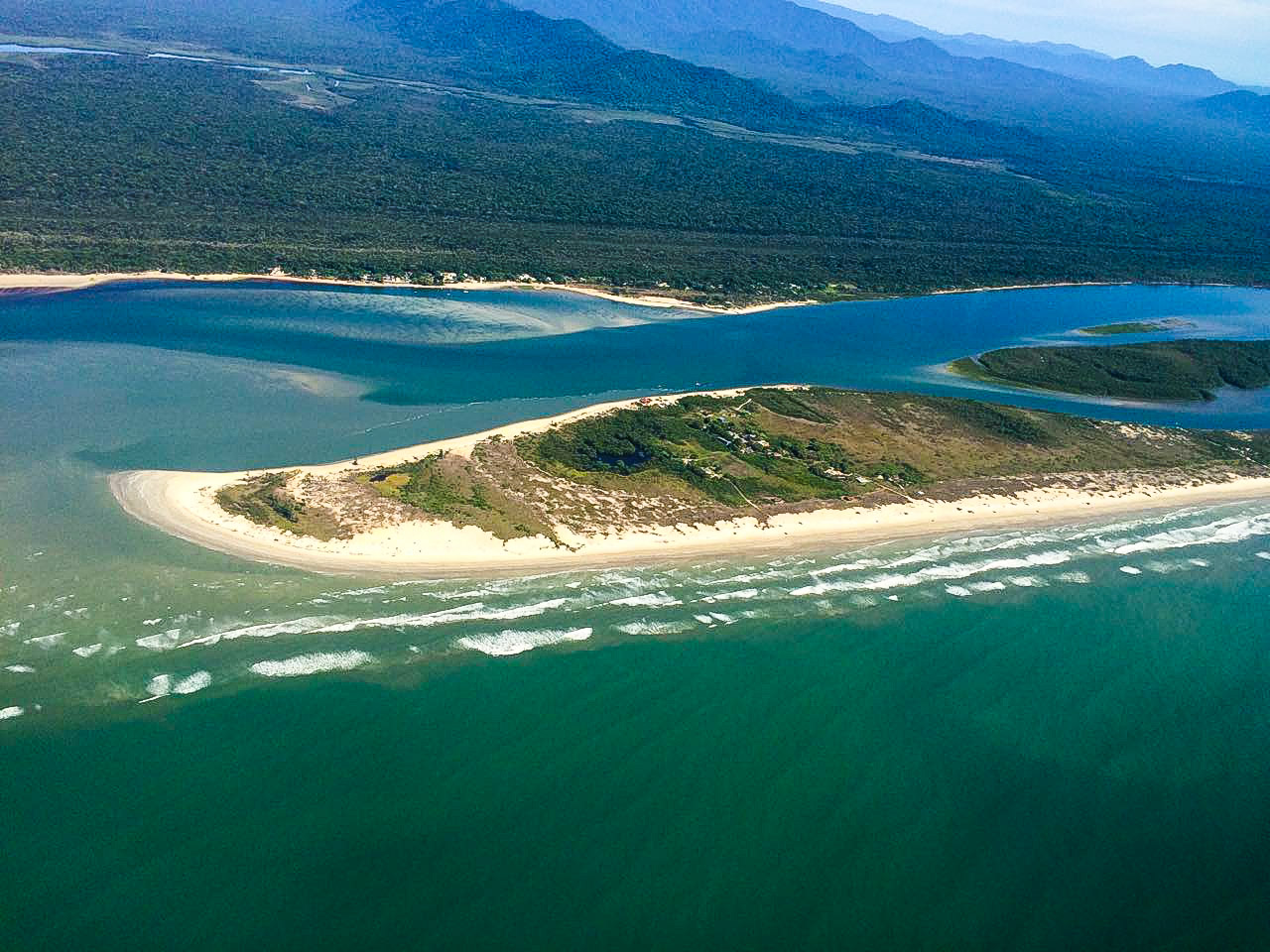
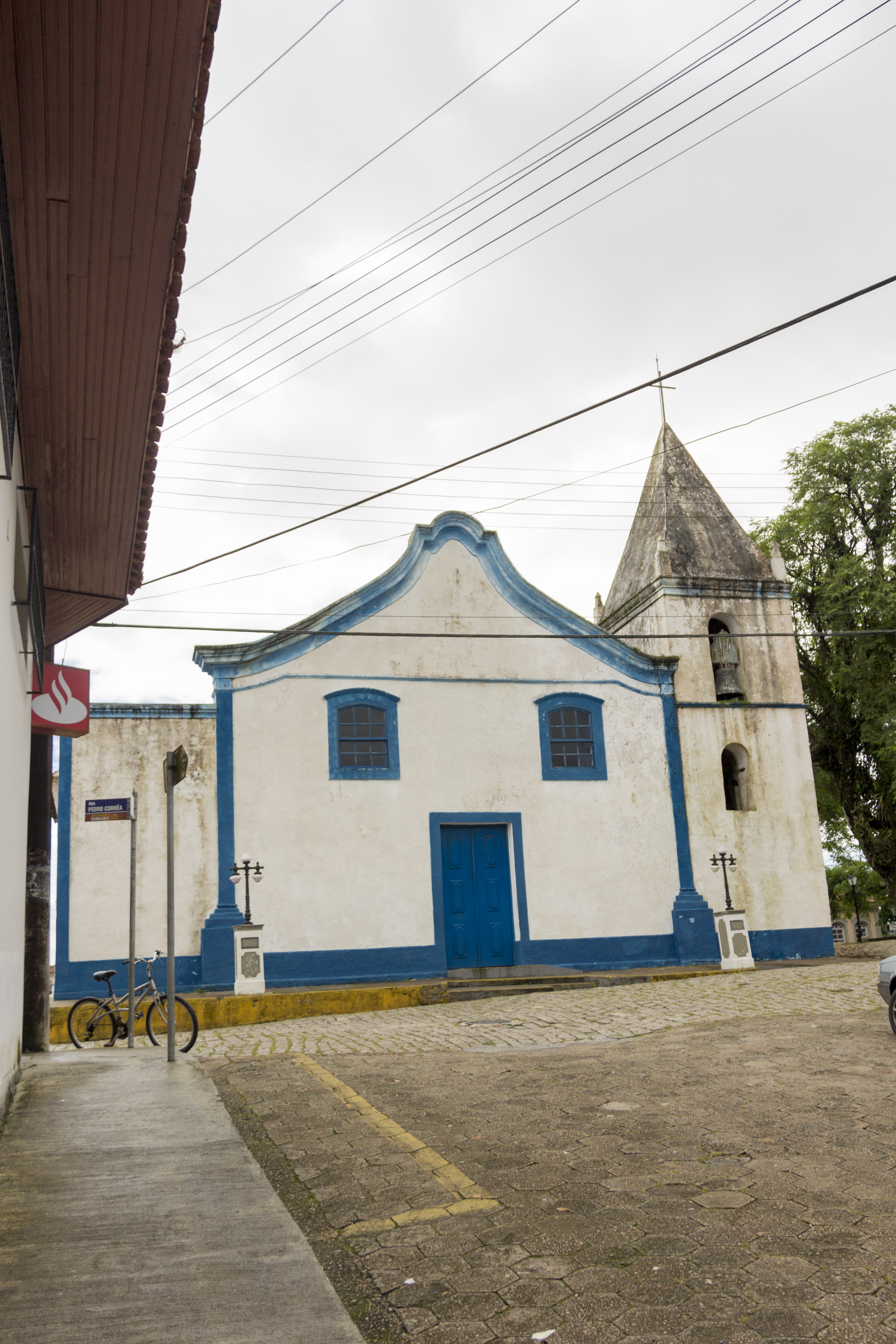
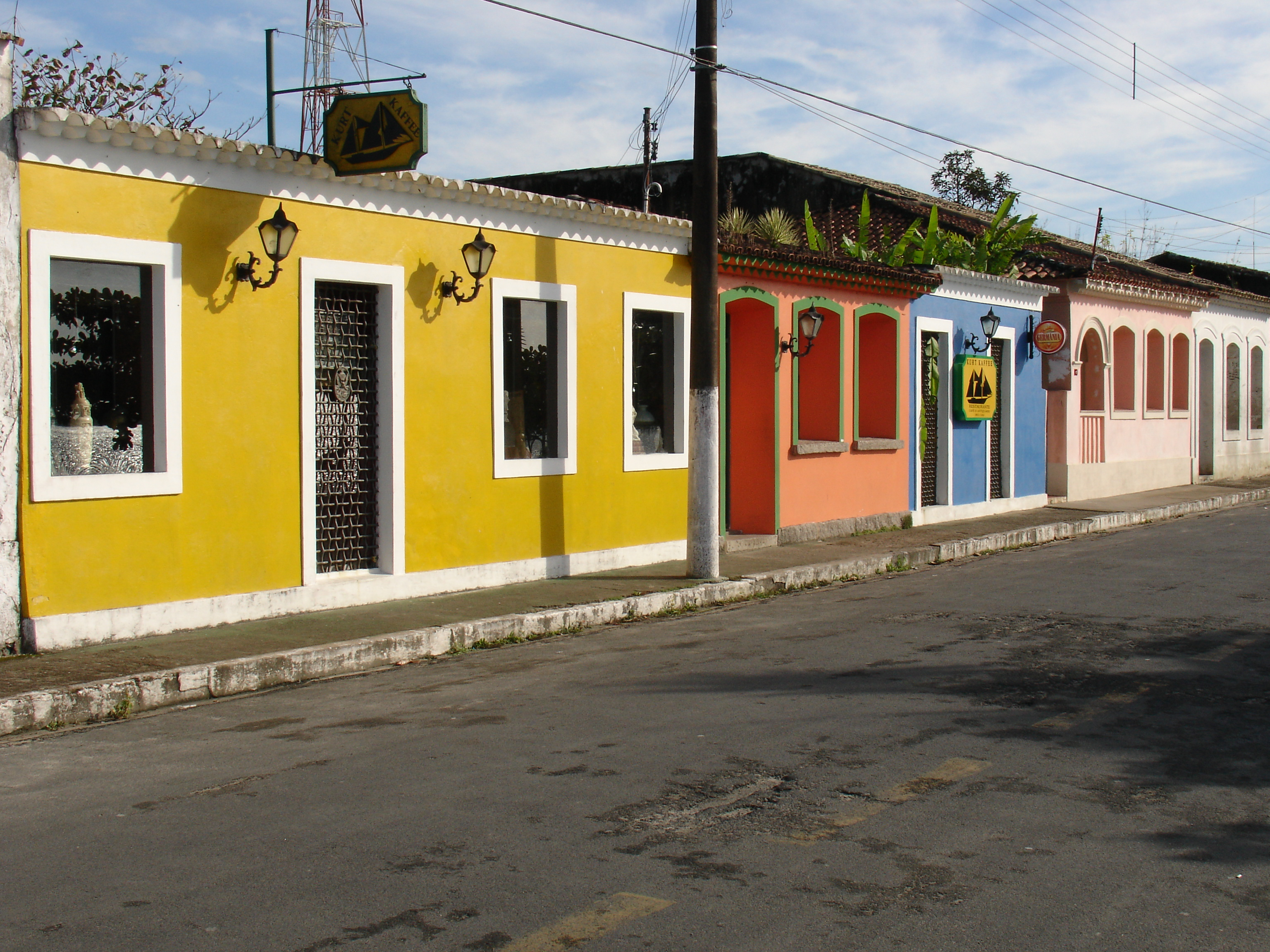
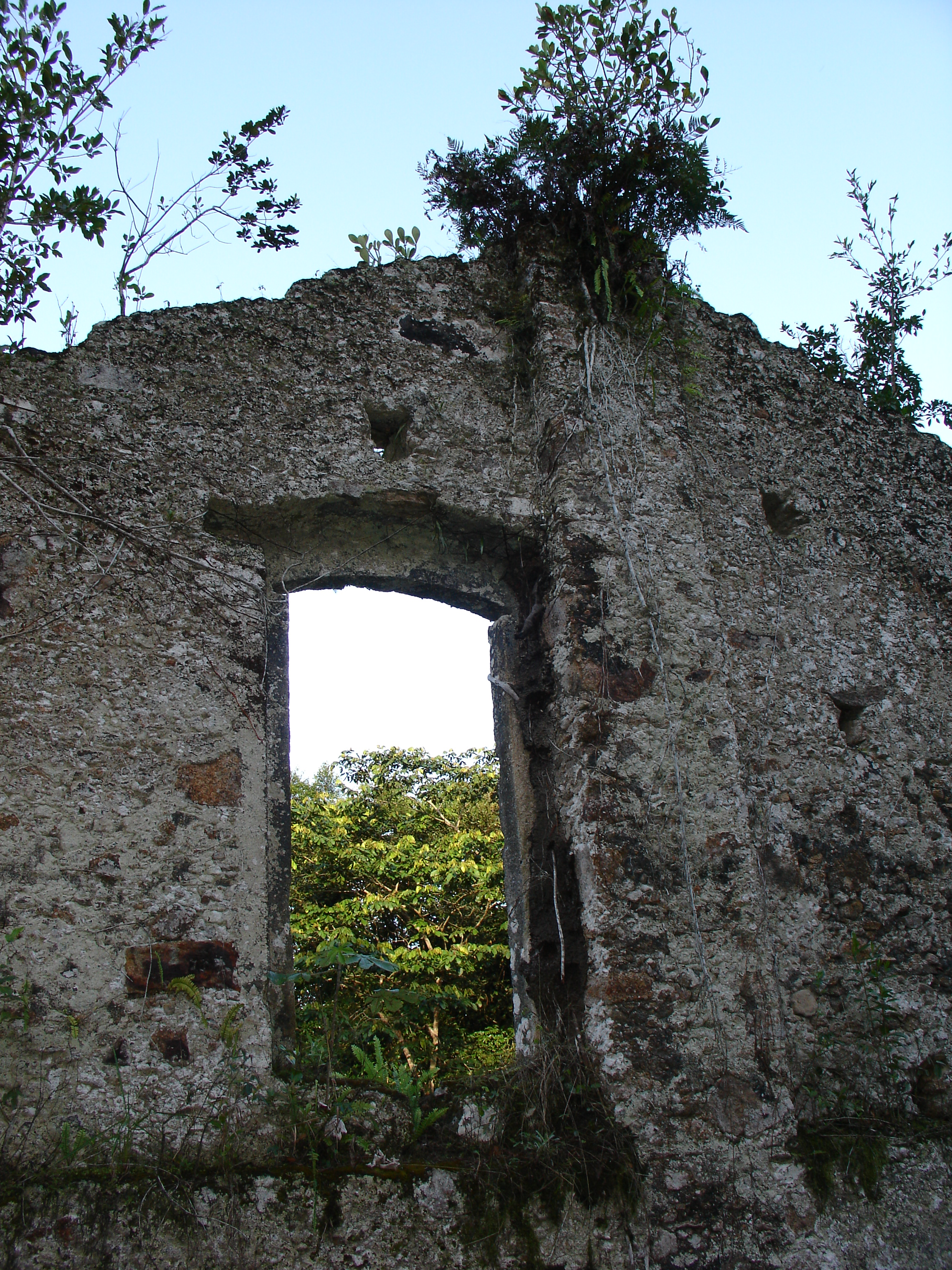
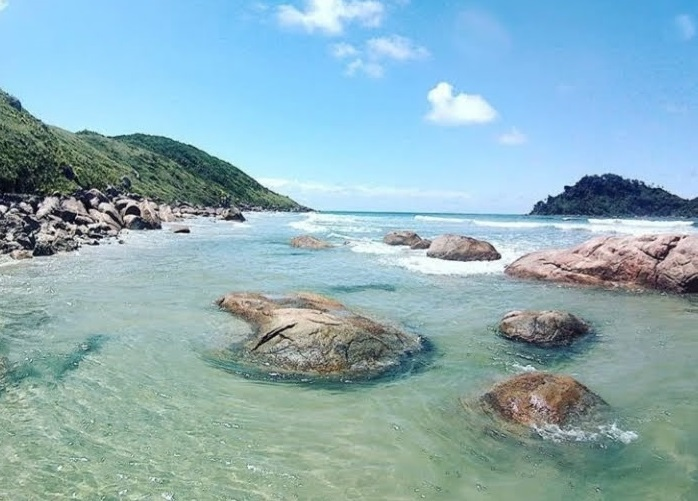
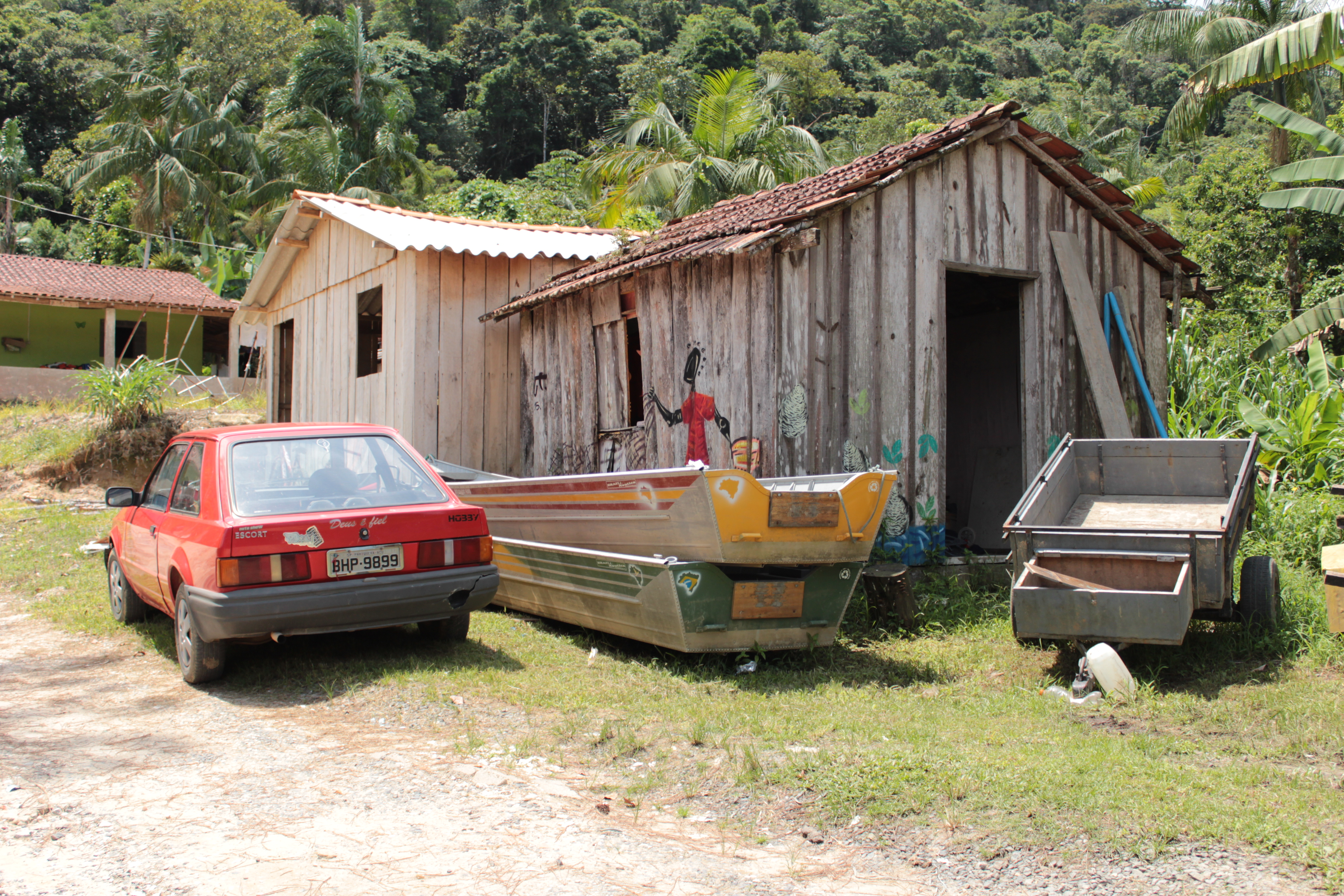
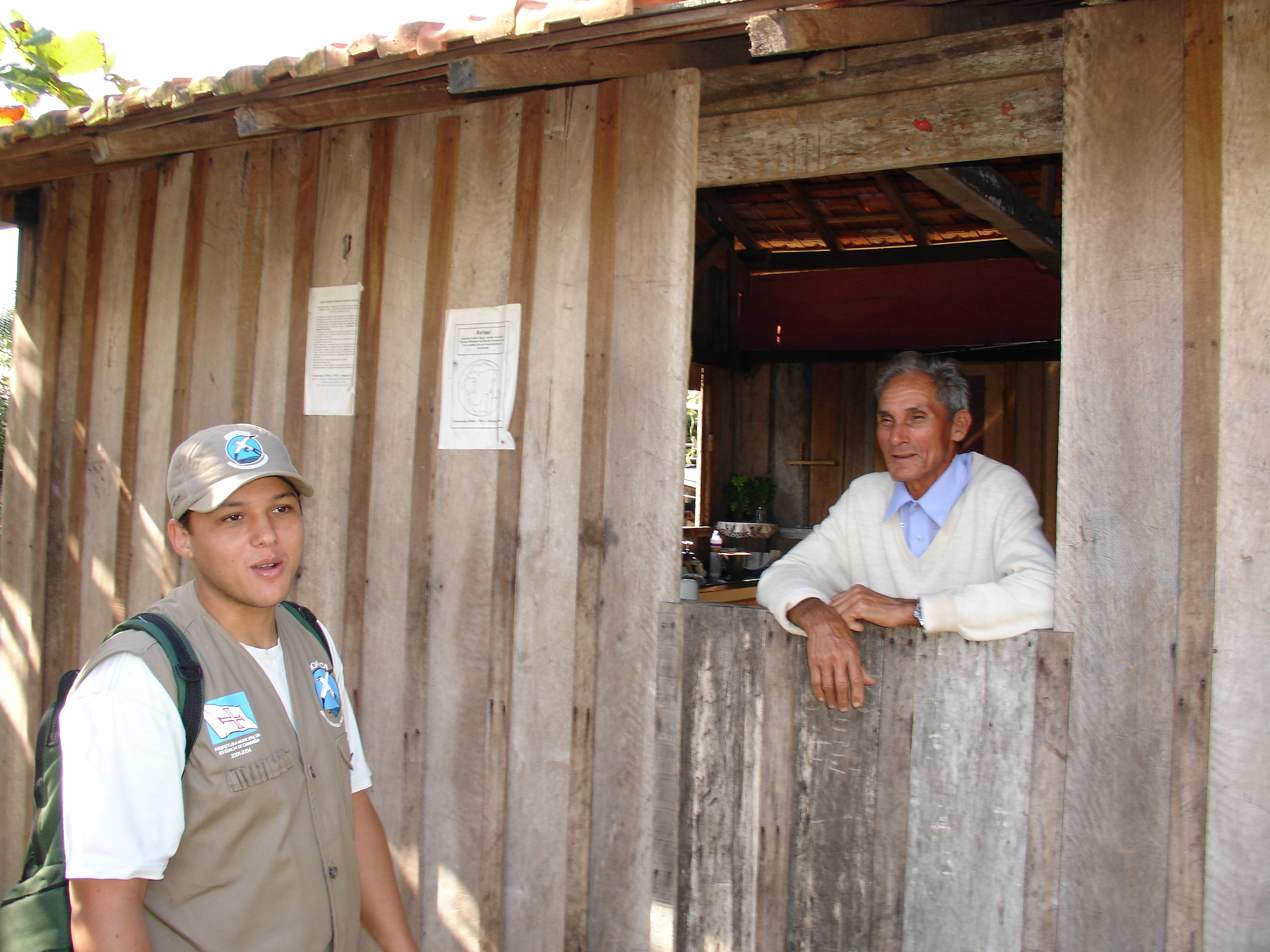
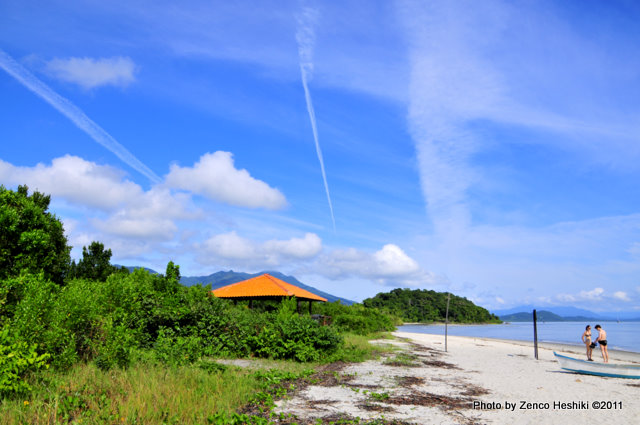
- Aerial view of Ariri Mother Church Historic Center Stone House Ilha do Cardoso State Park Mandira Quilombola Community Caiçara Community in Ilha do Cardoso Beach at the Ilha do Cardoso

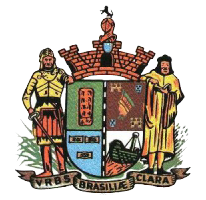
- Flag Coat of arms

- Location in São Paulo
- Coordinates: 25°00′53″S 47°55′36″W
- Country: Brazil
- Region: Southeast
- State: São Paulo
- Founded: 12 August 1531

Government
  - Mayor: Gabriel Guimarães (GUIMA) (PV)

Area
  - Total: 1,242.010 km^{2} (479.543 sq mi)
- Elevation: 8 m (26 ft)

Population (2020)
  - Total: 12,541
  - Density: 11.4/km^{2} (30/sq mi)
- Time zone: UTC−3 (BRT)
- HDI (2010): 0.720 – high
- Website: Official website

Cananéia is the southernmost city in the state of São Paulo, Brazil, near where the Tordesilhas Line passed. The population in 2020 was 12,541 and its area is 1,242.010 km^{2} (479.543 sq mi). The elevation is 8 m. The city of Cananéia is host to the Dr. João de Paiva Carvalho research base belonging to the Oceanographic Institute of the University of São Paulo.

Cananéia is considered by some Portuguese and Spanish historians to be the oldest city in Brazil, five months before the founding of São Vicente, but due to the lack of official documentation proving this fact, São Vicente is officially the oldest city in Brazil. The Historic Center of Cananéia, listed by CONDEPHAAT, still preserves the architectural styles adopted by the first houses and churches from the colonial period until the end of the 19th century. The beaches also attract thousands of people in high season, and Ilha do Cardoso has several trails and waterfalls, as well as several archaeological sites. Festivals, cuisine and handicrafts are also attractions apart from the city, whose main sources of income are fishing and tourism.

Due to its natural beauty and rich ecosystem, it is listed as a Natural Heritage Site by UNESCO.

== History ==
Founded in 1531, Cananéia is considered by some to be the oldest city in Brazil (5 months before the foundation of São Vicente) but due to the lack of official documentation proving this fact, São Vicente is officially the oldest city in Brazil. The historic center of Cananéia still preserves the architectural styles adopted by the first houses from the colonial period to the end of the 19th century.

== Conservation ==
The municipality contains the 13,500-hectare (33,000-acre) Ilha do Cardoso State Park, created in 1962. It contains part of the Tupiniquins Ecological Station. It contains the 1,176-hectare (2,910-acre) Mandira Extractive Reserve, established in 2002. The municipality contains the 1,662-hectare (4,110-acre) Taquari Extractive Reserve, created in 2008. It contains the 1,128-hectare (2,790-acre) Ilha do Tumba Extractive Reserve, also created in 2008. It contains the 1,243-hectare (3,070-acre) Itapanhapima Sustainable Development Reserve, created at the same time.

== Media ==
In telecommunications, the city was served by Companhia de Telecomunicações do Estado de São Paulo until 1975, when it began to be served by Telecomunicações de São Paulo. In July 1998, this company was acquired by Telefónica, which adopted the Vivo brand in 2012.

The company is currently an operator of cell phones, fixed lines, internet (fiber optics/4G) and television (satellite and cable).

== See also ==
- List of municipalities in São Paulo
