= Immediate Geographic Region of Curvelo =

Urban administrative region in Minas Gerais, Brazil

The Immediate Geographic Region of Curvelo, in the state of Minas Gerais, Brazil.

The Immediate Geographic Region of Curvelo is one of the 10 immediate geographic regions in the Intermediate Geographic Region of Belo Horizonte, one of the 70 immediate geographic regions in the Brazilian state of Minas Gerais and one of the 509 of Brazil, created by the National Institute of Geography and Statistics (IBGE) in 2017.

== Municipalities ==
It comprises 11 municipalities:

- Augusto de Lima
- Buenópolis
- Corinto
- Curvelo
- Felixlândia
- Inimutaba
- Monjolos
- Morro da Garça
- Presidente Juscelino
- Santo Hipólito
- Três Marias
