= Inimutaba =

Human settlement in Brazil

Coordinates: 18°43′44″S 44°21′39″W

- Municipality
- Interactive map of Inimutaba
- Country: Brazil
- State: Minas Gerais
- Region: Southeast

Population (2022 Census)
  - Total: 7,371
  - Estimate (2025): 7,615
- Time zone: UTC−3 (BRT)

Location of Inimutaba in the state of Minas Gerais

Inimutaba is a Brazilian municipality located in the northeast of the state of Minas Gerais. Its population as of 2025 was 7,615 living in a total area of 527 km^{2}. The city belongs to the statistical mesoregion of Central Mineira and to the statistical microregion of Curvelo. It became a municipality in 1962.

== Geography ==
Inimutaba is located at an elevation of 630 meters on highway BR-259 (Felixlândia to Diamantina). The nearest major population center is Curvelo.

The distance to Curvelo is 6 km; and the distance to the state capital, Belo Horizonte, is 175 km. Neighboring municipalities are: Curvelo and Presidente Juscelino.

== History ==
Inimutaba began in the nineteenth century with the construction of a textile factory called Fiação e Tecelagem Cedro e Cachoeira. The name of the town is derived from this industry as it means "village of weavers" in the indigenous language. In the early nineties the factory closed and the town went through a period of economic depression.

== Economy ==
The main economic activities are services, small industries, and agriculture. The production of charcoal from eucalyptus plantations is also important. The GDP in 2005 was R$29 million, with 15 million from services, 6 million from industry, and 5 million from agriculture. There were 222 rural producers on 19,000 hectares of land. Only 40 farms had tractors (2006). Approximately 1,700 persons were dependent on agriculture. The main crops were sugarcane, beans, and corn. There were 19,000 head of cattle (2006). There were no banks (2007) and 382 automobiles (353 motorcycles), giving a ratio of 17 inhabitants per automobile.

== Health and education ==
There were 2 health clinics in 2005. Patients with more serious health conditions are transported to Belo Horizonte or Curvelo. Educational needs were met by 7 primary schools, 1 middle schools, and 4 pre-primary schools.

== Statistics ==
- Municipal Human Development Index: 0.691 (2000)
- State ranking: 583 out of 853 municipalities as of 2000
- National ranking: 3,134 out of 5,138 municipalities as of 2000
- Literacy rate: 82%
- Life expectancy: 66 (average of males and females)

In 2000 the per capita income of R$124.00 was well below the state and national average of R$276.00 and R$297.00 respectively.

== See also ==
- List of municipalities in Minas Gerais
