= Santo Hipólito =

Municipality in the state of Minas Gerais, Brazil

Coordinates: 18°17′49″S 44°13′22″W

- Municipality
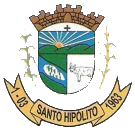
- Coat of arms
- Interactive map of Santo Hipólito
- Country: Brazil
- State: Minas Gerais
- Region: Southeast

Population (2022 Census)
  - Total: 2,717
  - Estimate (2025): 2,692
- Time zone: UTC−3 (BRT)

Location of Santo Hipólito in the state of Minas Gerais

Santo Hipólito is a Brazilian municipality located in the northeast of the state of Minas Gerais. Its population as of 2025 was 2,692 living in a total area of 430 km^{2}. The city belongs to the statistical mesoregion of Central Mineira and to the statistical microregion of Curvelo. It became a municipality in 1962.

Santo Hipólito is located at an elevation of 596 meters, 30 km. east of Corinto on the right bank of the Rio das Velhas. The distance to the state capital, Belo Horizonte, is 241 km. Neighboring municipalities are: Monjolos, Presidente Juscelino, Curvelo and Augusto de Lima.

The main economic activities are services, small industries, and agriculture. The production of charcoal from eucalyptus plantations is also important. The GDP in 2005 was R$23 million, with 9 million from services, 1 million from industry, and 12 million from agriculture. There were 187 rural producers on 34,000 hectares of land. Only 35 farms had tractors (2006). Approximately 600 persons were dependent on agriculture. The main crops were sugarcane, beans and corn. There were 24,000 head of cattle (2006). There were no banks (2007) and 78 automobiles (137 motorcycles), giving a ratio of 40 inhabitants per automobile.

There were 2 health clinics. Patients with more serious health conditions are transported to Curvelo. Educational needs were met by 8 primary schools, 1 middle school, and 2 pre-primary schools.

- Municipal Human Development Index: 0.670 (2000)
- State ranking: 669 out of 853 municipalities as of 2000
- National ranking: 3,451 out of 5,138 municipalities as of 2000
- Literacy rate: 76%
- Life expectancy: 66 (average of males and females)

In 2000 the per capita income of R$111.00 was well below the state and national average of R$276.00 and R$297.00 respectively.

The highest ranking municipality in Minas Gerais in 2000 was Poços de Caldas with 0.841, while the lowest was Setubinha with 0.568. Nationally the highest was São Caetano do Sul in São Paulo with 0.919, while the lowest was Setubinha. In more recent statistics (considering 5,507 municipalities) Manari in the state of Pernambuco has the lowest rating in the country—0,467—putting it in last place.

== See also ==
- List of municipalities in Minas Gerais
