= Escola Base case =

1994 journalistic scandal in Brazil

Headline of the sensationalist tabloid Notícias Populares which read: "Kombi was a love hotel in the sex school".

The Escola Base case was an episode of miscarriage of justice and press sensationalism that took place in 1994 in São Paulo, Brazil. The episode consisted of the unjust accusation of six individuals of sexual abuse against four-year-old children at the Escola de Educação Infantil Base, located in the Aclimação neighborhood. The hasty media coverage and questionable investigative conduct resulted in the destruction of the accused individuals' reputations, who were later acquitted months afterward due to an absolute lack of evidence. The case is regarded in Brazil as "a symbol of journalistic error".

== The case ==
In September 1992, Maria Aparecida Shimada, her husband Icushiro Shimada, her cousin Paula Milhim de Monteiro Alvarenga, and Paula's husband Maurício de Monteiro Alvarenga decided to acquire a small, run-down private school located in the Aclimação neighborhood of São Paulo. Maria Aparecida assumed responsibility for the administrative side, while Paula took charge of the pedagogical aspects. Icushiro assisted his wife with the children's dismissal routine, and Maurício was responsible for transporting the children using his Kombi van. Together, they raised funds to rebuild the school, transforming it into a two-story townhouse and constructing external restrooms. The final renovations were completed in early 1994, and the number of students jumped from 17 to 72.

In mid-1994, Fábio, a four-year-old boy who attended the school, began making movements resembling sexual acts while playing with his mother, Lúcia Eiko Tanoue. Reacting hysterically, the mother started questioning him about where he had learned such movements. Fábio allegedly told her that he had seen such actions on a pornographic tape kept at the home of Rodrigo, a classmate, and that he had been taken there in a van driven by Icushiro, the husband of the school's owner. Fábio also claimed that he had been taken to a house where he had participated in an orgy with a woman of Asian features and with his female schoolmates.

Faced with such a vivid imagination, Lúcia sought out Cléa Parente de Carvalho, mother of Cibele—one of the classmates who allegedly participated in the orgy—and, after extensive questioning, they concluded that the children had suffered sexual abuse. The mothers then filed a complaint of sexual abuse against the school owners, a school transport driver, and the parents of a student. In response, the delegate who received the report, Antonino Primante, referred the two children for a forensic examination at the Legal Medical Institute (IML), and also issued a search and seizure warrant to enter the home of Mara and Saulo, Rodrigo's parents, where the orgies were supposedly taking place. Upon entering the home of Mara and Saulo, they found that nothing matched the description provided by the children; nothing was found, except for cassette tapes of the singer Fábio Jr. and of the television program Globo Repórter on the subject of ufology. Shortly thereafter, they proceeded to the Escola Base, which was surrounded by journalists and outraged parents. After searching the entire school, the only item seized was a collection of Walt Disney tapes.

Unconvinced by Delegate Primante's conduct, the mothers decided to bring the case to Rede Globo. Reporter Valmir Salaro arrived at the police station and informally interrogated the accused. On March 29, 1994, Jornal Nacional broadcast the mothers' allegations without presenting any version from the accused. In addition to Rede Globo, other media outlets covered the case, such as Folha de S.Paulo and the French newspaper France-Soir. The persecution of the accused intensified when the preliminary results from the IML were released, indicating the possible occurrence of lewd acts. Following numerous newspaper reports claiming that the school owners drugged the children, photographed them naked, and committed other perversions, the Escola Base was vandalized, and the owners went into hiding to avoid being lynched. Amidst the unfounded accusations, vandalism, and looting, the accused agreed to speak with journalists Florestan Jr., Chico Verani, and Regina Terraz. Days later, Delegate Edélson Lemos met with the defense lawyers and requested the accused's presence for questioning, assuring they would not be arrested. Contrary to this guarantee, Judge Galvão Bruno ordered their pretrial detention. Only Saulo and Mara appeared at the police station and were arrested; the others managed to evade custody.

On that same day, the press obtained the inconclusive forensic report from the IML regarding Fábio, which stated that the lesions found could be attributed either to anal intercourse or to intestinal problems—the latter being confirmed some time later through a statement by Fábio's own mother, who affirmed that her son suffered from constipation. Days later, Mara and Saulo were released, and Delegate Edélson Lemos, who had carried out the arrests, was removed from the case, with the investigations subsequently being kept under seal. Months later, Delegate Gélson de Carvalho concluded that all six individuals under investigation were innocent due to a lack of evidence, and the inquiry was subsequently archived.

== Aftermath ==
The six accused developed serious health problems after the case. Icushiro Shimada suffered a heart attack and died in 2014; his wife Maria Aparecida died of cancer in 2007. Paula was never able to work as a teacher again and divorced Maurício. Saulo and Mara Nunes faced social ostracism and financial ruin.

The six accused filed civil lawsuits for moral damages against the State of São Paulo and several media outlets that had broadcast sensationalist and unverified reports. The State was condemned to pay R$250,000 to each of the main plaintiffs. Media groups such as Folha de S.Paulo, O Estado de S. Paulo, Rede Globo, and SBT were also ordered to pay compensation, with values varying from R$100,000 to over R$1 million per plaintiff in different rulings. In 2014, the Superior Court of Justice (STJ) reduced the SBT's indemnity from R$300,000 to R$100,000 for each of the three plaintiffs, arguing the initial sum was excessive, especially considering the State was considered the direct cause of the damage.

In 2022, Globoplay released the documentary Escola Base – Um Repórter Enfrenta o Passado, in which reporter Valmir Salaro reencounters the accused 28 years later. In 2023, Ricardo Shimada, son of Icushiro and Maria Aparecida Shimada, together with journalist Emílio Coutinho, published the book O Filho da Injustiça ("The Son of Injustice"), in which the son of the former school owners presents his version of the events.
