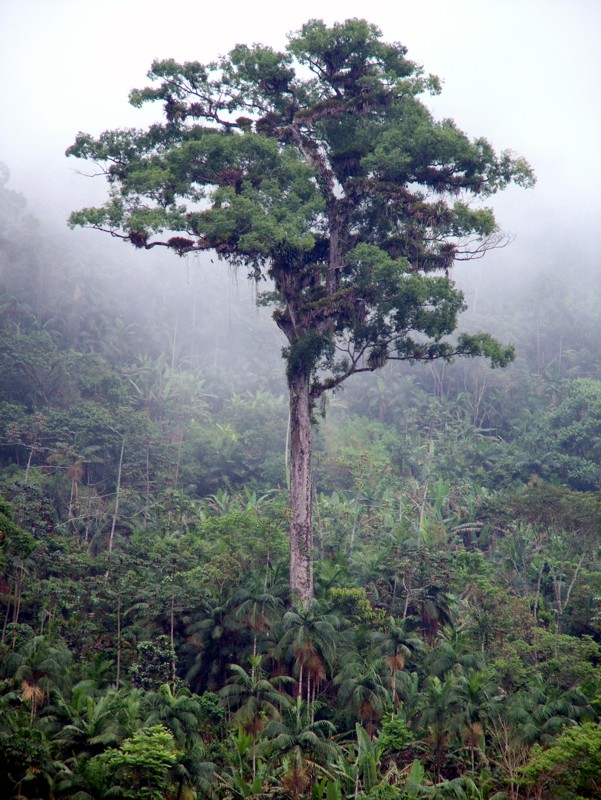

Conservation status
- Vulnerable (IUCN 2.3)

Scientific classification
- Kingdom: Plantae
- Clade: Tracheophytes
- Clade: Angiosperms
- Clade: Eudicots
- Clade: Asterids
- Order: Ericales
- Family: Lecythidaceae
- Genus: Cariniana
- Species: C. legalis

Binomial name
- Cariniana legalis (Martius) Kuntze

= Cariniana legalis =

Species of flowering plant

Cariniana legalis is a species of emergent rainforest tree in the Monkeypot family Lecythidaceae. It is found in the Atlantic forest of south-eastern Brazil, where is known as jequitibá-branco or jequitibá-rosa, and possibly found in Colombia, and Venezuela. These trees can be very large. A C. legalis measured by botanical explorer David Fairchild was 62 feet (19 meters) in circumference with no buttresses at six feet (two meters) above ground.

It is one of the biggest trees in the Atlantic Forest. There are some old trees in Santa Rita do Passa Quatro, João Neiva and near Petrópolis. One of these trees is more than 3 000 years old.

It is threatened by habitat loss.

== Gallery ==
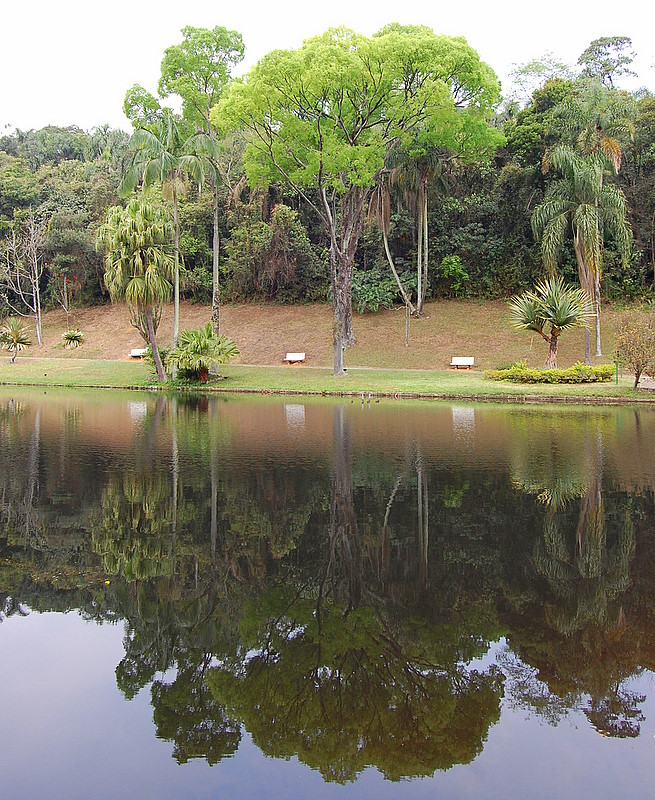
Jequitibá-rosa in the Botanical Garden of São Paulo.

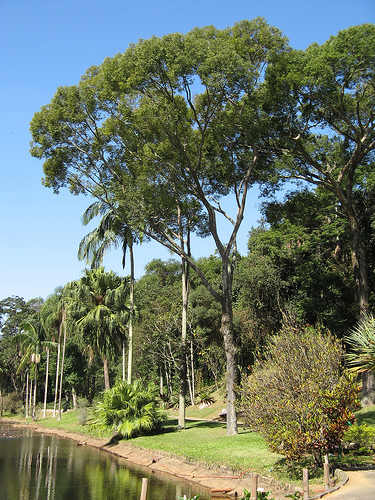
Same tree, from another angle.

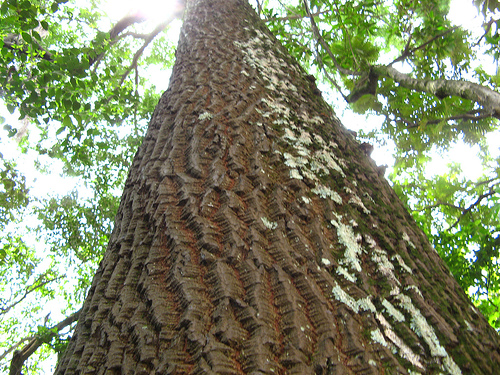
Jequitibá-rosa in the Aclimação Park, São Paulo.

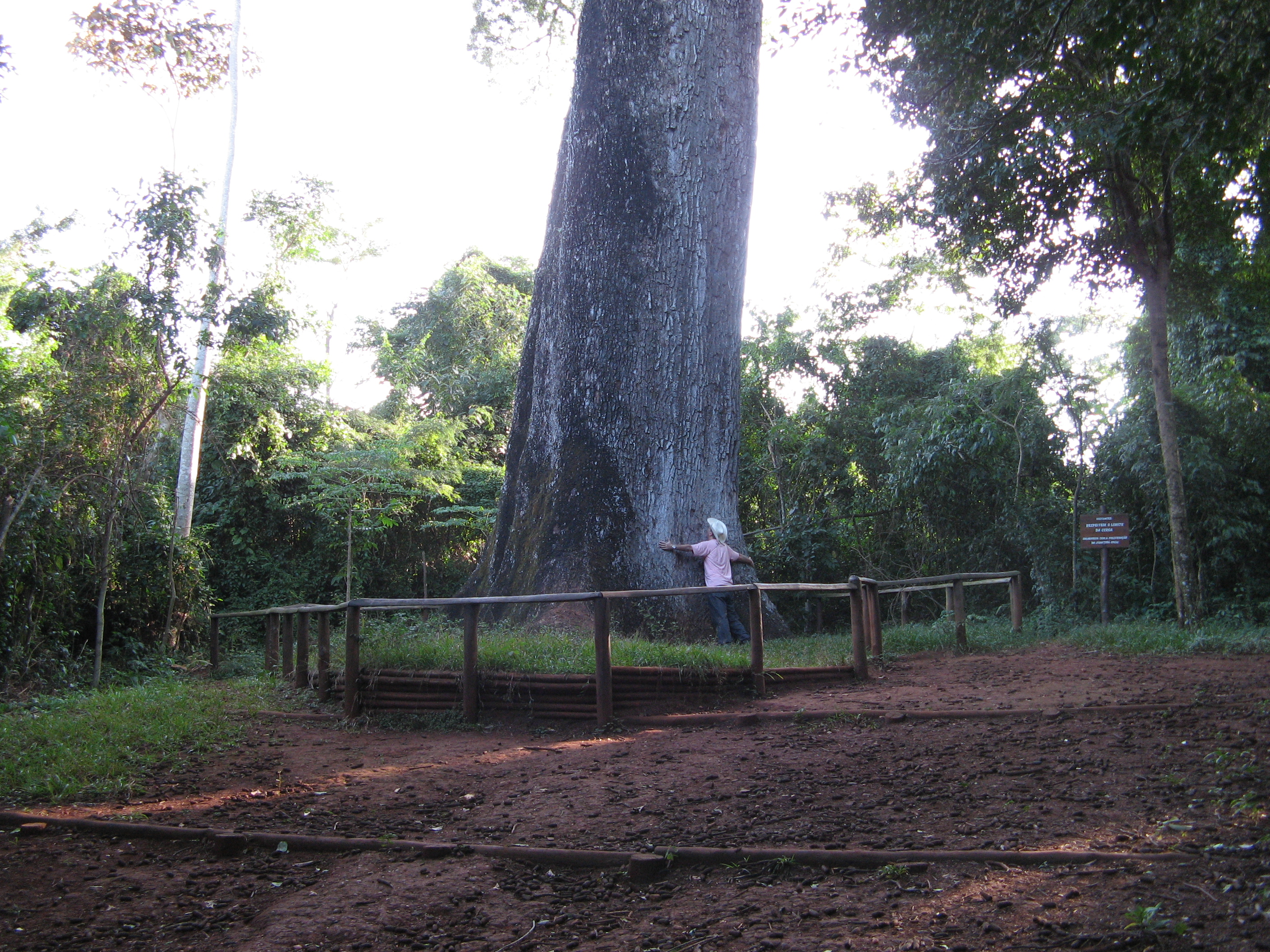
Giant Jequitibá-rosa estimated to be 3000 years old, in the Vassununga State Park, Santa Rita do Passa Quatro.

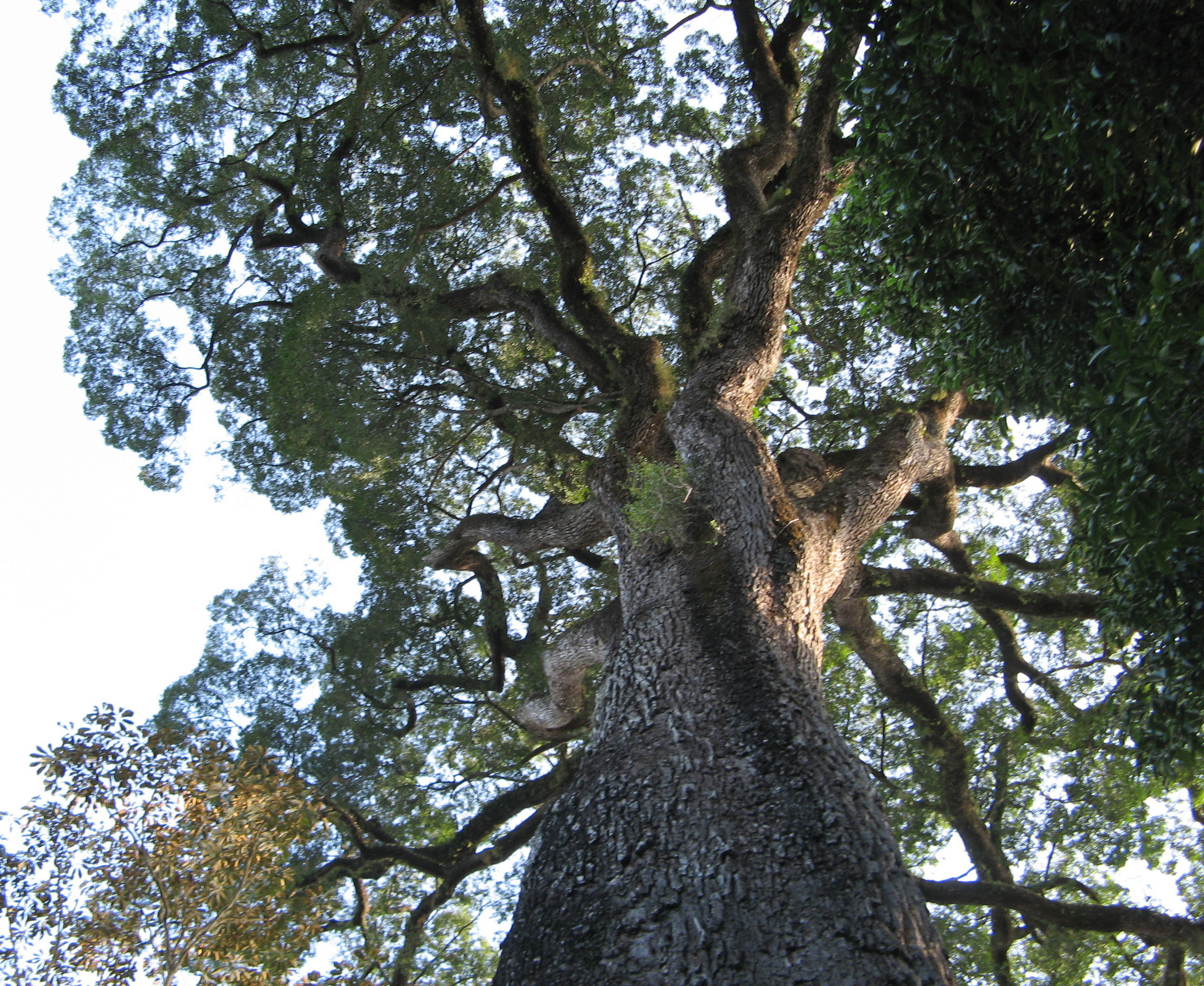
Canopy of the same tree in Vassununga State Park.
