= Devil Baby =

1975 hoax in Brazil

Part of the front page of Notícias Populares from May 11, 1975, the first to report the devil baby. On the cover, one reads "The Devil Was Born in São Paulo" and "baby with horns, tail, and speaking."

The Devil Baby (Portuguese: Bebê Diabo) was the subject of multiple fabricated news reports published by the Brazilian newspaper Notícias Populares between May and June 1975. According to the periodical, a "devil baby" had allegedly been born at a maternity hospital in São Bernardo do Campo. The coverage of the incident resulted in a significant increase in newspaper sales. The episode is regarded as one of the most remarkable events in the history of Notícias Populares and has been examined in books and academic articles.

== Context ==
The periodical Notícias Populares had already acquired notoriety for its excessively sensationalist reporting. Its readership consisted chiefly of individuals from modest socioeconomic strata, who demonstrated a greater propensity toward believing in supernatural folklore. Months earlier, the newspaper had already published stories concerning the "ghost blonde" and the "vampire of Osasco". In May 1975, reporter Marco Antônio Montandon, affiliated with Folha de S.Paulo — the newspaper responsible for Notícias Populares — traveled to the Greater ABC region to verify reports that a child had been born at a hospital in São Bernardo do Campo presenting "two protrusions on the forehead" and "an elongation of the coccyx". These anomalies were subsequently identified as minor congenital malformations, which were corrected through a brief surgical procedure. Montandon thereafter converted the account into a fictional horror chronicle published in Folha. However, José Luiz Proença, news editor of Notícias Populares, and Lázaro Campos Borges, police editor, summoned a reporter to "repurpose" the text and transform it into a news piece reporting the birth of a "devil baby".

== History and content ==
The first report on the devil baby was published in the edition of May 11, 1975, Mother's Day, featuring the headline "The Devil Was Born in São Paulo" in large type. The article claimed that an "incredibly fantastic and mysterious birth" had occurred, noted by "commotion and panic among nurses and physicians". The child was said to possess a "supernatural appearance, with all the characteristics of the devil in flesh and blood," and was born speaking, threatening its own mother with death. The infant allegedly had a body covered in hair, two pointed horns, a tail of approximately five centimeters, and a "ferocious" gaze that "causes fear and chills". In the edition of May 12, Notícias Populares reported that the devil baby had threatened female staff members with death, torn pillows with its horns, and escaped from the hospital. Before fleeing, it purportedly declared: "This is not my place. This woman is not my mother..." and "I am leaving, I do not belong to this world. I am not from here. You are dreadful. You lack accessories".

Notícias Populares cited various incidents allegedly occurring throughout the Greater ABC region following the infant's disappearance: "Frequent disputes between couples and friends who had never before quarreled, dozens of fatal car collisions, and, above all, mass pedestrian accidents committed by otherwise exemplary drivers set the tone for the wave of panic that haunted the ABC region during the episode. Children were no longer seen playing in the streets. Women withdrew to their homes earlier, and doors locked in broad daylight became common practices among residents of the area". In the midst of the narrative, the newspaper reported that, after being captured by a group of religious individuals, the devil baby had been admitted to a private clinic in São Bernardo, which would be open to public visitation, provided that visitors were over 18 years of age, carried a crucifix, had no cardiac conditions, and assumed responsibility for possible "demonic possessions".

In the ensuing days, the newspaper published various additional acts attributed to the infant: it had allegedly walked across rooftops, driven a woman insane, disrupted an Umbanda ritual, frightened a taxi driver by requesting to be taken "to hell", and demanded blood to drink. The periodical continued to publish reports on the subject over the following days, featuring accounts from individuals who purportedly saw the child, claiming that it emitted "fire from its mouth" and "growled like a dog". Notícias Populares offered as explanations for the devil baby's birth that the mother had struck her belly and declared, "I will not go while this devil is not born", when invited to a procession during Holy Week. Another factor was that, according to an alleged physician, she had generated "negative magnetic discharges" upon venting: "Because of this little devil, I cannot go dancing". Furthermore, the child's father was described as a discreet farmer from Marília who, according to neighbors, "would not remove his hat for anything in this world".

As the days progressed, the story gradually received less prominence in the newspaper. Editor-in-chief Ebrahim Ramadan became reluctant to continue covering the case, but the management sustained the publications. Notícias Populares sought official sources, such as physicians and hospital administrators, but employed their refusals to comment in a manner that only heightened public suspicion. For 25 consecutive days, the newspaper's lead headline made some reference to the devil baby; thereafter, for an additional 12 days, stories about it still appeared on the front page, though no longer as the main headline, totaling 37 days of coverage on the event. In early June, it was reported that the devil baby had fled to the Northeast region after being kidnapped by individuals intent on burning it alive.

=== List of headlines ===
Below is the list of headlines published on the newspaper's front page, alongside the respective dates of publication — all referring to the year 1975.

1. May 11 — The Devil Was Born in São Paulo
2. May 12 — Devil Baby Disappears
3. May 13 — Sorcerer Will Go to ABC Region to Exorcise the Devil Baby
4. May 14 — Devil Baby from ABC Region Weighs 5 Kilos
5. May 15 — Devil Baby Torments Priest from ABC Region
6. May 16 — We Saw the Devil Baby
7. May 17 — People Will Go See the Devil Baby
8. May 18 — Procession Will Expel the Devil Baby
9. May 19 — Saw the Devil Baby and Went Mad
10. May 20 — Saint Predicted the Devil Baby
11. May 21 — Devil Baby on the Rooftops of ABC Region Homes
12. May 22 — Physician Affirms: The Devil Baby Was Born in the ABC Region
13. May 23 — Devil Will Destroy the World in 1981
14. May 24 — Devil Baby Stopped a Taxi on the Avenue
15. May 25 — Farmer Is the Father of the Devil Baby
16. May 26 — Devil Baby Travels to See the Father
17. May 27 — Devil Baby Appears at the Site of the Eclipse
18. May 28 — Seven More Saw the Devil Baby
19. May 29 — Bishop Dies of Fear of the Devil Baby
20. May 30 — Devil Baby Disrupts Umbanda Ritual
21. May 31 — Fanatics Threaten the Devil Baby from ABC Region
22. June 1 — Devil Baby Kidnapped
23. June 2 — Devil Baby to Death
24. June 3 — Devil Baby Flees to the Northeast
25. June 4 — Priest from Marília: "I Believe in the Devil Baby from the ABC Region"
26. June 5 — Coffin Joe Will Hunt the Devil Baby in the Northeast
27. June 8 — People See New Devil Baby from ABC Region

== Repercussion and legacy ==
The reports on the devil baby elicited significant public reactions — which were also reported by Notícias Populares itself. One woman went to the maternity hospital where the child was allegedly born, demanding: "It happened, it happened. So why do they not show it?" Sorcerers, religious fanatics, and Coffin Joe offered to "put an end" to the devil baby.

The newspaper was the sole outlet to cover the story. With a previous average daily circulation of 70,000 to 80,000 copies, sales surged to more than 150,000 or 200,000 during the coverage of the case. The first report, published on May 11, broke all sales records at the time, with only eight copies remaining across the two thousand newsstands where the newspaper was sold. The episode is considered one of the most remarkable in the history of Notícias Populares and is recounted in detail in books such as Espreme Que Sai Sangue: Um Estudo do Sensacionalismo na Imprensa, by Danilo Angrimani, and Nada Mais Que a Verdade: A Extraordinária História do Jornal Notícias Populares, by Celso de Campos Jr., Denis Moreira, Giancarlo Lepiani, and Maik Rene Lima. There is also a 2002 documentary on urban legends, entitled Nasceu o Bebê-Diabo em São Paulo, by Renata Druck, which places this story among other São Paulo urban legends. The subject has also been discussed in academic articles (see Academic articles).

== See also ==
- Escola Base case
