= Aclimação Park =

Urban public park in São Paulo, Brazil

- Parque da Aclimação
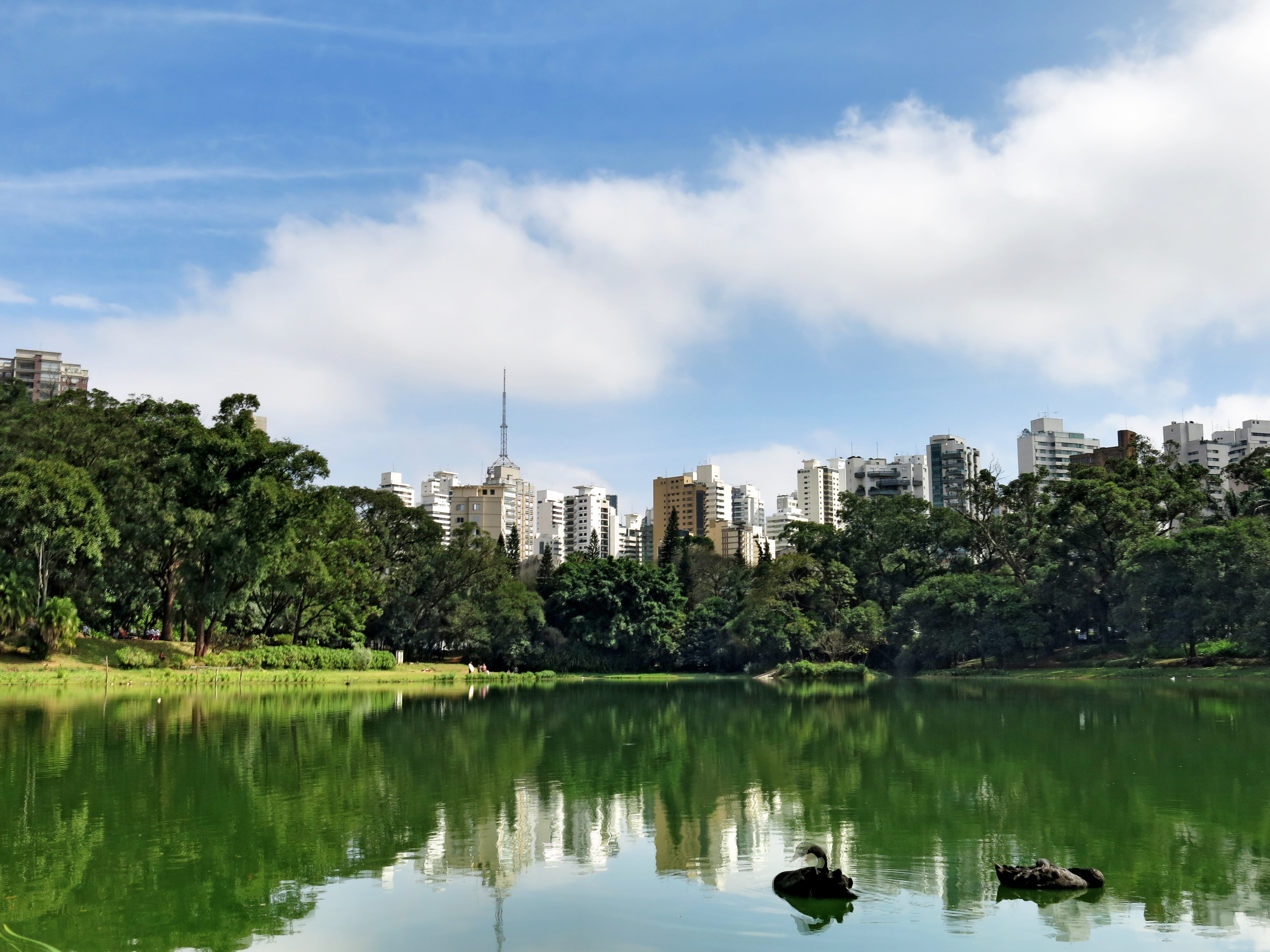
- Type: Urban park
- Location: São Paulo, São Paulo; Brazil
- Coordinates: 23°34′29″S 46°37′44″W
- Area: 112,000 square kilometres (43,000 sq mi)
- Opened: 1939
- Administered by: SVMA

Aclimação Park (Portuguese: Parque da Aclimação) is a public leisure area located in the Aclimação district, in the central area of the Brazilian city of São Paulo. It opened on September 16, 1939, and covers an area of 112,000 square meters. It dates back to 1892, when Carlos Botelho decided to establish a garden on the site inspired by the Jardin d'Acclimatation in Paris. It was acquired by São Paulo City Hall in the 1930s.

The park was listed as a protected area in 1986 by the Council for the Defense of Historical, Archaeological, Artistic and Tourist Heritage (Condephaat). It includes a lake with around 70,000 cubic meters of water, a Japanese garden with a water mirror, an acoustic shell, playgrounds, gym equipment, a jogging track and a walking track. The fauna counts around 111 species, including birds such as the southern lapwing, the shiny cowbird, the red ovenbird and the rufous-bellied thrush. The local vegetation has landscaped areas with native and exotic species, such as guanandi, jacaranda, an extensive eucalyptus grove and fruit trees.

== History ==
After years in Paris visiting the Jardin d'Acclimatation, Carlos Botelho returned to Brazil in 1880 with the desire to build a similar area in the city of São Paulo. In 1892, he founded the Aclimação Garden at Sítio do Tapanhoin, where he built a dairy farm, the first zoo in São Paulo, a cancer research center, the first silo in Latin America and the first riding club in Brazil. Access to the garden was provided by two monumental cast iron gates: the main one faced Aclimação Avenue and the other Muniz de Souza Street. Around 1930, the Botelho family began to subdivide the area, mainly the land of the private property attached to the park, which allowed for the creation of streets and boulevards.

In 1939, Francisco Prestes Maia, the mayor of São Paulo, displeased with the subdivision of the site, approached the family to present a proposal for purchase by the São Paulo City Hall, which was accepted. In the 1950s, the area received a library, an acoustic shell, a playground and a soccer field. In the 1980s, the neighborhood residents' association, park's defenders and ecological organizations mobilized and achieved the protection of the park by the Council for the Defense of Historical, Archaeological, Artistic and Tourist Heritage (Condephaat).

In 2007, the park's lake burst due to the intensity of the rainfall in the city. Thousands of tilapia and carp flowed into the Pedra Azul and Jurubatuba streams, which are heavily polluted. 300 fish and 48 birds were rescued and taken to Ibirapuera Park. It took seven days to fill the lake after the sludge had been removed to reduce the stench left by the dead fish. In 2009, the lake broke and emptied again due to the rains. In 2010, it underwent repairs to install a spillway to prevent further rains from causing it to collapse again.

== Infrastructure, fauna and flora ==
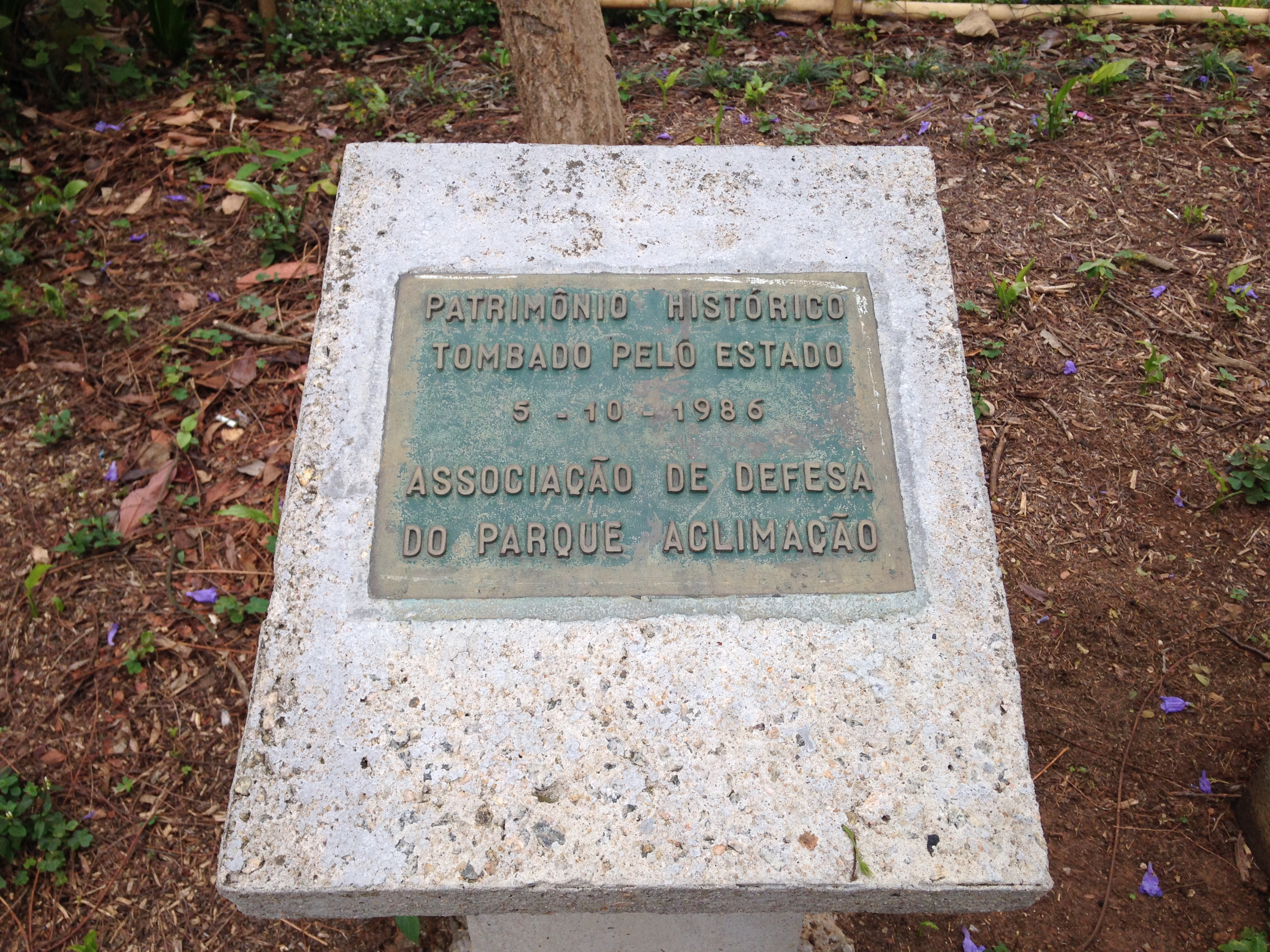
Park's heritage plaque.

Aclimação Park covers an area of 118,787 square meters, including 65,856 square meters of vegetation, 120 square meters of permeable surfaces, 18,110 square meters of impermeable surfaces, 33,380 square meters of lake and 1,321 square meters of buildings. There are 6 entrances for the public. Inside, the site has an acoustic shell, rest areas, drinking fountains, a bike rack with 15 spaces, 6 barbecue pits, 40 garbage cans, 49 benches, 3 kiosks, 3 toilets and bird feeders. Highlights include several areas for children to play and a "longevity playground" with equipment for the elderly to exercise.

The park includes a bocce court with 403 square meters, a soccer pitch with bleachers, a 172 square meters mesh court, 7 tables for games, a 1,500 meter jogging track, 3 sand ponds, a 136-meter trail, a pet nursery and a seedling nursery. It also has a library operated by the Municipal Department of Culture, which offers a collection of 31,000 copies of textbooks, dictionaries, encyclopedias, newspapers, magazines and maps.

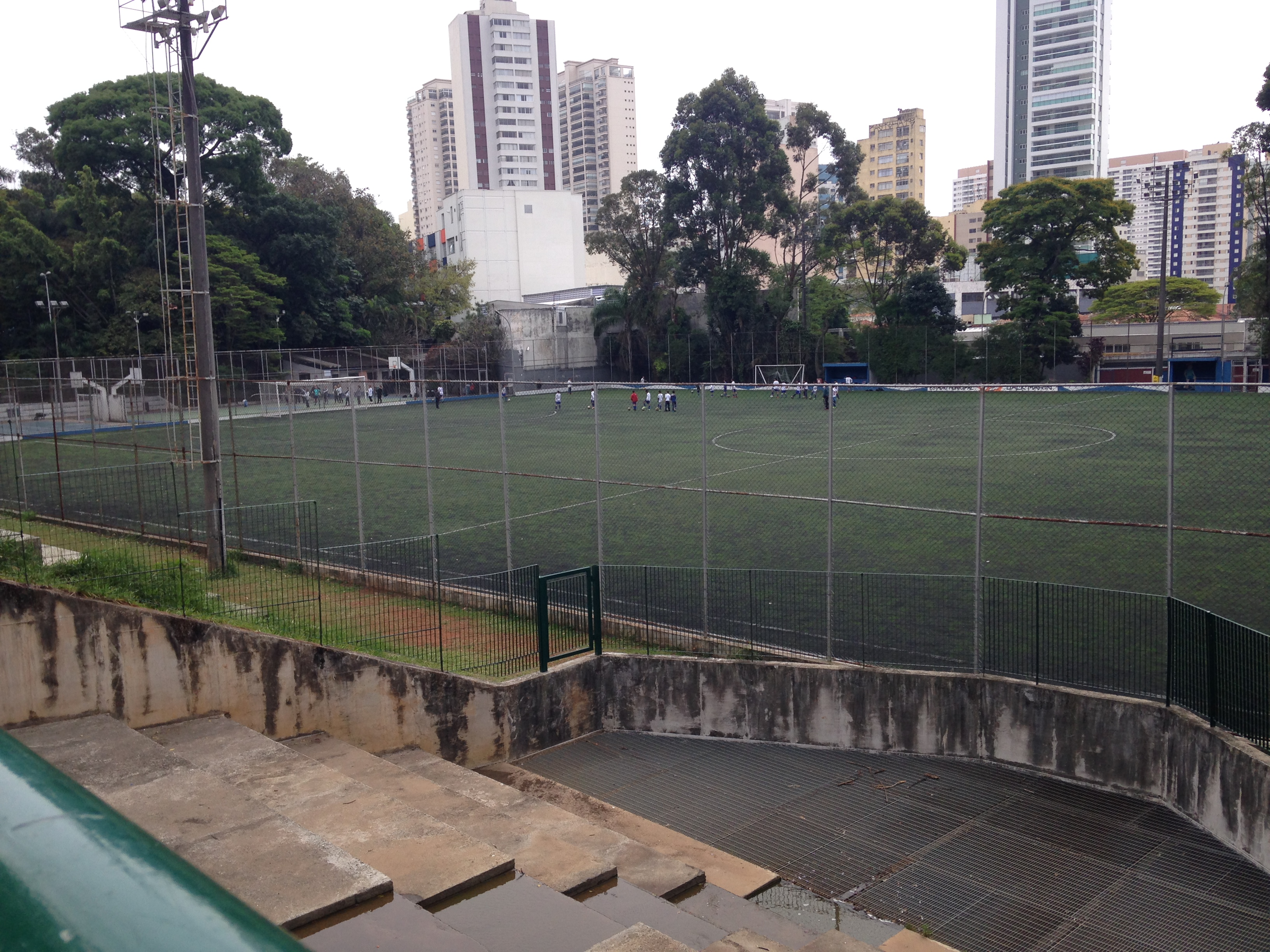
Soccer pitch at the Jack Marin Municipal Stadium.

Among the vegetation, the highlight is the extensive eucalyptus grove that occupies a large part of the park's area. There are also exotic species, such as weeping willow, fig and rubber tree, and native species, such as diesel tree and jequitibá-rosa. The park is predominantly home to waterfowl, such as the night-heron, the neotropic cormorant and the ringed kingfisher. Migratory birds can also be spotted, such as the Brazilian teal and the white-faced whistling duck. The lake is home to fish such as tilapia, koi and mirror carp.

=== Jack Marin Municipal Stadium ===
Aclimação Park features the Jack Marin Municipal Stadium, which is run by the Municipal Department of Sports and Leisure. It was founded in 1927 and became the first municipal soccer school in Brazil and Latin America. It has a soccer pitch measuring 60 meters wide by 90 meters long, two multi-sports courts, changing rooms, a medical and administrative department, a multidisciplinary care room and a cafeteria. Currently, it hosts an indoor soccer school for children and young people, and caters for grassroots clubs in the evenings and at weekends. The place was named after Jack Marin by Municipal Decree No. 18,721 on March 11, 1983.

== Gallery ==
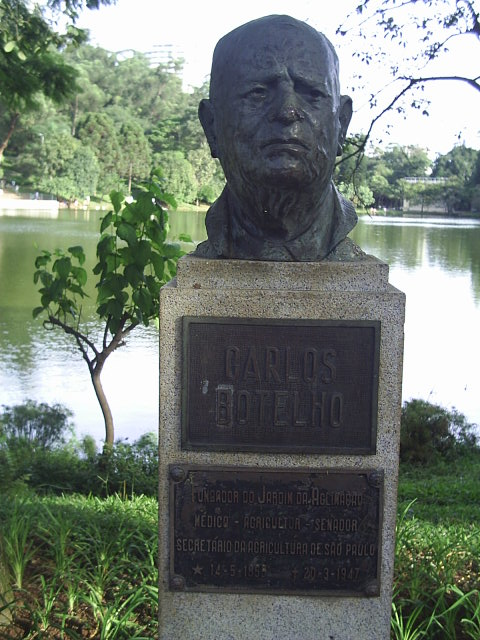
Carlos Botelho, founder of the park.

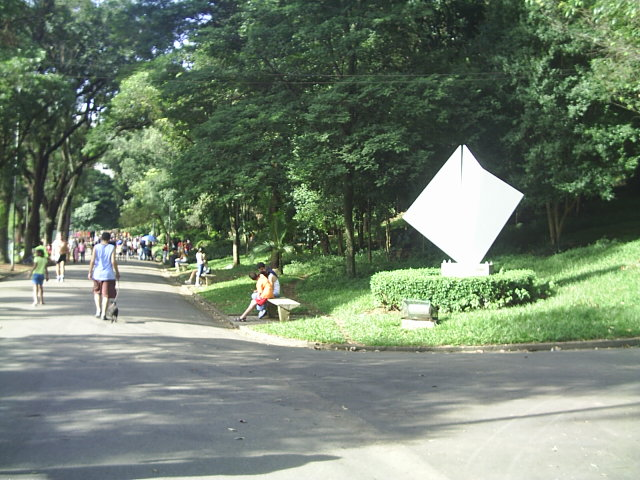
Works of art spread throughout the park.

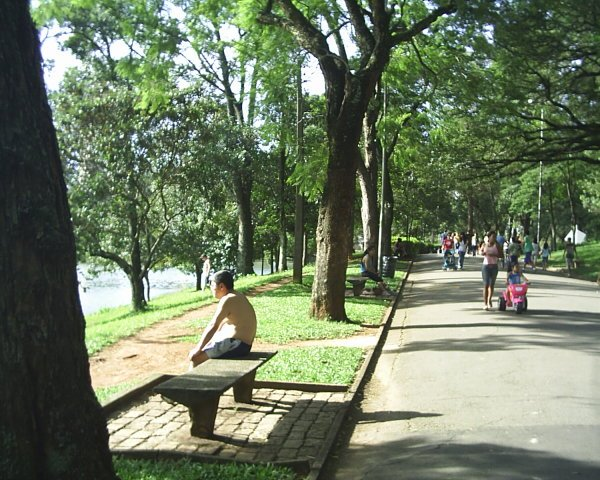
People frequenting the park.

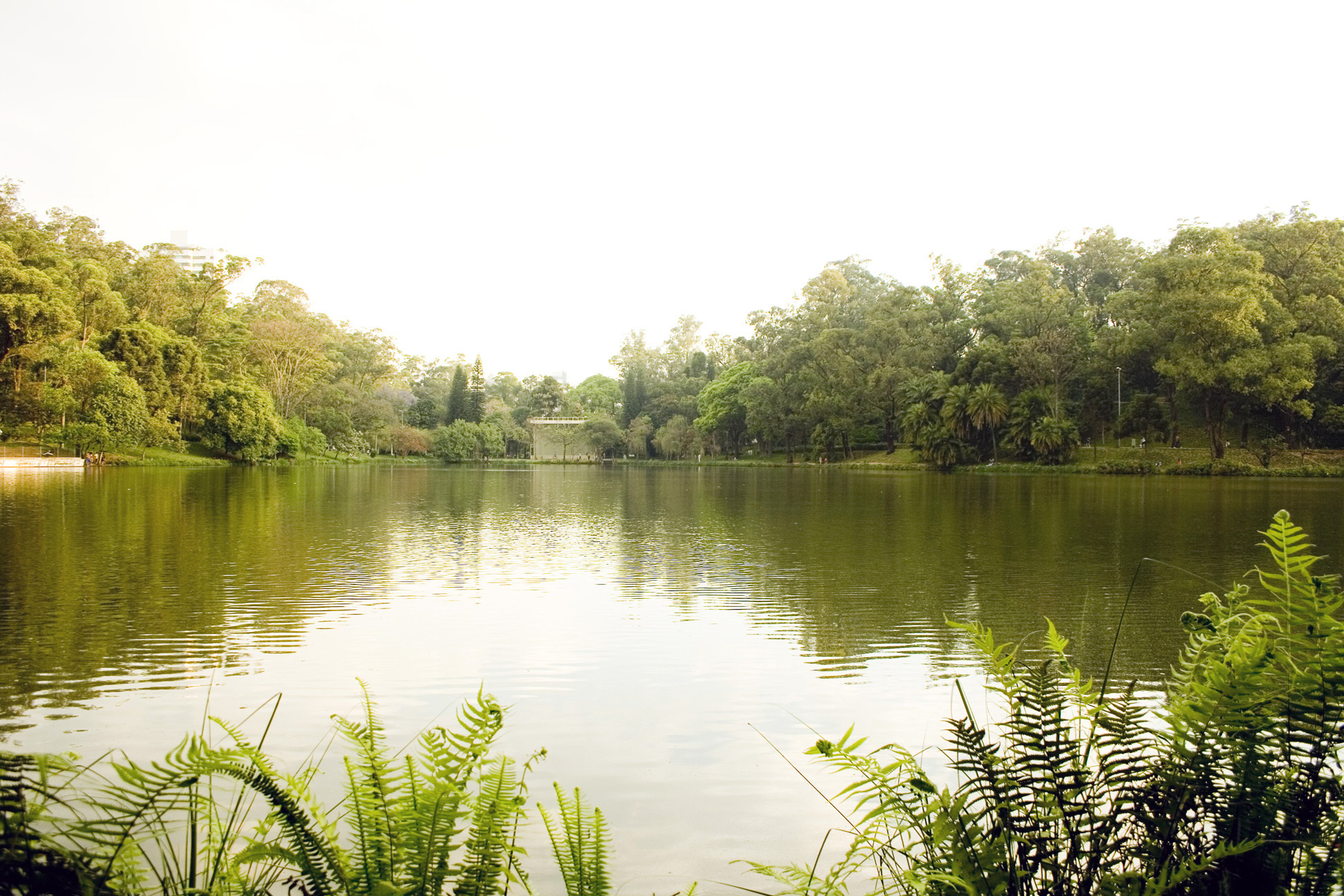
Park lake.

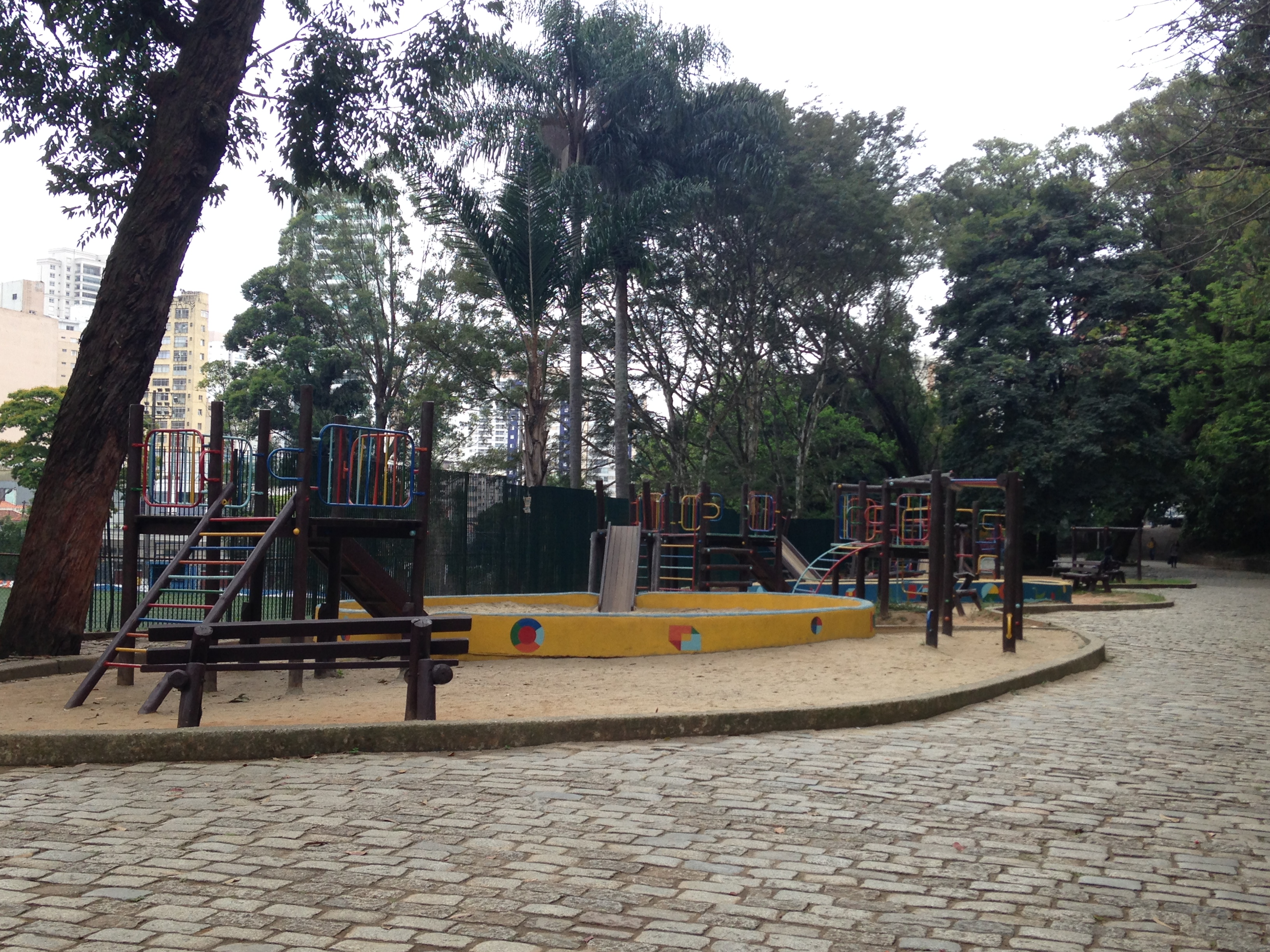
Children's play area.

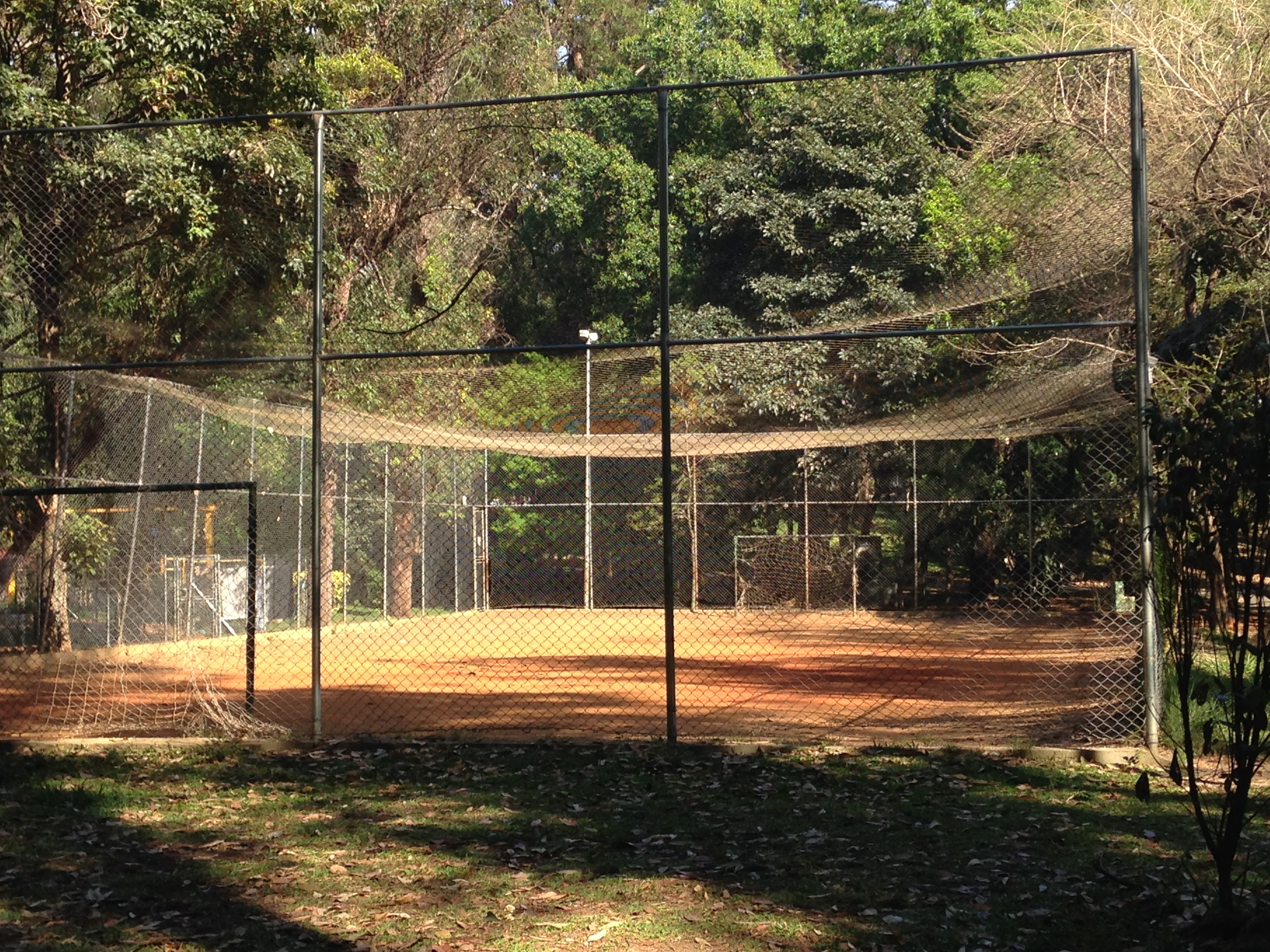
Dirt soccer field.

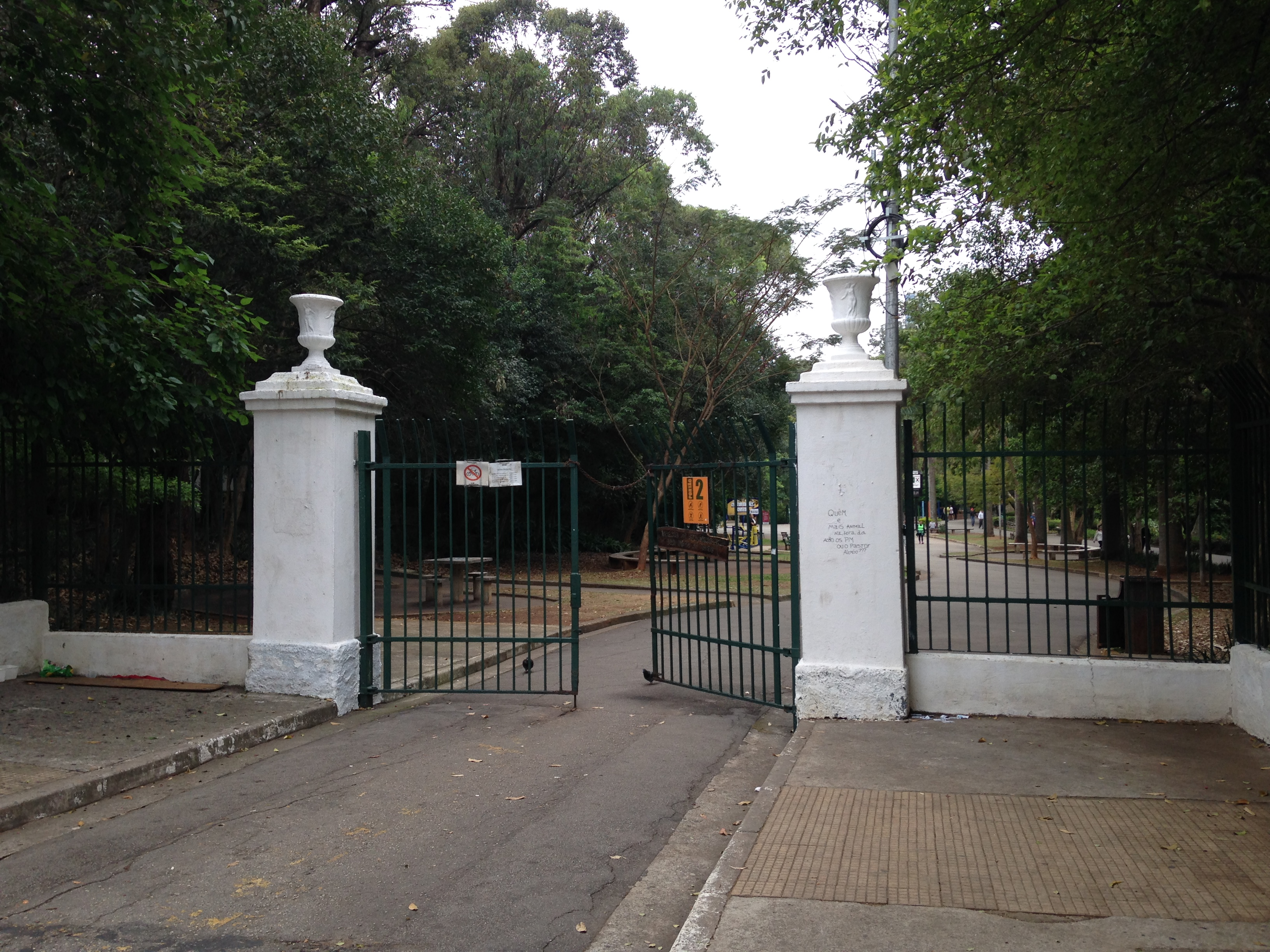
Secondary entrance.

== See also ==
- Tourism in the city of São Paulo
- Ibirapuera Park
- Aclimação
