= Curvelo =

- Municipality
- Municipality of Curvelo
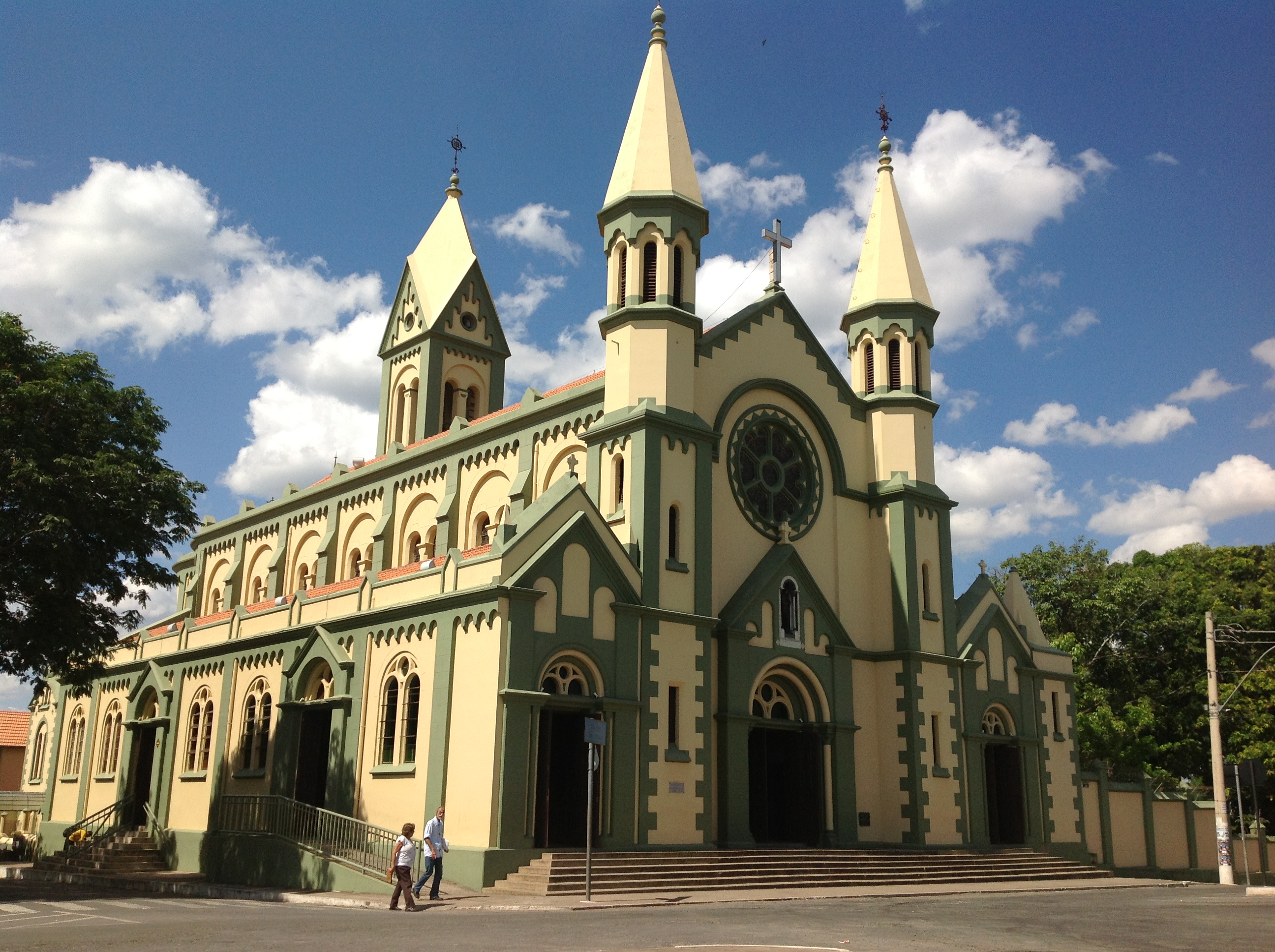
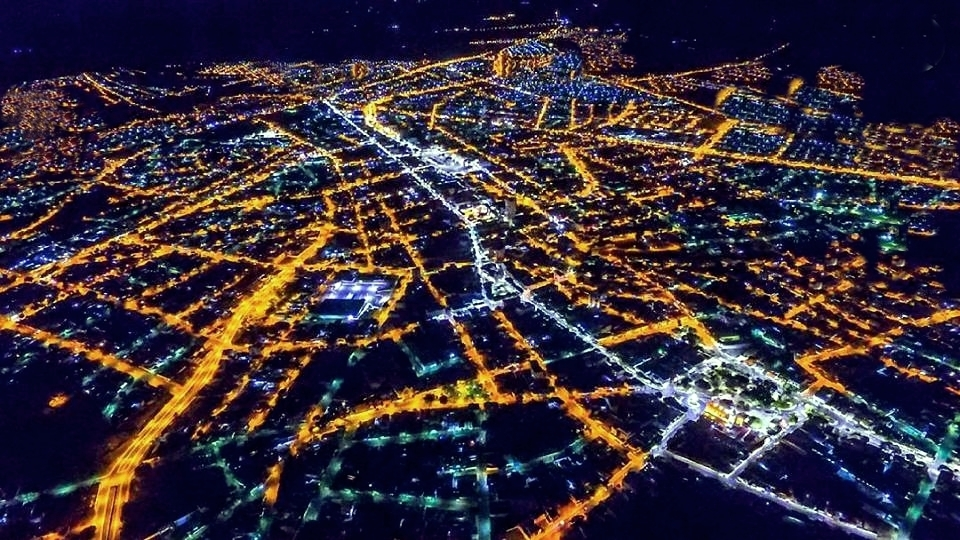
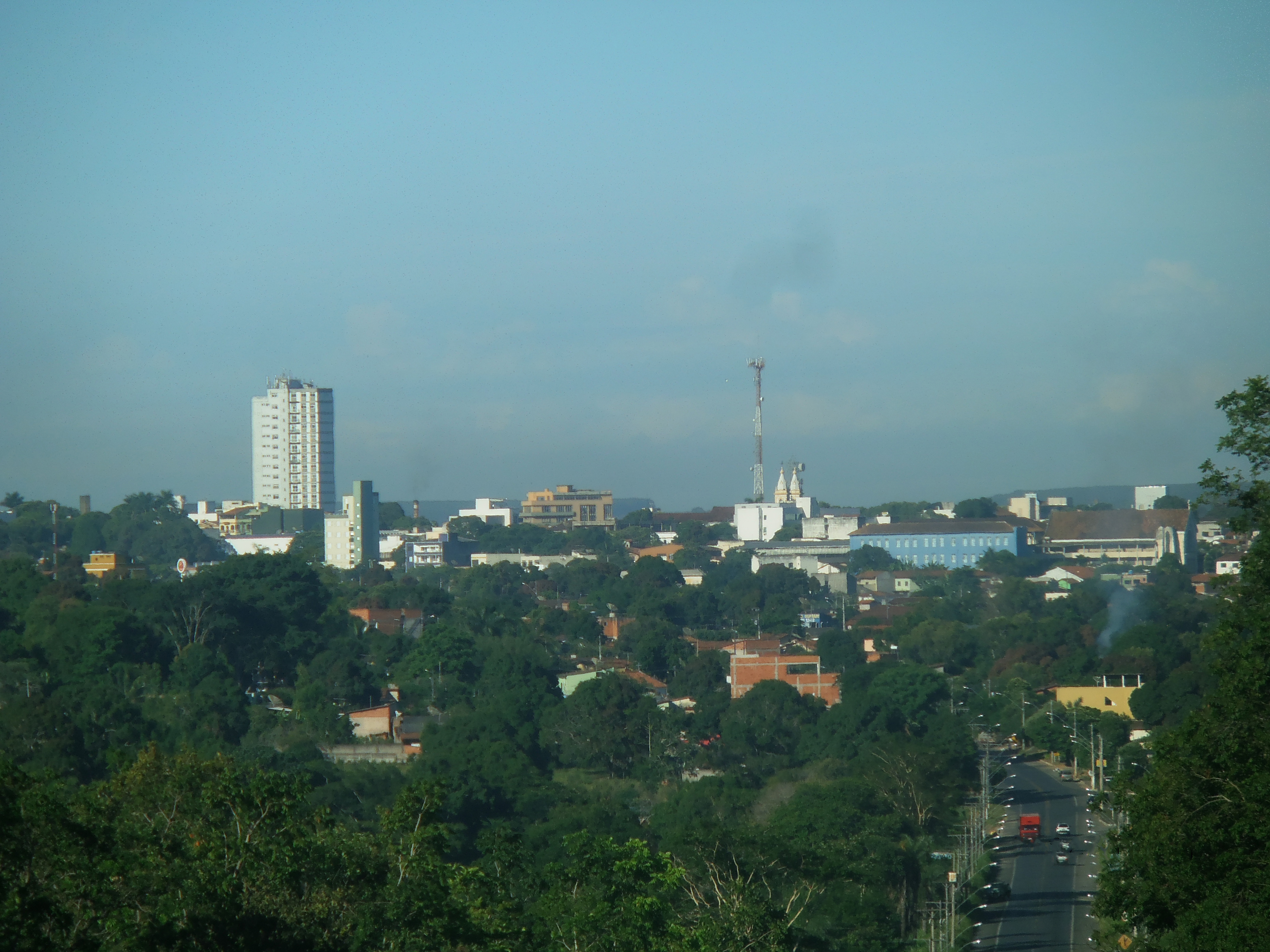
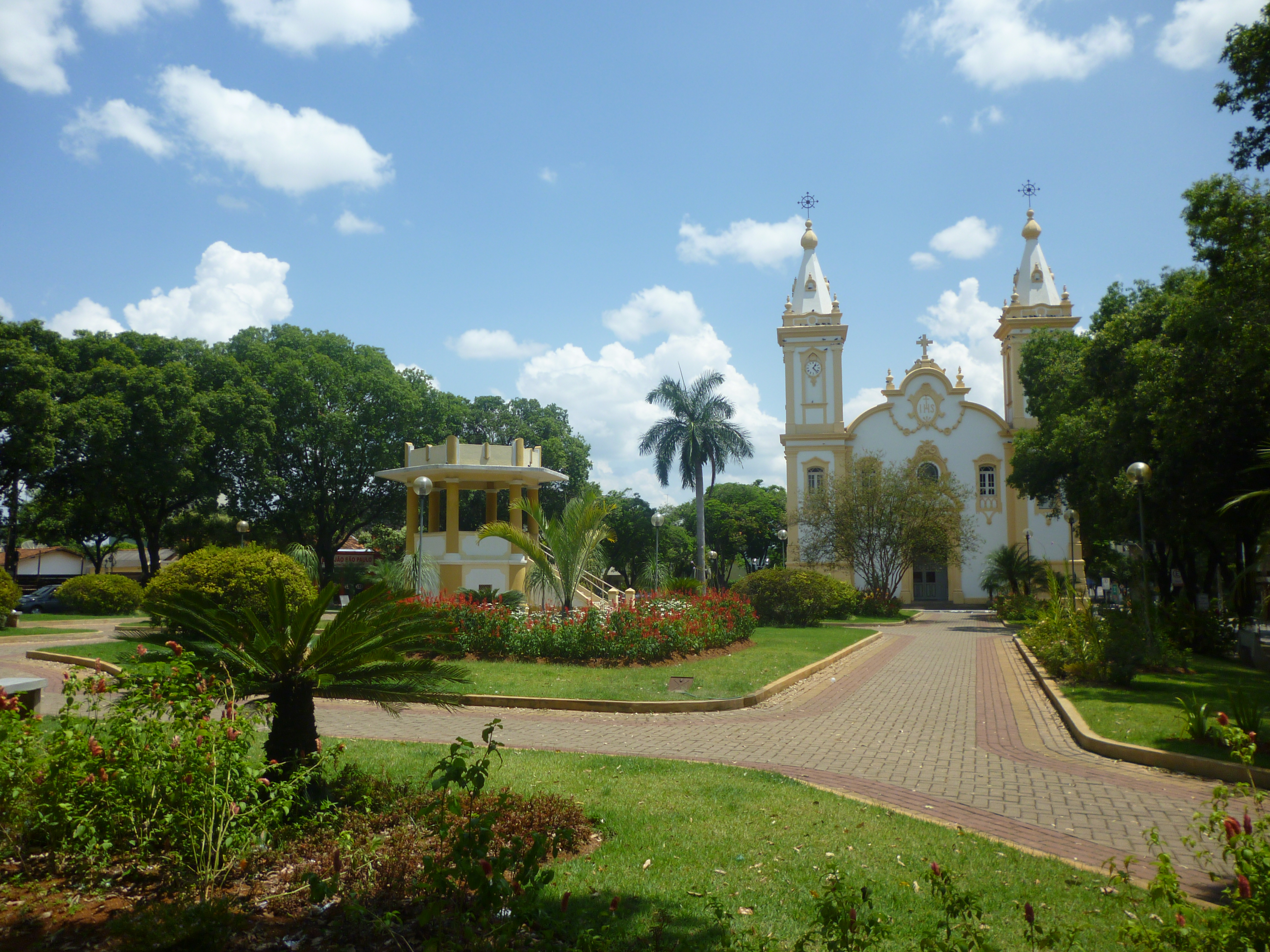
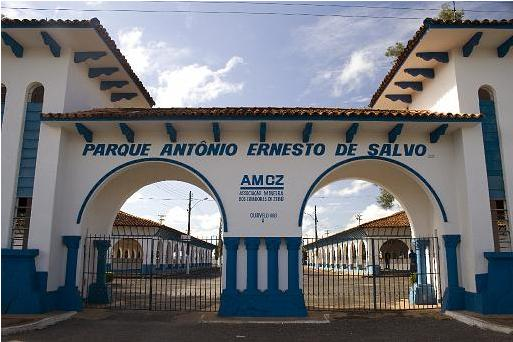
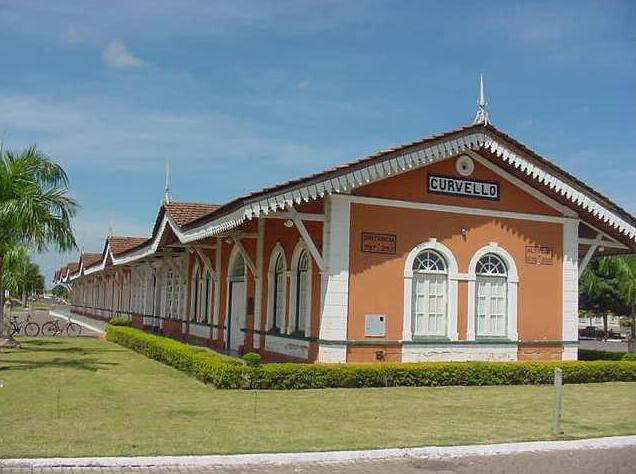
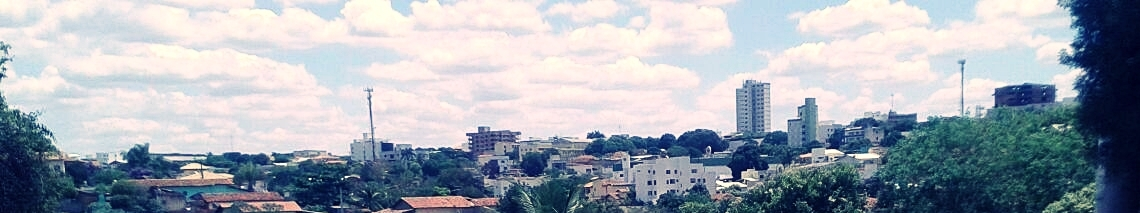

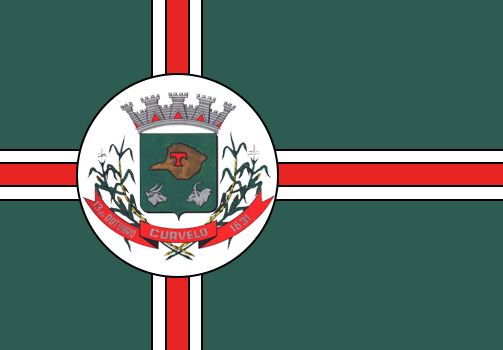
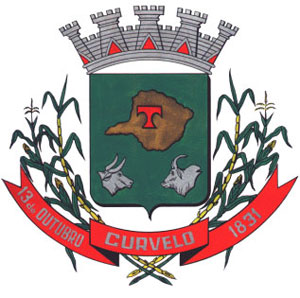
- Flag Coat of arms
- Nickname: Hinterland gate
- Motto: "O temor do senhor é o princípio da sabedoria"
- Location of Curvelo in the state of Minas Gerais

- Location of Curvelo in Brazil
- Coordinates: 18°45′21″S 44°25′51″W
- Country: Brazil
- Region: Southeast
- State: Minas Gerais

Government
  - Prefeito: Luiz Paulo (PP)

Area
  - Total: 3,295.894 km^{2} (1,272.552 sq mi)
- Elevation: 672 m (2,205 ft)

Population (2022 Census)
  - Total: 80,665
  - Estimate (2025): 84,297
- Time zone: UTC−3 (BRT)
- HDI (2010): 0.713 – high
- Website: www.curvelo.mg.gov.br

Curvelo is a municipality in the state of Minas Gerais, Brazil. It is located in the geodesic centre of Minas Gerais, 170 km north of the capital, Belo Horizonte, and connected to the capital by highways MG 135 and BR 040. Its estimated population is 84,296 inhabitants (2025) and the total area of the municipality is 3,296 kmª. The city lies at an altitude of 633 metres. Curvelo takes its name from the Brazil-born Portuguese priest Antônio Corvelo de Ávila, when the parish of Santo Antônio da Estrada e o Padre Antônio de Ávila Curvelo was founded in the 18th century (on 16 March 1720).

== Curvelo Statistical Micro-region ==
Curvelo is also a statistical micro-region with 11 municipalities: Augusto de Lima, Buenópolis, Corinto, Curvelo, Felixlândia, Inimutaba, Joaquim Felício, Monjolos, Morro da Garça, Presidente Juscelino, and Santo Hipólito. The population in 2000 was 141,619 inhabitants in a total area of 13,792.20 km^{2}. The population density was 10.27 inhabitants/km^{2} (2000).

== Geography ==
Curvelo titles itself the Gateway to the Sertão (Portal do Sertão), due to its geographical location — the area of transition to a drier vegetation and climate.

It is located on a large raised plain in the centre of the state, where there are no mountain chains. It is between the basins of the São Francisco River, the Rio das Velhas, Paraopeba, Cipó, and Bicudo. Neighboring municipalities are: Corinto, Felixlândia, Inimutaba, Monjolos, Morro da Garça, Presidente Juscelino and Santo Hipólito. The distance to Belo Horizonte is 170 km. Connecting highways are BR-135, coming from the south, and BR-259, east to west.

== Economic activities ==
Curvelo's economy is mainly dependent on goods and services, but agriculture is still important. The Gross Domestic Product in 2005 was R$413 million, with 264 million from services, 55 million from industry, and 44 million from agriculture. The cattle herd had 122,000 head in 2006. In the rural area there were 1,165 producers on 172,000 hectares. Only 210 of the farms had tractors (2006). Around 4,000 people were involved in agriculture (2006). The main crops were citrus fruits, rice, sugarcane, beans, manioc, and corn. As of 2007 there were 7 banks and 8,487 automobiles, giving a ratio of 8 inhabitants per automobile.

In recent years the planting of eucalyptus trees on a great scale to provide charcoal for the industries of Sete Lagoas and Contagem has brought revenue to the municipality but has also contributed to great ecological damage to the fauna and flora. One company alone, V&M Florestal Ltda., has 338.67 km^{2} planted in the municipality. More land is also used for charcoal production in João Pinheiro, Bocaiúva, Brasilândia, Paraopeba and other smaller communities.

Traditionally small round ovens were used on each property to make charcoal, but these are gradually being replaced by modern more centralized ovens. When the charcoal is ready it is transported by truck to the industrial area of greater Belo Horizonte.

In addition to the ecological damage of destroying the land to plant trees of only one species, the physical risks for the charcoal workers are: excessive fatigue due to lifting and transporting heavy materials, which can bring on physical stress and cause damage to various muscles and skeletal structures (one study showed that a typical charcoal worker will carry 7,000 kilos of Eucalyptus wood to fill a 5 cubic metre oven in one hour!); long hours of work, including shifts during nights and the weekends, which brings about alterations in biological rhythms, increasing the risk of accidents on the job, difficulty in sleeping, chronic fatigue and loss of emotional control; and dust and smoke inhalation, causing skin irritations, conjunctivitis, and respiratory problems.

Brazil is the largest world producer of "ferro-gusa" or pig iron (used in the production of steel), which has as its base this charcoal produced from trees. Counting only last year, the 52 industries involved in the production of "ferro-gusa" made 700 million dollars in profit. "Ferro-gusa" is a primary substance in modern ironworks industry. Mineral charcoal, the closest alternative, is not largely used in this industry in Brazil, since the country does not have significant mineral charcoal reserves.

== Health and education ==
In 2005 there were 40 health establishments, of which 27 were public and 13 were private. These included 12 specialized clinics and 2 hospitals with 157 beds. Educational needs were met by 34 public and 11 private primary schools, 9 public and 4 private middle schools, and 14 public and 11 private pre-primary schools. In higher education there is the Faculdade de Ciências Administrativas de Curvelo and the Faculdade de Ciências Humanas de Curvelo.

- MHDI: .755 (2000)
- State ranking: 247 out of 853 municipalities
- National ranking: 1,724 out of 5,138 municipalities in 2000
- Life expectancy: 70
- Literacy rate: 88

The above figures can be compared with those of Poços de Caldas, which had an MHDI of .841, the highest in the state of Minas Gerais. The highest in the country was São Caetano do Sul in the state of São Paulo with an MHDI of .919. The lowest was Manari in the state of Pernambuco with an MHDI of .467 out of a total of 5504 municipalities in the country as of 2004. At last count Brazil had 5,561 municipalities so this might have changed at the time of this writing.

== Celebrations ==
The most important popular event is the Forró Beneficente de Curvelo, which takes place in July. This is a festival of popular music. During the period of four days the city receives 100,000 visitors. For images of the Forró de Curvelo see Forro de Curvelo

== Climate ==
Climate data for Curvelo (1981–2010)
Month	Jan	Feb	Mar	Apr	May	Jun	Jul	Aug	Sep	Oct	Nov	Dec	Year
Mean daily maximum °C (°F)	31.2 (88.2)	32.1 (89.8)	31.6 (88.9)	31.1 (88.0)	29.4 (84.9)	28.4 (83.1)	28.5 (83.3)	30.1 (86.2)	32.0 (89.6)	32.3 (90.1)	30.8 (87.4)	30.3 (86.5)	30.7 (87.3)
Daily mean °C (°F)	24.4 (75.9)	24.9 (76.8)	24.6 (76.3)	23.6 (74.5)	21.4 (70.5)	19.8 (67.6)	19.7 (67.5)	21.3 (70.3)	23.5 (74.3)	24.6 (76.3)	24.0 (75.2)	23.9 (75.0)	23.0 (73.4)
Mean daily minimum °C (°F)	19.1 (66.4)	19.0 (66.2)	18.6 (65.5)	17.0 (62.6)	14.2 (57.6)	12.1 (53.8)	11.6 (52.9)	12.9 (55.2)	15.8 (60.4)	18.2 (64.8)	18.7 (65.7)	19.1 (66.4)	16.4 (61.5)
Average precipitation mm (inches)	208.8 (8.22)	116.3 (4.58)	154.6 (6.09)	43.1 (1.70)	18.7 (0.74)	6.6 (0.26)	6.2 (0.24)	11.7 (0.46)	19.0 (0.75)	67.8 (2.67)	191.0 (7.52)	250.2 (9.85)	1,094 (43.07)
Average precipitation days (≥ 1.0 mm)	13	9	9	4	2	1	1	1	3	6	13	15	77
Average relative humidity (%)	73.8	70.8	70.8	70.3	68.6	66.4	62.5	58.2	55.3	61.7	71.1	76.9	67.2
Mean monthly sunshine hours	151.3	151.6	134.8	196.0	175.3	172.5	189.8	191.6	167.2	148.5	143.6	112.8	1,935
Source: Instituto Nacional de Meteorologia

== See also ==
- List of municipalities in Minas Gerais
