= Presidente Juscelino =

Municipality of Brazil

Coordinates: 18°38′13″S 44°03′28″W

- Municipality
- Interactive map of Presidente Juscelino
- Country: Brazil
- State: Minas Gerais
- Region: Southeast

Population (2022 Census)
  - Total: 3,465
  - Estimate (2025): 3,471
- Time zone: UTC−3 (BRT)

Location of Presidente Juscelino in the state of Minas Gerais

Presidente Juscelino is a Brazilian municipality located in the northeast of the state of Minas Gerais. Its population as of 2025 was 3,471 living in a total area of 695 km^{2}. The city belongs to the statistical mesoregion of Central Mineira and to the statistical microregion of Curvelo. It became a municipality in 1962.

Named after the former president of Brazil Juscelino Kubitschek, Presidente Juscelino is located at an elevation of 596 meters, 40 km. west of Curvelo on highway BR-259. The distance to the state capital, Belo Horizonte, is 216 km. Neighboring municipalities are: Corinto, Curvelo and Felixlândia.

The main economic activities are services, small industries, and agriculture. The production of charcoal from eucalyptus plantations is especially important. The GDP in 2005 was R$21 million, with 9 million from services, 4 million from small industries, and 7 million from agriculture. There were 286 rural producers on 35,000 hectares of land. Approximately 1000 persons were dependent on agriculture. The main crops were beans and corn. There were 23,000 head of cattle (2005). There were no banks (2007), only

34 farms had tractors (2006) and 218 automobiles (108 motorcycles), giving a ratio of 20 inhabitants per automobile.

There is only one health clinic. Patients with more serious health conditions are transported to Curvelo. There are only five primary schools, one middle school, and two pre-primary schools.

- Municipal Human Development Index: 0.654 (2000)
- State ranking: 733 out of 853 municipalities as of 2000
- National ranking: 3,707 out of 5,138 municipalities as of 2000
- Literacy rate: 77%
- Life expectancy: 65 (average of males and females)

In 2000, the per capita income of R$97.00 was well below the state and national averages of R$276.00 and R$297.00 respectively.

The highest-ranking municipality in Minas Gerais in 2000 was Poços de Caldas with 0.841, while the lowest was Setubinha with 0.568. Nationally the highest was São Caetano do Sul in São Paulo with 0.919, while the lowest was Setubinha. In more recent statistics (considering 5,507 municipalities) Manari in the state of Pernambuco has the lowest rating in the country—0,467—putting it in last place.

== See also ==
- List of municipalities in Minas Gerais
