= Vassununga State Park =

State park in São Paulo, Brazil

- Parque Estadual Vassununga
- IUCN category II (national park)
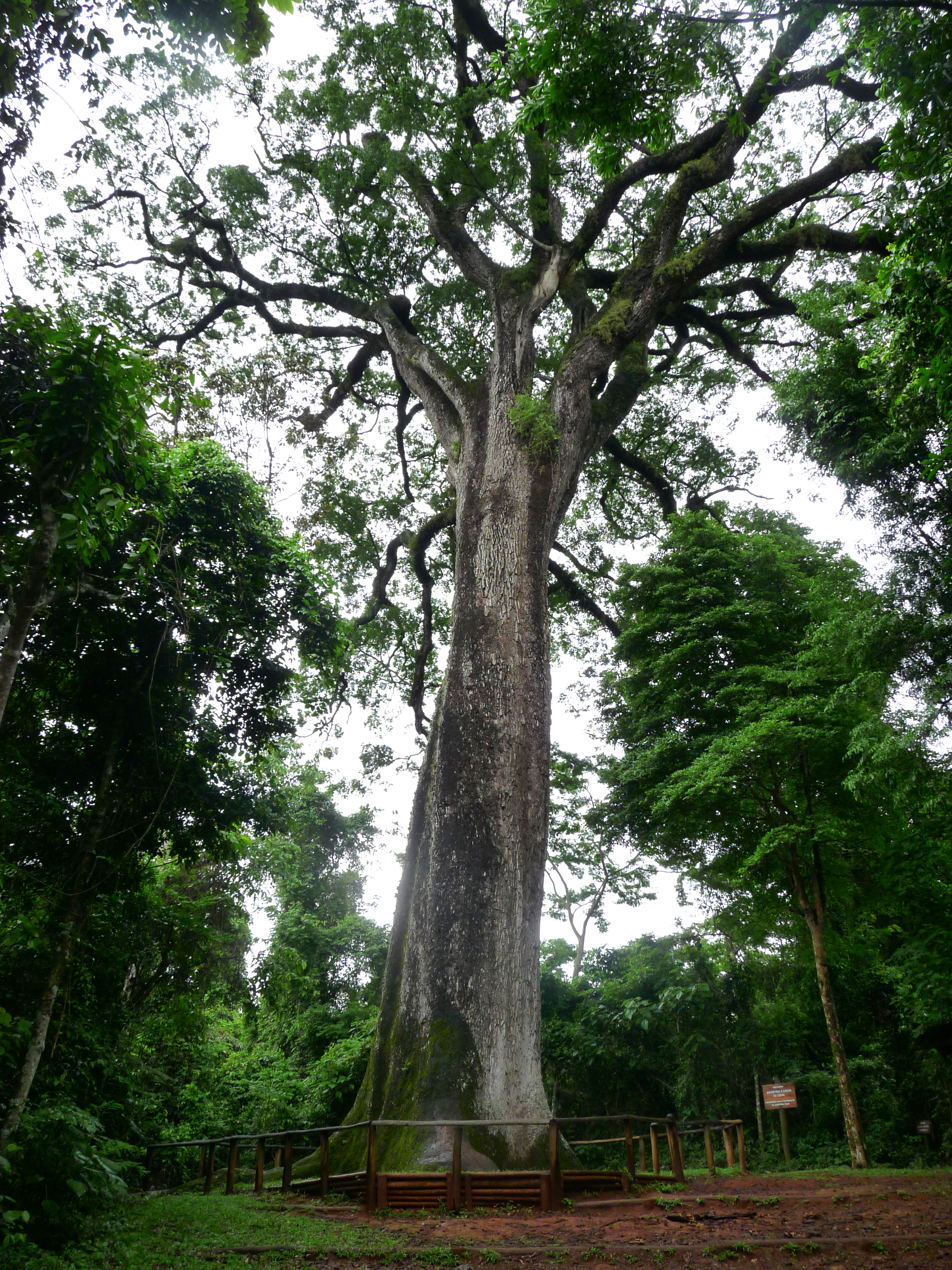
- O Patriarca: the oldest jequitibá tree.

- Location within Brazil
- Nearest city: Santa Rita do Passa Quatro, São Paulo
- Coordinates: 21.722005°S 47.592460°W
- Designation: State park
- Created: 26 October 1970

The Vassununga State Park (Portuguese: Parque Estadual Vassununga) is a state park in the state of São Paulo, Brazil. It preserves an area of interior Atlantic Forest and cerrado, including a huge jequitibá-rosa (Cariniana legalis) tree that by some accounts is the oldest tree in Brazil.

== Location ==
The Vassununga State Park is 245 kilometres (152 mi) from the city of São Paulo. The park is on both sides of km 245 of the Rodovia Anhangüera (SP-330 highway) in the municipality of Santa Rita do Passa Quatro in the northeastern region of the State of São Paulo. It has six unconnected sections: Capão da Várzea, Capetinga Oeste, Capetinga Lesta, Praxedes, Maravilha and Pé de Gigante. It has a total area of 2,071.42 hectares (5,118.6 acres), and protects an area of Atlantic semi-deciduous forest and cerrado forest.

== History ==
The region was first developed for cattle farming, then from 1850 for coffee plantations. The landowners often maintained forest reserves to conserve soil for future plantations, preserve water sources, provide natural nurseries for coffee plants, give a source of wood for construction, maintain an area to hunt and so on. One such area was the property of the Vassununga Sugar Mill and contained the largest and most beautiful forest of jequitibás-rosa in the region. The sugar company went bankrupt in 1969. The Vassununga State Park was created through state decree 52.546 of 26 October 1970 to preserve this area of forest and its fauna.

== Environment ==
The Vassununga State Park contains one of the last remnants of Interior Atlantic Forest in the area, with semideciduous rainforest and cerrado forest and associated fauna. There are many jequitibá-rosa (Cariniana legalis) trees, including the largest in the state that may be visited by the public. The forest covers hills, cliffs and fluvial plains, creating a beautiful landscape of emergent forest in which the huge jequitibá-rosa trees stand out.

The park is in a highly fragmented landscape under considerable stress from human activities. There are few native ecosystems and particularly high risk of erosion near the watersheds and rivers. A strategy of connecting the fragments of the park by means of ecological corridors or stepping stones, and of ensuring sustainable use in the lands around it would be extremely useful in maintaining biodiversity.

=== Flora ===
Flora include specimens of jequitibá-rosa (Cariniana legalis), guaritá (Astronium graveolens), caixeta-preta (Tabebuia cassinoides), capixingui (Croton floribundus), pau-pereira (Platycyamus regnellii), copaiba, peroba-rosa (Aspidosperma polyneuron), figueira (Ficus), cedro-rosa (Cedrela fissilis), araribá (Centrolobium tomentosum) and paineira (Spirotheca rivieri).

=== Birds ===
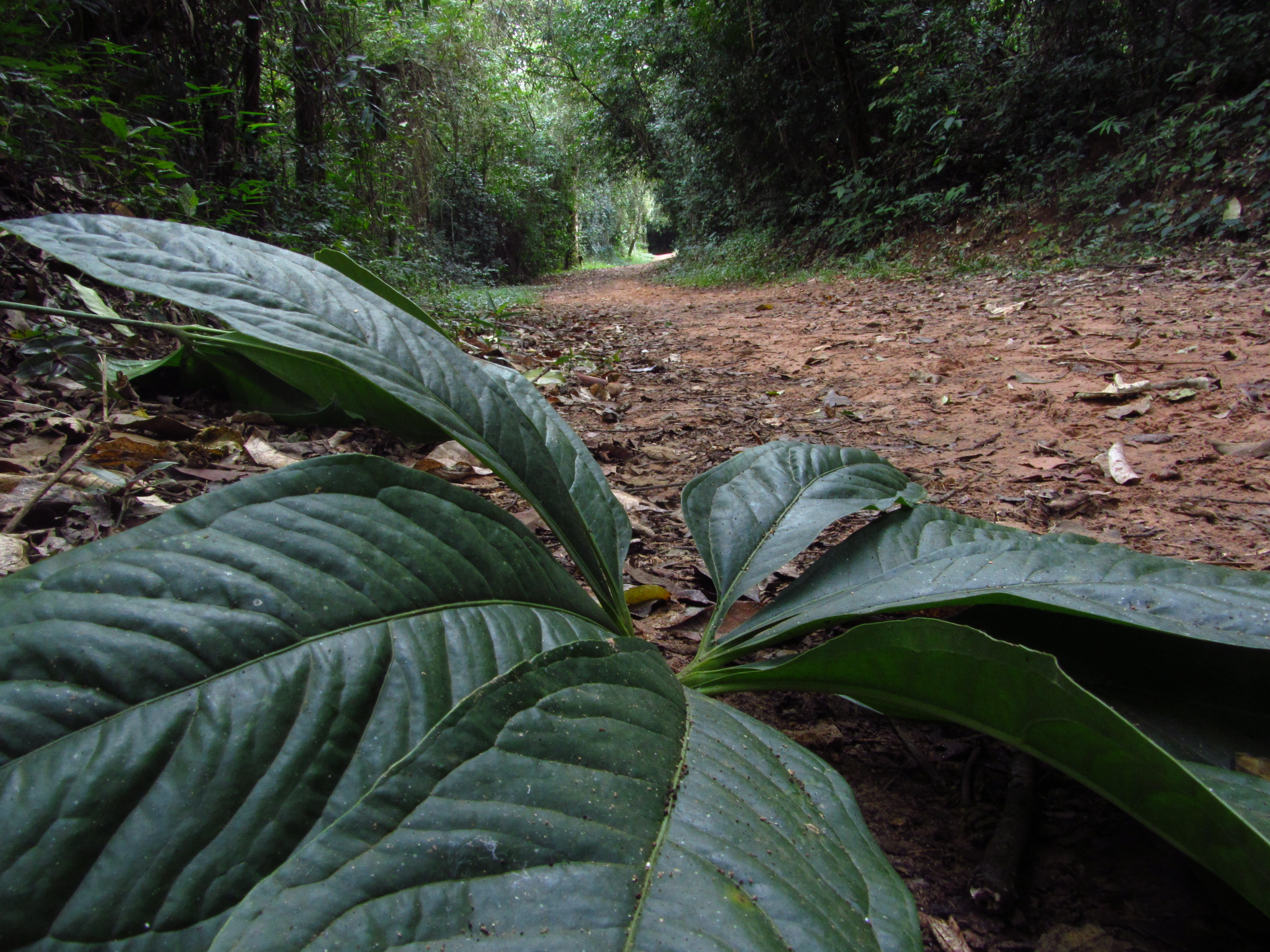
Trail in the park

Birds species include the yellow-headed caracara (Milvago chimachima), solitary tinamou (Tinamus solitarius), Amazon parrots, Muscovy duck (Cairina moschata), blue ground dove (Claravis pretiosa), violaceous quail-dove (Geotrygon violacea), chestnut-bellied seed finch (Oryzoborus angolensis), hummingbirds, toucans, pionus parrots, black-throated grosbeak (Saltator fuliginosus), rufous-bellied thrush (Turdus rufiventris), forpus parrots, great kiskadee (Pitangus sulphuratus), thraupis, woodpeckers, tataupa tinamou (Crypturellus tataupa), small-billed tinamou (Crypturellus parvirostris), partridges, seriemas, hawks and Cathartiformes.

Other birds observed in the park include the rufous-tailed jacamar (Galbula ruficauda), squirrel cuckoo (Piaya cayana), southern beardless tyrannulet (Camptostoma obsoletum), purple-throated euphonia (Euphonia chlorotica), grey-headed tanager (Eucometis penicillata), barred antshrike (Thamnophilus doliatus), pale-breasted thrush (Turdus leucomelas), toco toucan (Ramphastos toco), white-throated spadebill (Platyrinchus mystaceus), sepia-capped flycatcher (Leptopogon amaurocephalus), silver-beaked tanager (Ramphocelus carbo), planalto tyrannulet (Phyllomyias fasciatus), bananaquit (Coereba flaveola) and red-eyed vireo (Vireo olivaceus).

=== Mammals ===
Mammals include maned wolf (Chrysocyon brachyurus), pampas deer (Ozotoceros bezoarticus), cougar (Puma concolor), capybara (Hydrochoerus hydrochaeris), robust capuchin monkey, crab-eating raccoon (Procyon cancrivorus), bush dog (Speothos venaticus), oncilla (Leopardus tigrinus), common agouti, paca, tayra (Eira barbara) and neotropical otter (Lontra longicaudis).

== O Patriarca ==
The main attraction of the park is a giant jequitibá-rosa tree in the well-preserved cerrado of the 900 hectares (2,200 acres) Pé de Gigante section, which takes its name from a great depression in the interior shaped like a giant's foot. The tree, called "O Patriarca" (The Patriarch), is estimated to be 600 years old based on comparison to a neighboring jequitibá whose rings were counted and whose trunk was studied using carbon 14 dating, which gave an age of 400 years. O Patriarca is larger and has a thicker trunk, from which the age of 600 years is estimated. (Note: Some sources claim the tree is the oldest in Brazil. A G1 Globo article gives the age of O Patriarca as about 600 years. However, the municipality says it is 1,000 years old, and also says one of the owners once had a carbon 14 test that gave an estimated age of over 3,000 years. Other sources echo the age of 3,000 years.) It is 3.6 metres (12 ft) in diameter, 40 metres (130 ft) high and has a circumference of 11.5 metres (38 ft). Its deepest root goes down to 18 metres (59 ft) and its longest extends 30 metres (98 ft) to the side. Its gross weight has been estimated at 264 tons. The park holds about 330 specimens of this rare and imposing tree species.

== Sources ==
- "Jequitibá-rosa 'Patriarca', a árvore mais velha do Brasil", Norteando Você, 30 October 2015
- Korman, V. (2003), Proposta de interligação das glebas do parque estadual de Vassununga (Santa Rita do Passa Quatro, SP). (dissertation) (in Portuguese), Piracicaba: Universidade de São Paulo, doi:10.11606/D.91.2003.tde-24062005-103324
- Oliveira, Elida (5 February 2012), "O patriarca de 600 anos", Folha de S. Paulo (in Portuguese), São Paulo
- "O "Patriarca da Floresta"- Jequitibá-rosa do Parque Estadual Vassununga", Áreas Verdes das Cidades (in Portuguese), 11 November 2003
- Parque do Vassununga (in Portuguese), Santa Rita do Passa Quatro, archived from the original on 2016-11-29
- "Parque Vassununga é refúgio natural que abriga plantas raras e ameaçadas", G1 Globo (in Portuguese), 23 June 2016
- "Passarinhando no Parque Estadual de Vassununga", Passarinhóloga (in Portuguese)
- Sobre o Parque (in Portuguese), SAP: Sistema Ambiente Paulista
- Sobre o Parque (more) (in Portuguese), SAP: Sistema Ambiente Paulista
