= Aclimação =

- Neighborhood
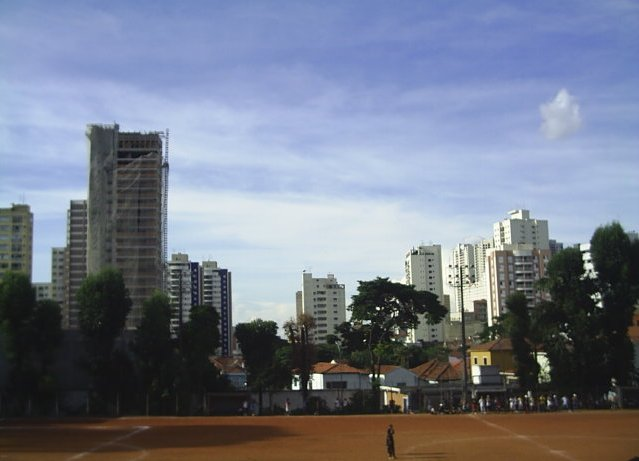

- Location within São Paulo Location within Brazil
- Coordinates: 23°34′17″S 46°37′43″W
- Country: Brazil
- Region: Southeast
- State: São Paulo
- Municipality: São Paulo
- Administrative Zone: Central
- Subprefecture: Sé
- District: Liberdade

Aclimação is a prosperous neighborhood in the central region of the city of São Paulo, Brazil. It is located in the municipal district of Liberdade, in the Sé Subprefecture.

It borders the neighborhoods: Paraíso, Liberdade, Vila Mariana, Vila Deodoro, Cambuci and Morro da Aclimação.

== History ==
Despite its central location, Aclimação is one of the newer neighborhoods in downtown São Paulo, developed settled only in the 20th century. The neighborhood has grown up on a winding hilly triangular-shaped area of land known as the Sítio Tapanhoin, bounded on its three sides by the Caminho do Mar highway to the port of Santos and the Lavapés and Cambuci rivers.

The land was purchased in 1892 by Carlos Botelho, a doctor born in Piracicaba and trained in Paris, who was anxious to pursue an ambition he had developed during his time in France to create a Brazilian equivalent of the "Jardin d’Acclimatation" in Paris, a place used for the acclimation of exotic species, with a research center for animal reproduction and hybridization and including a zoo among its various attractions. Inspired by the French model, he named his property the Jardim da Aclimação, from which both the Aclimação Park and the neighborhood as a whole take their names.

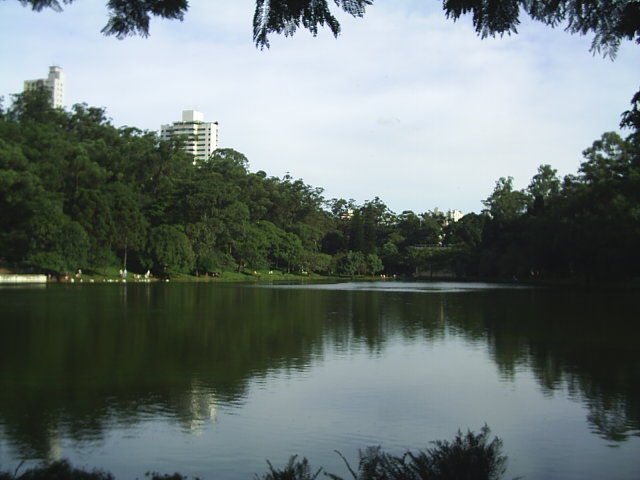
Parque da Aclimação is one of the most well-known parks in São Paulo

For 30 years, up until the 1920s, the Garden, which was much larger than it is today, was one of the city's most popular attractions. Botelho developed it into a place of recreation and research. It was used as a quarantine station for cattle imported from the Netherlands. Visitors to the Garden's "creamery" were able to drink milk fresh from the cow or purchase dairy produce like cream and cheese. Before moving to Brooklin Novo, the Brazilian Equestrian Society (Sociedade Hípica Paulista) had its headquarters in the Garden, where there was also a livestock improvement station and a scientific research laboratory.

For recreation, there was the wood, a canoeing lake created by damming the streams running through the area, the city's first zoo, complete with bears, lions, monkeys, elephants, jaguars and other animals, as well as a dance hall, a skating rink, fairground stalls, an aquarium, and an amusement park. Visitors paid 300 reais to enter. As there were few people living nearby the Jardim da Aclimação could only be reached by public transport on Sundays and public holidays when the No. 28 tram ran to the Gardens from the Sé.

Adjoining the Garden were extensive private grounds belonging to the Botelho family. During the 1930s, Botelho's children, to whom he had transferred ownership of the property after deciding to follow a career in politics a few years earlier, began to build on the land. In 1938, hearing that they were having difficulty keeping up with the cost of maintaining the Jardim da Aclimação and planning to build on it, the Mayor of São Paulo, Prestes Maia, offered to purchase the property from them.

On 16 January 1939, Botelho's heirs, Antônio Carlos de Arruda Botelho, Constança Botelho de Macedo Costa, and Carlos José Botelho Júnior, formalized the sale of an area of 182 thousand square meters to the Prefecture of São Paulo, for the sum of 2,850 million reais. Paradoxically, rather than signaling the rebirth of the Jardim da Aclimação, the purchase spelled out the definitive end for most of its attractions and the beginning of a long period of alternating neglect and revival for the green open space.

== Initial construction and high-rise redevelopment ==
Even while the Jardim da Aclimação was still a flourishing attraction, a residential neighborhood was starting to take shape around it. In 1900 the only roads and avenues in the area were the ones marking its boundaries, including the Rua Vergueiro, the Rua Lins de Vasconcelos and the Rua Tamandaré. By 1905, the Rua Pires da Mota, Rua Cururipe, Rua Espírito Santo, Rua José Getúlio, Rua Baturité, and the first section of the present-day Avenida da Aclimação had been laid out. In 1914, the Rua Machado de Assis and part of the Rua Paula Ney and the Rua José do Patrocínio had appeared on the map.

Nevertheless, between these roads built on the steepest part of the property, known as the Morro da Aclimação, originally belonging to the family of Francisco Justino da Silva, and the Rua Lins de Vasconcelos, the Avenida da Aclimação, and the Jardim da Aclimação, all that existed was an almost rural landscape dominated by scrubland, streams, fields, and farm buildings.

In 1916, again reflecting the irregular contours of the area, a series of roads were built in a semicircular arc off the Avenida da Aclimação and converging on the Largo Rodrigues Alves, the present Praça General Polidoro. These were all named after precious stones—Turmalina, Topázio, Diamante, Ágata, Safira, Esmeralda, Rubi, etc. Higher up, in the direction of the Rua Nilo, the street names took their inspiration from the planets of the Solar System: Júpiter, Urano, Saturno. It was not until 1928 that the maps show an increasing number of buildings appearing on the Morro da Aclimação between the Rua Jurubatuba (now Avenida Armando Ferrentini) and the Vila Mariana cemetery.

A middle-class residential neighborhood sprang up, dominated by single and multi-story houses occupied by Italians, Japanese, Portuguese and natives of the city of São Paulo itself. The administrative Subdistrict of Aclimação was created in 1938 but was abolished in 1986 when the municipality of São Paulo was reorganized into 96 Districts. However, there is still a Civil Registry for the Subdistrict of Aclimação, established by the legal authorities at State level.

From the 1970s onwards, the onward march of construction led to increasing numbers of new buildings, as the neighborhood became more and more dominated by high-rise construction. The increase in population was followed by the establishment of banks, schools, shops, estate agents and other services attending to the needs of the local population. Along the major roads like the Avenida da Aclimação, very few private homes have managed to survive the onslaught of the property developers.

== Aclimação today ==
Because of its location, the neighborhood has become increasingly popular with estate agents catering to the upper middle class and has become increasingly sought after. The "property boom" has put pressure on transport facilities and resulted in the disappearance of the features that gave the neighborhood its former character including the semi-detached houses and the old multi-storey homes. The area has also undergone a socio-economic transformation, from a middle-class to an upper-middle-class neighborhood, as it has become an increasingly sought-after place to live

Aclimação is a stronghold of São Paulo's South Korean community. The Praça General Polidoro square is surrounded by Korean restaurants, churches and other businesses. According to local real estate surveys 30% of the area's resident population are Korean or of Korean origin. One possible explanation is the presence of Presbyterian churches nearby as most of the Koreans are Protestant Christians and also because of its proximity to the neighbourhood of Liberdade, a typical asian neighbourhood in the city.
