= Monjolos =

Human settlement in Brazil

Coordinates: 18°19′33″S 44°07′08″W

- Municipality
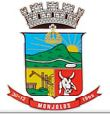
- Coat of arms
- Interactive map of Monjolos
- Country: Brazil
- State: Minas Gerais
- Region: Southeast

Population (2022 Census)
  - Total: 2,169
  - Estimate (2025): 2,187
- Time zone: UTC−3 (BRT)

Location of Monjolos in the state of Minas Gerais

Monjolos is a Brazilian municipality located in the northeast of the state of Minas Gerais. Its population in 2020 was 2,202, with a total area of 652 square kilometres (252 sq mi). The city belongs to the statistical mesoregion of Central Mineira and to the statistical microregion of Curvelo. It became a municipality in 1962.

Monjolos is located at an elevation of 560 metres (1,840 ft) east of the Rio das Velhas, an important tributary of the São Francisco River. It is connected to the nearest major population center, Curvelo, by state highway MG-220. In 2001, this highway was not paved. The distance to Curvelo is 50 kilometres (31 mi), and the distance to the state capital, Belo Horizonte, is 247 kilometres (153 mi). Neighboring municipalities are Santo Hipólito, Gouveia, Diamantina, and Augusto de Lima.

The main economic activities are services, small industries, and agriculture. The production of charcoal from eucalyptus plantations is also important. The GDP in 2005 was R$12 million, with 6 million from services, 700 thousand from industry and 5 million from agriculture. There were 164 rural producers on 17,000 hectares (42,000 acres) of land. Only 22 farms had tractors in 2006. Approximately 600 persons were dependent on agriculture; the main crops were beans and corn. There were 17,600 head of cattle in 2006. There were no banks in 2007 and 29 automobiles and 36 motorcycles, giving a ratio of 79 inhabitants per automobile. This is much lower than the state average.

There were two health clinics. Patients with more serious health conditions are transported to Montes Claros or Curvelo. Educational needs were met by two primary schools, a middle school and a pre-primary school.

- Municipal Human Development Index: 0.676 in 2000
- State ranking: 651 out of 853 municipalities in 2000
- National ranking: 3,353 out of 5,138 municipalities in 2000
- Literacy rate: 76%
- Life expectancy: 65 (average of males and females)

In 2000, the per capita income of R$145.00 was well below the state and national average of R$276.00 and R$297.00, respectively.

The highest ranking municipality in Minas Gerais in 2000 was Poços de Caldas with 0.841, while the lowest was Setubinha with 0.568. Nationally, the highest was São Caetano do Sul in São Paulo with 0.919, while the lowest was Setubinha. In more recent statistics (considering 5,507 municipalities) Manari in the state of Pernambuco has the lowest rating in the country - 0.467 - putting it in last place.

== See also ==
- List of municipalities in Minas Gerais
