= Corinto, Minas Gerais =

Municipality of Minas Gerais, Brazil

Coordinates: 18°22′51″S 44°27′21″W

Corinto
- Municipality
- Municipality of Corinto
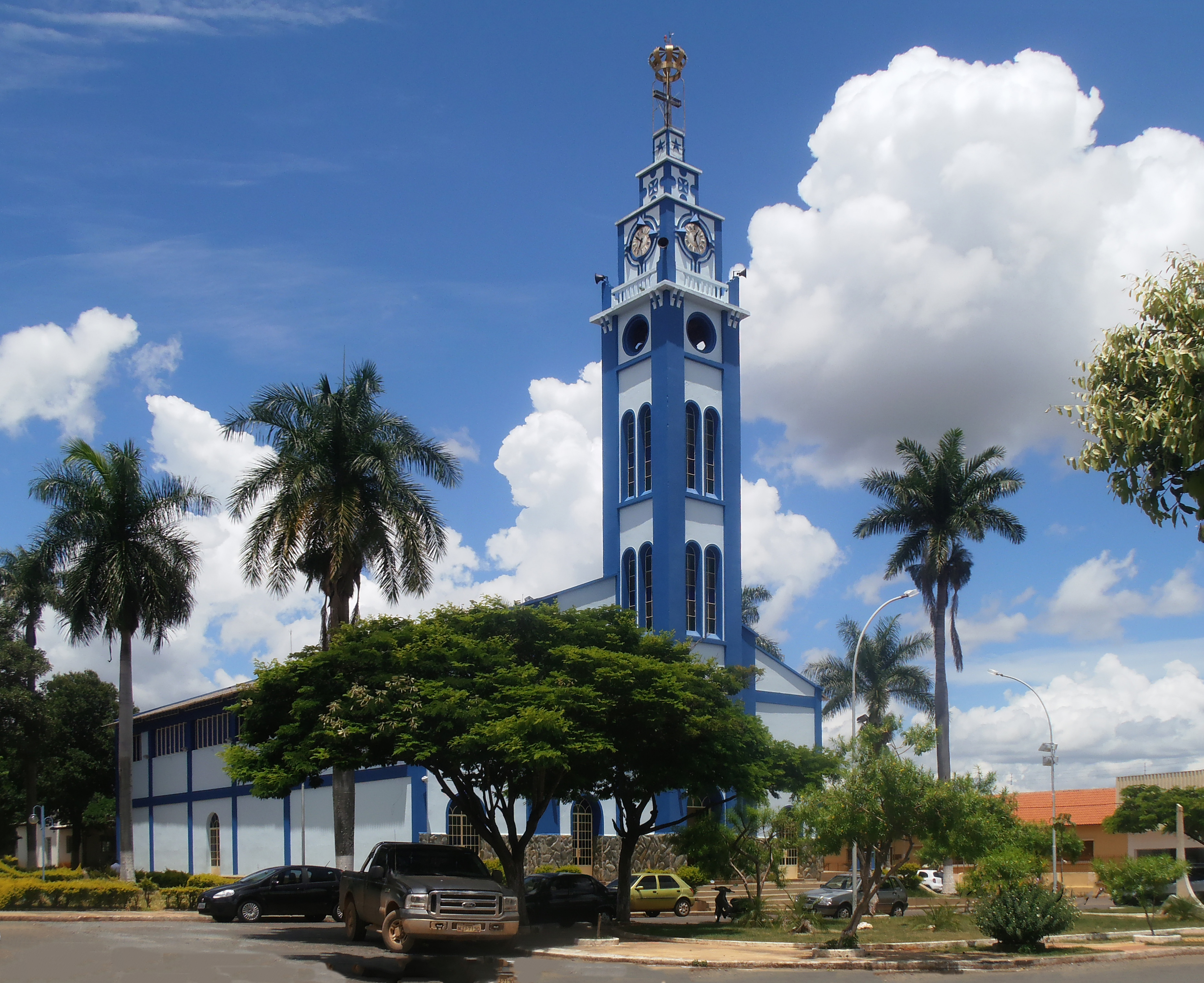
- Mother Church of Corinto

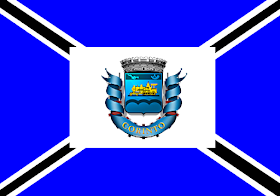
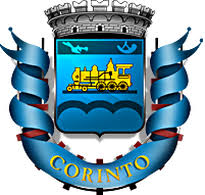
- Flag Coat of arms

- Location in Minas Gerais
- Country: Brazil
- State: Minas Gerais
- Region: Southeast
- Intermediate Region: Belo Horizonte
- Immediate Region: Curvelo
- Founded: 14 September 1891

Government
  - Mayor: Evaldo Paulo dos Reis (MDB)

Area
  - Total: 2,525.397 km^{2} (975.061 sq mi)
- Elevation: 698 m (2,290 ft)

Population (2022 Census)
  - Total: 23,532
  - Estimate (2025): 23,988
  - Density: 9.3181/km^{2} (24.134/sq mi)
- Demonym: corintiano
- Time zone: UTC−3 (BRT)
- Postal Code: 39200-000 to 39204-999
- HDI (2010): 0.680 – medium
- Website: corinto.mg.gov.br

Corinto is a Brazilian municipality in the northeast of the state of Minas Gerais. Its population as of 2025 was 23,988 living in a total area of 2,525 km^{2}. The city belongs to the statistical mesoregion of Central Mineira and to the statistical microregion of Curvelo. It became a municipality in 1923.

Corinto is at an elevation of 608 meters on highway BR-135 between Curvelo and Montes Claros. The nearest major population center is Curvelo. The town began with the building of the railroad from Belo Horizonte to Montes Claros in 1910.

The distance to Curvelo is 30 km; and the distance to the state capital, Belo Horizonte, is 205 km. Neighboring municipalities are: Augusto de Lima, Curvelo, Felixlândia, Lassance, Morro da Garça, Santo Hipólito and Três Marias.

== Economic activities ==
The main economic activities are services, small industries, and agriculture. The GDP in 2005 was R$108 million, with 69 million from services, 10 million from industry, and 22 million from agriculture. There were 580 rural producers on 97,000 hectares of land. Only 115 farms had tractors (2006). Approximately 1,300 persons were dependent on agriculture. The main crops were rice, beans, and corn. There were 67,000 head of cattle (2006). There were 4 banks (2007) and 2,260 automobiles (1,283 motorcycles), giving a ratio of 10 inhabitants per automobile.

== Health ==
There were 16 health clinics and 1 hospital with 60 beds in 2005. Patients with more serious health conditions are transported to Montes Claros or Curvelo. Educational needs were met by 13 primary schools, 1 middle school, and 2 pre-primary schools.

== Statistics ==
- Municipal Human Development Index: 0.722 (2000)
- State ranking: 452 out of 853 municipalities as of 2000
- National ranking: 2,572 out of 5,138 municipalities as of 2000
- Literacy rate: 86%
- Life expectancy: 66 (average of males and females)

In 2000 the per capita income of R$191.00 was well below the state and national average of R$276.00 and R$297.00 respectively.

The highest ranking municipality in Minas Gerais in 2000 was Poços de Caldas with 0.841, while the lowest was Setubinha with 0.568. Nationally the highest was São Caetano do Sul in São Paulo with 0.919, while the lowest was Setubinha. In more recent statistics (considering 5,507 municipalities) Manari in the state of Pernambuco has the lowest rating in the country—0,467—putting it in last place.

== See also ==
- List of municipalities in Minas Gerais
