= Notícias Populares =

Brazilian newspaper

Notícias Populares (Popular News in Portuguese), also referred simply as NP, was a Brazilian sensationalist tabloid newspaper published by Empresa Folha da Manhã from 1963 to 2001. Notícias Populares was known by publishing stories about crime, sex and violence in a graphic manner. It was also notorious for publishing hoaxes such as of the Devil Baby.

== History ==
The newspaper was established in 1963 by Herbert Levy, president of the National Democratic Union political party and owner of the business newspaper Gazeta Mercantil. His aim was to compete with the left-leaning paper Última Hora. The first issue of Notícias Populares was published on October 15, 1963, with a circulation of 15,000 copies. Its first publisher was Jean Mellé, a Romanian-born citizen. The newspaper was sold in 1965 to Folha da Manhã, publisher of Folha de S. Paulo.

Notícias Populares' last edition was published on January 20, 2001.
