= BR-259 (Brazil highway) =

Highway in Brazil

BR-259

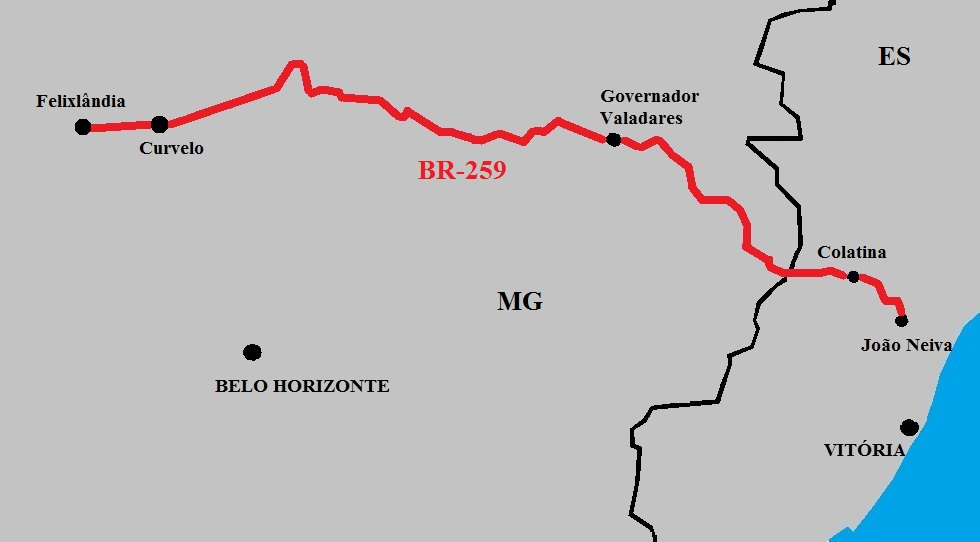

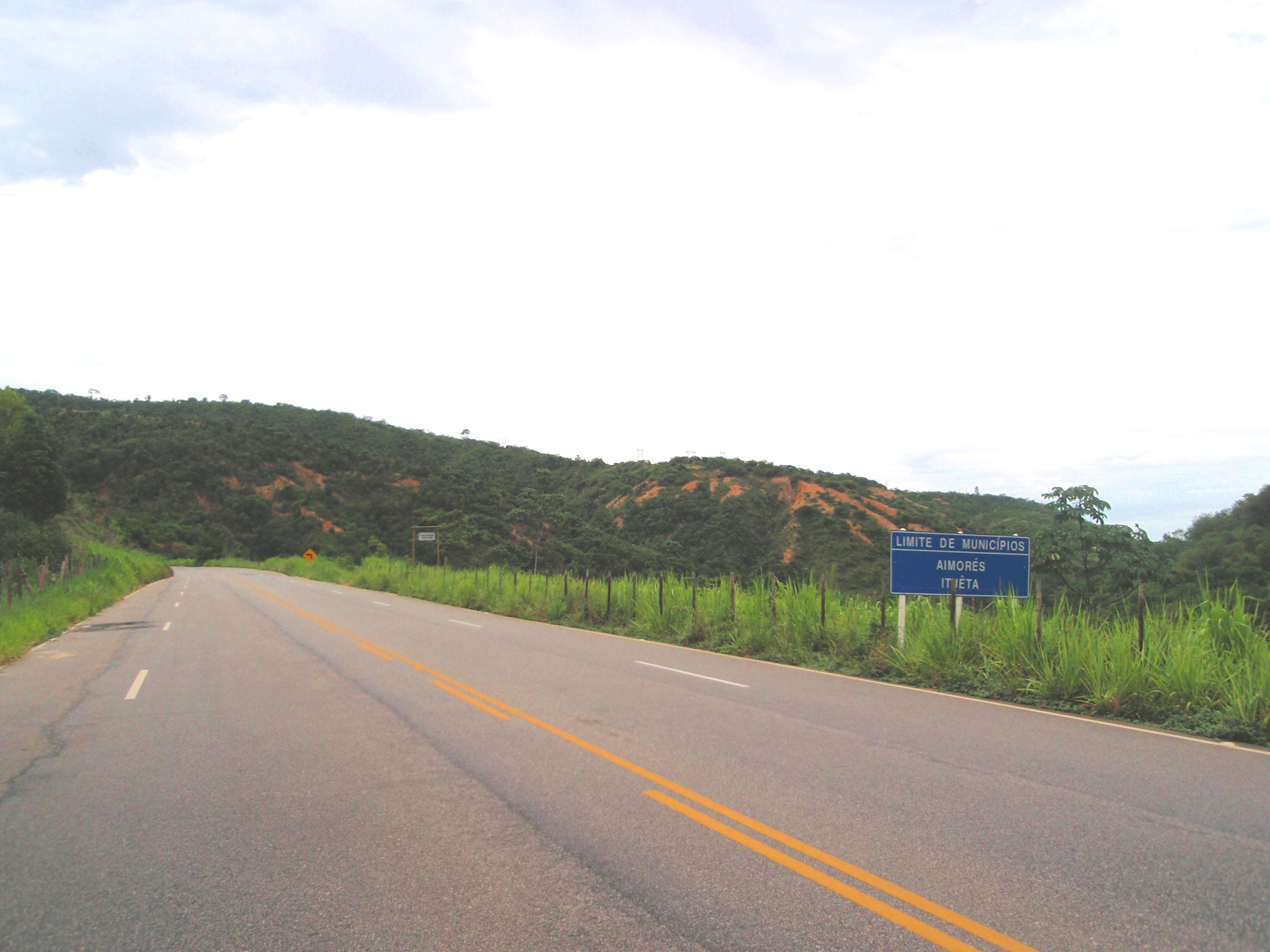
- BR-259 between Itueta and Aimorés

Route information
- Length: 711.7 km (442.2 mi)

Major junctions
- west end: Felixlândia, Minas Gerais
- east end: João Neiva, Espírito Santo

Location
- Country: Brazil

Highway system
- Highways in Brazil; Federal

BR-259 is a federal highway in southeastern Brazil. The road covers 711.7 km from Felixlândia, Minas Gerais to João Neiva, Espírito Santo.
