= Morro da Garça =

Human settlement in Brazil

Coordinates: 18°32′49″S 44°36′10″W

- Municipality
- Interactive map of Morro da Garça
- Country: Brazil
- State: Minas Gerais
- Region: Southeast

Population (2022 Census)
  - Total: 2,411
  - Estimate (2025): 2,426
- Time zone: UTC−3 (BRT)

Location of Morro da Garça in the state of Minas Gerais

Morro da Garça is a Brazilian municipality located in the northeast of the state of Minas Gerais. Its population as of 2020 was 2,437 living in a total area of 414 km^{2}. The city belongs to the statistical mesoregion of Central Mineira and to the statistical microregion of Curvelo. It became a municipality in 1962.

== Overview ==
Morro da Garça is located at an elevation of 600 meters, 15 km. west of important highway BR-135. The distance to Curvelo is 36 km., and the distance to the state capital, Belo Horizonte, is 210 km. Neighboring municipalities are: Corinto, Curvelo and Felixlândia. The name comes from a nearby hill.

The main economic activities are services, small industries, and agriculture. The production of charcoal from eucalyptus plantations is also important. The GDP in 2005 was R$19 million, with 8 million from services, 1 million from industry, and 8 million from agriculture. There were 235 rural producers on 27,000 hectares of land. Only 45 farms had tractors (2006). Approximately 700 persons were dependent on agriculture. The main crops were beans and corn. There were 27,000 head of cattle (2006). There were no banks (2007) and 152 automobiles (110 motorcycles), giving a ratio of 29 inhabitants per automobile.

There were 2 health clinics. Patients with more serious health conditions are transported to Curvelo. Educational needs were met by 4 primary schools, 1 middle school, and 2 pre-primary schools.

- Municipal Human Development Index: 0.680 (2000)
- State ranking: 634 out of 853 municipalities as of 2000
- National ranking: 3,291 out of 5,138 municipalities as of 2000
- Literacy rate: 82%
- Life expectancy: 65 (average of males and females)

In 2000 the per capita income of R$129.00 was well below the state and national average of R$276.00 and R$297.00 respectively.

The highest ranking municipality in Minas Gerais in 2000 was Poços de Caldas with 0.841, while the lowest was Setubinha with 0.568. Nationally the highest was São Caetano do Sul in São Paulo with 0.919, while the lowest was Setubinha. In more recent statistics (considering 5,507 municipalities) Manari in the state of Pernambuco has the lowest rating in the country—0,467—putting it in last place.

== See also ==
- List of municipalities in Minas Gerais
