= Augusto de Lima, Minas Gerais =

Municipality of Brazil

Coordinates: 18°06′32″S 44°16′01″W

- Municipality
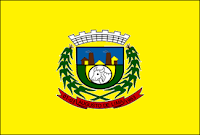
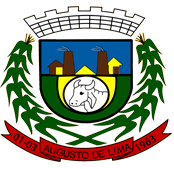
- Flag Coat of arms
- Interactive map of Augusto de Lima, Minas Gerais
- Country: Brazil
- State: Minas Gerais
- Region: Southeast

Population (2022 Census)
  - Total: 4,538
  - Estimate (2025): 4,572
- Time zone: UTC−3 (BRT)

Location of Augusto de Lima in the state of Minas Gerais

Augusto de Lima is a Brazilian municipality located in the northeast of the state of Minas Gerais. Its population as of 2025 was 4,572 living in a total area of 1,254 km^{2}. The city belongs to the statistical mesoregion of Central Mineira and to the statistical microregion of Curvelo. It became a municipality in 1963.

== Geography ==
Augusto de Lima is located at an elevation of 700 metres on highway BR-135 between Curvelo and Montes Claros. The nearest major population centre is Curvelo. The town began with the building of the railroad from Belo Horizonte to Montes Claros in 1910. The name is derived from the name of a writer and politician. See Augusto de Lima.

The distance to Curvelo is 112 km; and the distance to the state capital, Belo Horizonte, is 240 km. Neighboring municipalities are: Buenópolis, Diamantina, Monjolos, Corinto and Lassance.

== Economy ==
The main economic activities are services and agriculture. The GDP in 2005 was R$39 million, with 24 million from services, 2 million from industry, and 10 million from agriculture. There were 354 rural producers on 14,000 hectares of land. Only 8 farms had tractors (2006). Approximately 800 persons were dependent on agriculture. The main crops were mangoes, sugarcane, beans, and corn. There were 27,000 head of cattle (2006). There was 1 bank (2007) and 666 automobiles (366 motorcycles), giving a ratio of 14 inhabitants per automobile.

== Health and education ==
There were 3 health clinics in 2005. Patients with more serious health conditions are transported to Bocaiúva, Montes Claros or Curvelo. Educational needs were met by 16 primary schools, 2 middle schools, and 9 pre-primary schools.

- Municipal Human Development Index: 0.690 (2000)
- State ranking: 642 out of 853 municipalities as of 2000
- National ranking: 3,319 out of 5,138 municipalities as of 2000
- Literacy rate: 77%
- Life expectancy: 65 (average of males and females)

In 2000 the per capita income of R$149.00 was well below the state and national average of R$276.00 and R$297.00 respectively.

The highest ranking municipality in Minas Gerais in 2000 was Poços de Caldas with 0.841, while the lowest was Setubinha with 0.568. Nationally the highest was São Caetano do Sul in São Paulo with 0.919, while the lowest was Setubinha. In more recent statistics (considering 5,507 municipalities) Manari in the state of Pernambuco has the lowest rating in the country—0,467—putting it in last place.

== See also ==
- List of municipalities in Minas Gerais
