= João Neiva =

Coordinates: 19°45′28″S 40°23′09″W

- Municipality
- The Municipality of João Neiva do Espírito Santo
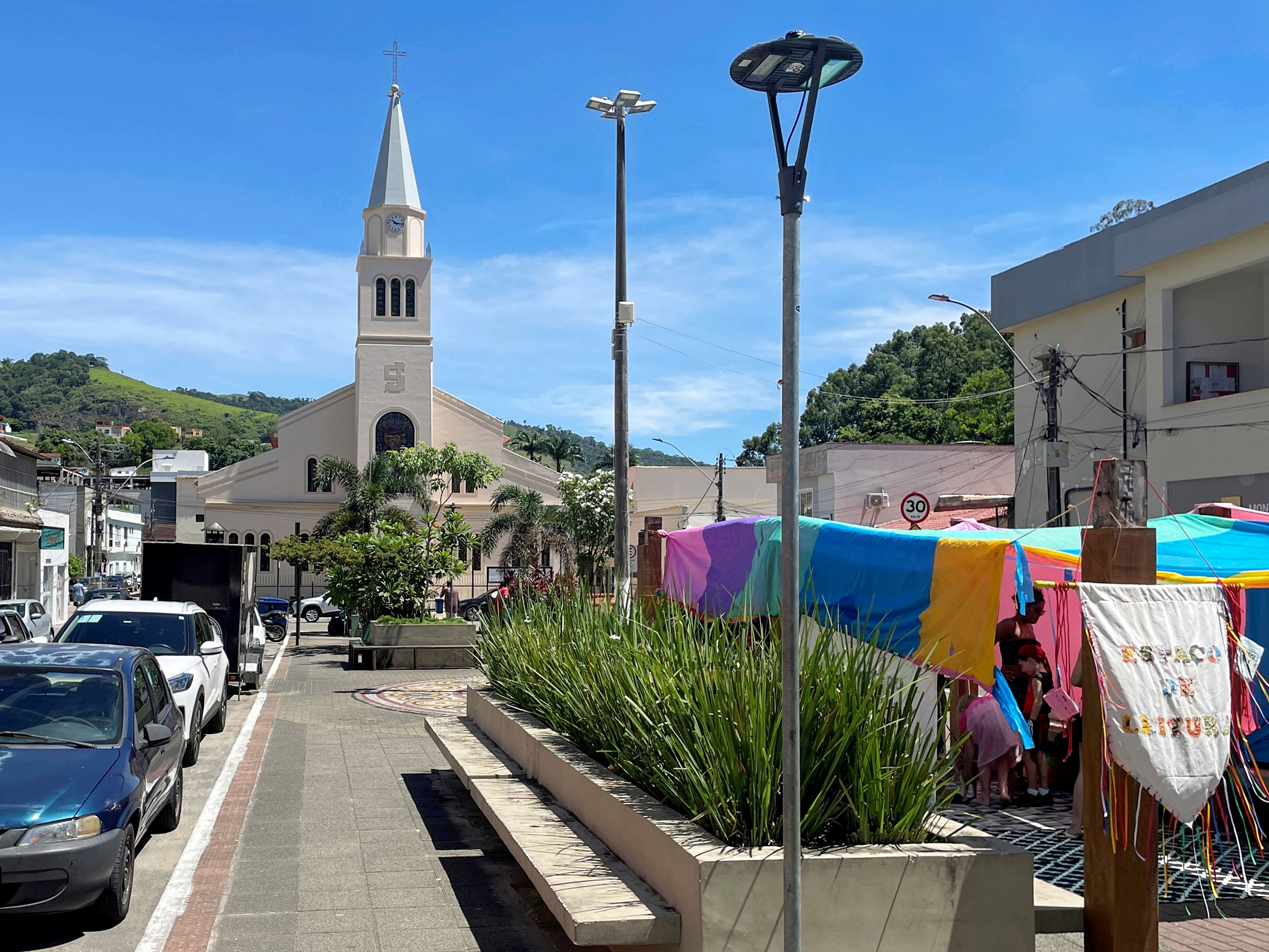
- Nossa Senhora do Líbano Square with the Saint Joseph Matriz Church in the background in João Neiva

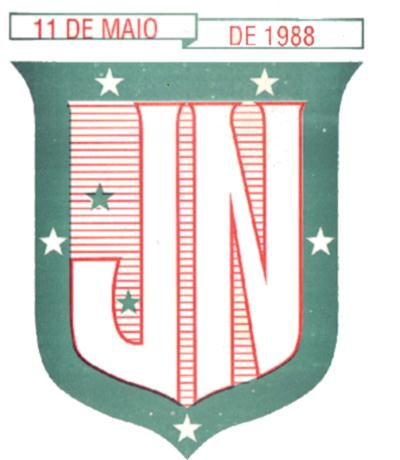
- Flag Coat of arms

- Location in the State of Espírito Santo

- Country: Brazil
- Region: Southeast
- State: Espírito Santo
- Founded: 1988

Government
  - Mayor: Romero Gobbo Figueiredo (PT)

Area
  - Total: 272.865 km^{2} (105.354 sq mi)

Population (2020)
  - Total: 16,722
  - Density: 5,793/km^{2} (15,000/sq mi)
- Time zone: UTC-3 (BRT)
- Postal Code: 29680-000
- Website: João Neiva, Espírito Santo

João Neiva is a municipality located in the Brazilian state of Espírito Santo. Its population was 16,722 (2020) and its area is 273 km^{2} (105 sq mi).
