= Felixlândia =

- Municipality
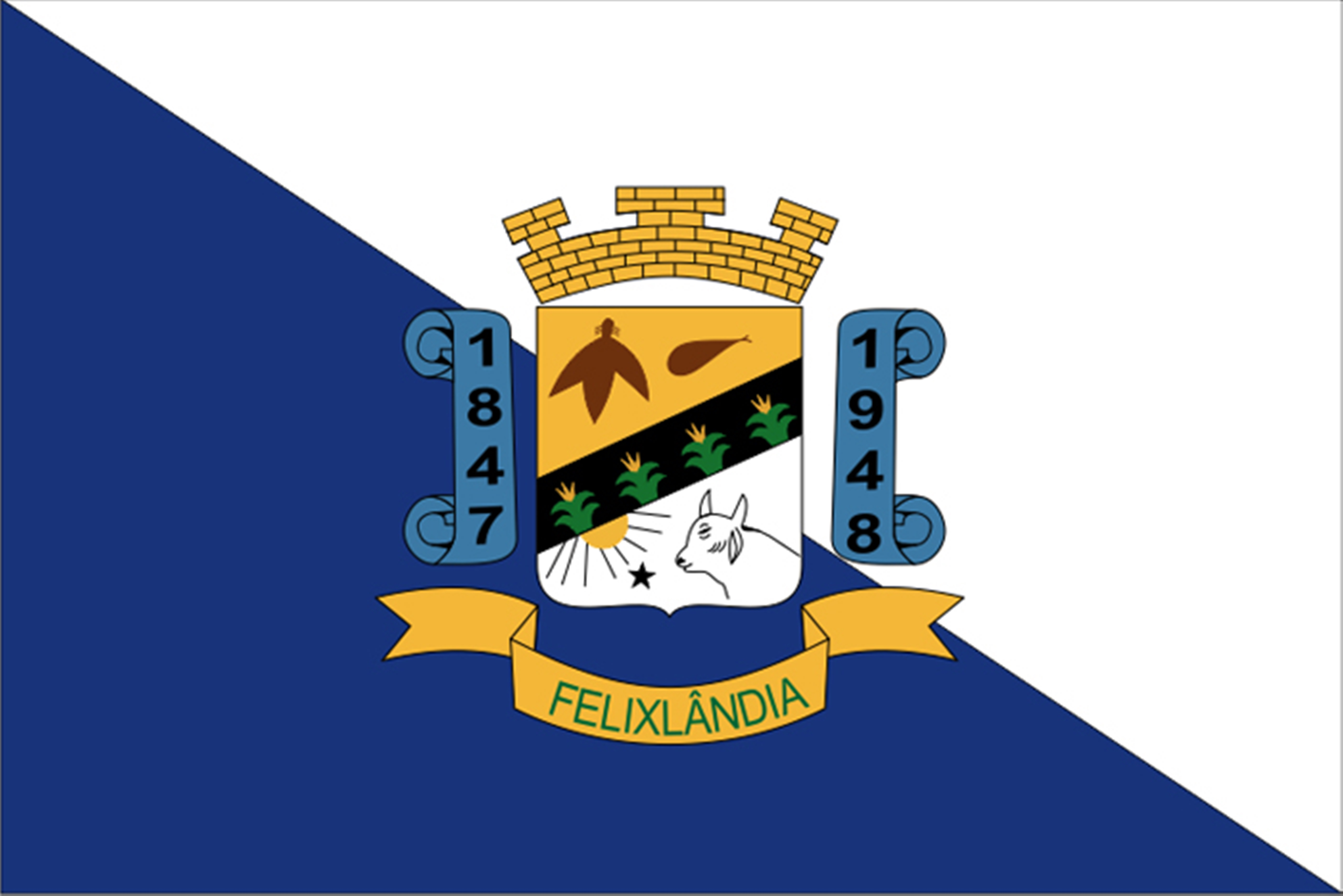
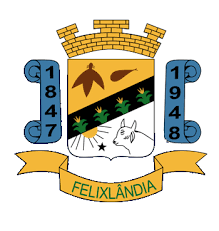
- Flag Coat of arms

- Location of Felixlândia in the state of Minas Gerais

- Location in Brazil
- Coordinates: 18.758°S 44.899°W
- Country: Brazil
- State: Minas Gerais

Area
  - Total: 1,553 km^{2} (600 sq mi)

Population (2022 Census)
  - Total: 13,978
  - Estimate (2025): 14,280
  - Density: 9.001/km^{2} (23.31/sq mi)
- Time zone: UTC−3 (BRT)

Felixlândia is a Brazilian municipality located in the northeast of the state of Minas Gerais. Its population as of 2025 was 14,280 living in a total area of 1,554 square kilometres (600 sq mi). The city belongs to the statistical mesoregion of Central Mineira and to the statistical microregion of Curvelo. It became a municipality in 1948.

== Geography ==
Felixlândia is located at an elevation of 608 metres on highway BR-040 (Rio-Brasília) between Tres Marias and Sete Lagoas. It forms a boundary on the west with the Tres Marias Reservoir. The nearest major population centre is Curvelo. The name of the municipality is a tribute to Father Felix Ferreira da Rocha, who donated land for the construction of a chapel for Nossa Senhora da Piedade, the patron saint of the town. An annual festival is given in her honor every August.

The distance to Curvelo is 45 km; and the distance to the state capital, Belo Horizonte, is 196 km. Neighboring municipalities are: Curvelo, Pompéu, Morro da Garça, Morada Nova de Minas, Corinto, and Três Marias.

== Economy ==
The main economic activities are services, small industries, and agriculture. The production of charcoal from eucalyptus plantations is also important. The GDP in 2005 was R$70 million, with 38 million from services, 9 million from industry, and 19 million from agriculture. There were 691 rural producers on 105,000 hectares of land. Only 116 farms had tractors (2006). Approximately 2,200 persons were dependent on agriculture. The main crops were rice, sugarcane, beans, manioc, and corn. There were 53,000 head of cattle (2006). There was 1 bank (2007) and 1,049 automobiles (542 motorcycles), giving a ratio of 13 inhabitants per automobile.

There were 7 health clinics and 1 hospital with 20 beds in 2005. Patients with more serious health conditions are transported to Belo Horizonte or Curvelo. Educational needs were met by 10 primary schools, 2 middle schools, and 8 pre-primary schools.

- Municipal Human Development Index: 0.730 (2000)
- State ranking: 424 out of 853 municipalities as of 2000
- National ranking: 2,436 out of 5,138 municipalities as of 2000
- Literacy rate: 84%
- Life expectancy: 70 (average of males and females)

In 2000 the per capita income of R$150.00 was well below the state and national average of R$276.00 and R$297.00 respectively.

The highest ranking municipality in Minas Gerais in 2000 was Poços de Caldas with 0.841, while the lowest was Setubinha with 0.568. Nationally the highest was São Caetano do Sul in São Paulo with 0.919, while the lowest was Setubinha. In more recent statistics (considering 5,507 municipalities) Manari in the state of Pernambuco has the lowest rating in the country—0,467—putting it in last place.

The municipality contained the 5,030 hectares (12,400 acres) Colônia 31 de Março Biological Reserve. An audit in 2012 stated that a number of biological reserves created in 1974 on state-owned land no longer qualified as conservation units. These included Carmo da Mata, Colônia 31 de Março and others.

== See also ==
- List of municipalities in Minas Gerais
