= Itacoatiara =

Neighborhood in Niterói, Brazil

Coordinates: 22°58′29″S 43°02′00″W

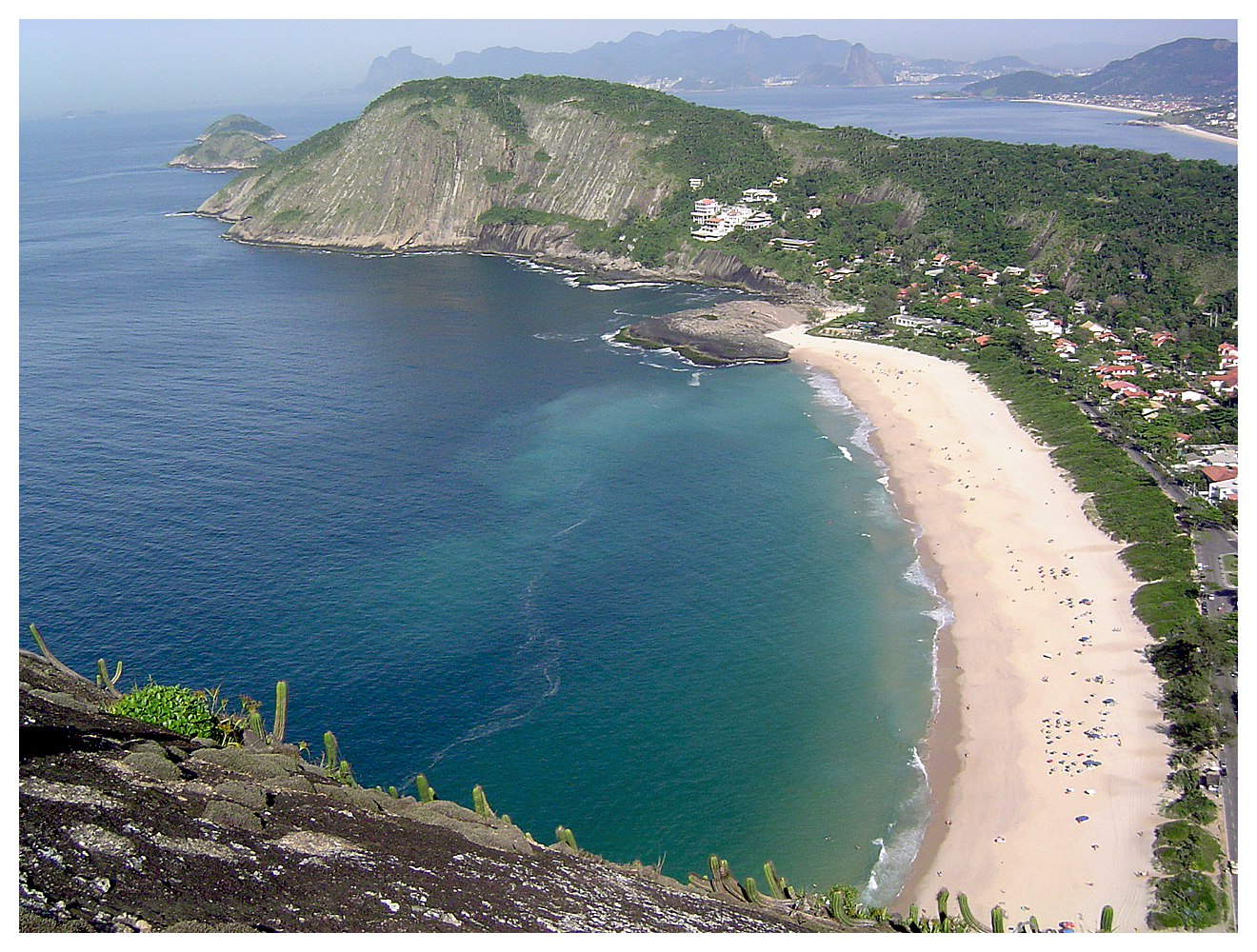
Itacoatiara beach, Niterói

Itacoatiara is one of the 48 official neighborhoods into which the city of Niterói, Rio de Janeiro in Brazil is divided.

== Beach ==
Itacoatiara beach is located about 30 minutes east of downtown Niterói by car, or one hour by bus.

Itacoatiara is a beach with fine golden sands and bright blue (sometimes green) water. The main beach is open to the Atlantic Ocean and is dangerous for the casual swimmer while offering ideal conditions for water sports. The left side of the beach ends with a rock face called Costão, and there is a wave-sheltered small beach on the right side called Prainha (little beach), which is separated from the main beach by a big rock that serves as its shelter, and which is frequented by small children and their parents.

=== Surfing ===
The place is famous for offering the ideal conditions for the practices of surfing, bodysurfing and bodyboarding during most of the year. It hosts surfing events such as the Niterói Surf Association (ASN) Circuit and bodyboarding events such as the Itacoatiara Pro Brazil Series.

At Itacoatiara, the Atlantic Ocean produces fast and hollow waves, usually ranging from 3 to 6 feet, but on frequent occasions they might swell up to 4 meters (12 feet). A few times per year a huge southeast swell can produce larger waves of up to 5 meters (15 feet) but a swell that strong rarely offers acceptable surfing conditions.

There are three main beach breaks in the beach. They are named Costão (on the left side), Meio (middle) and Pampo (on the right side), each breaking differently depending on swell direction and size. Behind the limiting rock between the main beach and the small, wave-sheltered Prainha (little beach), there is a point break named Shock due to its extremely dangerous surfing conditions, with rocks protruding from the sea floor above the water level. Shock starts working on bigger swells.

=== Climbing ===
Itacoatiara is a place especially appreciated by the climbers and offers many routes of different climbing styles. Bouldering is practiced at the square commonly called "Pracinha". The Serra da Tiririca State Park is also located there and was recognised by UNESCO as a World Biosphere Reserve. It offers many climbing routes of abseiling and of the following different styles: traditional climbing, sport climbing and aid climbing.
