= Barracão =

Barracão may refer to:

- Barracão, Rio Grande do Sul, Brazil
- Barracão, Paraná, Brazil
- Alfredo Wagner, Santa Catarina, Brazil, formerly known as Barracão
- Barracão (candomblé), site for public candomblé celebrations
