= State park (Brazil) =

Type of state-managed protected area in Brazil

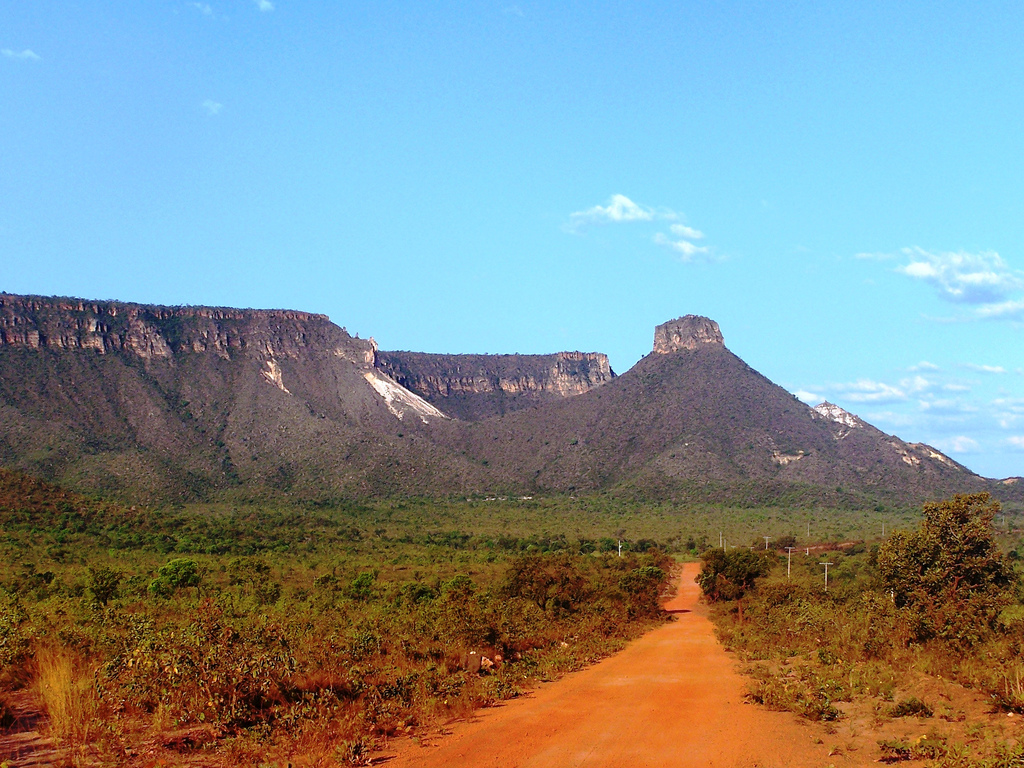
Jalapão State Park

A state park (Portuguese: Parque Estadual) in Brazil is a legally defined type of protected area operated by one of the states. Their goal is to preserve important or beautiful natural ecosystems. Public access is allowed subject to regulations defined by the responsible agency.

== Definition ==
State parks fall under the same regulations as national parks, defined by law 9.985 of July 2000. The park's basic objective is preservation of natural ecosystems of great ecological relevance and scenic beauty. This enables the conduct of scientific research and the development of educational activities and environmental interpretation, recreation in contact with nature and eco tourism. The park is publicly owned, and private areas included in its limits will be expropriated when it is established. Public visitation is subject to the rules and restrictions set out in Unit Management Plan, rules established by the body responsible for its administration, and those provided for by regulation. Scientific research requires prior authorization from the agency responsible for managing the unit and is subject to conditions and restrictions established by the agency.

State parks are classed as IUCN protected area category II (national park). They are administered by the government institute of each state responsible for the environment. For example, in São Paulo they are administered by the Instituto Florestal (Forest Institute) and in Rio de Janeiro by the Instituto Estadual do Ambiente (State Environment Institute).

== Examples ==
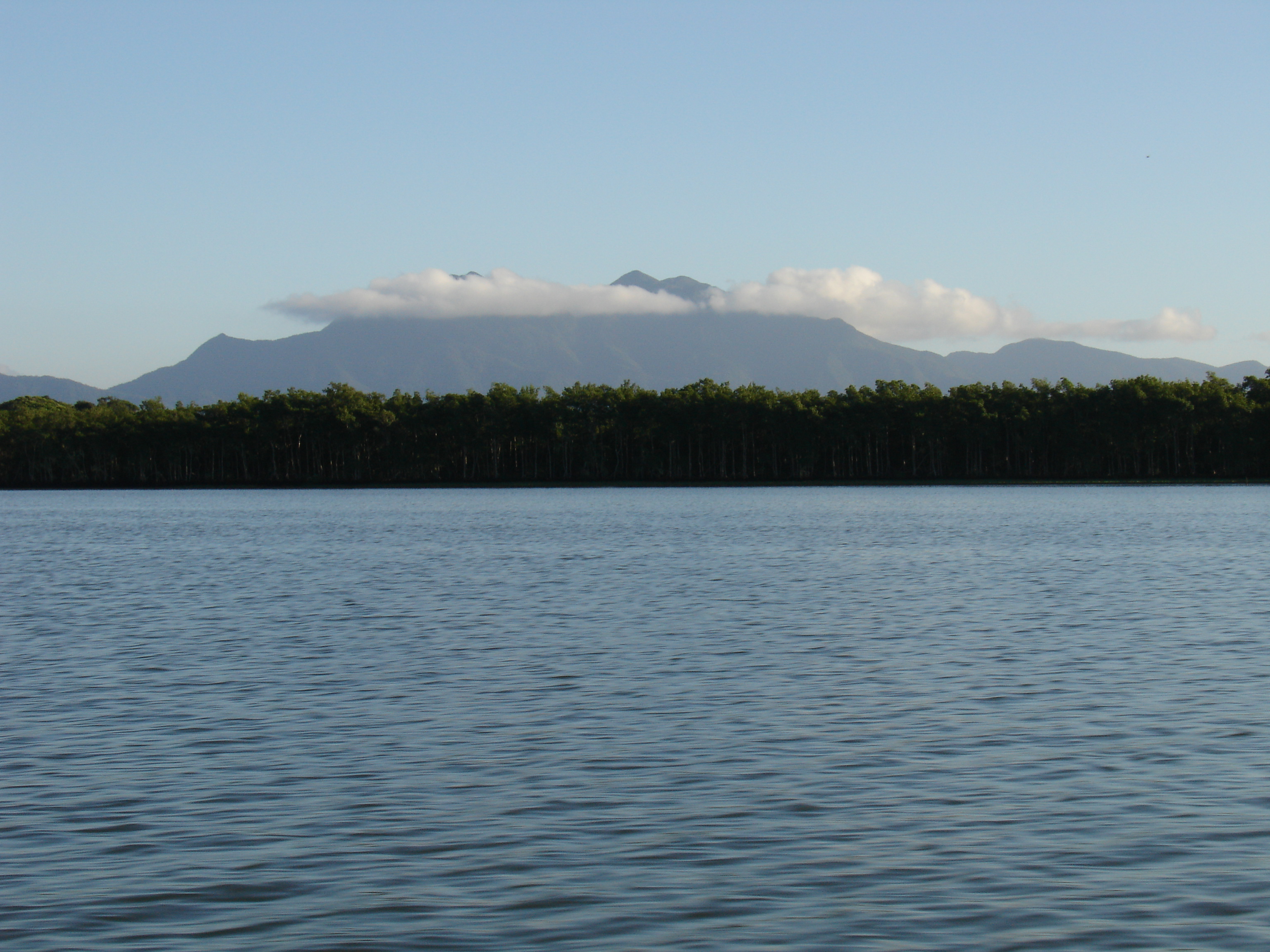
Lagamar de Cananéia State Park

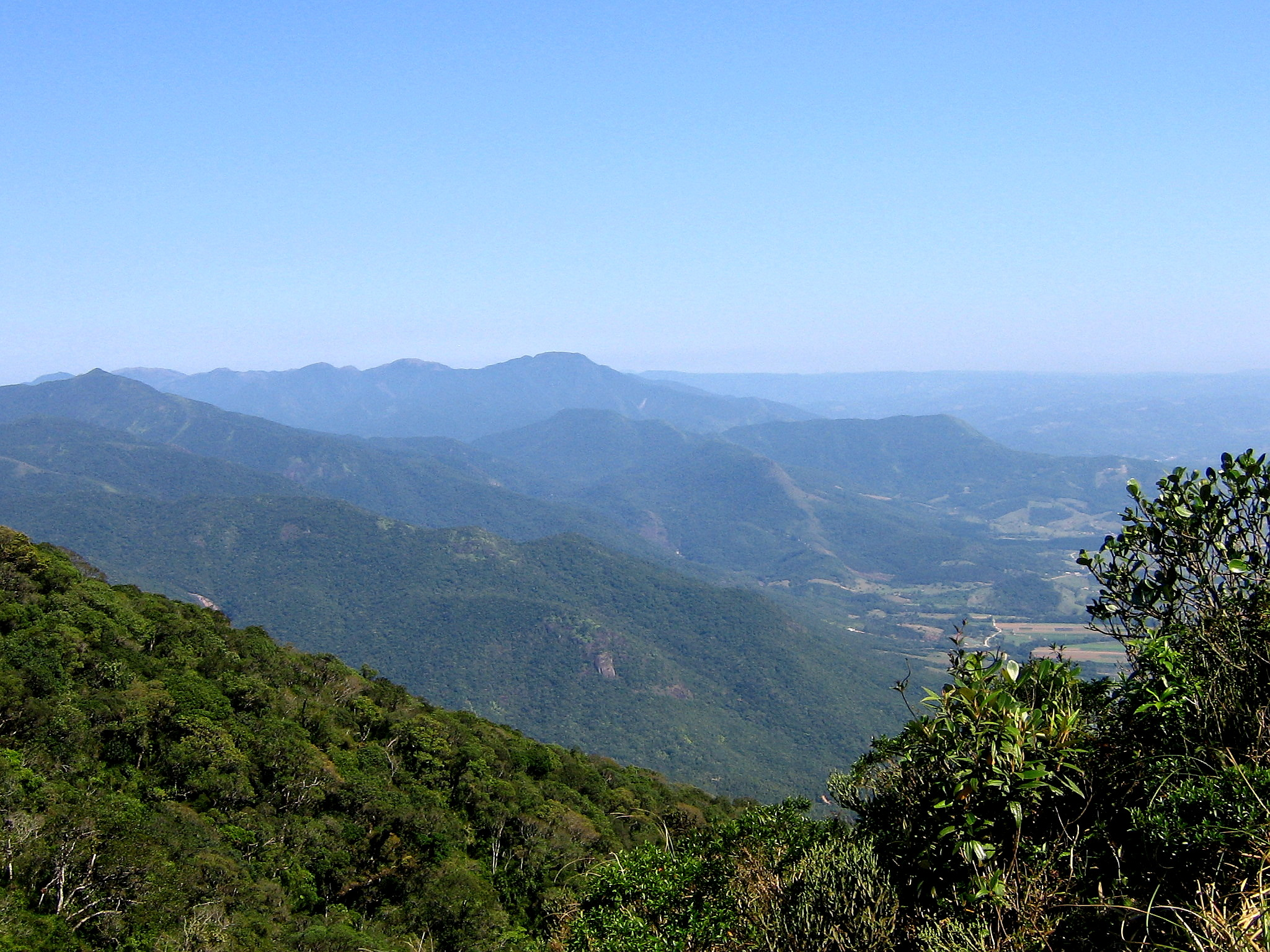
Serra do Tabuleiro State Park

| Name | State | Area (ha) | Created | Biome |
|---|---|---|---|---|
| Acaraí | Santa Catarina | 6,667 | 2005 | Atlantic Forest |
| Águas Quentes | Mato Grosso | 1,487 | 1978 | Cerrado |
| Albert Löfgren | São Paulo | 174 | 1896 | Atlantic Forest |
| Altamiro de Moura Pacheco | Goiás | 2,132 | 1992 | Cerrado |
| Alto Ribeira Tourist | São Paulo | 35,712 | 1958 | Atlantic Forest |
| Araguaia | Mato Grosso | 223,170 | 2001 | Cerrado |
| Areia Vermelha Marine | Paraíba | 156 | 2000 | Caatinga |
| Bacanga | Maranhão | 2,634 | 1980 | Amazon |
| Baleia | Minas Gerais | 102 | 1988 | Cerrado |
| Biribiri | Minas Gerais | 16,999 | 1998 | Cerrado |
| Boguaçu | Paraná | 6,052 | 1998 | Atlantic Forest |
| Cachoeira da Fumaça | Espírito Santo | 162 | 1984 | Atlantic Forest |
| Caldas Novas | Goiás | 12,315 | 1970 | Cerrado |
| Camaquã | Rio Grande do Sul | 7,993 | 1975 | Pampas, Atlantic Forest |
| Caminho dos Gerais | Minas Gerais | 56,264 | 2007 | Cerrado, Caatinga |
| Campina do Encantado | São Paulo | 3,200 | 1994 | Atlantic Forest |
| Campinhos | Paraná | 337 | 1960 | Atlantic Forest |
| Campos do Jordão | São Paulo | 8,341 | 1941 | Atlantic Forest |
| Cantão | Tocantins | 90,018 | 1998 | Amazon, Cerrado |
| Cantareira | São Paulo | 7,916 | 1962 | Atlantic Forest |
| Canudos | Bahia | 1,321 | 1986 | Caatinga |
| Caracol | Rio Grande do Sul | 25 | 1973 | Atlantic Forest |
| Carlos Botelho | São Paulo | 37,644 | 1982 | Atlantic Forest |
| Caverna do Diabo | São Paulo | 40,220 | 2008 | Atlantic Forest |
| Cerrado | Paraná | 1,830 | 1992 | Cerrado |
| Chandless | Acre | 695,303 | 2004 | Amazon |
| Charapucu | Pará | 65,181 | 2010 | Amazon |
| Corumbiara | Rondônia | 384,055 | 1990 | Amazon, Pantanal |
| Costa do Sol | Rio de Janeiro | 9,841 | 2011 | Coastal Marine |
| Cristalino | Mato Grosso | 66,900 | 2001 | Amazon, Cerrado |
| Cristalino II | Mato Grosso | 118,000 | 2001 | Amazon, Cerrado |
| Desengano | Rio de Janeiro | 21,444 | 1970 | Atlantic Forest |
| Dom Osório Stoffel | Mato Grosso | 6,422 | 2002 | Cerrado |
| Encontro das Águas | Mato Grosso | 108,960 | 2004 | Pantanal |
| Espigão Alto | Rio Grande do Sul | 1,332 | 1949 | Atlantic Forest |
| Fonte Grande | Espírito Santo | 218 | 1986 | Atlantic Forest |
| Forno Grande | Espírito Santo | 730 | 1998 | Atlantic Forest |
| Fritz Plaumann | Santa Catarina | 741 | 2003 | Atlantic Forest |
| Furnas do Bom Jesus | São Paulo | 2,069 | 1989 | Cerrado, Atlantic Forest |
| Graciosa | Paraná | 1,190 | 1990 | Atlantic Forest |
| Grão Mogol | Minas Gerais | 28,404 | 1998 | Cerrado |
| Gruta da Lagoa Azul | Mato Grosso | 12,513 | 1999 | Cerrado |
| Guajará-Mirim | Rondônia | 216,568 | 1990 | Amazon |
| Guariba | Amazonas | 72,296 | 2005 | Amazon |
| Guarita | Rio Grande do Sul | 350 | 1971 | Atlantic Forest |
| Guartelá | Paraná | 799 | 1992 | Atlantic Forest |
| Guirá | Mato Grosso | 100,000 | 2002 | Pantanal |
| Ibitipoca | Minas Gerais | 1,488 | 1973 | Atlantic Forest |
| Igarapés do Juruena | Mato Grosso | 227,817 | 2002 | Amazon |
| Ilha Anchieta | São Paulo | 828 | 1977 | Atlantic Forest |
| Ilha do Cardoso | São Paulo | 13,500 | 1962 | Atlantic Forest |
| Ilha Grande | Rio de Janeiro | 12,072 | 1971 | Atlantic Forest |
| Ilha do Mel | Paraná | 393 | 2002 | Atlantic Forest |
| Ilhabela | São Paulo | 27,025 | 1977 | Atlantic Forest |
| Intervales | São Paulo | 41,704 | 1995 | Atlantic Forest |
| Ibiporã | Paraná | 74 | 1980 | Atlantic Forest |
| Itapeva | Rio Grande do Sul | 1,000 | 2002 | Atlantic Forest |
| Itapuã | Rio Grande do Sul | 5,566 | 1973 | Coastal Marine |
| Itaúnas | Espírito Santo | 3,481 | 1991 | Atlantic Forest |
| Itinguçu | São Paulo | 5,040 | 2006 | Atlantic Forest |
| Jacupiranga | São Paulo | 150,000 | 1969 | Atlantic Forest |
| Jalapão | Tocantins | 158,885 | 2001 | Cerrado |
| Juqueri | São Paulo | 2,058 | 1993 | Cerrado |
| Jurupará | São Paulo | 26,250 | 1992 | Atlantic Forest |
| Lagamar de Cananéia | São Paulo | 40,758 | 2008 | Atlantic Forest |
| Laje de Santos Marine | São Paulo | 5,000 | 1993 | Coastal Marine |
| Lajeado | Tocantins | 9,931 | 2001 | Cerrado |
| Mãe Bonifácia | Mato Grosso | 77 | 2001 | Cerrado |
| Mananciais de Campos do Jordão | São Paulo | 503 | 1993 | Atlantic Forest |
| Massairo Okamura | Mato Grosso | 51 | 2000 | Cerrado |
| Mata das Flores | Espírito Santo | 800 | 1992 | Atlantic Forest |
| Matas do Segredo | Mato Grosso do Sul | 178 | 2000 | Cerrado |
| Matupiri | Amazonas | 513,747 | 2009 | Amazon |
| Mendanha | Rio de Janeiro | 4,398 | 2013 | Atlantic Forest |
| Mirador | Maranhão | 500,000 | 1980 | Cerrado |
| Monge | Paraná | 372 | 1960 | Atlantic Forest |
| Monte Alegre | Pará | 3,678 | 2001 | Amazon |
| Morro do Chapéu | Bahia | 46,000 | 1998 | Caatinga |
| Morro do Diabo | São Paulo | 33,845 | 1986 | Atlantic Forest |
| Nascente do Paranapanema | São Paulo | 22,269 | 2012 | Atlantic Forest |
| Nascentes do Rio Taquari | Mato Grosso do Sul | 30,619 | 1999 | Cerrado |
| Natal Dunes | Rio Grande do Norte | 1,172 | 1977 | Atlantic Forest |
| Nova Baden | Minas Gerais | 214 | 1994 | Atlantic Forest |
| Paraty-Mirim | Rio de Janeiro | | 1972 | Atlantic Forest |
| Parcel de Manuel Luís | Maranhão | 45,237 | 1991 | Coastal Marine |
| Pau Oco | Paraná | 905 | 1994 | Atlantic Forest |
| Paulo César Vinha | Espírito Santo | 1,500 | 1990 | Atlantic Forest |
| Pedra Azul | Espírito Santo | 1,240 | 1991 | Atlantic Forest |
| Pedra da Boca | Paraíba | 160 | 2000 | Caatinga |
| Pedra Branca | Rio de Janeiro | 12,394 | 1974 | Atlantic Forest |
| Pedra da Risca do Meio | Ceará | 3,300 | 1997 | Coastal Marine |
| Pedra Selada | Rio de Janeiro | 8,036 | 2012 | Atlantic Forest |
| Pico do Itambé | Minas Gerais | 4,696 | 1998 | Atlantic Forest, Cerrado |
| Pico do Jabre | Paraíba | 500 | 1992 | Atlantic Forest |
| Pico do Marumbi | Paraná | 8,745 | 1990 | Atlantic Forest |
| Pico Paraná | Paraná | 4,334 | 2002 | Atlantic Forest |
| Pirineus | Goiás | 2,833 | 1987 | Cerrado |
| Porto Ferreira | São Paulo | 611 | 1987 | Atlantic Forest |
| Prelado | São Paulo | 1,828 | 2006 | Atlantic Forest |
| Prosa | Mato Grosso do Sul | 135 | 2002 | Cerrado |
| Quarta Colônia | Rio Grande do Sul | 1,848 | 2005 | Atlantic Forest |
| Quineira | Mato Grosso | 31 | 2006 | Cerrado |
| Restinga de Bertioga | São Paulo | 9,312 | 2010 | Atlantic Forest |
| Rio Doce | Minas Gerais | 35,970 | 1944 | Atlantic Forest |
| Rio Ivinhema | Mato Grosso do Sul | 73,345 | 1998 | Atlantic Forest |
| Rio da Onça | Paraná | 1,660 | 1981 | Atlantic Forest |
| Rio Negro North Section | Amazonas | 146,028 | 1995 | Amazon |
| Rio Negro South Section | Amazonas | 86,601 | 1995 | Amazon |
| Rio do Peixe | São Paulo | 7,720 | 2002 | Atlantic Forest |
| Rio Preto | Minas Gerais | 12,184 | 1994 | Cerrado |
| Rio Turvo | São Paulo | 73,894 | 2008 | Atlantic Forest |
| Rio Vermelho | Santa Catarina | 1,532 | 2007 | Atlantic Forest |
| Roberto Ribas Lange | Paraná | 2,698 | 1994 | Atlantic Forest |
| São Camilo | Paraná | 385 | 1990 | Cerrado |
| Serra Aracá | Amazonas | 1,818,700 | 1990 | Amazon |
| Serra Azul | Mato Grosso | 11,002 | 1994 | Cerrado |
| Serra da Baitaca | Paraná | 3,053 | 2002 | Atlantic Forest |
| Serra do Cabral | Minas Gerais | 22,494 | 2005 | Cerrado |
| Serra da Concórdia | Rio de Janeiro | 5,952 | 2002 | Atlantic Forest |
| Serra do Conduru | Bahia | 9,275 | 1997 | Atlantic Forest |
| Serra Dourada | Goiás | 28,625 | 2003 | Cerrado |
| Serra Furada | Santa Catarina | 1,330 | 1980 | Atlantic Forest |
| Serra do Mar | São Paulo | 315,000 | 1977 | Atlantic Forest |
| Serra dos Martírios/Andorinhas | Pará | 24,897 | 1996 | Amazon, cerrado |
| Serra Negra | Minas Gerais | 13,654 | 1998 | Atlantic Forest |
| Serra Nova | Minas Gerais | 49,830 | 2003 | Cerrado |
| Serra do Papagaio | Minas Gerais | 22,917 | 1998 | Atlantic Forest |
| Serra Parecis | Rondônia | 38,950 | 1990 | Amazon |
| Serra dos Reis | Rondônia | 36,442 | 1995 | Amazon |
| Serra dos Reis A | Rondônia | 2,244 | 1996 | Amazon |
| Serra Ricardo Franco | Mato Grosso | 158,621 | 1997 | Cerrado, Amazon |
| Serra do Rola-Moça | Minas Gerais | 3,941 | 1994 | Cerrado, Atlantic Forest |
| Serra de Santa Bárbara | Mato Grosso | 120,092 | 1997 | Amazon |
| Serra do Tabuleiro | Santa Catarina | 84,130 | 1975 | Atlantic Forest |
| Serra da Tiririca | Rio de Janeiro | 3,493 | 1991 | Atlantic Forest |
| Sete Passagens | Bahia | 2,821 | 2000 | Atlantic Forest, Caatinga |
| Sítio Rangedor | Maranhão | 121 | 2005 | Amazon |
| Sucunduri | Amazonas | 808,312 | 2005 | Amazon |
| Sumaúma | Amazonas | 53 | 2003 | Amazon |
| Sumidouro | Minas Gerais | 2,004 | 1980 | Cerrado, Atlantic Forest |
| Tainhas | Rio Grande do Sul | 6,655 | 1975 | Atlantic Forest |
| Terra Ronca | Goiás | 57,018 | 1989 | Cerrado |
| Três Picos | Rio de Janeiro | 46,350 | 2002 | Atlantic Forest |
| Tucumã | Mato Grosso | 80,945 | 2002 | Amazon |
| Utinga | Pará | 1,393 | 1993 | Amazon |
| Vassununga | São Paulo | 2,071 | 1970 | Cerrado |
| Vila Velha | Paraná | 3,122 | 1966 | Cerrado |
| Xingu | Mato Grosso | 95,024 | 2001 | Amazon |
| Xixová-Japuí State Park | São Paulo | 901 | 1993 | Atlantic Forest |
| Zé Bolo Flô | Mato Grosso | 66 | 2000 | Cerrado |

== Sources ==
- Brazil Travel State Parks, Brazil Adventure International
- Lei No 9.985, de 18 de Julho de 2000 (in Portuguese), Presidência da República - Casa Civil- Subchefia para Assuntos Jurídicos, 18 July 2000
