= Areia Vermelha Marine State Park =

State park in Paraíba, Brazil

- Parque Estadual Marinho de Areia Vermelha
- IUCN category II (national park)
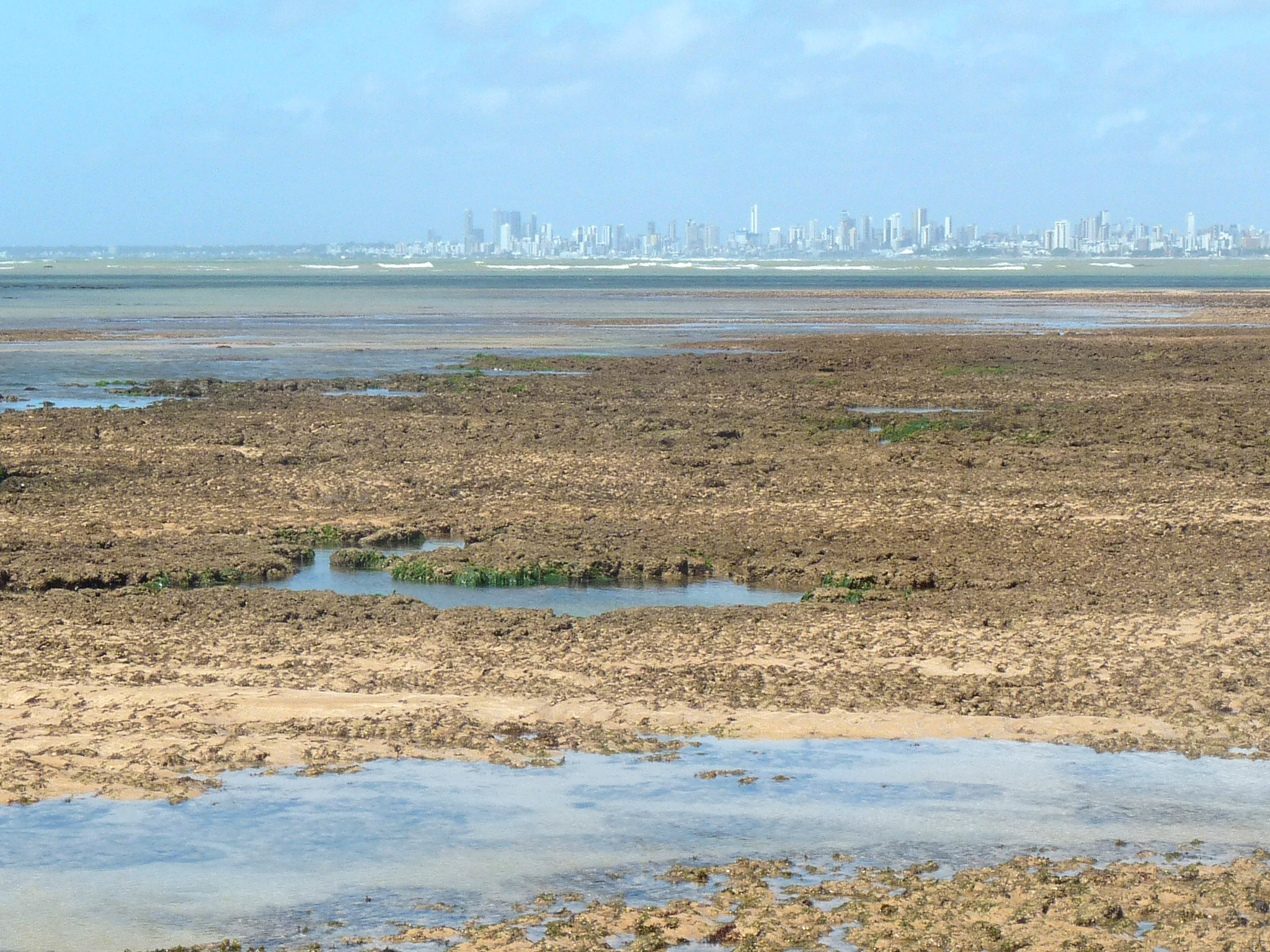
- Sandbank with João Pessoa in background

- Location within Brazil
- Nearest city: João Pessoa, Paraíba
- Coordinates: 7°00′38″S 34°49′01″W
- Area: 156 ha (390 acres)
- Designation: State park
- Created: 28 August 2000
- Administrator: Superintendência de Administração do Meio Ambiente da Paraíba

The Areia Vermelha Marine State Park (Portuguese: Parque Estadual Marinho de Areia Vermelha) is a State park in the state of Paraíba, Brazil.

== Location ==
The Areia Vermelha Marine State Park is in the municipality of Cabedelo, Paraíba. It has an area of 156 hectares (390 acres). The park is in the caatinga biome.

The Areia Vermelha is a sandbar that is uncovered only at low tide, separated from the sea by the line of reefs that protects the whole length of the Paraíba coastline. It is about 1 kilometre (0.62 mi) from the Praia de Camboinha, a beach in Cabedelo. The sandbank attracts many visitors on the weekends who walk, swim and investigate the pools. It is surrounded by corals with typical fauna.

== History ==
The Areia Vermelha Marine State Park was created by state law 21.263 of 28 August 2000. It is administered by the Environmental Management Superintendence of Paraíba (Sudema).

Studies prepared during development of the Management Plan showed serious degradation of the environment by intense and uncontrolled human activities and by practices incompatible with maintenance of the fauna and flora. On 12 November 2015 an agreement was made between the state and municipal government to better protect the park. As of January 2016 new rules were implemented that included prohibition of the sale of consumption of food and beverages in the park, and a ban on motor boats, carts, grills, tables and chairs. The food prohibition was because left-overs were attracting catfish, upsetting the delicate ecological balance of the reef.

== Sources ==
- Parque Estadual Marinho de Areia Vermelha (in Portuguese), Via Rural, archived from the original on 2017-01-07
- "Parque Marinho de Areia Vermelha, na PB, tem novas regras para visitação", G1 Globo (in Portuguese), 11 January 2016
- Sudema publica portaria sobre normatização de uso do Parque Estadual de Areia Vermelha (in Portuguese), Governo da Paraíba, 15 January 2016, archived from the original on 10 January 2017
