= Araguaia State Park =

State Park in Mato Grosso, Brazil

- Parque Estadual do Araguaia
- IUCN category II (national park)
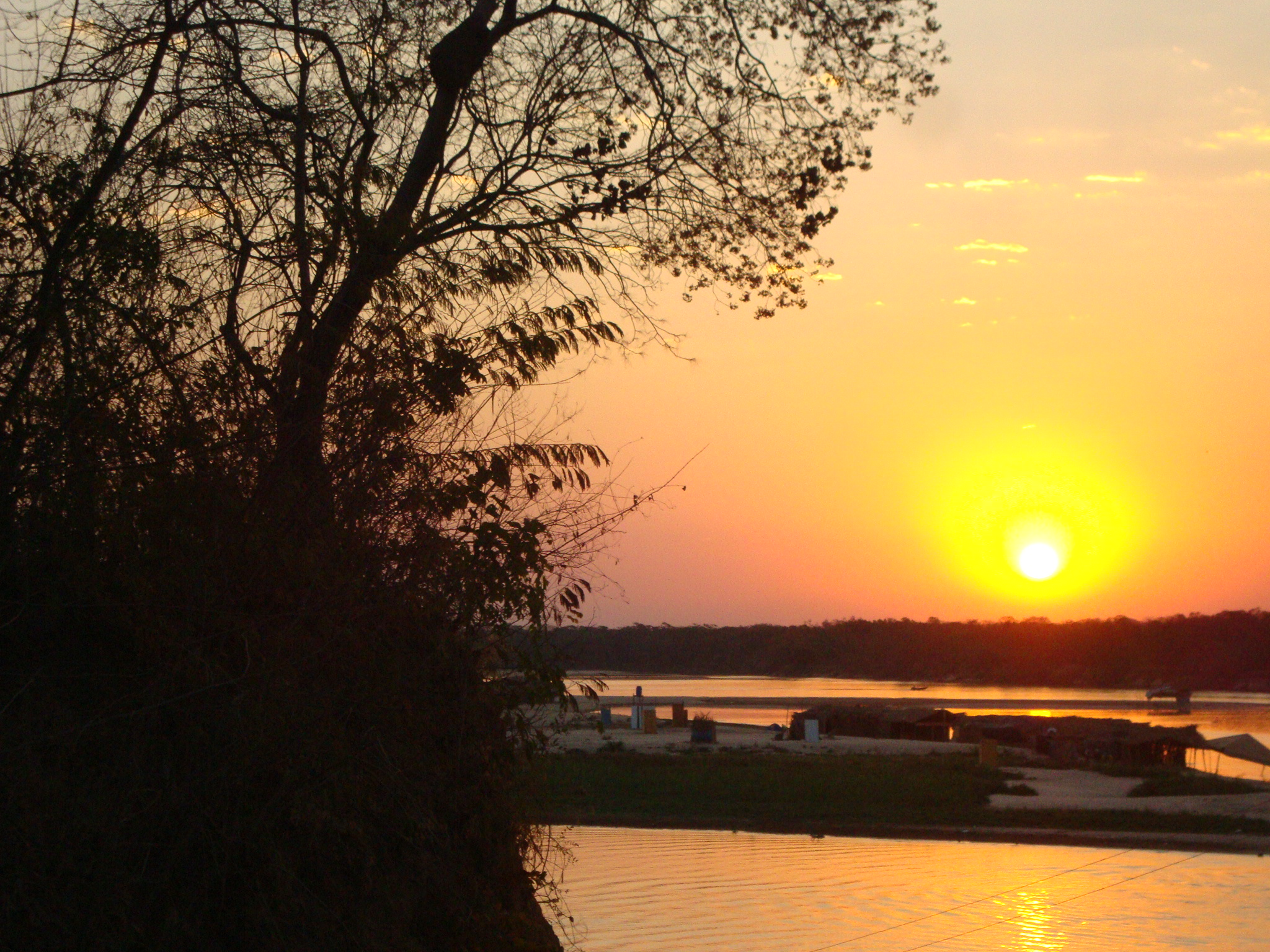
- Sunset in the park

- Location within Brazil
- Nearest city: Novo Santo Antônio, Mato Grosso
- Coordinates: 12.35°S 50.81°W
- Area: 223,170 hectares (551,500 acres)
- Designation: State park
- Created: 28 September 2001
- Administrator: Fundação Estadual do Meio Ambiente MG

The Araguaia State Park (Portuguese: Parque Estadual do Araguaia) is a state park in the state of Mato Grosso, Brazil. It protects an area of annually flooded cerrado in the transition to Amazon rainforest, and is rich in biodiversity.

== Location ==
The Araguaia State Park is in the municipality of Novo Santo Antônio, Mato Grosso. It has an area of 223,169.54 hectares (551,463.9 acres). It borders the municipalities of São Félix do Araguaia and Ribeirão Cascalheira, and the state of Tocantins. It is the southernmost part of the continuum of protected areas that extend along the right bank of the Araguaia River in Mato Grosso. It is in the Araguaia basin between the Araguaia and its tributary the Rio das Mortes.

== History ==
From the 1970s, driven by tax incentives, the state of Mato Grosso has converted huge areas of Amazon and cerrado forest into large-scale agro-pastoral systems. Most of the unoccupied land was in remote, inaccessible and protected areas. The types of protected land depend on land use. Thus 83.77% of permanently flooded land is protected, while only 3.87% of open treed savanna is protected.

The Araguaia State Park was created by law 7.517 of 28 September 2001 with an area of about 230,000 hectares (570,000 acres). The objectives were to protect water resources, allow movement of native fauna, preserve a representative sample of ecosystems in the area and support controlled public use, education and scientific research. It was to be administered by the State Environment Foundation (FEMA). The park was classed as IUCN protected area category II (national park).

At time of creation five years maximum were allowed for FEMA to prepare a management plan. The park was modified by law 8.458 of 17 January 2006. The management plan was published in 2007. It was approved in December 2008.

On 27 June 2011 the state government published a law authorizing an "exchange" with the Fundação Nacional do Índio (Funai) that would bring the Xavante people of the Maraiwatsede Indigenous Territory (TI) into the park, and regularize ownership by squatters in the TI. Funai responded that it had no interest in the exchange, which was unconstitutional since indigenous territory is inalienable. (Note: The indigenous Xavante people of the Maraiwatsede TI were evicted by the military government in the 1960s to make way for an agricultural project. The company that owned it decided to return it to the Xavantes at the time of Eco 92, but squatters occupied the land before the Indians returned. It has been devastated as it was converted to agricultural use, a process that was continuing in 2011.)

== Environment ==
The vegetation is in the transition between Amazon rainforest and the cerrado, which results in a high level of biodiversity. The park is flooded annually. Typical Amazon forest fauna include the robust capuchin monkey and howler monkey. Fauna of the cerrado include maned wolf (Chrysocyon brachyurus) and pampas deer (Ozotoceros bezoarticus). Wetland fauna include marsh deer (Blastocerus dichotomus) and capybara (Hydrochoerus hydrochaeris). The park is also home to aquatic animals such as Amazon river dolphin (Inia geoffrensis), giant otter (Pteronura brasiliensis) and turtles.

== Sources ==
- Barbosa, Luciano (29 June 2011), Troca de terra indígena proposta por MT é inconstitucional, aponta Funai (in Portuguese)
- Bosaipo, Humberto; Soares, Alencar (28 September 2001), Lei nº 7.517, de 28 de Setembro de 2001 - D.O. 02.10.01 (in Portuguese)
- Campos, João Batista (2007), Plano de Manejo Parque Estadual do Araguaia (PDF) (in Portuguese), Cuiabá: SEMA MT, archived from the original (PDF) on 2016-12-20
- Migliari, Afrânio César (11 December 2008), Portaria nº 152, de 11 de Dezembro de 2008 (PDF) (in Portuguese)
- Parque Estadual do Araguaia - Mato Grosso (in Portuguese), Via Rural, archived from the original on 2018-02-24
- Proteção Integral, SEMA MT, 28 May 2013
- Unidade de Conservação: Parque Estadual do Araguaia (in Portuguese), MMA: Ministério do Meio Ambiente
