= Matas do Segredo State Park =

State park in Mato Grosso do Sul, Brazil

- Parque Estadual Matas do Segredo
- IUCN category II (national park)
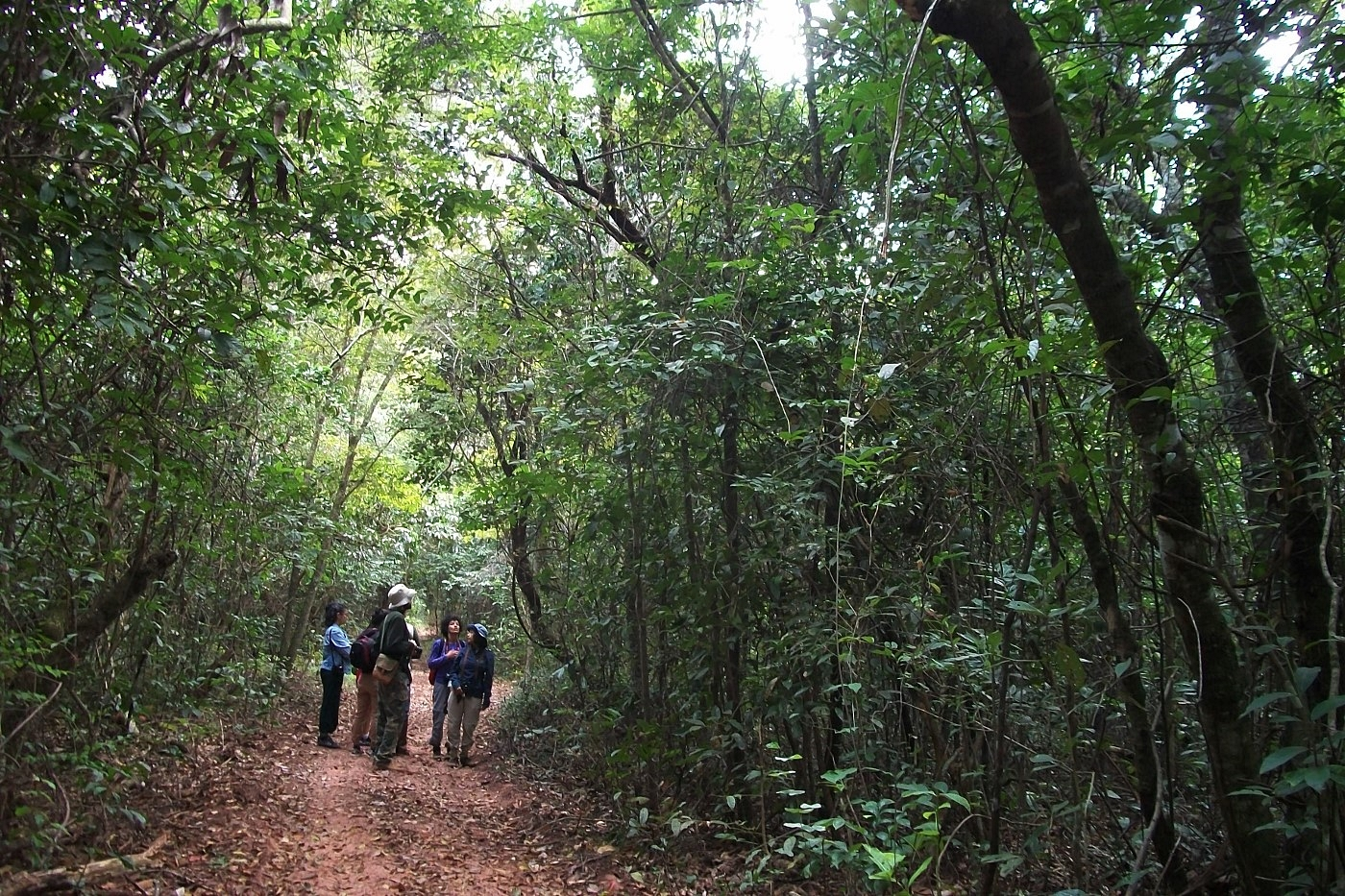
- Visitors on a trail in the park

- Location within Brazil
- Nearest city: Campo Grande, Mato Grosso do Sul
- Coordinates: 20.392385°S 54.588810°W
- Area: 177.88 hectares (439.6 acres)
- Designation: State park
- Created: 5 June 2000
- Administrator: IMASUL

The Matas do Segredo State Park (Portuguese: Parque Estadual Matas do Segredo) is an urban state park in the state of Mato Grosso do Sul, Brazil. It protects an area of cerrado forest.

== Location ==
The Matas do Segredo State Park protects a remnant of cerrado forest within the urban area of Campo Grande, Mato Grosso do Sul. It has an area of 177.88 hectares (439.6 acres). The park is the source of many springs that feed the Córrego Segredo. The park adjoins residential neighborhoods to the south and east, and pasture areas to the north and west. The urban areas both put pressure on the park and give it support as one of the few remaining green areas in the city.

== History ==
In the 1980s the area was known as the Chácara Santa Inês. Part of it was sold to a company that intended to develop it as a residential area, but this was stopped by the action of neighborhood residents associations, environmentalists and civil society organizations. who proposed expropriation to create a botanical garden for the state capital. Due to bureaucratic problems no action was taken for several years. With the development of large neighborhoods nearby the area suffered from hunting and extraction of forest products. People started fires, and trails had to be opened to give access fire department vehicles, which accelerated the degradation by hunters and gatherers.

A proposal was signed on 18 November 1990 to turn the area into a conservation unit, in part to protect the important water sources that it contains. The state governor created the Campo Grande Botanical Garden by decree 7.119/93 of 17 March 1993 to preserve the biodiversity of the cerrado and to protect the water sources. SEMA was given 180 days to start administering the area, but this did not happen.

The state government transferred the botanical garden to Matas do Segredo State Park by decree 9.935 of 5 June 2000. The objective is to protect the springs of Córrego Segredo, and the fauna and flora of the cerrado. On 17 April 2015 the State Secretary for Environment and Economic Development inaugurated the visitor center.

== Environment ==
The Köppen climate classification is Aw, with dry winters and rainy summers. Average annual rainfall is 1,500 millimetres (59 in), with least rain in the June–August period.

Random surveys of the vegetation have identified 188 species in 63 families. The greatest number of species were in the family Fabaceae (22), followed by the Rubiaceae (10), Apocynaceae, Bignoniaceae and Sapindaceae (8), and the Annonaceae and Euphorbiaceae (7). There were 10 herbaceous species, 38 shrubs, 111 trees, 24 vines and one parasite. The greatest diversity of species was found in the cerrado areas (96 species), followed by cerradão (56 species). Overall the site had good diversity of flora.

== Activities ==
The park is used for research and for environmental education for school children. The park has ecological trails, a belvedere and a visitor center. The park works with the Military Environmental Police on the Florestinha Project, where children and adolescents attend after-school classes and activities that teach them about conservation and citizenship. The program is popular with students, who help with environmental awareness programs in the neighborhood.

== Sources ==
- "Moradores já usufruem do Parque Matas do Segredo", Correio do Estado (in Portuguese), 21 April 2015
- Parque Estadual Matas do Segredo (in Portuguese), IMASUL: Instituto de Meio Ambiente de Mato Grosso do Sul, archived from the original on 2016-11-30
- Oliveira, Ademir Kleber Morbeck de; Rezende, Ubirazilda Maria (2012), "Composição florística do Parque Estadual Matas do Segredo, localizado na área urbana do município de Campo Grande, Mato Grosso do Sul" (PDF), Revsbau, 7 (3), Piracicaba – SP: Soc. Bras. de Arborização Urbana, archived from the original (PDF) on 2016-12-01
- Verbisck, Boris (16 April 2015), Parque Estadual Matas do Segredo inaugura amanhã nova estrutura para receber visitantes (in Portuguese), SEMADE
