= Mãe Bonifácia State Park =

State park in Mato Grosso, Brazil

- Parque Estadual Mãe Bonifácia
- IUCN category II (national park)
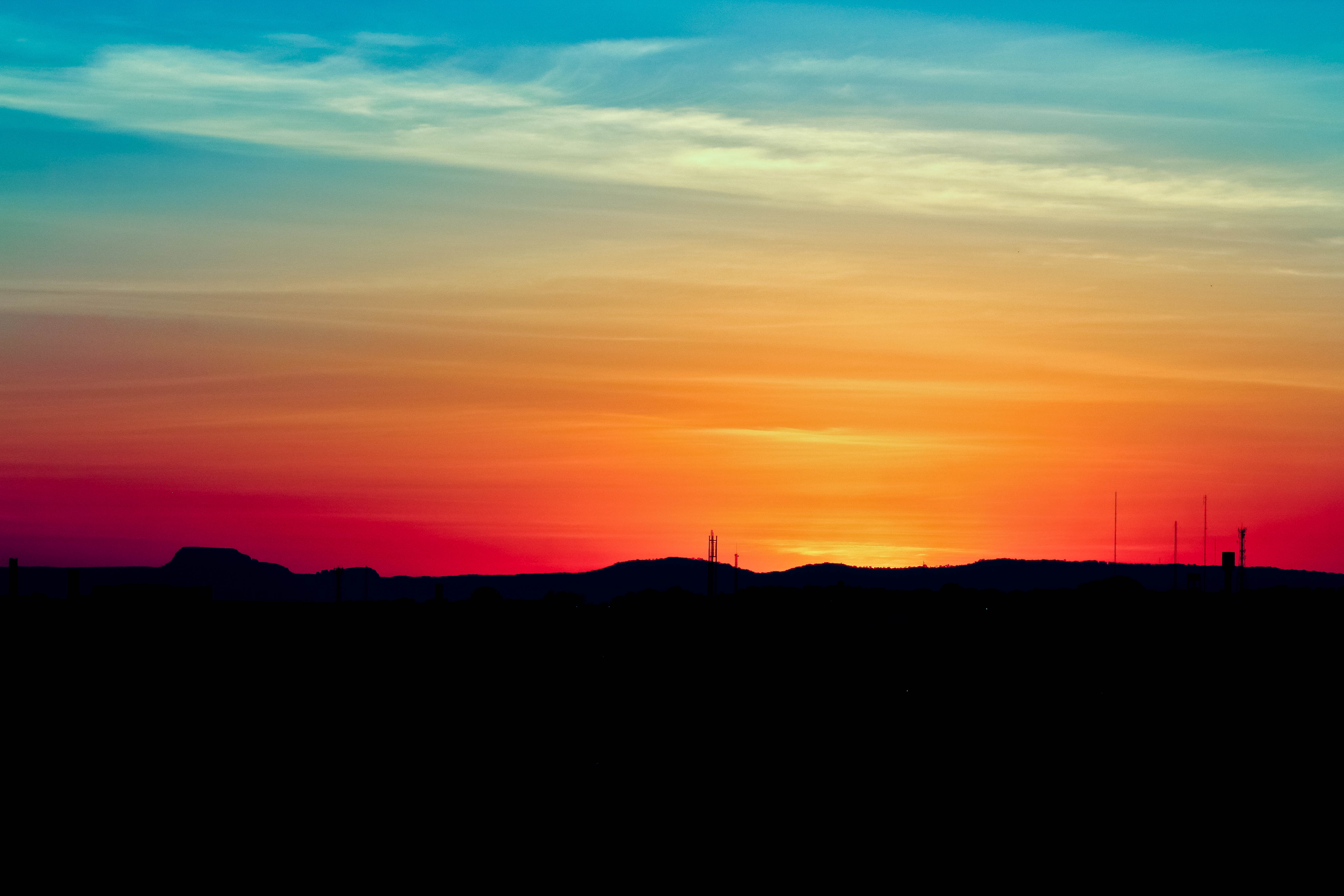
- Dawn from the lookout in the park

- Location within Brazil
- Nearest city: Cuiabá, Mato Grosso
- Coordinates: 15.579194°S 56.104986°W
- Area: 77.16 hectares (190.7 acres)
- Designation: State park
- Created: 2000
- Administrator: Secretaria de Estado de Meio Ambiente

The Mãe Bonifácia State Park (Portuguese: Parque Estadual Mãe Bonifácia) is a state park in the city of Cuiabá, Mato Grosso, Brazil. It is a city park with nature trails, jogging trails, a playground and picnic areas. The park is heavily used, and has some environmental problems.

== Location ==
The Mãe Bonifácia State Park is in the Duque de Caxias neighborhood of Cuiabá, the state capital of Mato Grosso. It has an area of 77.16 hectares (190.7 acres). The trees are mostly typical of the cerrado. There are some white-headed marmosets (Callithrix geoffroyi) and other small primates in the park.

The park is a popular place for residents of Cuiabá or tourists to relax with their children. There are paved and sand trails for exercise, with physical exercise equipment, a playground, a lookout that gives a 360° view of the city, and wildlife and flora trails. The longest trail is the Trilha das Bandeiras, at 3,480 metres (11,420 ft). The park can be visited free of charge from 5:30 am to 6:00 pm daily. It gets about 600 visitors per day, rising to 3,000 on weekends.

== History ==
The park contains a statue of Mãe Bonifácia, after whom it is named. She is said to have been a black healer who lived in Cuiabá near the park at the turn of the 19th century, and helped escape slaves to avoid the men hired to recapture them. At that time the park area was dense forest, and contained a quilombo, a settlement of former slaves. There are few if any written records of Mãe Bonifácia's life, so almost all that is known comes from oral tradition. Some historians question whether she existed.

The Mãe Bonifácia Park was created by decree 1.470 of 2000. It was inaugurated in December 2000 by state governor Dante Martins de Oliveira. It is administered by the Secretary of State for the Environment (SEMA). It was re-categorized as a state park by decree 722 of 2011. As a result it should be fully protected, with a natural area largely unchanged by human action, used for scientific, cultural, scenic, educational and recreational purposes, with only indirect use of its resources. A management plan was published in 2013, with an executive summary dated 22 November 2013, which makes recommendations for land use and ways to reduce environmental damage.

== Issues ==
As of 2011 the region around the park did not have a sewage collection system, apart from a few condominiums that have their own arrangements. Sewage is washed into the nearest streams including the Córrego Mãe Bonifácia, which runs through the park and causes an unpleasant odor. Other problems include trash, environmental damage due to the large numbers of visitors, destruction of the riparian forest and the presence of exotic species. Since the park is isolated, some native species may not be viable.

== Sources ==
- Holland, Carolina (20 November 2013), "Mulher que acolheu escravos dá nome a parque urbano de Cuiabá", G1 Globo (in Portuguese)
- Ormond, Talita (25 January 2015), "Plano de manejo aponta deficiências no Mãe Bonifácia - Confira as fotos", RD News (in Portuguese)
- Torres, Duda; Barbant, Maria (4 March 2011), Estado investe na estrutura do Parque Mãe Bonifácia em Cuiabá (in Portuguese), SEFAZ: Secretaria de Estado de Fazenda MT
- Von Eye, Gabriela (7 January 2013), Parque Mãe Bonifácia: uma pequena floresta dentro de Cuiabá (in Portuguese), Conhecendo MT
