= Novo Santo Antônio =

- Municipality
- Location in Piauí state

- Location in Brazil
- Coordinates: 5°17′18″S 41°56′0″W
- Country: Brazil
- Region: Northeast
- State: Piauí

Area
  - Total: 481.71 km^{2} (185.99 sq mi)

Population (2020)
  - Total: 3,003
  - Density: 6.234/km^{2} (16.15/sq mi)
- Time zone: UTC−3 (BRT)

Novo Santo Antônio (Portuguese for "New Saint Anthony") is a Brazilian municipality of the state of Piauí. The population is 3,003 (2020 est.) in an area of 481.71 km^{2}.

The municipality contains the 223,170-hectare (551,500-acre) Araguaia State Park, created in 2001.
