= Espigão Alto State Park =

State park in Rio Grande do Sul, Brazil

- Parque Estadual do Espigão Alto
- IUCN category II (national park)
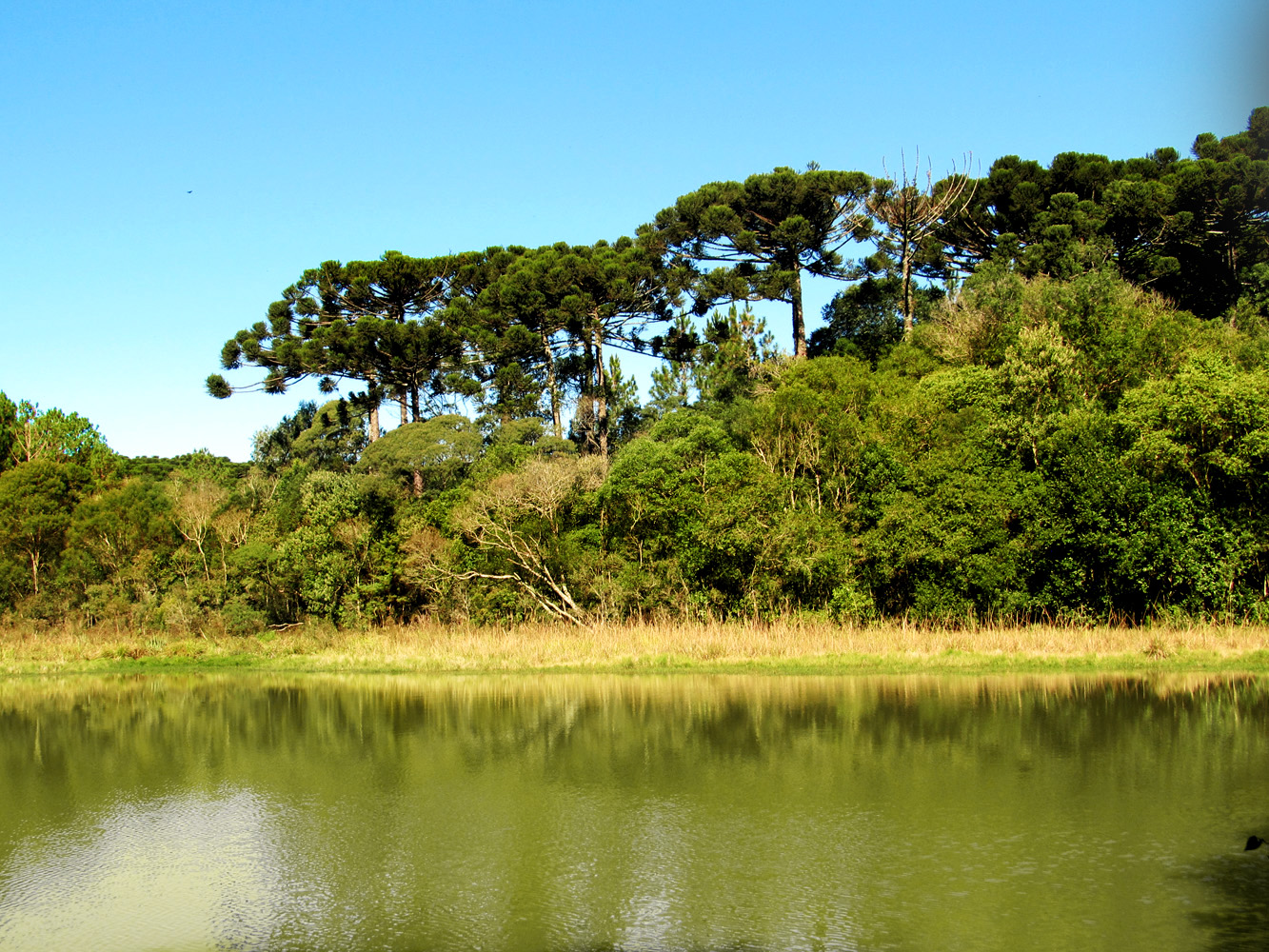

- Location within Brazil
- Nearest city: Barracão, Rio Grande do Sul
- Coordinates: 27°37′10″S 51°30′47″W
- Area: 1,332 ha (5.14 sq mi)
- Designation: State park
- Created: 10 March 1949

The Espigão Alto State Forest Park (Portuguese: Parque Florestal Estadual Espigão Alto) is a state park in the state of Rio Grande do Sul, Brazil. It protects an area of old forest of which araucarias are the most prominent species.

== Location ==
The Espigão Alto State Park is in the Espigão district of the municipality of Barracão, Rio Grande do Sul. It has an area of 1,332 hectares (3,290 acres). The park is in the Araucarias Plateau, in the region of Campos de Cima da Serra, in the northeast of the state. It is 400 kilometres (250 mi) from Porto Alegre, the state capital. The park is in the Brazilian Highlands, near the Uruguay River in the valley of the Marmeleiro stream.

== History ==
The Espigão Alto Forest Reserve was created by state decree 658 of 10 March 1949. It was transformed into a state park by law 2.440 of 2 October 1954. Law 8.893 of 2 August 1989 allowed for the cultivation of exotic forest species that already existed in this and other state forest parks. The park was registered as being part of the state's natural and cultural heritage on 23 July 1994. Decree 42.000 of 9 December 2002 declared the land covered by the park as being of public utility for the purpose of expropriation as a step towards regularizing land ownership in the park. As of 2013 the park was open only to researchers and to students receiving environmental education.

== Environment ==
The park preserves a large remnant of Araucaria forest (mixed rainforest) and smaller remnants of the Upper Uruguay Forest (seasonal deciduous forest). Flora includes araucaria forest, as well as species such as cedar, camboatá, laurel, cinnamon, bracatinga, angico, guajuvira, cabreúva, grápia, timbaúva and timbó. Some of the plants in the park are centuries old. The shade-growing xaxin (Dicksonia sellowiana), which is threatened with extinction, can take up to 100 years to reach a height of 1 metre (3 ft 3 in). The most conspicuous trees are the araucarias, which once covered 25% of the state but have been reduced to 1%. One of the araucarias is over 40 metres (130 ft) tall and is estimated from the width of its trunk to be more than 300 years old.

The forest is a refuge for wild animals such as pacas, robust capuchin monkeys, pygmy brocket (Mazama nana) and ocelot (Leopardus pardalis), as well as species of birds such as the vinaceous-breasted amazon (Amazona vinacea), red-spectacled amazon (Amazona pretrei), scarlet ibis (Eudocimus ruber) and azure jay (Cyanocorax caeruleus).

== Sources ==
- "Barracão abriga uma das unidades de conservação mais antigas do RS", G1 Globo (in Portuguese), 27 September 2013
- Parque Estadual do Espigão Alto (in Portuguese), Via Rural, archived from the original on February 14, 2009
- Parque Florestal Espigão Alto (in Portuguese), IPHAE: Instituto do Patrimônio Histórico e Artístico do Estado
- Parque Florestal Espigão Alto (in Portuguese), SEDAC: Secretaria de Estado da Cultura
- PES de Espigão Alto (in Portuguese), ISA: Instituto Socioambiental
