= Zé Bolo Flô State Park =

State park in Mato Grosso, Brazil

- Parque Estadual Zé Bolo Flô
- IUCN category II (national park)
- Location within Brazil
- Nearest city: Cuiabá, Mato Grosso
- Coordinates: 15.631939°S 56.058388°W
- Area: 66 hectares (160 acres)
- Designation: State park
- Created: 23 August 2000

The Zé Bolo Flô State Park (Portuguese: Parque Estadual Zé Bolo Flô), formerly the José Inácio da Silva State Park is a State park in the city of Cuiabá, capital of the state of Mato Grosso, Brazil.

== Location ==
The José Inácio da Silva State Park is in the municipality of Cuiabá, Mato Grosso. It has an area of 66 hectares (160 acres). The park is named after a wandering poet and songwriter, born José Inácio da Silva. He sold cakes and flowers in Alencastro Square in the center of Cuiabá, and was given the nickname Zé Bolo Flô from his hawker's cry.

The park provides a place to relax for residents of Grande Coxipó and the clientele of the health establishments in the park, the Adauto Botelho Hospital, the Doutor Agrícola Paes de Barros School of Public Health and the Ophiology Center. The vegetation is cerrado forest, and there are many species of fruit trees. There are two hiking trails, and shortcut paths used by the population. The park has fixed grills and tables, gymnasiums, a mini-stadium and soccer field, playgrounds, landscaping, native forest, ponds, snack bars, toilets, pedestrian path and bike path, and a walkway linking in to the botanical gardens.

== History ==
The state park was created as the Health Park of the State of Mato Grosso (Portuguese: Parque da Saúde do Estado de Mato Grosso) by decree-law 1.693 of 23 August 2000, with an approximate area of 66.3985 hectares (164.074 acres). Decree 4138 of 4 April 2002 changed the name to the José Inácio da Silva – "Zé Bolo Flô" State Park. On 26 September 2011 it was renamed to the Zé Bolo Flô State Park. The management plan was issued for approval of 17 October 2012. The consultative council was created of 18 December 2014.

== Sources ==
- Marimon, Marianna (14 February 2014), "O poeta-andarilho e mendigo, que fazia músicas e poemas para Cuiabá, virou nome de parque: Zé Bolo Flô", Olharconceito (in Portuguese)
- Parque Municipal da Saude - Parque Zé Bolo Flor (in Portuguese), Cuiabá Municipality, archived from the original on 2016-12-21
- PES da José Inácio da Silva (Zé Bolo Flô) (in Portuguese), ISA: Instituto Socioambiental
