= Ibiporã =

Coordinates: 23°17′S 51°03′W

- Municipality
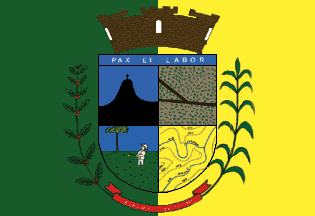
- Flag
- Motto(s): PAX ET LABOR (translated from Latin, it means: "Peace and Labour")
- Country: Brazil
- Region: Southern
- State: Paraná
- Mesoregion: Norte Central Paranaense

Population (2022 (Census))
  - Total: 51,603
  - Estimate (2025): 53,276
- Time zone: UTC−3 (BRT)

Ibiporã is a municipality in the state of Paraná in the Southern Region of Brazil.

The municipality contains the 74-hectare (180-acre) Ibiporã State Park, created in 1980.

== Toponymy ==
"Ibiporã" comes from the Tupi language and means "pretty land", from yby ("land") and porang ("pretty").

== Climate ==
Climate data for Ibiporã, elevation 484 m (1,588 ft), (1973–2014)
Month	Jan	Feb	Mar	Apr	May	Jun	Jul	Aug	Sep	Oct	Nov	Dec	Year
Record high °C (°F)	37.3 (99.1)	38.3 (100.9)	37.4 (99.3)	34.8 (94.6)	33.0 (91.4)	30.5 (86.9)	31.8 (89.2)	35.3 (95.5)	37.9 (100.2)	39.2 (102.6)	40.2 (104.4)	37.2 (99.0)	40.2 (104.4)
Mean daily maximum °C (°F)	29.9 (85.8)	30.3 (86.5)	30.2 (86.4)	28.6 (83.5)	25.1 (77.2)	23.8 (74.8)	24.2 (75.6)	26.6 (79.9)	27.3 (81.1)	29.1 (84.4)	29.8 (85.6)	29.9 (85.8)	27.9 (82.2)
Daily mean °C (°F)	24.5 (76.1)	24.6 (76.3)	24.2 (75.6)	22.5 (72.5)	19.3 (66.7)	17.8 (64.0)	17.9 (64.2)	19.8 (67.6)	21.0 (69.8)	22.9 (73.2)	23.9 (75.0)	24.4 (75.9)	21.9 (71.4)
Mean daily minimum °C (°F)	20.4 (68.7)	20.5 (68.9)	19.9 (67.8)	18.0 (64.4)	14.9 (58.8)	13.4 (56.1)	13.0 (55.4)	14.3 (57.7)	15.7 (60.3)	17.7 (63.9)	18.7 (65.7)	19.9 (67.8)	17.2 (63.0)
Record low °C (°F)	13.5 (56.3)	14.5 (58.1)	10.0 (50.0)	5.3 (41.5)	2.2 (36.0)	−0.9 (30.4)	−1.9 (28.6)	0.8 (33.4)	4.9 (40.8)	9.0 (48.2)	11.8 (53.2)	11.0 (51.8)	−1.9 (28.6)
Average precipitation mm (inches)	218.0 (8.58)	174.9 (6.89)	136.5 (5.37)	104.2 (4.10)	107.5 (4.23)	92.0 (3.62)	62.5 (2.46)	45.7 (1.80)	105.9 (4.17)	134.2 (5.28)	151.7 (5.97)	189.5 (7.46)	1,522.6 (59.93)
Average precipitation days (≥ 1.0 mm)	15	13	12	8	8	7	6	5	9	10	11	13	117
Average relative humidity (%)	76	75	72	70	72	74	68	60	63	64	65	71	69
Mean monthly sunshine hours	200.7	195.2	220.4	226.1	217.3	204.7	228.2	241.2	202.3	219.6	226.1	209.5	2,591.3
Source: IDR-Paraná

== See also ==
- List of municipalities in Paraná
