= Laje de Santos Marine State Park =

State park in São Paulo, Brazil

- Parque Estadual Marinho da Laje de Santos
- IUCN category II (national park)
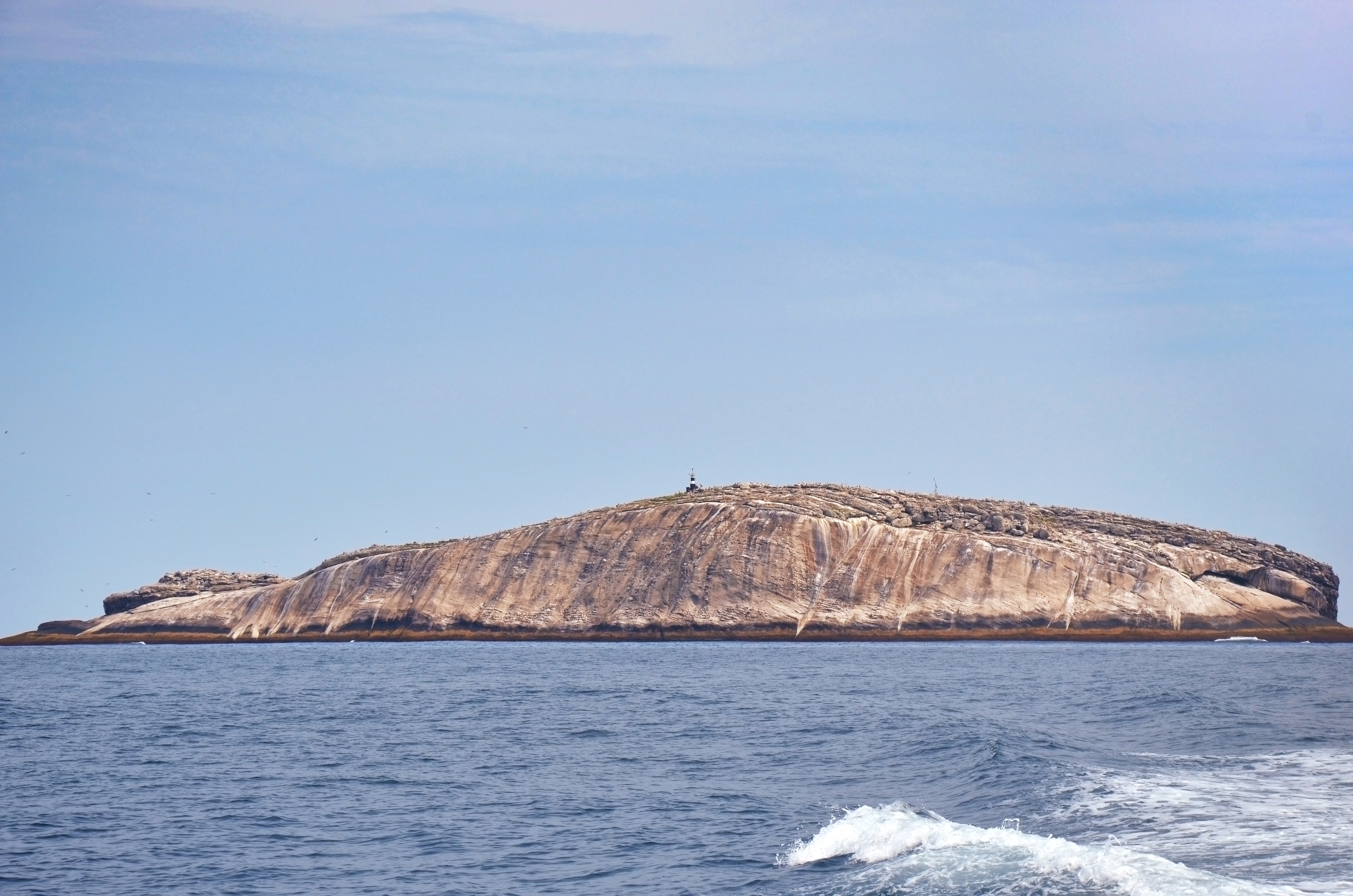
- Laje de Santos

- Location within Brazil
- Nearest city: Santos, São Paulo
- Coordinates: 24°19′11″S 46°10′54″W
- Area: 5,000 ha (19 sq mi)
- Designation: State park
- Created: 27 September 1993
- Administrator: Instituto Estadual Florestal

The Laje de Santos Marine State Park (Portuguese: Parque Estadual Marinho da Laje de Santos) is a state park in the state of São Paulo, Brazil. It protects a marine area off the coast of the state, and was the first such park to be created by São Paulo. It includes a rocky islet, tidal reefs and surrounding waters, with various areas suitable for diving, including a boat that was deliberately wrecked to form an artificial reef. The combination of warm surface waters and cold deeper waters supports a high level of biodiversity.

== Location ==
The Laje de Santos Marine State Park is in the municipality of Santos, São Paulo. The park covers a 5,000-hectare (12,000-acre) marine rectangle that contains the Laje de Santos island and the Bandolim, Brilhante and Sul e Novo rocks and reefs. It is 16.8 nautical miles from the Moela Island Lighthouse on the mainland. The Laje de Santos is an island formed by the top of a mostly submerged granite mountain 22 nautical miles from the coast. The island is 550 by 185 metres (1,804 by 607 ft), and is 33 metres (108 ft) high. The greatest depth in the surrounding sea is 42 metres (138 ft).

== History ==
The Laje de Santos Marine State Park was created by state governor Luís Antônio Fleury Filho by decree 37.537 of 27 September 1993. It aims to fully protect the flora, fauna, scenic beauty and natural, marine and terrestrial ecosystems. It is the first marine park created by the state. At first nothing was done to impose the total ban on fishing within the park, which existed only on paper. After 2003 a change in government policy has improved protection, as has an active NGO that is dedicated to protection of the park. Volunteers and paid staff now have boats and equipment to patrol the boundaries. The park administration is under the Forest Foundation, a unit of the Environment Secretariat of the State of São Paulo.

== Environment ==
The park contains the uninhabited Laje de Santos islet and several rocky reefs separated by extensive areas of sand, with a maximum depth of about 45 metres (148 ft). It is in the transition between tropical and sub-tropical environments, and is a high latitude "marginal" reef site. The granite rocks below the low tide level are mostly covered in patches of brown and red algae, Palythoa caribaeorum, hydrozoa, ascidiacea and octocorallia. The bedrock also holds sparse, isolated colonies of the Madracis decactis and Mussismilia hispida scleractinia.

The prevailing Brazil Current brings warm surface waters from the north, supporting a local reef fish population that is closer to the fauna of the tropical Western Atlantic and Northeastern Brazilian coast than the fauna of southern temperate reefs. A seasonal upwelling brings colder waters of 14 to 18 °C (57 to 64 °F) up from the shelf slope to the deepest areas of the reef, where temperate species are found. The result is a fauna that ranges from that of tropical regions to subtropical endemics and species found as far south as Patagonia.

196 reef fish species have been recorded, in 124 genera and 66 families. The families with the most species were Carangidae (16), Grouper (12), Wrasse (10), Pomacentridae (8) and Parrotfish (8). Abundant fish species include the tomtate grunt (Haemulon aurolineatum), sergeant major (Abudefduf saxatilis), brown chromis (Chromis multilineata), dusky damselfish (Stegastes fuscus), jubauna reeffish (Chromis jubauna), silver porgy (Diplodus argenteus), porkfish (Anisotremus virginicus) and ringneck blenny (Parablennius pilicornis). The park is on the migratory route of the giant manta rays of the Brazilian coast, which visit in the autumn and winter.

== Visiting ==
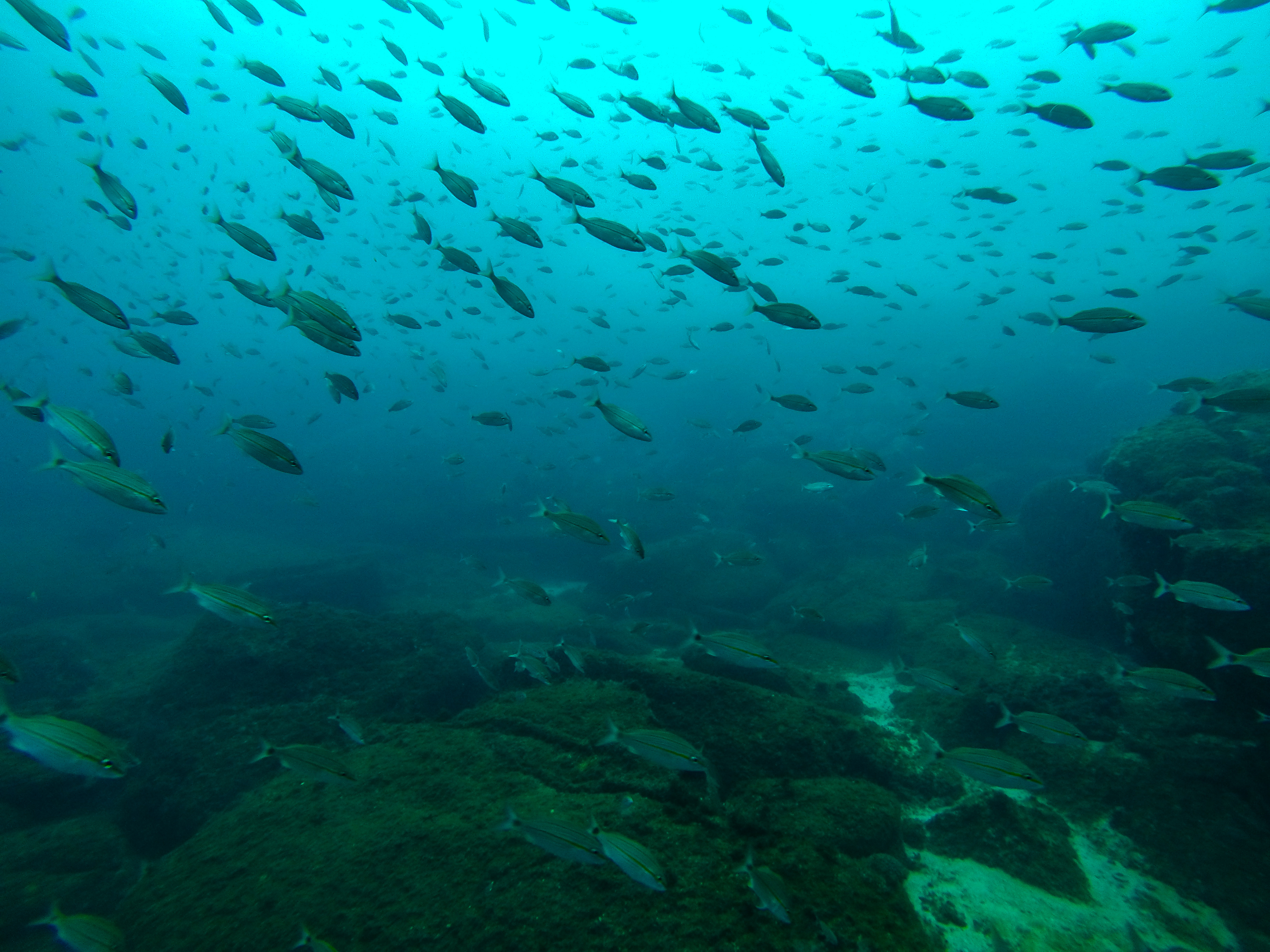
School of yellowstripe grunt (Haemulon chrysargyreum)

Public use is allowed under park rules that ensure conservation and appreciation of the local ecosystems. Scuba diving and boating are allowed in the park. Boats are no longer allowed to anchor, but diving boats may use mooring buoys. Visitors may not capture or collect any marine or terrestrial organism, except where permitted for scientific research, must not land on the island or reefs without prior authorization, and must refrain from any activities that cause physical damage or pollution.

Diving areas include Portinho on the sheltered north coast of the Laje, a smooth rocky slope that presents little difficulty to the diver. It is inhabited by many benthic fish and invertebrates, and sea turtles are often present. The Boca da Baleia (Whale's Mouth) is a rock formation on the south side of the Laje de Santos where many fish and turtles are found, with a depth of up to 18 metres (59 ft). The Ponta Leste (East Point) of the Laje de Santos descends to 29 metres (95 ft). Halfway down it is common to see southern stingray, large groupers, Atlantic wreckfish and even Atlantic goliath groupers. Nearer the surface there are always many turtles and assorted shoals of fish. The Naufrágio do Moréia (Moray Wreck) is a deliberately wrecked iron fishing boat that was sunk in 1995 to create an artificial reef. The boat is disintegrating, so should not be entered. It is home to invertebrates such as sea anemones and gorgonians, crustaceans, groupers, sargos, white grunt (Haemulon plumierii) and salema porgies.

== Sources ==
- Fleury, Luiz Antônio, Filho (27 September 1993), Decreto nº 37.537, de 27 de Setembro de 1993 27/09/1993 (in Portuguese)
- Luiz, Osmar J. Jr.; Carvalho-Filho, Alfredo; Ferreira, Carlos E. L.; Floeter, Sergio R.; Gasparini, João Luiz; Sazima, Ivan (2008), "The reef fish assemblage of the Laje de Santos Marine State Park, Southwestern Atlantic: annotated checklist with comments on abundance, distribution, trophic structure, symbiotic associations, and conservation" (PDF), Zootaxa, 1807: 1–25, ISSN 1175-5334
- O Parque Estadual Marinho da Laje de Santos (in Portuguese), Instituto Laje Viva
- Pontos de Mergulho (in Portuguese), Instituto Laje Viva
