= Rio Vermelho State Park =

State park in Santa Catarina, Brazil

- Parque Estadual do Rio Vermelho
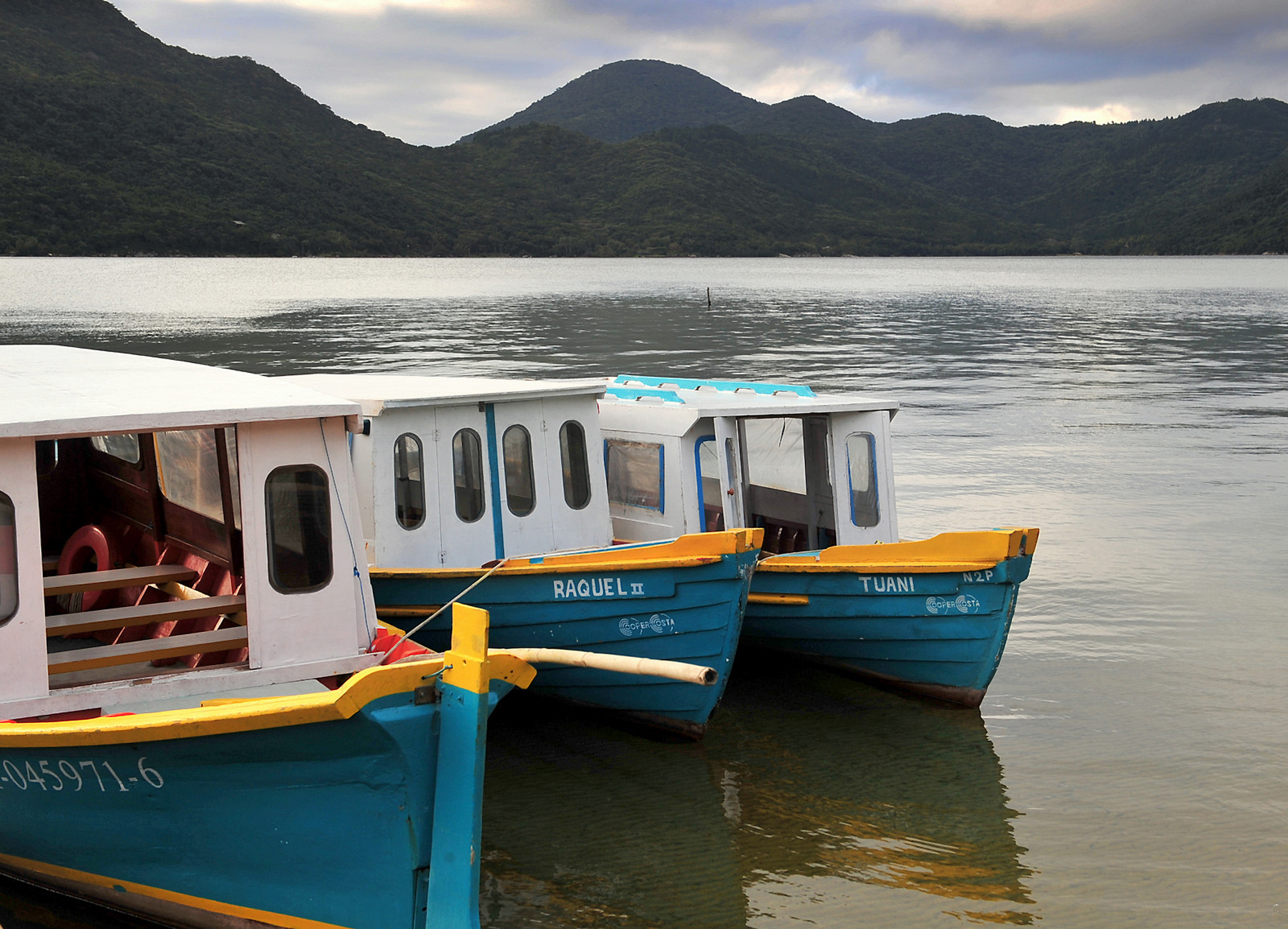
- Boat terminal on the Lagoa da Conceição for tourist transport to the Costa da Lagoa

- Location within Brazil
- Nearest city: Florianópolis, Santa Catarina
- Coordinates: 27°32′48″S 48°26′06″W
- Area: 1,532 ha (5.92 sq mi)
- Designation: State park
- Created: 24 May 2007
- Administrator: Fundação do Meio Ambiente

The Rio Vermelho State Park Portuguese: Parque Estadual do Rio Vermelho is a state park in the state of Santa Catarina, Brazil. It protects an area of restinga, dense rainforest and land modified by exotic plantations which is to be restored. The park provides a green space for visitors from the nearby state capital of Florianópolis. It features an ecological trail where visitors may see and learn about wild animals rescued from abuse by the environmental police.

== Location ==
The Rio Vermelho State Park is located on the east coast of Santa Catarina Island, in the municipality of Florianópolis, Santa Catarina. It is bounded by the district of São João do Rio Vermelho to the north, Lagoa da Conceição to the west, Moçambique beach to the east and the district of Barra da Lagoa to the south. It has an area of 1,532 hectares (3,790 acres). Highway SC-406 cuts through the park.

The park holds one of the oldest sambaquis of the island, about 5,020 years old. The park holds the Ingleses-Rio Vermelho aquifer, which supplies water to the north of Santa Catarina Island, and ensures that the water of the aquifer is plentiful and uncontaminated. A large part of the 12.5 kilometres (7.8 mi) Moçambique beach is inside the park, the largest beach in Florianópolis.

== History ==
The area now covered by the park was made a Forest Station in 1962 with the goal of finding through experiment the species best able to grow and protect the dunes of the sea coast, and also to provide a green space for the population. Species of pine such as Pinus elliottii and eucalyptus from different parts of the world were planted over a twelve-year period, as well as casuarina, acacias and other exotic species. It is now known that these are all more or less invasive, particularly the pines, and studies are being made on how best to remove all the exotic species and restore the park. The pine and eucalyptus wood will be sold.

The Rio Vermelho State Park was created by state decree 308 of 24 May 2007. The objective is to conserve samples of dense rainforest and restinga vegetation, to conserve the associated fauna, to maintain balance in the region's water complex, to restore the ecosystem and to support scientific research and public visits.

== Environment ==
The park contains 11% dense rainforest of the Atlantic Forest biome (in the Morro dos Macacos), 54% restinga with different heights and species, and 35% ecosystems altered by plantation and invasions of pine and eucalyptus trees. 169 native plant species have been identified, associated with three types of restinga: herbaceous (66 species), shrub (14 species) and arboreal (100 species). The thorny climbing shrub Mimosa catharinensis Burkart was discovered in the area in 1964. It has not been found anywhere else in the world.

There are 23 species of mammals on the island, almost all of which may be present in the park. Researchers from the Federal University of Santa Catarina have found the footprints of big-eared opossum (Didelphis aurita) and crab-eating fox (Cerdocyon thous). The black capuchin (Sapajus nigritus) is found in the park and gives its name to the Morro dos Macacos (Monkey Hill). 106 species of birds and 15 species of reptiles have been recorded. The skull tree iguana (Liolaemus occipitalis) is a rare, endangered species that lives only in the coastal dunes of Santa Catarina and Rio Grande do Sul.

== Visiting ==
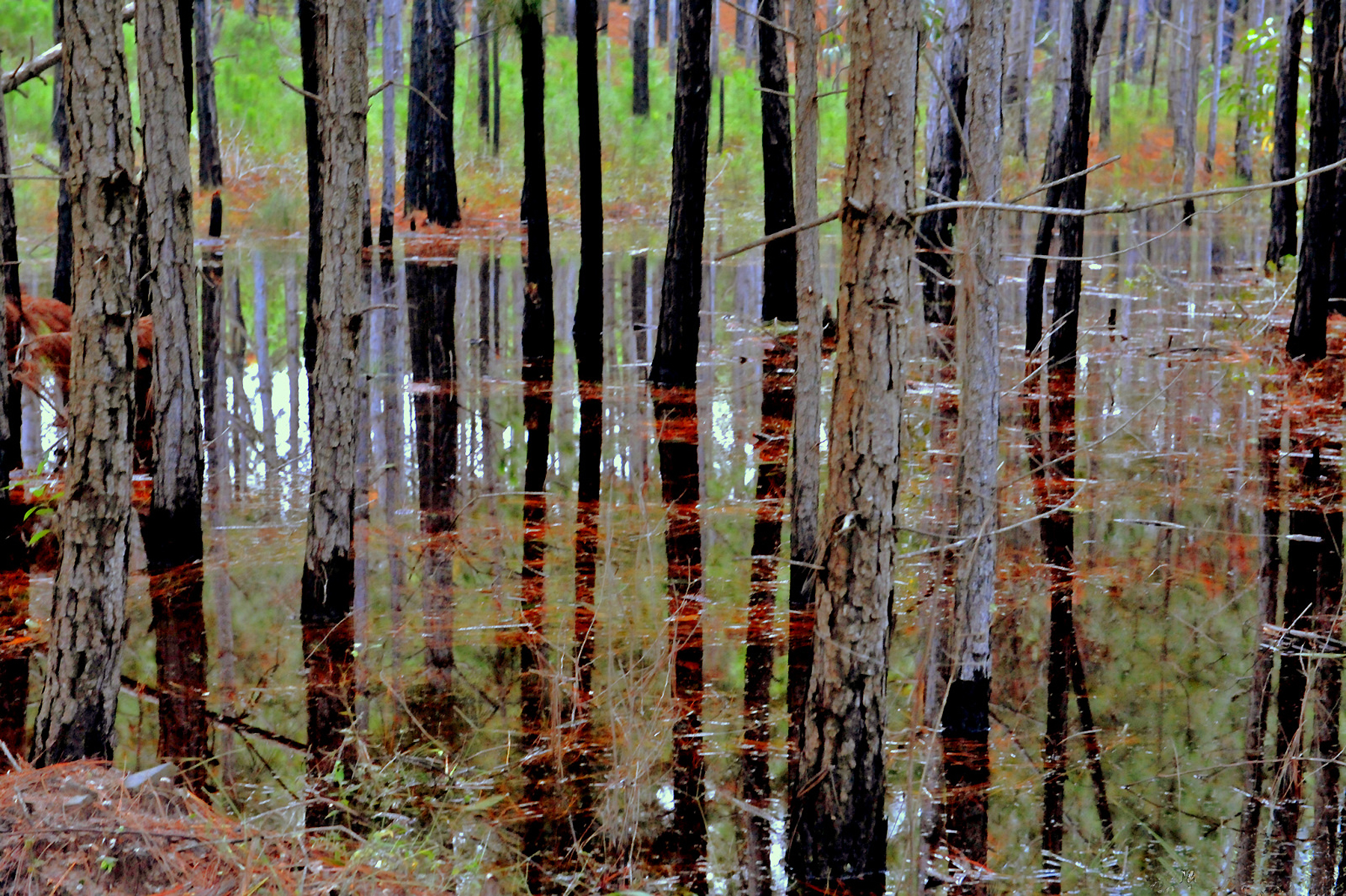
Flooded area

The Rio Vermelho State Park is open to the public from Tuesday to Sunday, 10:00 to 17:00 p.m. The park includes a camping site with 600 spaces, 24 hour security, toilets with hot showers, barbecue grills, restaurant service, laundry and other facilities. From the campsite there is a trail to the beach and another trail of 12 kilometres (7.5 mi) through the forest, with vegetation that includes pines and fragments of Atlantic Forest. The Lagoa da Conceição terminal is 3 kilometres (1.9 mi) from the campsite, with boat transport to the Costa da Lagoa, a traditional community with restaurants and a waterfall.

A 1 kilometre (0.62 mi) ecological trail was opened on World Environment Day, 5 June 2014. It has 16 nurseries holding about 150 wild animals, victims of ill-treatment that had been seized by the environmental police, including monkeys, hawks, macaws and parrots. Admission is free, and the trail has wooden decks to make it accessible to people with difficulty walking. Guided tours are given on the Rio Vermelho Trail, with the guide giving information about the animals and the park. Groups of up to 30 leave every 20 or 30 minutes, with a total of 650 per day. This is considered the maximum to avoid excessive stress on the fauna. The trail has a belvedere looking over the lagoon and flora of the park with toilets and a water fountain. There is a picnic area at the end of the trail.

== Sources ==
- "Camping no Parque do Rio Vermelho é opção de férias para turistas em SC", G1 Globo (in Portuguese), 7 January 2015
- Favareto, Mayra (15 September 2016), Praia do Moçambique e a trilha do Parque Estadual do Rio Vermelho (in Portuguese)
- Parque Estadual do Rio Vermelho (in Portuguese), FATMA: Fundação do Meio Ambiente, archived from the original on 2017-01-20
- Saiba como visitar a Trilha Ecológica do Rio Vermelho (in Portuguese), FATMA: Fundação do Meio Ambiente, 29 May 2014
- "Trilha ecológica é inaugurada no Rio Vermelho em Florianópolis", G1 Globo (in Portuguese), 5 June 2014
