= Prosa State Park =

State park in Mato Grosso do Sul, Brazil

- Parque Estadual do Prosa
- IUCN category II (national park)
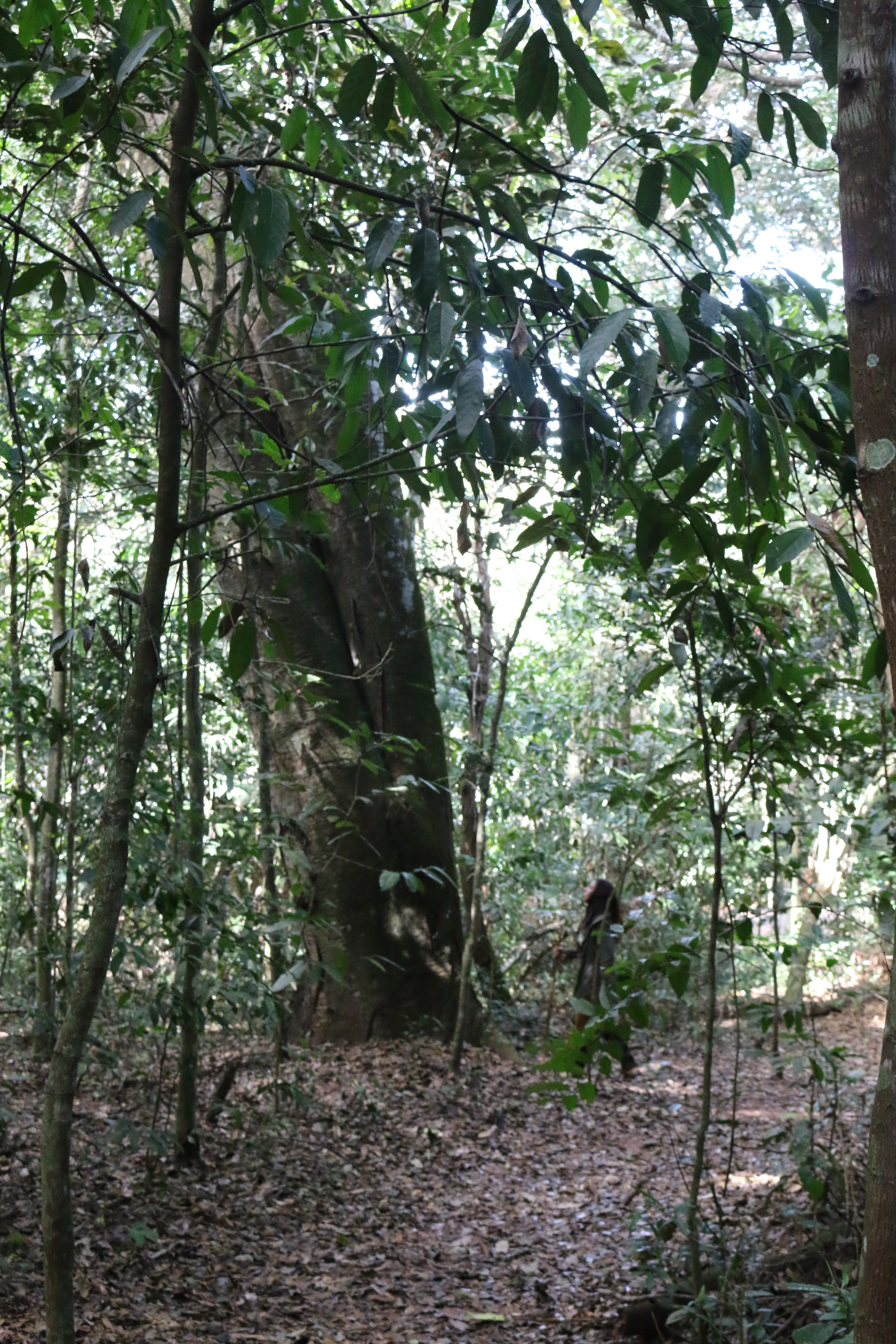
- Vegetation

- Location within Brazil
- Nearest city: Campo Grande, Mato Grosso do Sul
- Coordinates: 20°27′09″S 54°33′38″W
- Area: 135.26 ha (334.2 acres)
- Designation: State park
- Created: 21 May 2002

The Prosa State Park (Portuguese: Parque Estadual do Prosa), formerly the Parque dos Poderes, is an urban state park in the state of Mato Grosso do Sul, Brazil. It protects a remnant of cerrado vegetation, and is home to a wildlife rehabilitation center.

== Location ==
The Prosa State Park is within the urban perimeter of the municipality of Campo Grande, capital of the state of Mato Grosso do Sul. It has an area of 135.26 hectares (334.2 acres). It is surrounded by a buffer zone in which there are restrictions on land use.

== History ==
The area that would become the park was defined as the Parque dos Poderes Ecological Reserve in 1981. It was upgraded to become the Prosa State Park by decree 10.783/2002 of 21 May 2002. Its objectives are to preserve samples of the city's last remnants of cerrado ecosystems, flora and fauna, to protect the sources of the Córrego Prosa and the landscape and cultural heritage of the region, and to support scientific research, environmental education, recreation and tourism in contact with nature. The Management Plan was published in December 2011. In 2012 there were about 10,000 visitors.

== Environment ==
Annual precipitation is from 1,300 to 1,700 millimetres (51 to 67 in). Average annual temperatures are from 20 to 22 °C (68 to 72 °F), ranging from 25 °C (77 °F) in the summer months down to 17 °C (63 °F) in the winter from April to September.

The park provides an important refuge for wildlife, with many resident or migratory species of mammals, reptiles and birds. Mammals include the giant anteater (Myrmecophaga tridactyla), southern tamandua (Tamandua tetradactyla), nine-banded armadillo (Dasypus novemcinctus), big hairy armadillo (Chaetophractus villosus), black-tufted marmoset (Callithrix penicillata), robust capuchin monkey, howler monkey (Bugio), crab-eating fox (Cerdocyon thous), coati, ferret, red brocket (Mazama americana), pampas deer (Ozotoceros bezoarticus), capybara (Hydrochoerus hydrochaeris), Azara's agouti (Dasyprocta azarae), paca, Erinaceidae, tapeti (Sylvilagus brasiliensis), gray four-eyed opossum (Philander opossum), common opossum (Didelphis marsupialis), white-eared opossum (Didelphis albiventris), Pallas's long-tongued bat (Glossophaga soricina) and fruit bat.

There are many species of birds including the rufescent tiger heron (Tigrisoma lineatum), and a variety of reptiles such as the Brazilian lancehead (Bothrops moojeni) and gold tegu (Tupinambis teguixim).

== Visiting ==
The park is open for visits, which must be scheduled, between 8:00 and 17:00 on Tuesday to Saturday. Visitors may see the park by walking along trails with an accredited guide. The Wildlife Rehabilitation Center may only be visited on Tuesdays, Thursdays and Saturdays. Visitors should wear long pants, use insect repellant and bring water. Motor vehicles and bicycles are not allowed, and pets must not be brought into the park. Visitors must not take plants or animals, climb trees, swim, hunt, fish, leave litter or cause any damage to the environment. Research requires authorization from the Environment Institute of Mato Grosso do Sul (Imasul).

== Sources ==
- Nascimento, Ana Carolina Seixas; Moura, Flávia Neri de; Torrecilha, Sylvia (December 2011), Plano de Manejo Parque Estadual do Prosa (PDF) (in Portuguese), Campo Grande-MS: Instituto de Meio Ambiente de Mato Grosso do Sul
- Parque Estadual do Prosa (PEP) (in Portuguese), IMASUL: Instituto de Meio Ambiente de Mato Grosso do Sul, archived from the original on 2017-02-05
- "Parque Estadual do Prosa é aberto para visitação na capital de MS", G1 Globo (in Portuguese), 25 January 2015
