= Palotina =

- Flag

- Coordinates: 24°17′00″S 53°50′23″W

Government
  - Mayor: Luiz Ernesto de Giacometti

Area
  - Total: 651 km^{2} (251 sq mi)
- Elevation: 320 m (1,050 ft)

Population (2020)
  - Total: 32,121
  - Density: 44.5/km^{2} (115/sq mi)
- Time zone: UTC−3 (BRT)
- Postal code: 85950-000

Palotina is a Brazilian municipality in western Paraná state, located around 60 kilometers from the border with Paraguay.

== Location ==
The population is 32,121 inhabitants, as of the 2020 estimate. Owing to highly fertile land, the city is a flourishing agricultural hub and a base for two major agricultural companies: C. Vale and I. Rieddi. Another highlight of Palotina is the campus of the Federal University of Paraná (UFPR). There is also one private university, the UESPAR (União de Ensino Superior do Paraná).

The municipality contains the 385-hectare (950-acre) São Camilo State Park, a conservation unit originally created as a biological reserve in 1990.

== History ==
Settlement in the area started in 1953 when Pinho e Terras started to colonize the area. The settlement began to grow and on July 25, 1960, attained the status of municipality. Pinho e Terras approach to colonization was called exemplary, but in the early 1960s the colonists were besieged by gunmen hired by the "new landowners" affiliated with state governor and Socialist Democratic Party boss Moises Lupion. The federal government moved in a regiment of border guards to pacify the area and in 1963 re-nationalized the disputed lands. The colonists had to buy back their own land.

The name of the municipality comes from Saint Vincent Pallotti, because some priests, who were members of the Society of Catholic Apostolate (SAC), were present during the colonization period. The priests of this society are known to this day as "Pallotines"; hence, the name "Palotina" (feminine form, in Portuguese, of "Pallottine"). Saint Vincent Pallotti is the patron saint of Palotina; a statue of his can be found in the central square of the municipality. The only parish in the municipality, which is made up only of Pallottine priests, is also named after the Saint: in Portuguese, Paróquia São Vicente Pallotti. The parish belongs to the Diocese of Toledo.

The major part of the population is catholic.

Agriciltural economy of Palotina relies on production of corn, wheat and soybean. A 1969 survey placed Palotina in the cluster of most efficient agricultural communities in Brazil. According to authors of the study, higher productivity in this cluster stemmed from raising pigs, which accounts for 68% of its output. 82% of lands were allotted to fodder crops rather than traditional rice, bean and cotton.

Nowadays, Palotina is a near 30k inhabitants municipality with an agroindustrial economy. Most of the population, around 68%, have Italian ancestry and about 13% of the community have German ancestry.

On the morning of 26 July 2023, at the grain cooperative C.Vale exploded, causing 9 employees dead and 11 injuries. Investigation is still ongoing.

== Climate ==
Humid subtropical climate of Palotina (Cfa in Köppen climate classification) is characterized by humid and hot summers, while winters are cool. Precipitation is moderate all year long.

Climate data for Palotina, elevation 310 m (1,020 ft), (1973–2011)
Month	Jan	Feb	Mar	Apr	May	Jun	Jul	Aug	Sep	Oct	Nov	Dec	Year
Record high °C (°F)	39.2 (102.6)	38.8 (101.8)	39.4 (102.9)	36.6 (97.9)	33.8 (92.8)	31.4 (88.5)	33.2 (91.8)	36.2 (97.2)	38.4 (101.1)	39.5 (103.1)	41.2 (106.2)	40.4 (104.7)	41.2 (106.2)
Mean daily maximum °C (°F)	32.0 (89.6)	32.0 (89.6)	31.8 (89.2)	29.3 (84.7)	25.2 (77.4)	23.8 (74.8)	24.3 (75.7)	26.3 (79.3)	27.3 (81.1)	29.6 (85.3)	30.9 (87.6)	31.5 (88.7)	28.7 (83.6)
Daily mean °C (°F)	25.2 (77.4)	24.9 (76.8)	24.4 (75.9)	21.8 (71.2)	18.0 (64.4)	16.5 (61.7)	16.2 (61.2)	17.7 (63.9)	19.6 (67.3)	22.4 (72.3)	23.7 (74.7)	24.8 (76.6)	21.3 (70.3)
Mean daily minimum °C (°F)	20.4 (68.7)	20.2 (68.4)	19.3 (66.7)	16.7 (62.1)	13.0 (55.4)	11.6 (52.9)	10.7 (51.3)	11.9 (53.4)	14.0 (57.2)	16.9 (62.4)	18.1 (64.6)	19.6 (67.3)	16.0 (60.9)
Record low °C (°F)	10.0 (50.0)	10.0 (50.0)	5.0 (41.0)	2.0 (35.6)	−1.6 (29.1)	−3.0 (26.6)	−5.2 (22.6)	−2.8 (27.0)	−2.0 (28.4)	5.0 (41.0)	8.9 (48.0)	9.9 (49.8)	−5.2 (22.6)
Average precipitation mm (inches)	170.7 (6.72)	157.5 (6.20)	112.6 (4.43)	132.0 (5.20)	147.6 (5.81)	108.4 (4.27)	85.3 (3.36)	81.6 (3.21)	134.5 (5.30)	176.8 (6.96)	165.2 (6.50)	169.8 (6.69)	1,642 (64.65)
Average precipitation days (≥ 1.0 mm)	12	12	10	8	9	8	7	7	9	11	10	12	115
Average relative humidity (%)	80	79	76	77	80	81	77	72	70	72	71	77	76
Mean monthly sunshine hours	235.4	203.8	233.7	218.1	202.1	182.3	205.3	211.5	189.3	212.0	234.7	235.1	2,563.3
Source: IDR-Paraná
