= Massairo Okamura State Park =

State park in Cuiabá, Mato Grosso, Brazil

- Parque Estadual Massairo Okamura
- IUCN category VI (protected area with sustainable use of natural resources)
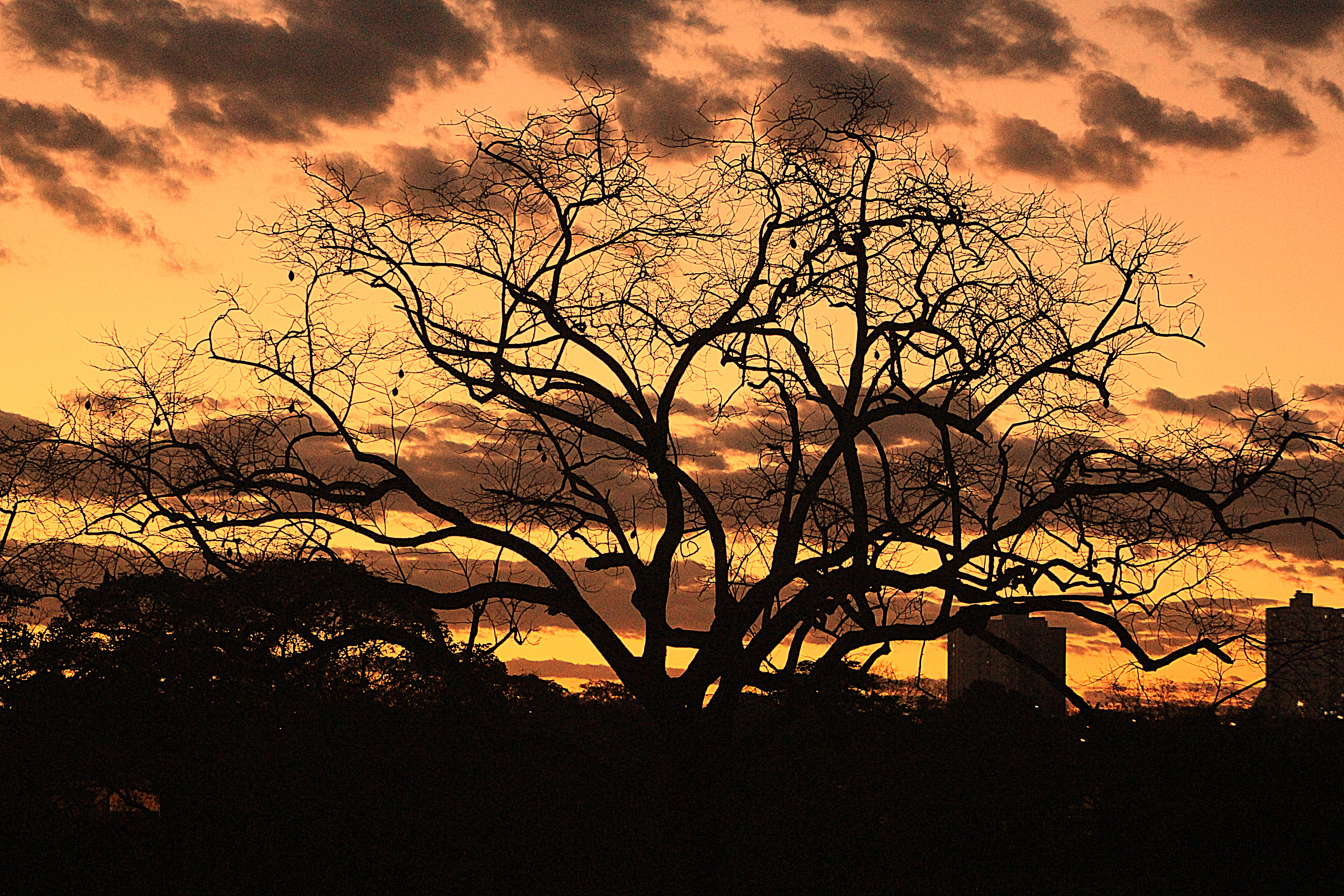

- Location within Brazil
- Nearest city: Cuiabá, Mato Grosso
- Coordinates: 15°34′30″S 56°04′03″W
- Designation: State park
- Created: 1 September 2000
- Administrator: Coordenadoria de Unidades de Conservação, Mato Grosso

The Massairo Okamura State Park (Portuguese: Parque Estadual Massairo Okamura) is a state park in the city of Cuiabá, capital of Mato Grosso, Brazil. It preserves an area of typical cerrado forest in a densely urbanised area.

== Location ==
The Massairo Okamura State Park (Note: The name of the park is a tribute to the former councilman Massairo Okamura who founded the Cuiabana Society of Environment in 1977, the first NGO dedicated to environmental issues.) has an area of 51 ha (130 acres) in the city of Cuiabá, Mato Grosso. It lies to the east of the Avenida Hist. Rubens de Mendonça and north of the Avenida Ver. Juliano de Costa Marques, near the Universidade de Cuiabá, Pantanal. About 500 people visit the park daily. The park includes about 2 km (1.2 mi) of trails, public toilets, a centre for environmental education, administrative facilities and a stage for community activities. The park contains the Praça Nações Indígenas (Indigenous Nations Plaza), a tribute to the Bororo people who inhabited the region in pre-colonial times.

== Environment ==
The park provides a green space with typical cerrado vegetation in the centre of a highly urbanized area, and helps preserve the headwaters of the Barbado and Moinho streams. 129 species of trees or plants have been catalogued along the park trails. They include cerrado species and medicinal plants such as lixeira, jatobá, cumbaru, angico, carvão vermelho, quina, aroeira, oiti (Licania tomentosa) and sete cascas. It is home to howler monkeys.

== History ==
The Massairo Okamura Ecological Reserve was created by law 7.313 of 1 September 2000 as an ecological reserve in the political/administrative centre of the Mato Grosso state government. On 21 September 2001 it was reclassified as the Massairo Okamura State Park. A management plan was published on 31 December 2012, but was not made official through an ordinance. The advisory council was reactivated on 16 December 2014.

== Sources ==
- "Animais silvestres e mata nativa", Diario de Cuiabá (in Portuguese), 4 June 2006
- Noelisa Andreola (24 May 2015), "Parque Massairo Okamura se destaca pela organização", Circuito Mato Grosso (in Portuguese)
- Parque Estadual Massairo Okamura (in Portuguese), Câmara Municipal de Cuiabá
- PES Massairo Okamura (in Portuguese), ISA: Instituto Socioambiental
