= Pedra da Risca do Meio Marine State Park =

State park in Ceará, Brazil

- Parque Estadual Marinho da Pedra da Risca do Meio
- IUCN category II (national park)
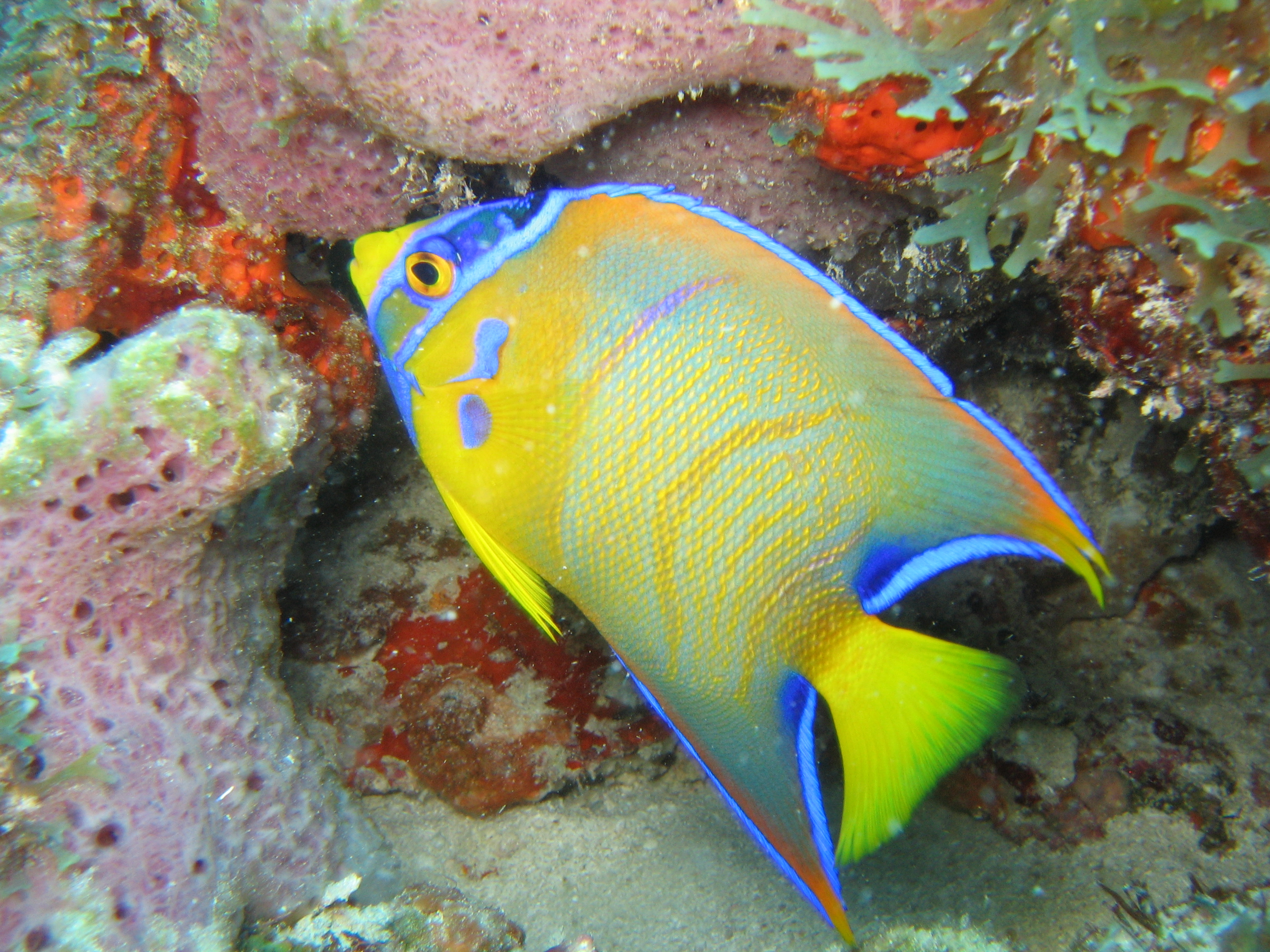
- Ciliaris Brasiliesis, the fish that symbolizes the park

- Location within Brazil
- Nearest city: Fortaleza, Ceará
- Coordinates: 3.6°S 38.4°W
- Area: 3,320 hectares (8,200 acres)
- Designation: State park
- Created: 5 September 1997
- Administrator: SEMACE

The Pedra da Risca do Meio Marine State Park (Portuguese: Parque Estadual Marinho da Pedra da Risca do Meio) is a state park in the state of Ceará, Brazil.

== Location ==
The Pedra da Risca do Meio Marine State Park has an area of 3,320 hectares (8,200 acres), and is about 18.5 kilometres (11.5 mi) in a 60°NE direction from the port of Mucuripe, in Fortaleza. It is contained in a rectangle between 3º33.8"S and 3º36"S, and between 38º21.6"W and 38º26"W. It can be reached by boat from Mucuripe in a boat ride of about 50 minute. Visitors may practice scuba diving and sport fishing.

== History ==
Before the park was created uncontrolled and predatory fishing had caused declining numbers of fish and lobsters, in conflict with the tourist image of Ceará as a place of pristine beaches and reefs. Creation of the park was therefore proposed by several governmental and non-governmental organizations. The Pedra da Risca do Meio Marine State Park was created by state law 12717 of 5 September 1997 to protect an area of reefs, the only marine conservation unit in the state of Ceará. It aims to protect breeding and feeding area for marine species, to rescue artisan fishing, to support research and to promote underwater tourism.

== Environment ==
The substrate consists of sand and gravel with a large aggregation of calcareous and rocky outcrops, typical of the Ceará coastal zone. Depths are 16 to 30 metres (52 to 98 ft) and includes the wreckage of a Bandeirante airplane, considered underwater archaeological heritage and an artificial reef. The rock formations are roughly linear, from 1 to 3 metres (3 ft 3 in to 9 ft 10 in) high and are known as riscas (stripes) by the local fishermen, from which the park is named. Visibility is usually from 15 to 30 metres (49 to 98 ft). There is no land above water.

The park protects a valuable biological refuge with a fragile ecology that supports a diverse population of marine species. The waters are warm, with temperatures varying from 27 to 29 °C (81 to 84 °F). The rocky outcrops support a rich benthic biota, providing food and shelter to many marine species. 116 species of fish have been identified, including 6 elasmobranchii, as well as the common bottlenose dolphin (Tursiops truncatus) and three species of sea turtles. Invertebrates are less well studied, but an initial survey of sponges in 2006 found the endemic species Sigmaxinella cearense, in a genus known only from the Pacific.

== Human impact ==
Artisanal and sport fishing (line and hook) is allowed, as is collection for scientific research purposes and diving with prior authorization. Trawling with nets is banned, as is spear fishing, capture of ornamental fish and disposal of waste. The main threats are from predatory fishing with nets and collection of ornamental fish. The local artisan fishers complain that clandestine boats come for this purposes, mainly from other states.

== Sources ==
- Parque Estadual Marinho da Pedra da Risca do Meio, SEMACE, Governo do Estado do Ceará, archived from the original on 2016-11-29
- Soares, Marcelo de Oliveira; Paiva, Carolina Cerqueira de; Freitas, João Eduardo Pereira de; Lotufo, Tito Monteiro da Cruz (2011), "Gestão de unidades de conservação marinhas: o caso do Parque Estadual Marinho da Pedra da Risca do Meio, NE – Brasil", Revista da Gestão Costeira Integrada, 11 (2)
