= Terra Ronca State Park =

State park in Goiás, Brazil

- Parque Estadual Terra Ronca
- IUCN category II (national park)
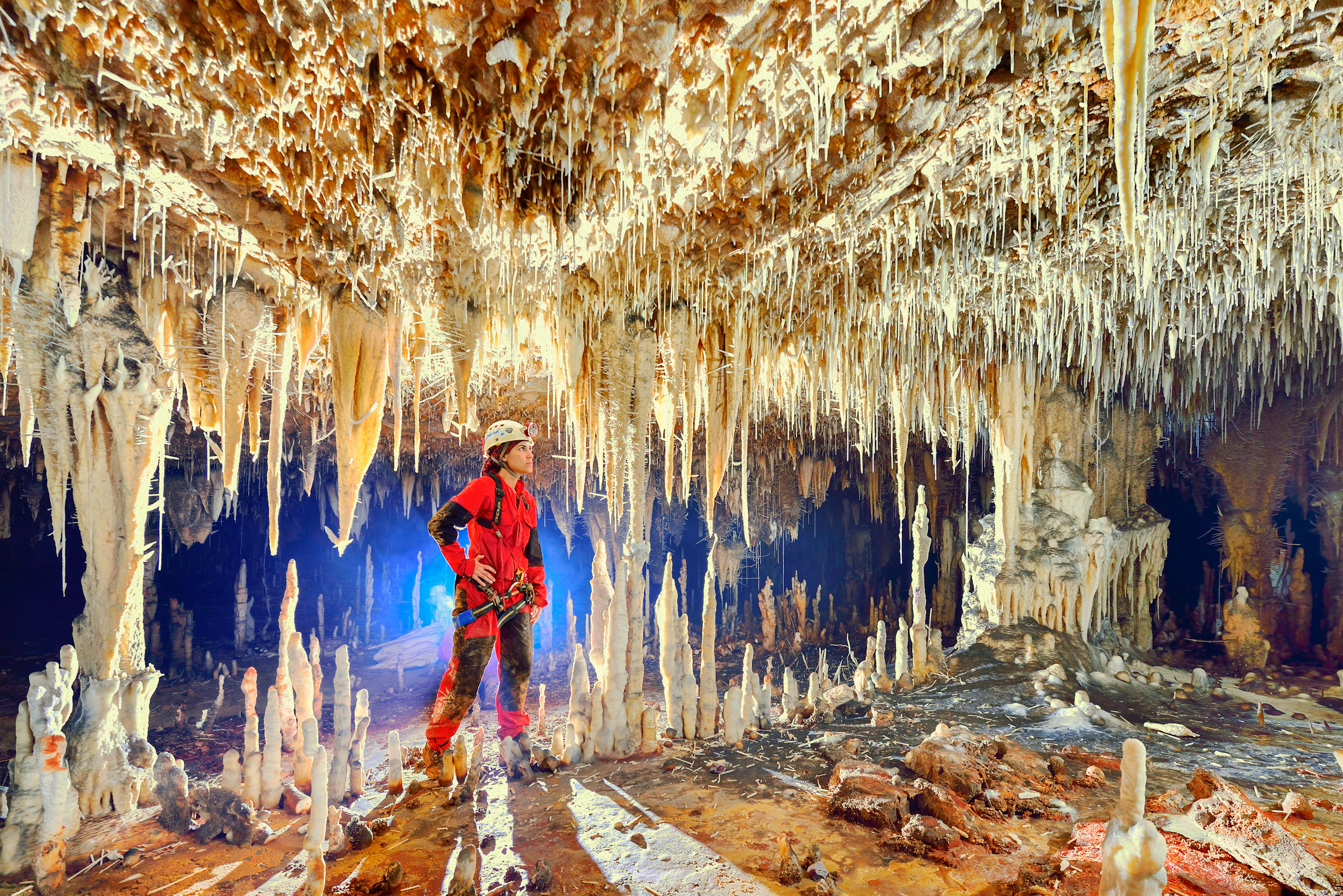
- Salão da Floresta Branca

- Location within Brazil
- Nearest city: São Domingos, Goiás
- Coordinates: 13.621°S 46.387°W
- Designation: State park

The Terra Ronca State Park was created by decree nr. 10,879 of 7 July 1989 and had its area and boundaries established by decree nr. 4,700 of 21 August 1996, covering the municipality of São Domingos. Around the state park they created the environmental protection area (APA) of the Serra Geral, by decree nr. 4,666 of 16 April 1996. The areas of these two protected areas are of restricted use and regularly monitored and audited by the Agência Goiana de Meio Ambiente e Recursos Naturais, covering respectively 57,018 and 40,000 hectares (140,890 and 98,840 acres).

The implementation of the park and the APA has as their main focus the protection of all the natural complex of the region composed of numerous caves with a rich system of speleothems, springs and rivers of clear waters that run inside and outside the caves, as well the diverse flora and fauna of the region, offering a spectacle for the vastness of countless species, including some endemic ones. The area of the park falls within the domain morphology of the Brazilian Central Plateau, northwest of the state of Goiás, on the border with the state of Bahia.
