= São Camilo State Park =

State park in Paraná, Brazil

- Parque Estadual de São Camilo
- IUCN category II (national park)
- Location within Brazil
- Nearest city: Palotina, Paraná
- Coordinates: 24°18′48″S 53°54′49″W
- Area: 385 hectares (950 acres)
- Designation: State park
- Created: 22 February 1990

São Camilo State Park (Portuguese: Parque Estadual de São Camilo), formerly the São Camilo Biological Reserve (Portuguese: Reserva Biológica de São Camilo), is a state park in the state of Paraná, Brazil.

== Location ==
The São Camilo Biological Reserve was created on 22 February 1990, with an area of 385 hectares (950 acres) in the municipality of Palotina, Paraná. Responsibility for administration was given to the Paraná Institute of Lands, Cartography and Forests, with participation by the Paraná Agronomic Institute. Soon after its establishment the area began to be visited by the local people for recreational purposes. This is not legally allowed for a biological reserve. To allow for visitors and environmental education while still preserving the local biodiversity, the status was changed to State Park.

== Conservation ==
The purpose of the biological reserve is to preserve the fauna and flora. Exploitation of the reserve and changes to the environment were originally prohibited. The park contains vegetation in an advanced stage of recovery. As one of the last fragments of forest of any size in the region it is a haven for wildlife. It is included in the Caiuá – Ilha Grande Biodiversity Corridor.

== Sources ==
- Álvaro Dias (22 February 1990), "Decreto Nº 6.595 de 22 de Fevereiro de 1990" (PDF), Diário Oficial (in Portuguese)
- Parque Estadual de São Camilo (in Portuguese), IAP: Instituto Ambiental do Paraná
