= Ibiporã State Park =

State park in Paraná, Brazil

- Parque Estadual de Ibiporã
- IUCN category II (national park)
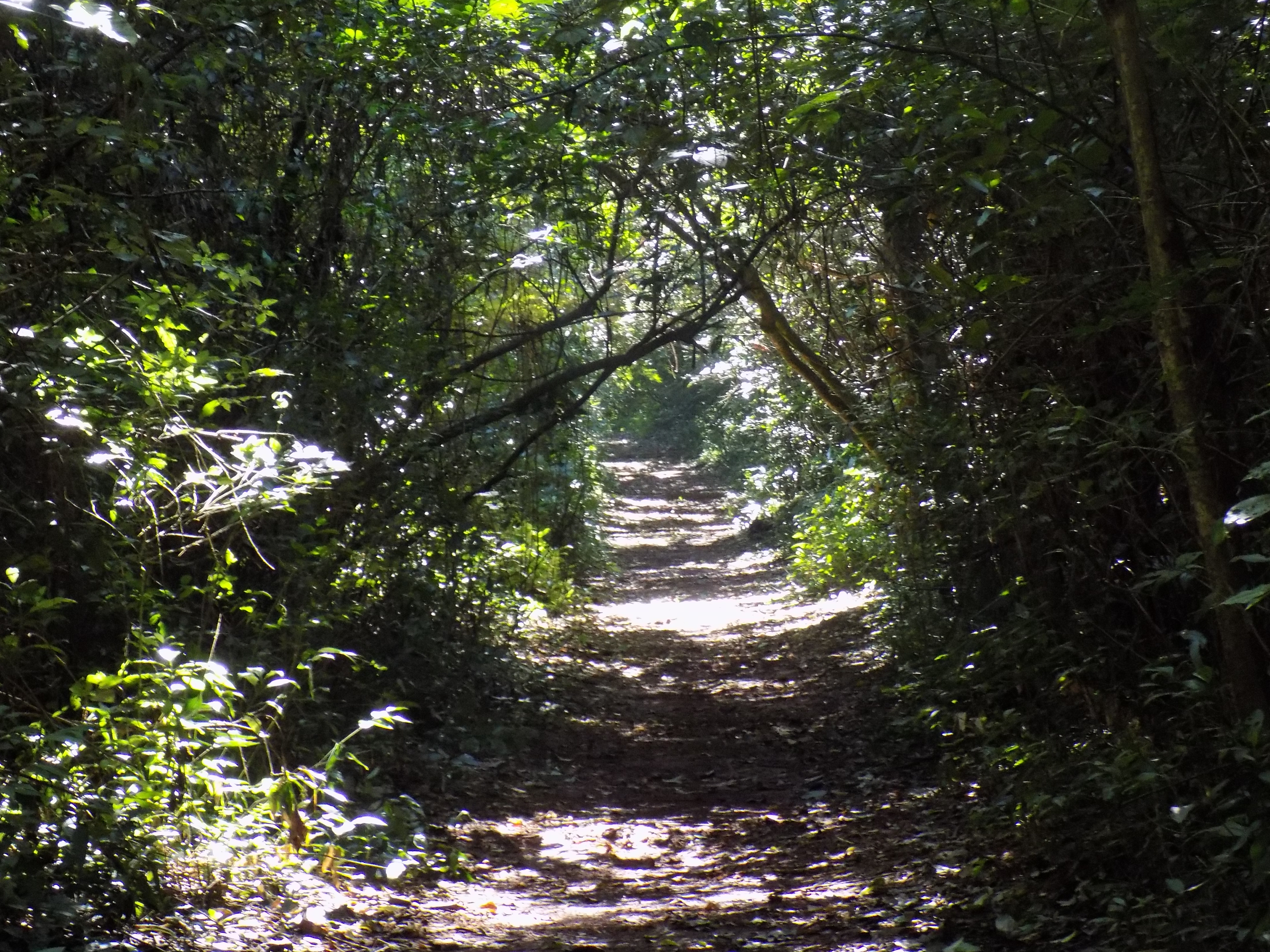
- Trail in the park

- Location within Brazil
- Nearest city: Ibiporã, Paraná
- Coordinates: 23°15′23″S 51°01′53″W
- Area: 74 ha (180 acres)
- Designation: State park
- Created: 30 April 1980
- Administrator: IAP: Instituto Ambiental do Paraná

The Ibiporã State Park (Portuguese: Parque Estadual de Ibiporã) is a state park in the state of Paraná, Brazil.

== Location ==
The Ibiporã State Park is in the municipality of Ibiporã, Paraná. It has an area of 74.05 hectares (183.0 acres). It lies to the northeast of the urban area, bounded by the cemetery of the Vila Ipê district to the southwest, the BR-369 highway to the south and the PR-862 road to the north. The park is in the Tibagi River basin.

== History ==
The Ibiporã Forest Park (Parque Florestal de Ibiporã) was created by governor Ney Braga by decree 2.301 of 30 April 1980, with an area of 74.0575 hectares (183.000 acres). The Institute of Lands and Cartography of the State of Paraná (ITC) was to administer the park. A planning document was prepared in 1988. On 23 January 2012 Governor Carlos Alberto Richa changed the management category by decree 3741 to the federally defined "state park" category. The Paraná Environment Institute (IAP) was responsible for administration. A formal management plan was published in 2015.

== Environment ==
The park protects an area of seasonal semi-deciduous forest in the Atlantic Forest biome. The main families of trees in the region are Leguminosae, Meliaceae, Moraceae, Phytolaccaceae, Myrtaceae, Lauraceae, Euphorbiaceae, Rubiaceae, Rutaceae and Sapotaceae. The forest also contains significant numbers of number of vascular epiphytes in the Orchidaceae, Polypodiaceae and Bromeliaceae families, particularly near to water courses and pools. Fauna have not been well studied, but are assumed to consist mainly of species that are relatively insensitive to human activities.

== Visiting ==
The park has a visitor center, parking, trails, huts, kiosks, toilets and drinking fountains. There is a nursery for seedlings of various native species and a ranger's house. Activities include scientific research, environmental education, and hiking.

== Sources ==
- Braga, Ney; Stephanes, Reinhold (30 April 1980), Decreto nº 2.301, de 30 de Abril de 1980 (PDF) (in Portuguese)
- Richa, Carlos Alberto; Amaral, Durval; Iurk, Jonel Nazareno (23 January 2012), Decreto 3741 - 23 de Janeiro de 2012 (in Portuguese)
- Rocha, Maria do Rocio Lacerda (2015), Plano de Manejo do Parque Estadual de Ibiporã (PDF) (in Portuguese), IAP
