= Serra da Tiririca State Park =

State park in Rio de Janeiro, Brazil

- Parque Estadual da Serra da Tiririca
- IUCN category II (national park)
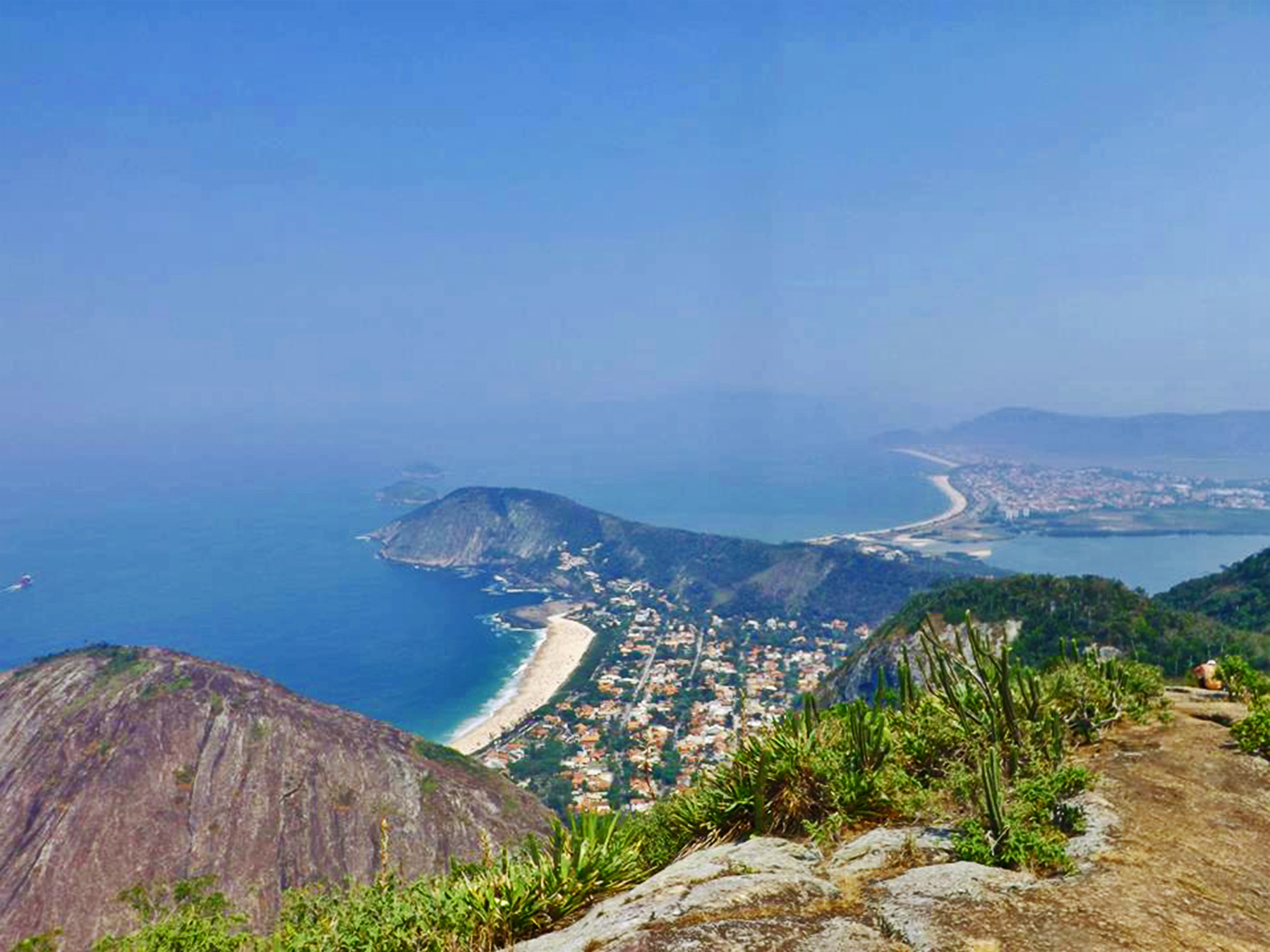
- View from the top of the Pedra do Elefante

- Location within Brazil
- Nearest city: Niterói, Rio de Janeiro
- Coordinates: 22°58′24″S 43°01′41″W
- Area: 3,493 ha (13.49 sq mi)
- Designation: State park
- Created: 29 November 1991

The Serra da Tiririca State Park (Portuguese: Parque Estadual da Serra da Tiririca) is a state park in the state of Rio de Janeiro, Brazil. It protects an area of rugged terrain on the Atlantic coast with Atlantic Forest vegetation.

== Location ==
The Serra da Tiririca State Park is divided between the municipalities of Niterói and Maricá, Rio de Janeiro. It has an area of 3,493 hectares (8,630 acres). This includes a marine park that extends 1,700 metres (5,600 ft) offshore between Pontas do Alto Mourão and Costão de Itacoatiara. It has rugged terrain with slopes above 50° in some places. The average altitude is around 286 metres (938 ft). The park includes eight hills, namely Morro do Elefante: 412 metres (1,352 ft), Alto Mourão: 369 metres (1,211 ft), Costão de Itacoatiara: 217 metres (712 ft), Morro do Telégrafo: 357 metres (1,171 ft), Morro do Catumbi: 325 metres (1,066 ft), Morro da Penha: 128 metres (420 ft) and Morro da Serrinha: 277 metres (909 ft).

== History ==
The Serra da Tiririca region has many archaeological sites, particularly in Itaipu, which has important sambaquis (middens) left by different groups of indigenous people. When European settlers arrived the region was inhabited by Tamoios people. In the mid-16th century the Jesuits erected buildings in Itaipu to catechize the local people. Charles Darwin commented on the biological diversity when he visited in 1832 en route to Cabo Frio.

Creation of the park was due to a campaign by civil society against damage to the environment that began in the early 1980s and included environmental groups, residents' associations and other residents of the region. A Public Civil Action, the first in Brazil, was filed by the Public Prosecutor against an illegal subdivision. The Tiririca Front was active in 1989-90 but lost support due to its overly politicized activity. After this the Ecological Citizenship Movement (MCE) led development of a study to prepare the technical and legal basis for the park, including a draft built that was forwarded to the state legislature through Carlos Minc.

The Serra da Tiririca State Park was created by state law 1.902 of 29 November 1991 with the objective of protecting the Atlantic Forest vegetation, sources of watercourses and fauna. The provisional limits were defined by state decree 18.598 of 19 April 1993. On 10 October 1992 UNESCO recognized the park as part of the Atlantic Forest Biosphere Reserve. A 386-page guide to the park was published in June 2016 describing all the trails in the park, with 15 trails described in detail.

== Environment ==
The vegetation of the Serra da Tiririca is in the Atlantic Forest biome, consisting of dense montane or submontane rainforest. This type of forest formation occurs at altitudes from 50 to 500 metres (160 to 1,640 ft) in the coastal region of the Serra do Mar. Vegetation includes forest, with trees such as ipê-amarelo and quaresmeira, restingas, mangroves and marshes. There are more than 150 species of birds, and many species of amphibians, reptiles and small mammals.

== Visiting ==
The park is open daily from 07:00 to 18:00, or 19:00 in summer. The visitor's reception center is in the Itacoatiara neighborhood of Niterói. Darwin's route is now the 2.2 kilometres (1.4 mi) Darwin Trail from Engenho do Mato in Niterói to Itaocaia in Maricá. Other trails in the park lead to lookouts over the city of Rio de Janeiro and the beaches of Niterói and Maricá. Visitors may practice extreme sports such as rappelling and rock climbing.

== Sources ==
- "Livro reúne todas as trilhas do parque da Serra da Tiririca, em Niterói", O Globo (in Portuguese), 20 June 2016
- Parque Estadual da Serra da Tiririca (in Portuguese), UERJ: Universidade do Estado do Rio de Janeiro, archived from the original on 2017-04-26
- Vincenti, Marcel (7 April 2011), "No Parque Estadual da Serra da Tiririca, turistas encontram natureza que atraiu Darwin", UOL Viagem (in Portuguese)
