= Barracão, Rio Grande do Sul =

Municipality of Rio Grande do Sul, Brazil

Barracão
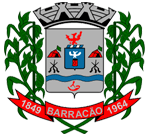
- Flag Coat of arms

- Coordinates: 27°40′18″S 51°27′38″W
- Country: Brazil
- State: Rio Grande do Sul

Area
  - Total: 515.5 km^{2} (199.0 sq mi)
- Elevation: 764 m (2,507 ft)

Population (2020)
  - Total: 5,256
  - Density: 10.20/km^{2} (26.41/sq mi)

Barracão is a municipality in the state of Rio Grande do Sul, Brazil.

The municipality contains the 1,332-hectare (3,290-acre) Espigão Alto State Park created in 1949.

== See also ==
- List of municipalities in Rio Grande do Sul
