= Philcoxia =

Scientific classification
- Kingdom: Plantae
- Clade: Tracheophytes
- Clade: Angiosperms
- Clade: Eudicots
- Clade: Asterids
- Order: Lamiales
- Family: Plantaginaceae
- Tribe: Gratioleae
- Genus: Philcoxia; P.Taylor & V.C.Souza

Species
- Philcoxia bahiensis Philcoxia goiasensis Philcoxia minensis Philcoxia tuberosa Philcoxia rhizomatosa Philcoxia maranhensis Philcoxia courensis

Genus of carnivorous plants

Philcoxia is a genus of seven rare plant species in the Plantaginaceae that are endemic to Brazil and resemble terrestrial species of the genus Utricularia. The genus, formally described in 2000, consists of the species P. bahiensis, P. goiasensis, P. minensis, P. tuberosa, P. rhizomatosa, P. maranhensis and P. courensis, each of the first three named for the Brazilian state to which it is endemic. The species are characterized by subterranean stems, peltate leaves at or below the soil surface, and five-lobed calyces. Their habitat has been reported as areas of white sand in the midst of cerrado vegetation at an elevation between 800 and 1450 m. Initial descriptions of the genus included suspicions that the plethora of stalked capitate glands on the upper surfaces of leaves was an indication that these species may be carnivorous. A study published in 2007 tested P. minensis for protease activity, a typical test for the carnivorous syndrome, and could detect none. Later studies detected other digestive enzymes such as phosphatases and qualitatively assessed prey digestion and nutrient uptake, suggesting that it is a true carnivorous plant. The genus epithet honors David Philcox (1926-2003), a botanist at Kew Gardens who worked extensively in tropical Scrophulariaceae.

== Description ==
Members of the genus are small perennial or annual herbs that reside in oases of deep white sand surrounded by the typical vegetation of the cerrado ecoregion. They are no more than 26 cm tall with 5-10 leaves. Zigzag-shaped racemes are produced from upright stems and account for the height of the species. These monotelic inflorescences are leafless and produce pale blue to lilac flowers (P. goiasensis has a yellow corolla tube). The flowers possess monothecous, glabrous anthers, which are unusual in the family. The upper surface of the leaves are covered with stalked capitate glands that are also seen in many carnivorous plant genera.

== Taxonomy ==
The nature of Philcoxia's highly specialized morphology has led to confusion about its proper taxonomic placement. In 1996, before Philcoxia was even formally published as a taxon, it had been placed by Vinícius Souza in the tribe Scrophularieae of the Scrophulariaceae. Peter Taylor et al. later noted in the 2000 description of the genus that its affinities should include the genera Gratiola and Dopatrium in the tribe Gratioleae of the Scrophulariaceae. The Angiosperm Phylogeny Group later changed the circumscription of the Scrophulariaceae so that the tribe Gratioleae is now within the Plantaginaceae. In 2004, E. Fischer also placed in tribe Gratioleae, but also placed it within the informally recognized subtribe Dopatriinae, which was described as also containing the genera Deinostema, Dopatrium, Hydrotriche, and Limnophila, which consist mostly of aquatic species. In 2007, an extensive study and phylogenetic analysis by Peter Fritsch et al. confirmed that Philcoxia should be placed in the tribe Gratioleae, but it is in fact not as closely related to Gratiola and the Dopatriinae as was previously assumed. Recent research has suggested that P. minensis may be polyphyletic, so may represent more than one species.

== Botanical history ==
The first recognized specimens of Philcoxia (P. bahiensis) were collected by local resident Wilson Ganev in August 1992 from the Serra do Atalho in the municipality of Piatã of Bahia. One collection was sent to Kew Gardens for naming. Because of its placentation, the specimen was determined to be a member of the Scrophulariaceae (later Plantaginaceae sensu APG II) despite its appearance close to that of terrestrial Utricularia. Material of this specimen had been sent to Vinícius Souza, who was working on the Scrophulariaceae of Brazil. Souza recognized the material as congeneric with a plant collected in 1981 from the Serra do Cabral of the Brazilian state Minas Gerais. The collection was made by a group from the University of São Paulo. The site location of that collection was not identified and subsequent expeditions were unable to relocate the species until 2007.

However, an even earlier specimen now recognized as P. goiasensis had been collected in 1966 near Posse in the northeastern state of Goiás by a group from the New York Botanical Garden. Initially, the specimen had been determined to be a member of the Lentibulariaceae. Peter Taylor and David Philcox later concluded that this represented an undescribed genus of Scrophulariaceae. A description and illustration was completed and set aside for over twenty years. Then, in 1994, Taylor showed the specimen and description to Ray Harley in preparation for publication. Harley, who had been involved in the early 1990s discovery of P. bahiensis, recognized Taylor's materials as another species of the as yet undescribed genus.

== Carnivory ==
Peter Taylor, in his 2000 description of the genus, suggested that the morphology of Philcoxia resembles that of the carnivorous Lentibulariaceae and the relatively unrelated Droseraceae in some aspects. The upper surface of the leaves are covered in stalked capitate glands similar to those seen in other carnivorous plants. Taylor noted that field observations had not indicated that there was any carnivorous function of the leaves, citing a lack of captured prey as evidence.

Peter Fritsch and his coauthors decided to do a more comprehensive test for carnivory on P. minensis after they observed nematode worms on leaf surfaces. The similarity between the habitat for Philcoxia species and that of Genlisea and their similar subterranean leaves and stems spurred the team's decision to test for potential carnivory in the field and in situ. They tested for a protease enzyme that is one of the enzymes found in other carnivorous plants and is responsible for breaking down captured prey. They hypothesized that Philcoxia could be carnivorous, capturing nematodes and possibly soil microbes like Utricularia and Genlisea do. Ultimately, Fritsch's study concluded that while no protease activity was detected, this fact does not rule out the possibility that the genus may be carnivorous in some other way. They note that there are many possibilities, such as seasonal carnivory or the unusual growth form being an adaptation to the heat and sun, and more study is needed before precise conclusions can be reached.

A study by Caio G. Pereira et al. published in 2012 provided experimental evidence using ^{15}N-labeled nematodes, concluding that P. minensis actively digests prey and absorbs the nutrients. This data was combined with the observation that the leaf surfaces of P. minensis produce phosphatases, similar to many other carnivorous plants. The similarity in structures in all the species of this genus suggest that all species are carnivorous.
