= Polystictus =

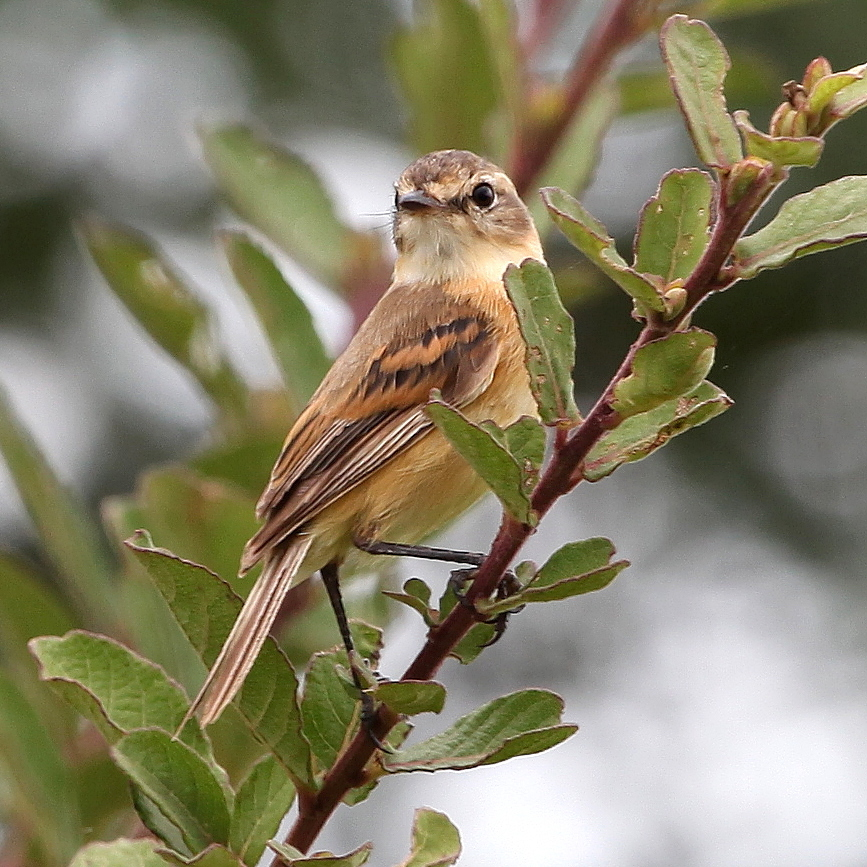
Polystictus pectoralis, bearded tachuri

Polystictus may refer to:

- Polystictus (bird), a genus of birds in the family Tyrannidae
- Polystictus (fungus), a genus of fungi in the family Hymenochaetaceae
