= Rio Preto State Park =

State park in Minas Gerais, Brazil

- Parque Estadual do Rio Preto
- IUCN category II (national park)
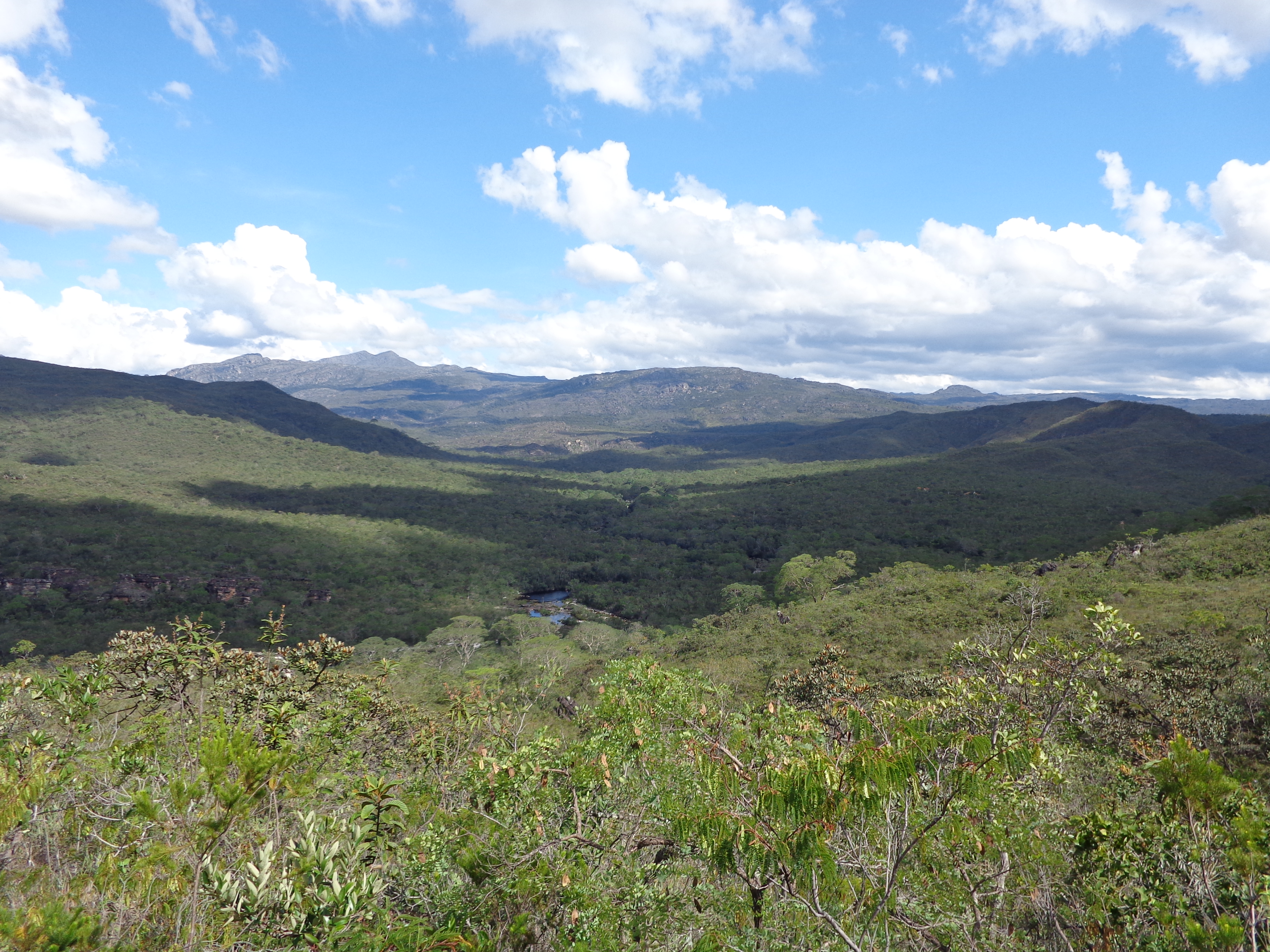
- View of the park

- Location within Brazil
- Nearest city: São Gonçalo do Rio Preto, Minas Gerais
- Coordinates: 18°10′30″S 43°20′41″W
- Area: 12,184 ha (47.04 sq mi)
- Designation: State park
- Created: 1 June 1994
- Administrator: IEF: Instituto Estadual de Florestas

The Rio Preto State Park (Portuguese: Parque Estadual do Rio Preto) is a state park in the state of Minas Gerais, Brazil. It protects a mountainous area of cerrado vegetation that is home to various endemic, rare or endangered species. Trails provide environmental interpretation, and lead to lookouts that give panoramic views, to rivers and waterfalls, and to archaeological sites with rock paintings.

== Location ==
The Rio Preto State Park is in the municipality of São Gonçalo do Rio Preto, Minas Gerais, 70 kilometres (43 mi) from Diamantina. It has an area of 12,184 hectares (30,110 acres). It is 355 kilometres (221 mi) from Belo Horizonte, the state capital. A section of a 1,400 kilometres (870 mi) colonial-era Estrada Real (Royal Road) passed through the park, and traces still remain. This was a route used by gold and diamond prospectors.

The park covers part of the Espinhaço Mountains. It has a rugged relief with quartz rocks that form beautiful cliffs. The park holds several springs, notably that of the Rio Preto, one of the main tributaries of the Araçuaí River, which in turn is a tributary of the Jequitinhonha River. The abundant watercourses form waterfalls, natural pools, rapids, sinkholes, canyons and fluvial beaches with white sands.

== History ==
The Rio Preto was declared a "permanently protected river" in 1991 in response to demand from the local community. The Rio Preto State Park was created by decree 35.611 of 1 June 1994, with an area of 10,755 hectares (26,580 acres). It was opened to visitors in 2002. Decree 44.175 of 20 December 2005 enlarged the area of the park. The park became part of the Espinhaço Mosaic of conservation units, created in 2010.

In April 2013, the Public Ministry and Justice department of Minas Gerais charged that the State Forestry Institute had been failing to comply with environmental legislation. There were serious problems such as lack of a management plan, physical structures and personnel, and land tenure issues with the ecological stations of Mata do Acauã and Mata dos Ausentes and the state parks of Biribiri, Alto Cariri, Rio Preto and Serra Negra.

== Environment ==
The park includes lands that used to be the Boleiras, Alecrim and Curral farms. Former activities included animal husbandry, capture of live animals and collection of wild fruits. Average annual precipitation is 1,500 millimetres (59 in), with more than 90% falling between October and March. Average annual temperatures ranges from 18 to 30 °C (64 to 86 °F), with cooler temperatures in the dry season.

Vegetation is characteristic of the cerrado, including leaning, twisted trees with irregular, distorted branches from 3 to 6 metres (9.8 to 19.7 ft) high. Lower trees are found at altitudes above 900 metres (3,000 ft) and between rock outcrops. Semi-deciduous trees are found in the stream valleys. The eastern part of the park has flora found in the Atlantic Forest. The park's vegetation in mostly cerrado and alpine tundra. Flora include monjolo, pau pereira, candeia, sucupira, pau d'óleo, peroba, ipê, araticum, carvalho and various species of evergreens.

Endemic birds include the hyacinth visorbearer (Augastes scutatus), Cipo canastero (Asthenes luizae) and serra finch (Embernagra longicauda). The burrowing owl (Athene cunicularia), masked water tyrant (Fluvicola nengeta) and grassland sparrow (Ammodramus humeralis) are also found. Mammals include endangered species such as the maned wolf (Chrysocyon brachyurus), giant anteater (Myrmecophaga tridactyla), giant armadillo (Priodontes maximus) and ocelot (Leopardus pardalis). Other mammals include cougar (Puma concolor) and deer. There are native species of fish, including the jundiá, discovered in Rio Preto and still poorly researched.

== Visiting ==
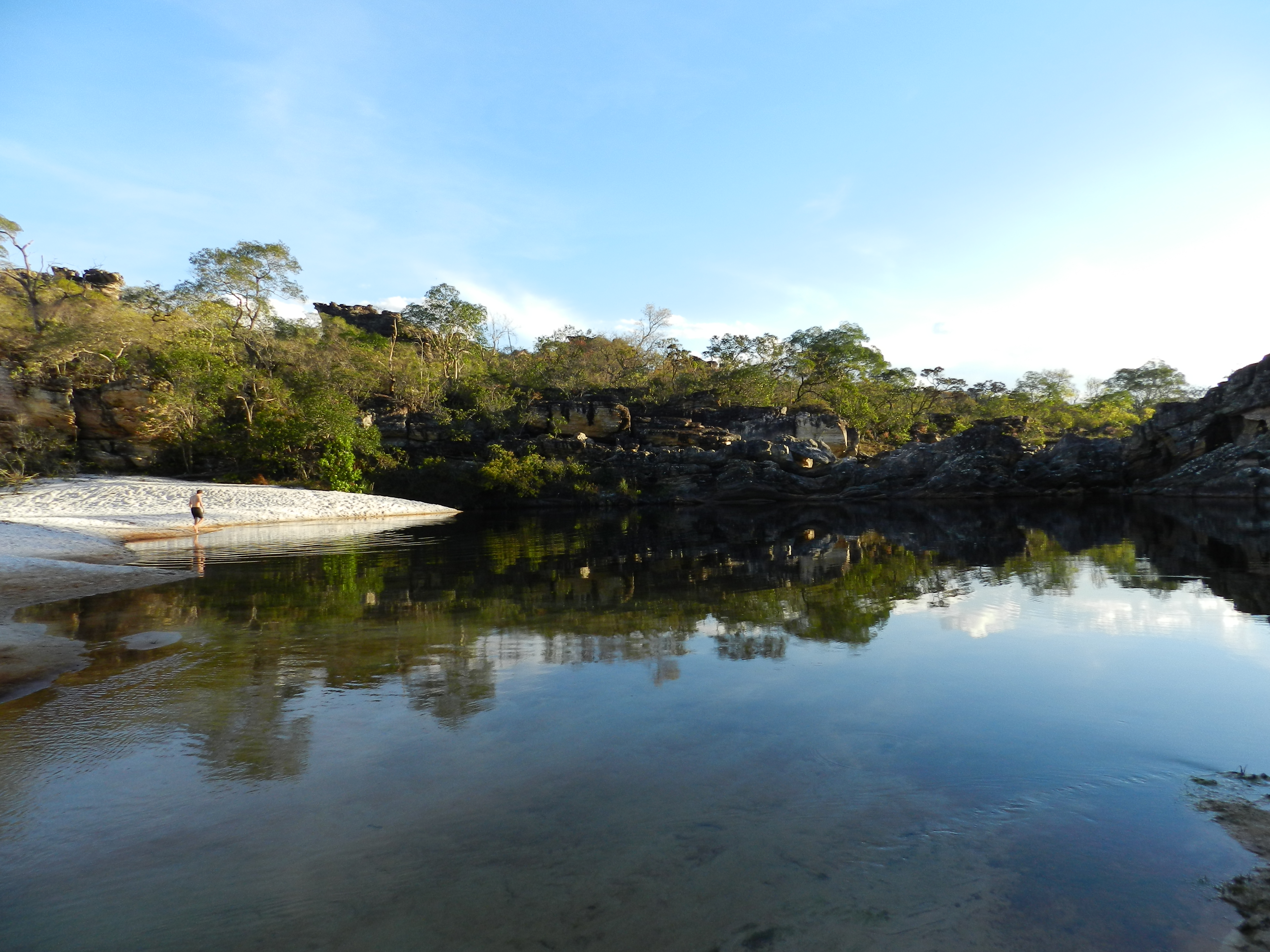
Beach on the Rio Preto

The park is open from 07:00 to 17:00 from Tuesday to Sunday. The park has a well-equipped visitor center with an auditorium for 70 people, meeting rooms and an exhibition hall. There is parking and a restaurant, twelve lodges that can accommodate 52 people, a camping area with room for 25 tents, kiosks, grills and changing rooms. Lodgings and camp spaces must be reserved in advance. Attractions include the Crioulo and Sempre Viva waterfalls, rock paintings and natural lookouts.

There are various trails including the 550 metres (1,800 ft) children's trail and the 46 kilometres (29 mi) cerrado trail, both with places for swimming. Four trails of varying difficulty lead to archaeological sites with rock paintings. Other trails lead to lookouts with panoramic views of different areas in and around the park, and to rivers and waterfalls. The best time to visit is in the cooler and drier season from April to October.

== Sources ==
- MPMG cobra na Justiça a estruturação de unidades de conservação e proteção ambiental do estado (in Portuguese), MPMG, 4 October 2013, archived from the original on 2016-05-14
- "Parque Estadual do Rio Preto", Descubra Minas (in Portuguese)
- Parque Estadual do Rio Preto (in Portuguese), IEF: Instituto Estadual de Florestas, archived from the original on 2017-02-02
- Teixeira, Izabella (26 November 2010), Portaria no- 444, de 26 de Novembro de 2010 (PDF) (in Portuguese), archived from the original (PDF) on 2017-02-02
