= Mata dos Ausentes Ecological Station =

State administered ecological station in Brazil

- Estação Ecológica Mata dos Ausentes
- IUCN category Ia (strict nature reserve)
- Location within Brazil
- Nearest city: Itamarandiba, Minas Gerais
- Coordinates: 17°58′08″S 43°09′04″W
- Area: 498 hectares (1,230 acres)
- Designation: Ecological station
- Created: 23 September 1974

Mata dos Ausentes Ecological Station (Portuguese: Estação Ecológica Mata dos Ausentes) is a state-administered ecological station in Minas Gerais, Brazil.

== Location ==
The station was created by decree on 23 September 1974, modified on 28 December 1994. It covers 498 hectares (1,230 acres). It lies in the municipality of Senador Modestino Gonçalves, Minas Gerais. It is part of the Espinhaço Mosaic. Other units in this mosaic are the Sempre Vivas National Park, Serra do Cabral, Biribiri, Rio Preto, Pico do Itambé and Serra Negra state parks, and the Água das Vertentes, Felício dos Santos and Rio Manso Environmental Protection Areas.

The station is within the Jequitinhonha River valley, in the basin of the Araçuaí River. It lies in an area where there is intense human activity and provides an important refuge for local fauna. The vegetation is mainly fields, dense cerrado and remains of the Atlantic Forest. Fauna include giant anteater, giant armadillo, maned wolf and ocelot.

== Conservation issues ==
In April 2013, the Public Ministry and Justice department of Minas Gerais charged that the State Forestry Institute had been failing to comply with environmental legislation. There were serious problems such as lack of a management plan, physical structures and personnel, and land tenure issues with the ecological stations of Mata dos Ausentes and Mata do Acauã and the state parks of Biribiri, Alto Cariri, Rio Preto and Serra Negra.

In April 2014, the state government established a working group to coordinate regularization of "vacant" land in ten state conservation units including the Mata dos Ausentes Ecological Station. "Vacant" land is land that has never been privately owned, even though occupied. Streams that rise in the reserve feed the Itapirapuã, one of the main tributaries of the Itanguá River.

In August 2015, a project was under way to recover the Itapirapuã, which had been damaged by cattle trampling the banks, destruction of the riparian forests to make charcoal, sand mining and dumping of domestic sewage and solid waste.

== Sources ==
- "Estação Ecológica Mata dos Ausentes", Ambiente Brasil (in Portuguese), 5 May 2010
- Estação Ecológica Mata dos Ausentes (in Portuguese), IEF Minas Gerais, archived from the original on 2019-01-01
- IEF (3 April 2014), Minas inicia regularizacao de terras devolutas no interior de unidades de conservacao estaduais
- MPMG cobra na Justiça a estruturação de unidades de conservação e proteção ambiental do estado (in Portuguese), MPMG, 4 October 2013, archived from the original on 2016-05-14
- "Projeto envolve comunidades e dá bom exemplo na recuperação de córrego no município de Itamarandiba", Aconteceu No Vale (in Portuguese), 20 August 2015
- UNIDADES DE CONSERVAÇÃO - MOSAICO DO ESPINHAÇO: ALTO JEQUITINHONHA - SERRA DO CABRAL (in Portuguese), ICMBio
