= Philcoxia minensis =

Scientific classification
- Kingdom: Plantae
- Clade: Tracheophytes
- Clade: Angiosperms
- Clade: Eudicots
- Clade: Asterids
- Order: Lamiales
- Family: Plantaginaceae
- Genus: Philcoxia
- Species: P. minensis

Binomial name
- Philcoxia minensis V.C.Souza & Guil.

Species of carnivorous plant

Philcoxia minensis is a rare annual herb of the family Plantaginaceae, that is endemic to the Serra do Cabral area of the Brazilian state Minas Gerais. It was discovered April 17, 1981 by David philcox. in the municipality of Joaquim Felício and grew near other plants from the campos rupestres (rocky fields) montane savanna. The exact location of collection was unspecified. The species has been shown to produce phosphatases.

Philcoxia minensis is a small plant with an orbicular leaf shape and tall, stalked inflorescence that reach a height of 17–21 cm (7–8 in). Its leaves possess small glands that are capable of trapping and digesting nematodes, defining it as a carnivorous plant.
