= Sempre Vivas National Park =

National park in Minas Gerais, Brazil

- Parque Nacional das Sempre-Vivas
- IUCN category II (national park)
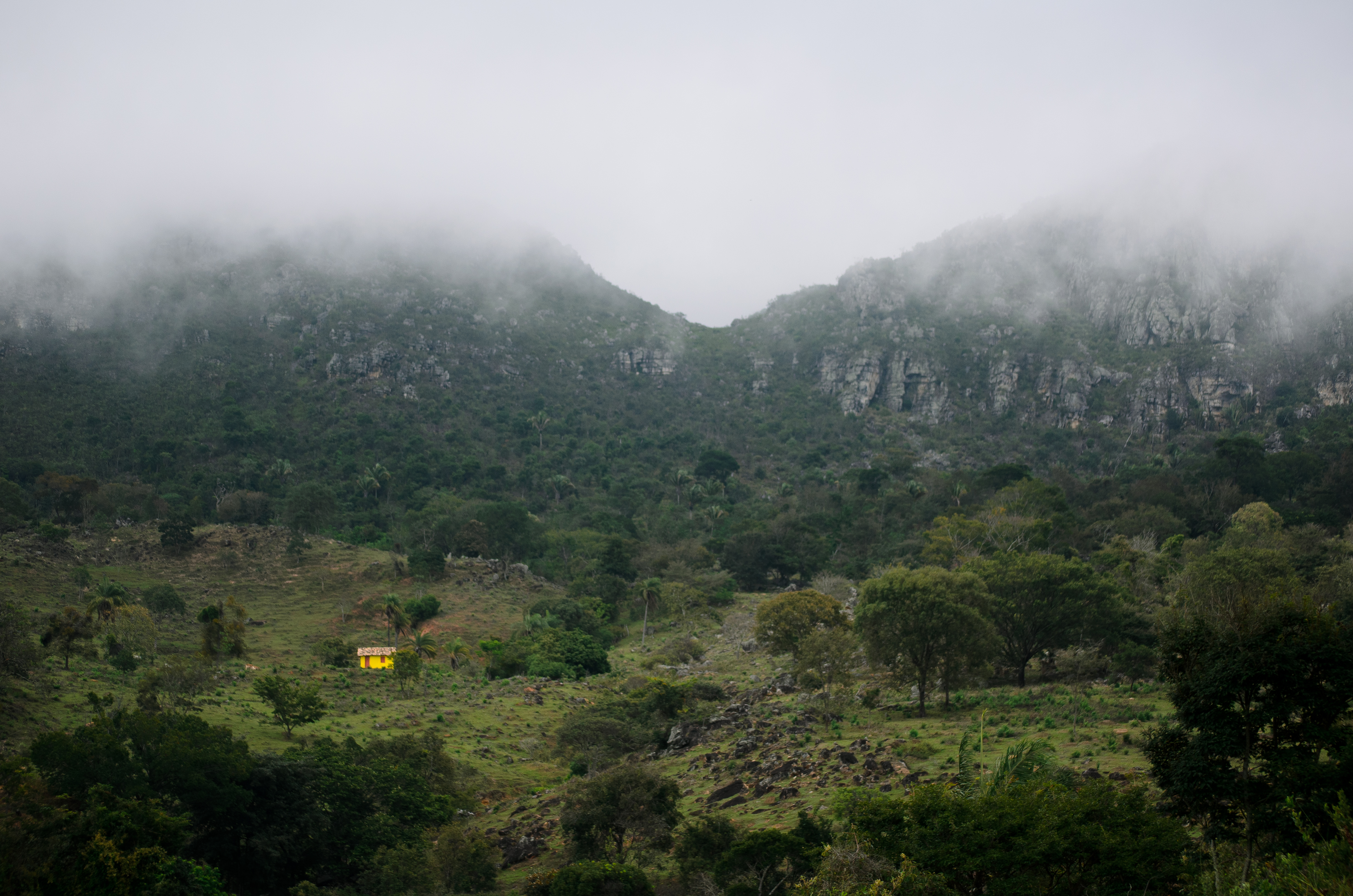
- Yellow house in the park

- Location within Brazil
- Nearest city: Bocaiúva, Minas Gerais
- Coordinates: 17°48′18″S 43°45′50″W
- Area: 124,154 hectares (306,790 acres)
- Designation: National park
- Created: 13 December 2002
- Administrator: ICMBio

Sempre Vivas National Park (Portuguese: Parque Nacional das Sempre-Vivas) is a national park in the state of Minas Gerais, Brazil.

== Location ==
The park is in the Cerrado biome. It covers 124,154 hectares (306,790 acres). It was created on 13 December 2002 and is administered by the Chico Mendes Institute for Biodiversity Conservation. It covers parts of the municipalities of Bocaiúva, Buenópolis, Diamantina and Olhos-d'Água in Minais Gerais. The park became part of the Espinhaço Mosaic of conservation units, created in 2010.

== Environment ==
Altitudes range from 650 to 1,525 metres (2,133 to 5,003 ft). The park is in the Serras do Espinhaço Meridional. It forms part of the watershed between the Jequitinhonha River and São Francisco River, which it feeds from about 600 springs. Average annual rainfall is 1,200 millimetres (47 in). Temperatures range from 5 to 32 °C (41 to 90 °F) with an average of 20 °C (68 °F).

The park has well-preserved examples of varied types of vegetation including cerrado woodland and fields, seasonal semi-deciduous forest, swamp forest, streams, lagoons and riparian vegetation. These support a wide range of plant species. There are four endemic species of amphibians: Bokermannohyla saxicola, Lanceback Treefrog (Scinax curicica), Pseudopaludicola mineira and Thoropa megatympanum. There are two endemic bird species: hyacinth visorbearer (Augastes scutatus) and grey-backed tachuri (Polystictus superciliaris).

== Conservation ==
The park is classified as IUCN protected area category II (national park). It has the objectives of preserving natural ecosystems of great ecological relevance and scenic beauty, enabling scientific research, environmental education, outdoors recreation and eco-tourism. Protected species include the maned wolf (Chrysocyon brachyurus), cougar (Puma concolor), ocelot (Leopardus pardalis), giant anteater (Myrmecophaga tridactyla) and giant armadillo (Priodontes maximus).

== Sources ==
- Parque Nacional das Sempre-Vivas (in Portuguese), Chico Mendes Institute for Biodiversity Conservation, archived from the original on 2017-03-02
- Teixeira, Izabella (26 November 2010), Portaria no- 444, de 26 de Novembro de 2010 (PDF) (in Portuguese), archived from the original (PDF) on 2017-02-02
- Unidade de Conservação: Parque Nacional das Sempre-Vivas (in Portuguese), MMA: Ministério do Meio Ambiente
