= Biribiri State Park =

State park in Minas Gerais, Brazil

- Parque Estadual de Biribiri
- IUCN category II (national park)
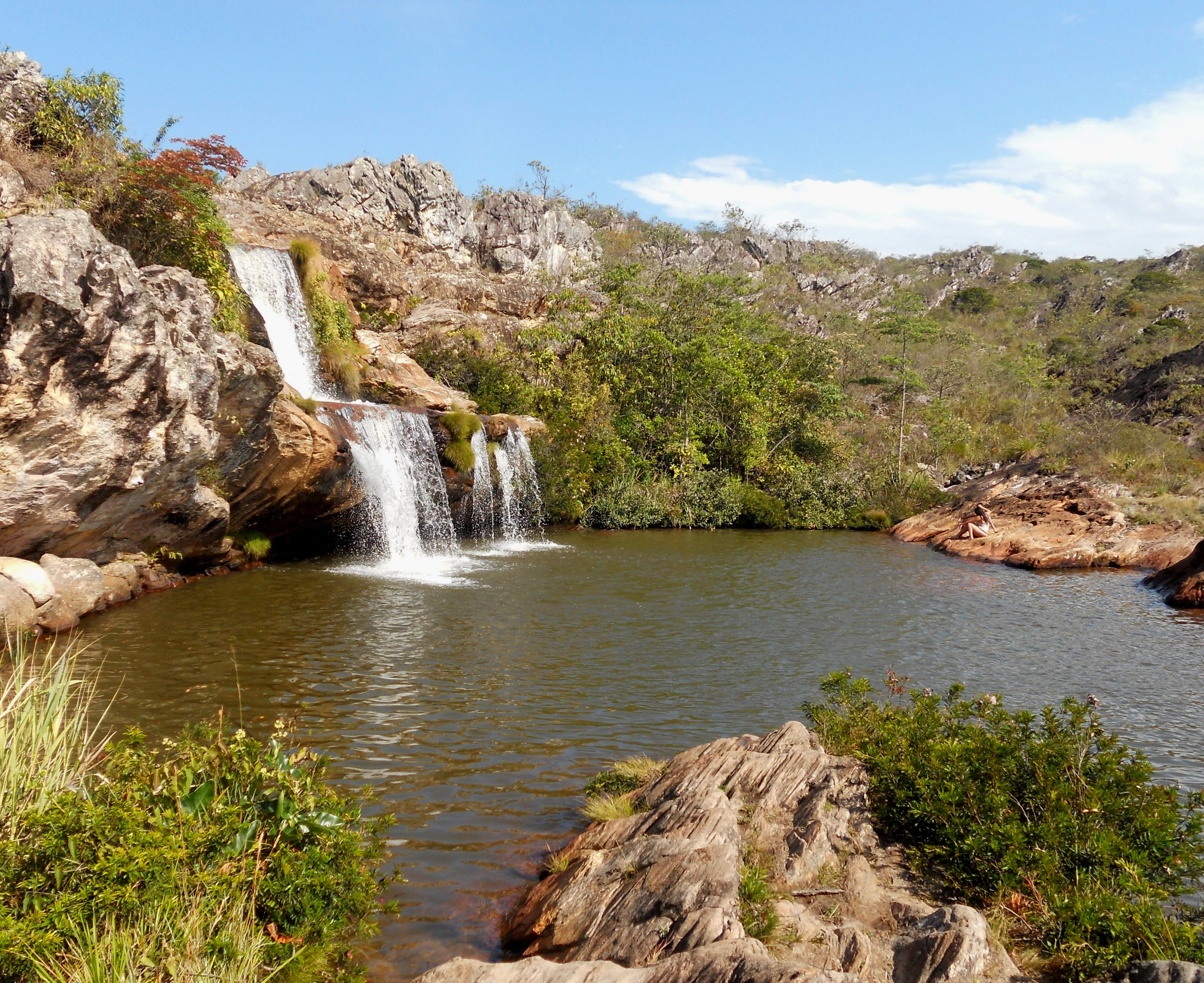
- Cachoeira dos Cristais

- Location within Brazil
- Nearest city: Diamantina, Minas Gerais
- Coordinates: 18.145438°S 43.618942°W
- Area: 16,999 hectares (42,010 acres)
- Designation: State park
- Created: 22 September 1998
- Administrator: Instituto Estadual de Florestas MG

The Biribiri State Park (Portuguese: Parque Estadual de Biribiri) is a state park in the state of Minas Gerais, Brazil. It protects a mountainous region of cerrado. The park contains an abandoned village, once home to workers in a textile factory, which is now a tourist attraction.

== Location ==
The Biribiri State Park is in the municipality of Diamantina, Minas Gerais, 2.5 kilometres (1.6 mi) from the municipal seat and 300 kilometres (190 mi) from the state capital of Belo Horizonte. It has an area of 16,999 hectares (42,010 acres). The park is accessed via a dirt road, but it is maintained well and can be used by cars. The entrance is 13 kilometres (8.1 mi) from the center of Diamantina.

The park is in the Serra do Espinhaço, a range with quartz rocks in the Jequitinhonha River basin. Altitudes range from 720 metres (2,360 ft) in the north to 1,480 metres (4,860 ft) in the south. The park still has traces of gold and diamond exploration. There are archaeological sites with rock inscriptions, but their locations are not marked.

== Environment ==
The climate is tropical, with annual average temperature of about 18 °C (64 °F). The wettest month is December. Vegetation includes cerrado, gallery forest and rocky fields. There are fragments of cerradão in the north, and areas of dense forest on the slopes of streams and rivers. Flora include the Vellozia squamata, Caryocar brasiliense, jacarandá, pau-santo, Campomanesia pubescens, Hancornia speciosa and candeia, as well as many types of evergreens, orchids and bromeliads.

Fauna include maned wolf (Chrysocyon brachyurus), cougar (Puma concolor) and crested caracara (Caracara plancus). Other species include the giant anteater (Myrmecophaga tridactyla), rock cavy (Kerodon rupestris), lesser nothura (Nothura minor), helmeted manakin (Antilophia galeata) and hyacinth visorbearer (Augastes scutatus).

== History ==
The Biribiri State Park was created by decree 39.909 of 22 September 1998. The park is named after the Fazenda Biribiri (Note: "Biri" means "hole" in the Guarani language.), which covered most of its area. It is administered by the State Institute of Forestry (IEF). The objectives are to preserve the area due to its environmental and cultural importance. The park became part of the Espinhaço Mosaic of conservation units, created in 2010.

Infrastructure is minimal. There is one caretaker who works in a shack at the park entrance, and there is a house at one of the highest points used as a lookout at periods of high fire risk. In April 2013, the Public Ministry and Justice department of Minas Gerais charged that the State Forestry Institute had been failing to comply with environmental legislation. There were serious problems such as lack of a management plan, physical structures and personnel, and land tenure issues with the ecological stations of Mata do Acauã and Mata dos Ausentes and the state parks of Biribiri, Alto Cariri, Rio Preto and Serra Negra.

== Attractions ==
The Cachoeira do Sentinela, a waterfall, is about 6 kilometres (3.7 mi) from the entrance. Visitors may bathe in the pool. Further on is the Cachoeira dos Cristais. This waterfall is 12 kilometres (7.5 mi) from the entrance, and may be reached by car. The Caminho dos Escravos (Slave Trail) is a 20 kilometres (12 mi) trail that passes through the interior of the park. Other attractions are the Água Limpa and Estudante pools, and the 4 hour waterfall trail. As of 2016 the park was open every day including holidays, and admission was free. Visitors may use bicycles on the trails that lead to the waterfalls. The months from May to July are cold, and suitable for hiking.

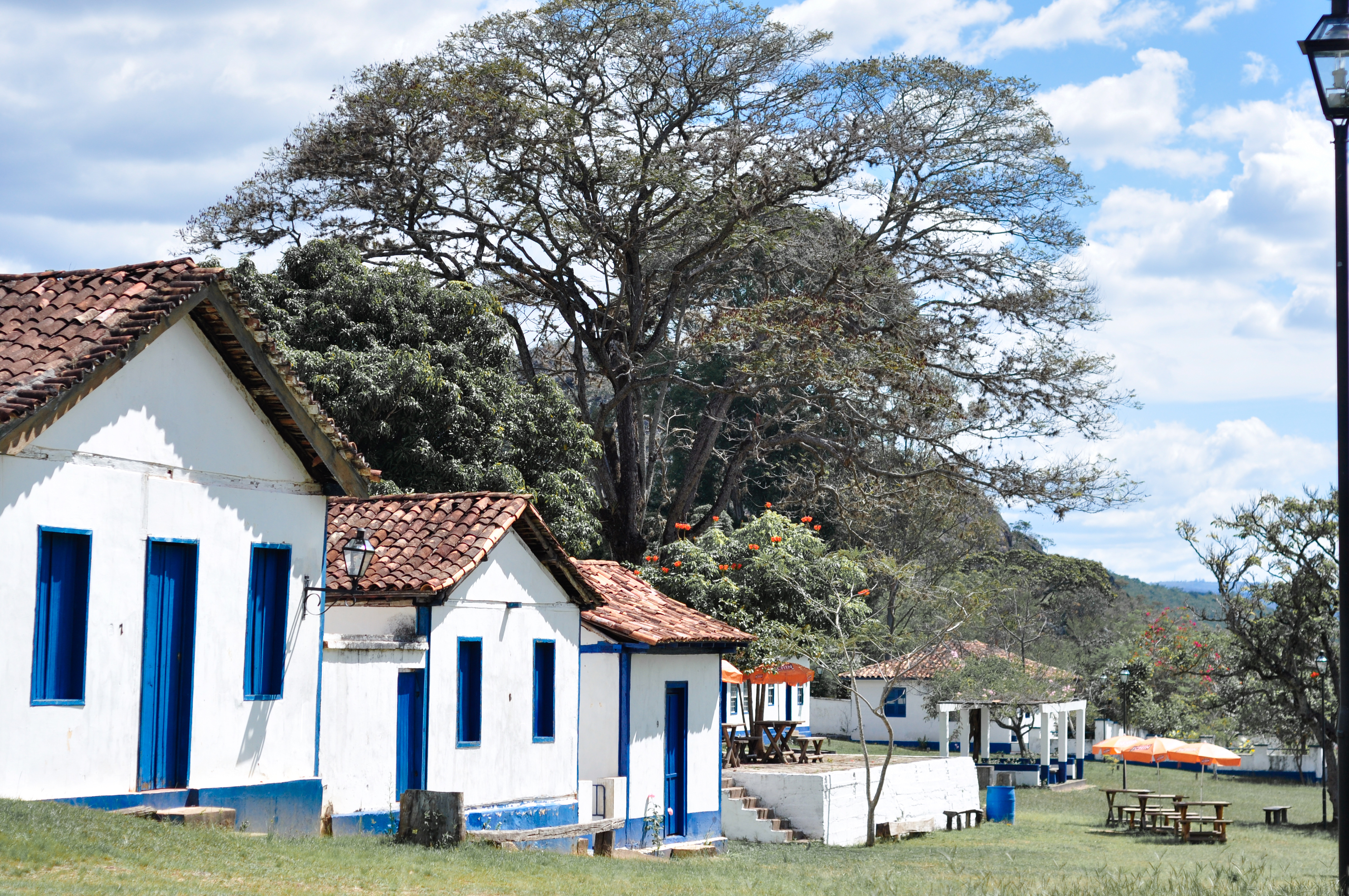
The historical village of Biribiri

== Vila de Biribiri ==
The Estamparia SA, a textile factory, was created in the interior of what is now the park in 1876 by the Bishop of Diamantina, João Antônio dos Santos. This was one of the first and most important textile factories in the state. The workers lived in a small town in the center of a valley, which held a warehouse, school and church. The church bell was made in the factory, and the clock was donated by the Portuguese royal family. The Biribiri River, which runs through the park, powered the hydroelectric turbines that delivered electricity to the factory and the village. The factory had 1,200 workers. It closed in 1976, and the village was emptied. The village is still owned by Estamparia SA, and tourists can rent the houses. There are two restaurants in the village.
