= Espinhaço Mosaic =

Espinhaço: Alto Jequitinhonha – Serra do Cabral Mosaic
- Mosaico do Espinhaço
- IUCN category V (protected landscape/seascape)
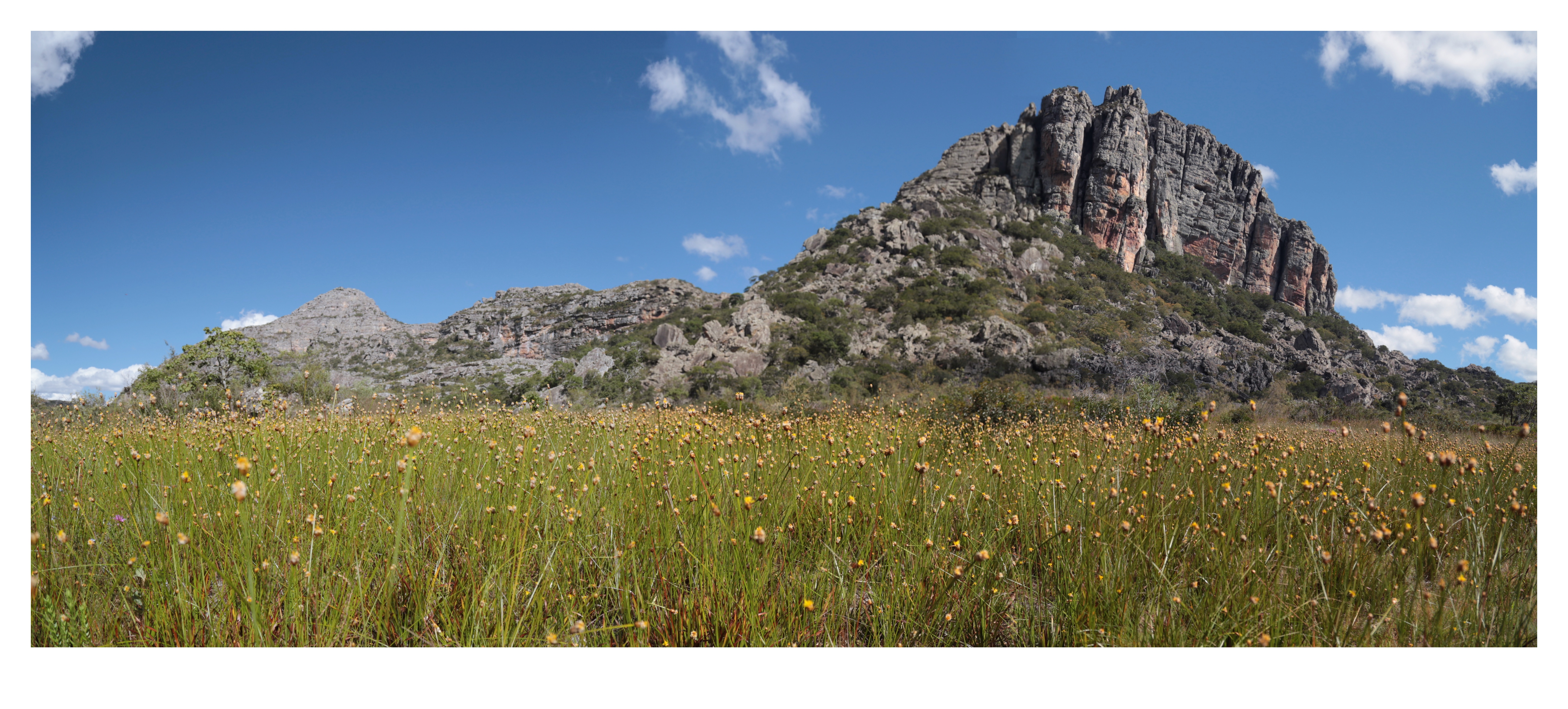
- Field of flowers below Serra do Galho

- Location within Brazil
- Nearest city: Diamantina, Minas Gerais
- Coordinates: 18°10′30″S 43°20′08″W
- Area: 910,000 ha (3,500 sq mi)
- Designation: Protected area mosaic
- Created: 26 November 2010
- Administrator: Instituto Chico Mendes de Conservação da Biodiversidade

The Espinhaço: Alto Jequitinhonha – Serra do Cabral Mosaic (Portuguese: Mosaico do Espinhaço: Alto Jequitinhonha - Serra do Cabral), or simply Espinhaço Mosaic, is a protected area mosaic in the state of Minas Gerais, Brazil.

== Background ==
The Espinhaço Mountains extend for about 1,200 kilometres (750 mi) from the iron quadrilateral in the south-central region of Minas Gerais north to the Chapada Diamantina in Bahia. The mountains lie between the cerrado biome to the west, Atlantic Forest to the east and caatinga to the north. In the higher regions there are rocky fields, an ecosystem with considerable biodiversity. In 2005 UNESCO recognized a large portion of the Espinhaço Chain in Minas Gerais as a Biosphere Reserve.

Discussions followed on how to better conserve the ecosystems, and the first proposals for a Mosaic of Units of Conservation of the Espinhaço: Alto Jequitinhonha - Serra do Cabral were made at the end of 2007. Official activities began in April 2008, coordinated by the Biotropics Institute, a scientific and conservationist NGO, in partnership with the Minas Gerais State Forest Institute (IEF) and with the support of Conservation International Brasil and the Chico Mendes Institute for Biodiversity Conservation (ICMBio).

The relevant area was defined as 910,000 hectares (2,200,000 acres) of the upper portion of the Jequitinhonha and Serra do Cabral valley, including conservation units and their buffer zones. It included seven fully protected units and five environmental protection areas in 14 municipalities: Itamarandiba, Senador Modestino Gonçalves, São Gonçalo do Rio Preto, Felício dos Santos, Rio Vermelho, Couto de Magalhães de Minas, Santo Antônio do Itambé, Serra Azul de Minas, Serro, Diamantina, Buenópolis, Joaquim Felício, Bocaiúva and Olhos-d'Água.

== Organization ==
The Espinhaço Mosaic in the state of Minas Gerais was recognized by ordinance 444 of 26 November 2010, which also created the managing council. The council includes representatives of public bodies and civil society organizations. It is administered by the ICMBio. As an integrated management tool for a set of conservation units that overlap or are near each other, the mosaic expands conservation actions beyond the scope of the individual units.

== Component units ==
The mosaic was created with the following conservation units:

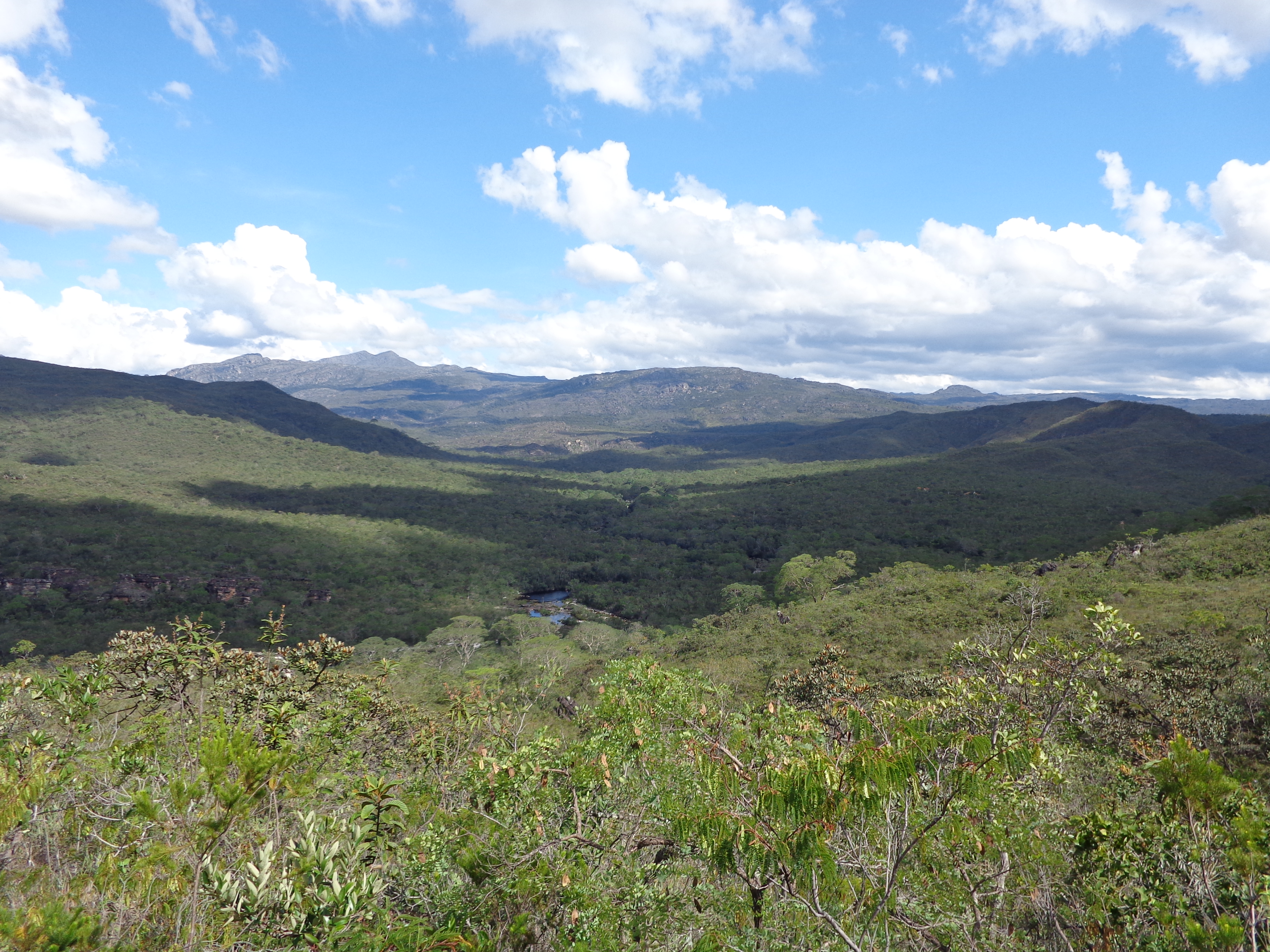
Rio Preto State Park

Unit	Level	Created	Area (ha)
Água das Vertentes Environmental Protection Area	State	1998	76,310
Biribiri State Park	State	1998	16,999
Felício Environmental Protection Area	Municipal		11,476
Mata dos Ausentes Ecological Station	State	1974	498
Pico do Itambé State Park	State	1998	4,696
Rio Manso Environmental Protection Area	Municipal	1998	7,331
Rio Preto State Park	State	1994	10,750
Sempre Vivas National Park	Federal	2002	124,154
Serra Negra State Park	State	1998	13,654
Serra do Cabral State Park	State	2005	22,494

== Sources ==
- Azevedo, Alexsander Araújo; Goulart, Maíra Figueiredo; Silva, Joaquim de Araújo; Vilhena, Cecília Fernandes de (2009), Mosaico de Unidades de Conservação do Espinhaço: Alto Jequitinhonha – Serra do Cabral. Processo de criação e implantação (PDF) (in Portuguese), Instituto Biotrópicos, archived from the original (PDF) on 2017-02-02
- MOS do Espinhaço: Alto Jequitinhonha - Serra do Cabral (in Portuguese), ISA: Instituto Socioambiental
- Teixeira, Izabella (26 November 2010), Portaria no- 444, de 26 de Novembro de 2010 (PDF) (in Portuguese), archived from the original (PDF) on 2017-02-02
