= Philcoxia bahiensis =

Scientific classification
- Kingdom: Plantae
- Clade: Tracheophytes
- Clade: Angiosperms
- Clade: Eudicots
- Clade: Asterids
- Order: Lamiales
- Family: Plantaginaceae
- Genus: Philcoxia
- Species: P. bahiensis

Binomial name
- Philcoxia bahiensis V.C.Souza & Harley

Species of flowering plant

Philcoxia bahiensis is a rare plant species in the Plantaginaceae that is endemic to the Brazilian state of Bahia. It was first discovered collected by a local resident, Wilson Ganev, in August 1992 from the Serra do Atalho in the Piatã municipality. That collection was sent to Kew Gardens for naming. Because of its placentation, the specimen was determined to be a member of the Scrophulariaceae (later Plantaginaceae sensu APG II) despite its appearance close to that of terrestrial Utricularia. Material of this specimen had been sent to Vinícius Souza, who was working on the Scrophulariaceae of Brazil. It was then formally described in 2000 as a new species.

Its habitat consists of deep white sand in the midst of cerrado vegetation at an elevation between 800 and 1450 m. Initial descriptions of the genus included suspicions that the plethora of stalked capitate glands on the upper surfaces of leaves was an indication that these species may be carnivorous.
