= Pseudopaludicola mineira =

Conservation status
- Least Concern (IUCN 3.1)

Scientific classification
- Kingdom: Animalia
- Phylum: Chordata
- Class: Amphibia
- Order: Anura
- Family: Leptodactylidae
- Genus: Pseudopaludicola
- Species: P. mineira

Binomial name
- Pseudopaludicola mineira Lobo, 1994

Species of frog

The Minas swamp froglet (Pseudopaludicola mineira) is a species of frog in the family Leptodactylidae. It is endemic to Brazil.

== Habitat ==
This frog is known from Cerrado savanna and shrubland, within which it is found in humid areas, such as marshes, temporary and permanent pools, and groundwater seepages. It has shown a strong tolerance to anthropogenic disturbance and is also found in cattle pastre and watering holes. Scientists have seen it between 800 and 1,600 m (2,600 and 5,200 ft) above sea level.

Scientists have reported these frogs from Serra do Cipó National Park and suspect it in Parque Estadual do Rio Preto and Parque Nacional das Sempre-Vivas.

== Reproduction ==
The female frog deposits eggs in still water, where the free-living tadpoles develop.

== Threats ==
The IUCN classifies this species as least concern of extinction. Because much of its range is at high elevation, much of the population is not subject to human disturbance. At lower elevations, there is some livestock ranching, but the frog is relatively tolerant.
