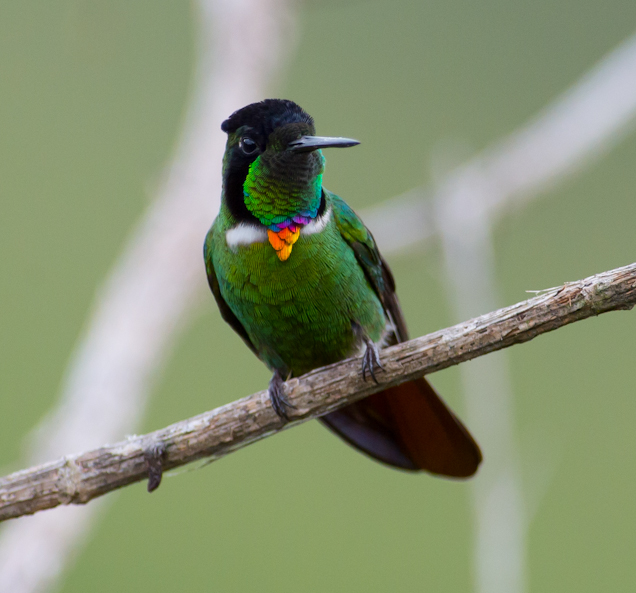
- Male
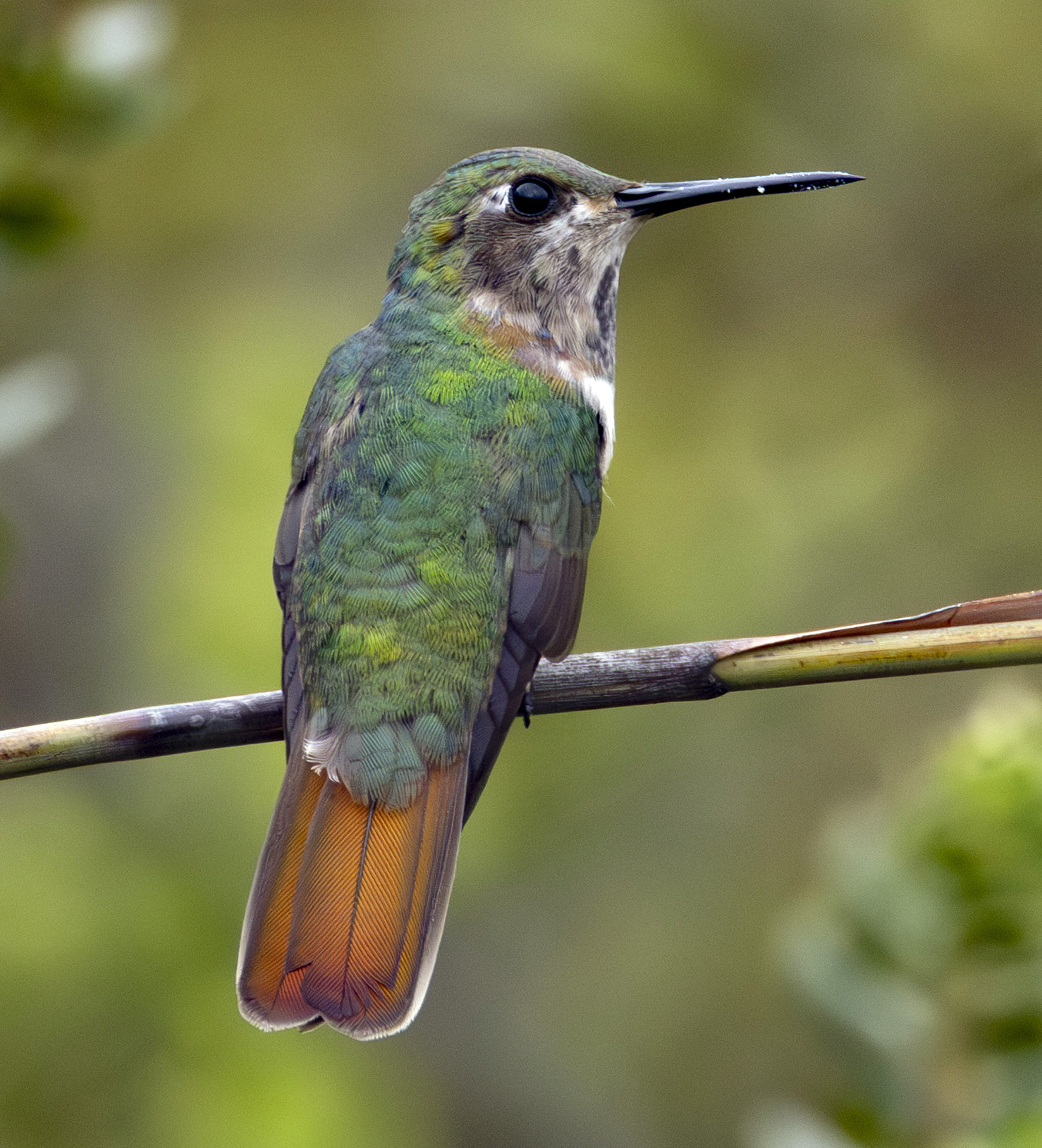
- Female

Conservation status
- Near Threatened (IUCN 3.1)
- CITES Appendix II

Scientific classification
- Kingdom: Animalia
- Phylum: Chordata
- Class: Aves
- Order: Apodiformes
- Family: Trochilidae
- Genus: Augastes
- Species: A. lumachella

Binomial name
- Augastes lumachella (Lesson, 1839)

Synonyms
- Ornismya lumachella Lesson 1838; Amazilis lumachellus Lesson, 1843; Augastes lumachellus [orth. error]

= Hooded visorbearer =

Species of bird in Brazil

The hooded visorbearer (Augastes lumachella) is a small species of hummingbird in the family Trochilidae. Endemic to the east Brazilian state of Bahia, it is found only at higher altitudes in the Chapada Diamantina region. The species is sexually dimorphic. It resides in the campo rupestre, an arid, high-elevation area characterized by rocky outcrops, poor soils, open habitats, and harsh climatic conditions. There, it feeds primarily on nectar, though it also takes insects. Its breeding ecology remains largely undescribed, though it is known to build its nest from cactus spines. The International Union for Conservation of Nature rates it as a near-threatened species, primarily because of the relatively small size of its range. It is threatened by habitat loss, brought about primarily by unregulated mining and the conversion of the campo to pastureland and human habitation. Climate change is projected to cause a major contraction of its range – perhaps by as much as 90%.

== Taxonomy and systematics ==
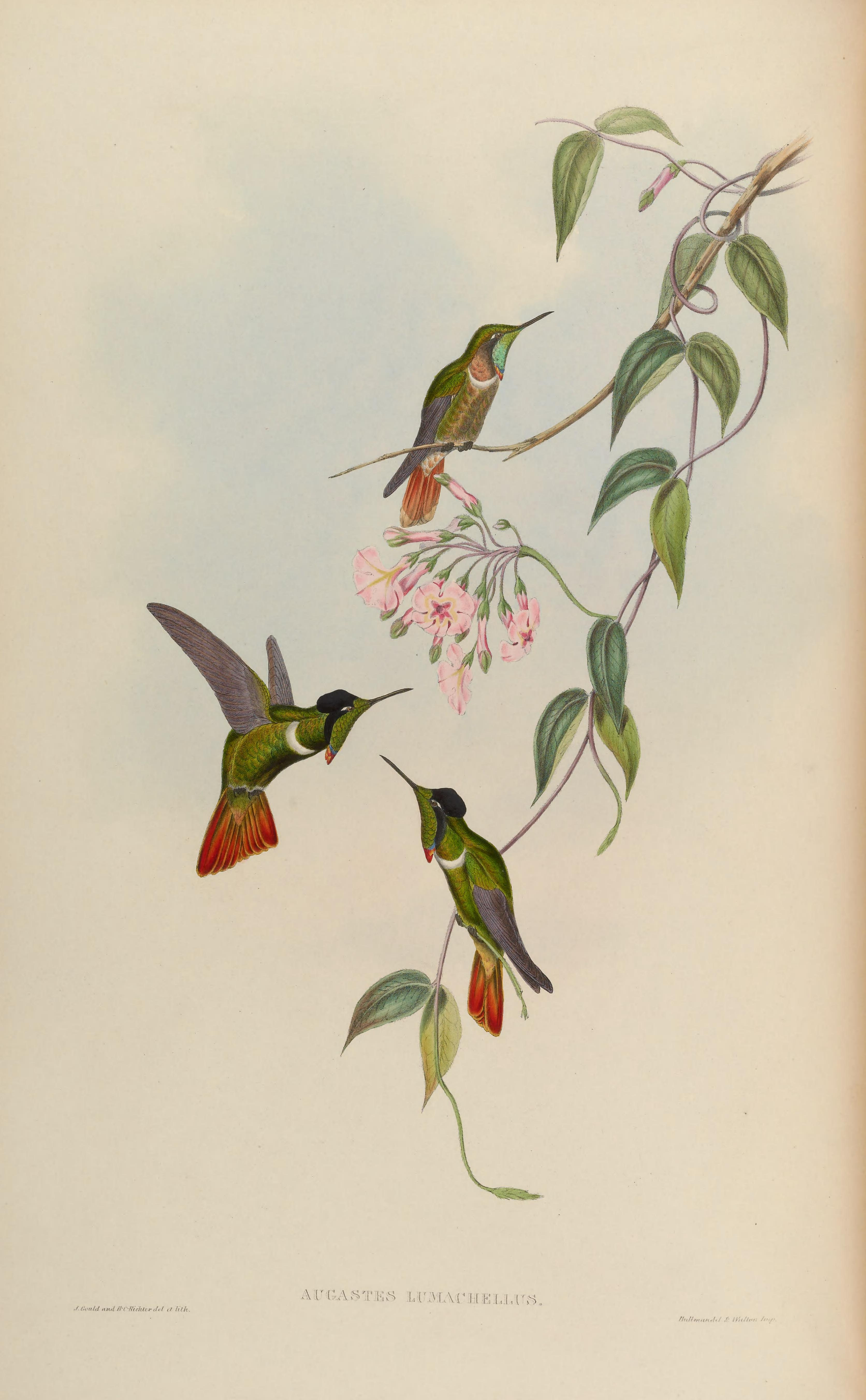
Hooded visorbearer (lithography by Henry Constantine Richter (1821–1902) based on a drawing by John Gould (1804–1881))

Rene Primevere Lesson first described the hooded visorbearer for science in 1838, using a specimen collected in Bahia, Brazil. He named it Ornismya lumachella. Five years later, Lesson moved it and four other species to his newly created genus Amazilis. John Gould moved it again in 1849, when he created the genus Augastes for this species and the hyacinth visorbearer, another east Brazilian endemic. There are no subspecies. DNA studies have shown that the two Augastes hummingbirds are sister species, and that the genus is most closely related to Geoffroy's daggerbill.

The genus name Augastes comes directly from the Ancient Greek augastes, meaning "radiant" or "light-giver". The species name lumachella is an Italian word for fire marble – a dark limestone that contains fossilised shells; it is a diminutive of the word for snail (lumacha). Although the species name is sometimes written as lumachellus rather than lumachella, this is incorrect; because it is an Italian word (rather than a Latinized one), it is considered to be invariable.

== Description ==
The hooded visorbearer is a small hummingbird, measuring 8.3–10 cm (3.3–3.9 in) in length and weighing 4–4.8 g (0.14–0.17 oz). Its short, straight bill is black. The species is moderately sexually dimorphic. The male is an iridescent bronzy-green color on the upperparts and underparts. His forehead and throat are an iridescent golden-green with a narrow border of bluish-green at the lower edge of the throat. The sides and crown of his head are black, and a thin line of black borders his gorget. He has a narrow white breast band with a golden-orange spot in the center and purplish-brown wings. His tail is a deep bronzy-crimson. The female's coloring is more subdued. She is more bronzy on her upperparts and underparts, and her head is green instead of black. She has a gray face and the sides of her head are brown, rather than black. The green on her throat is less colorful and iridescent than that of the male's, with a stronger border of bluish-green at the lower edge; the color does not extend to her forehead. Immature birds are bronzy-green above and brown below, with a white throat speckled with green. Their tails are a coppery-bronze above and crimson below, less brilliantly-colored than those of adults. The combination of head pattern and tail color is said to make this species "unmistakable" within its small natural range.

=== Voice ===
The song of the hooded visorbearer is described as "nasal" and "dry". Transcribed as tru tweé tru zee, its short phrases are typically repeated more than three times in a row.

== Range and habitat ==
The hooded visorbearer is endemic to eastern Brazil. Found only in the Chapada Diamantina region of Bahia, it is restricted to campo rupestre, a high-elevation ecoregion that is characterized by poor soils, open vegetation, rocky outcrops and harsh climatic conditions. Its occurs at elevations ranging from 900 to 2,000 m (3,000 to 6,600 ft), and is considered to be one of South America's obligate grassland birds. It is found in rocky, semi-arid areas with cactus and low shrubs on the summits of mountains and mesas.

== Behavior ==
=== Feeding ===
Like all hummingbirds, the hooded visorbearer feeds primarily on nectar, though it will also take insects. It typically forages low, often less than 1 m (3 ft 3 in) from the ground. It is known to visit Vriesea flowers early in the day, while the flowers (which are primarily bat-pollinated) still hold some residual nectar.

=== Breeding ===
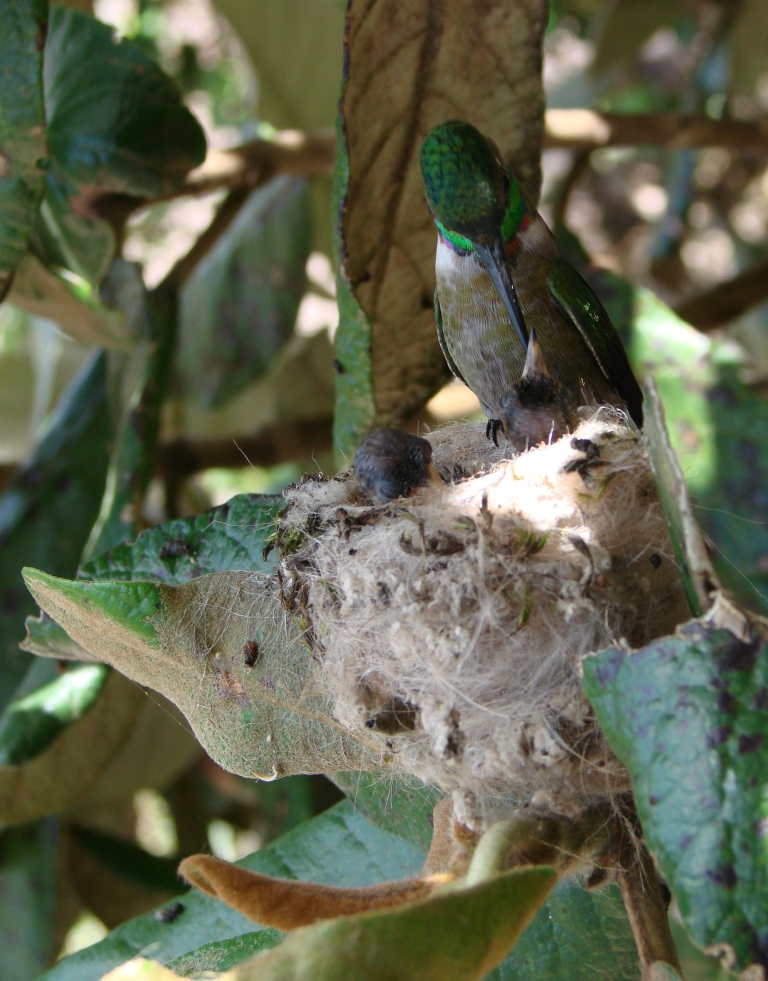
Nesting

Little is known of the breeding ecology of the hooded visorbearer. It builds its nest from cactus spines, usually about a metre (just over three feet) off the ground.

== Conservation and threats ==
For several decades in the 20th century, the species was thought to have gone extinct. Then, in 1961, Brazilian naturalist Augusto Ruschi led an expedition to an area where they had been collected in the past, and rediscovered them. The International Union for Conservation of Nature now rates the hooded visorbearer as a near-threatened species, based primarily on its relatively small range. The decline of suitable habitat in both size and quality is ongoing, primarily as a result of uncontrolled fires and climate change. Projections suggest that the visorbearer's range may shrink by as much as 90% by 2060 due to the effects of climage change. The mining of gold, diamonds, quartz and manganese within its range detrimentally affects habitat, as does the conversion of natural areas to animal pasturage and human habitation. Although its population has not been quantified, its numbers are thought to be declining.

== Relationship with humans ==
The hooded visorbearer is considered to be among the handful of birds in the Chapada Diamantina that prove particularly attractive to birdwatchers. Trails have been created in the Chapada Diamantina National Park to enable ecotourists to enter the habitat in which they are found.
