= Philcoxia goiasensis =

Scientific classification
- Kingdom: Plantae
- Clade: Tracheophytes
- Clade: Angiosperms
- Clade: Eudicots
- Clade: Asterids
- Order: Lamiales
- Family: Plantaginaceae
- Genus: Philcoxia
- Species: P. goiasensis

Binomial name
- Philcoxia goiasensis P.Taylor

Species of flowering plant

Philcoxia goiasensis is a rare annual herb in the family Plantaginaceae, and is endemic to the Rio da Prata area of Posse, Goiás, in Brazil.

It was discovered on 5 April 1966 by H. S. Irwin, J. Russell, J. W. Grear Jr, R. Souza and R. Reisdos Santos at 800 metres (2,600 ft) altitude in the Serra Geral de Goiás, part of the cerrado, in an open, sandy area. Unlike the other three species in the genus, P. goiasensis is smaller. Its leaf blades or laminae are peltate and only 2 mm in diameter.
