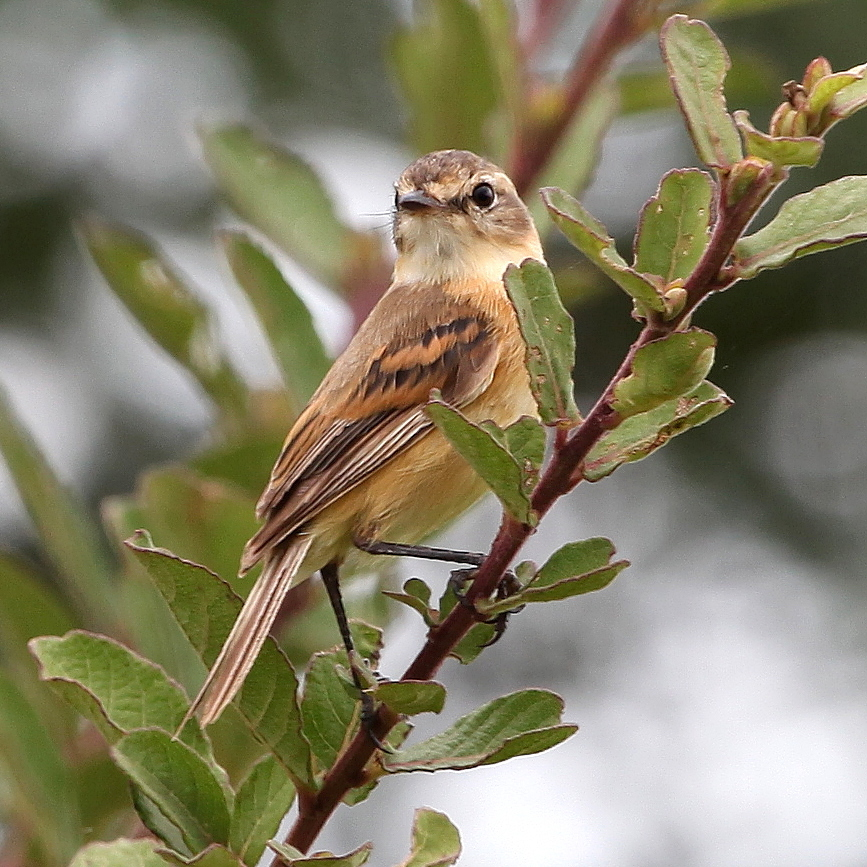
- Female at Bonito, Mato Grosso do Sul, Brazil

Conservation status
- Near Threatened (IUCN 3.1)

Scientific classification
- Kingdom: Animalia
- Phylum: Chordata
- Class: Aves
- Order: Passeriformes
- Family: Tyrannidae
- Genus: Polystictus
- Species: P. pectoralis

Binomial name
- Polystictus pectoralis (Vieillot, 1817)

= Bearded tachuri =

Species of bird

The bearded tachuri (Polystictus pectoralis) is a Near Threatened species of bird in subfamily Elaeniinae of family Tyrannidae, the tyrant flycatchers. It is found in every mainland South American country except Chile, Ecuador, and Peru.

== Taxonomy and systematics ==
The bearded tachuri shares genus Polystictus with the grey-backed tachuri (P. superciliaris) but several authors have described the relationship as weak and needing confirmation.

As of late 2024, the bearded tachuri is assigned these three subspecies:

- Polystictus pectoralis bogotensis (Chapman, 1915)
- Polystictus pectoralis brevipennis (Berlepsch & Hartert, EJO, 1902)
- Polystictus pectoralis pectoralis (Vieillot, 1817)

The two subspecies other than the nominate P. p. pectoralis have been suggested as individual species. P. p. bogotensis is believed extinct.

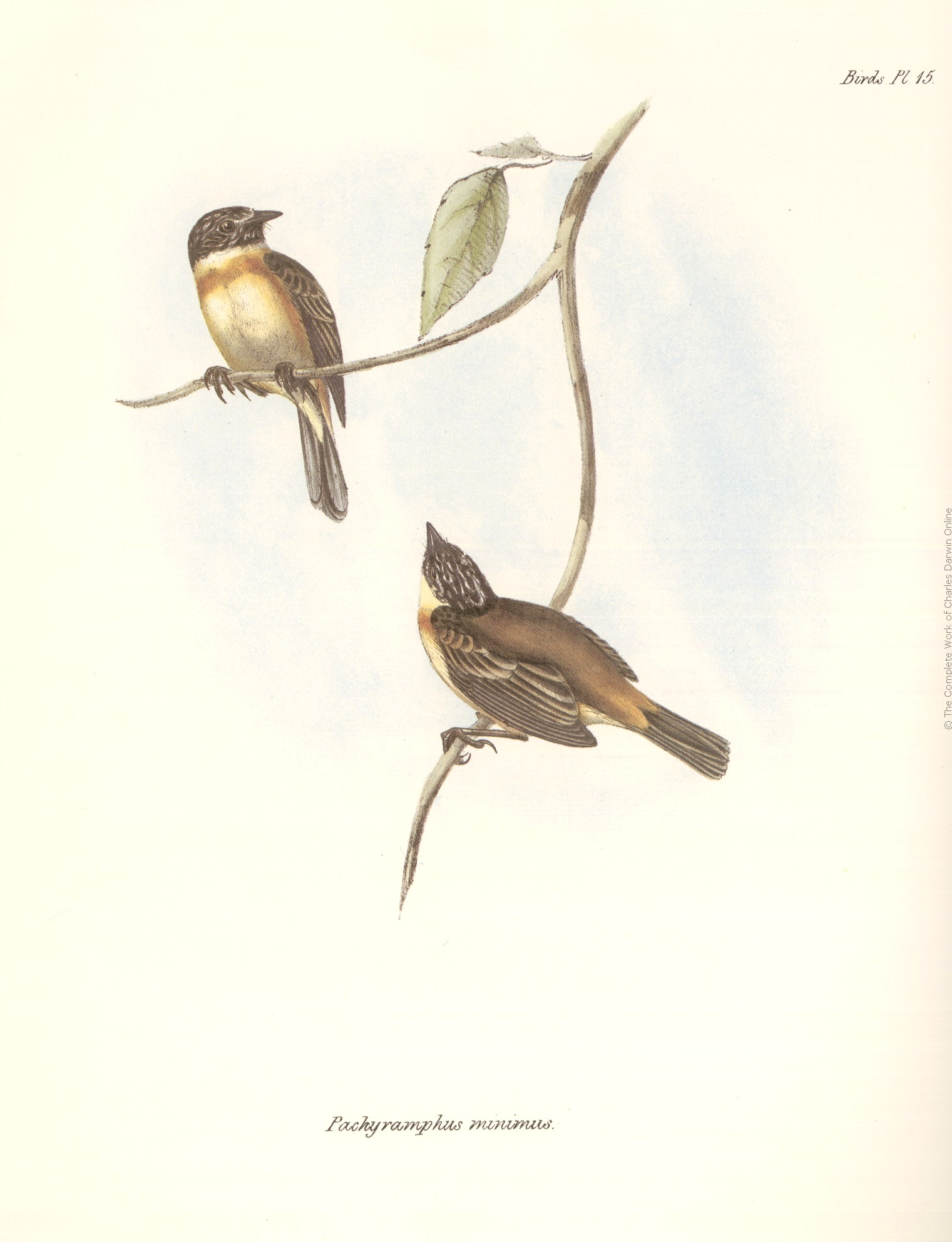
Polystictus pectoralis Gould, 1839

== Description ==
The bearded tachuri is 8 to 10.5 cm (3.1 to 4.1 in) long and weighs 6 to 8 grams (0.21 to 0.28 oz). Adult males of the nominate subspecies have a dusky gray to blackish crown with a bushy but usually flattened crest; the crown's white center is mostly hidden. They have a short white supercilium and a thin blackish line through the eye on a face that is otherwise thinly striped with black and white. Their upperparts are mostly buffy brown with a tawny to rufous rump. Their wings are dusky with bright cinnamon-buff edges on the flight feathers and tips on the wing coverts; the last show as two wing bars. Their tail is dusky. Their chin ("beard") has thin black and white stripes. Their throat and underparts are pale yellowish white with a cinnamon wash on the breast and flanks. Adult females are duller overall than males. They do not have the male's "beard". Their crown and face are mostly brown and their throat is whitish. Juveniles have reddish edges on their flight feathers, buffy wing bars, and deeper yellow underparts than adults. Subspecies P. p. brevipennis is significantly smaller than the nominate; its crest is smaller and males have less black on their face and throat. P. p. bogotensis is quite different from the other two subspecies. Compared to them its crest is thinner and longer, its crown has less white, its supercilium is bright buff, its face ochraceous tawny, its back more tawny, the edges of its flight feathers and wing coverts deeper tawny, its throat nearly all white, and its flanks a deeper and richer tawny. Both sexes of all subspecies have a fuscous brown iris, a black bill, and black legs and feet.

== Distribution and habitat ==
The bearded tachuri has a highly disjunct distribution. The nominate subspecies has the largest range. It is found in eastern Bolivia, much of Paraguay, western Uruguay, northern Argentina south to Mendoza, La Pampa and Buenos Aires provinces, and southern Brazil in an area roughly bounded by Mato Grosso, southern Minas Gerais, and Mato Grosso do Sul. Subspecies P. p. brevipennis is found from eastern Colombia into western Venezuela, in several area in central and southeastern Venezuela, and separately in each of the Guianas and portions of northern Brazil. P. p. bogotensis is (or was) found very locally in Colombia's Cundinamarca and Valle del Cauca departments. The bearded tachuri is primarily a grassland species. It occurs in savanna with scattered shrubs and scrub, tall grassy areas in cerrado, Venezuela's Gran Sabana, and campos rupestres in Brazil. In elevation it mostly occurs below 1,300 m (4,300 ft) but P. p. bogotensis reaches 2,600 m (8,500 ft).

== Behavior ==
=== Movement ===
The bearded tachuri is mostly resident. However, the southernmost population may move north for the austral winter, as the species is known in Bolivia and adjacent Brazil only in that season. In other areas it may wander to find suitable habitat.

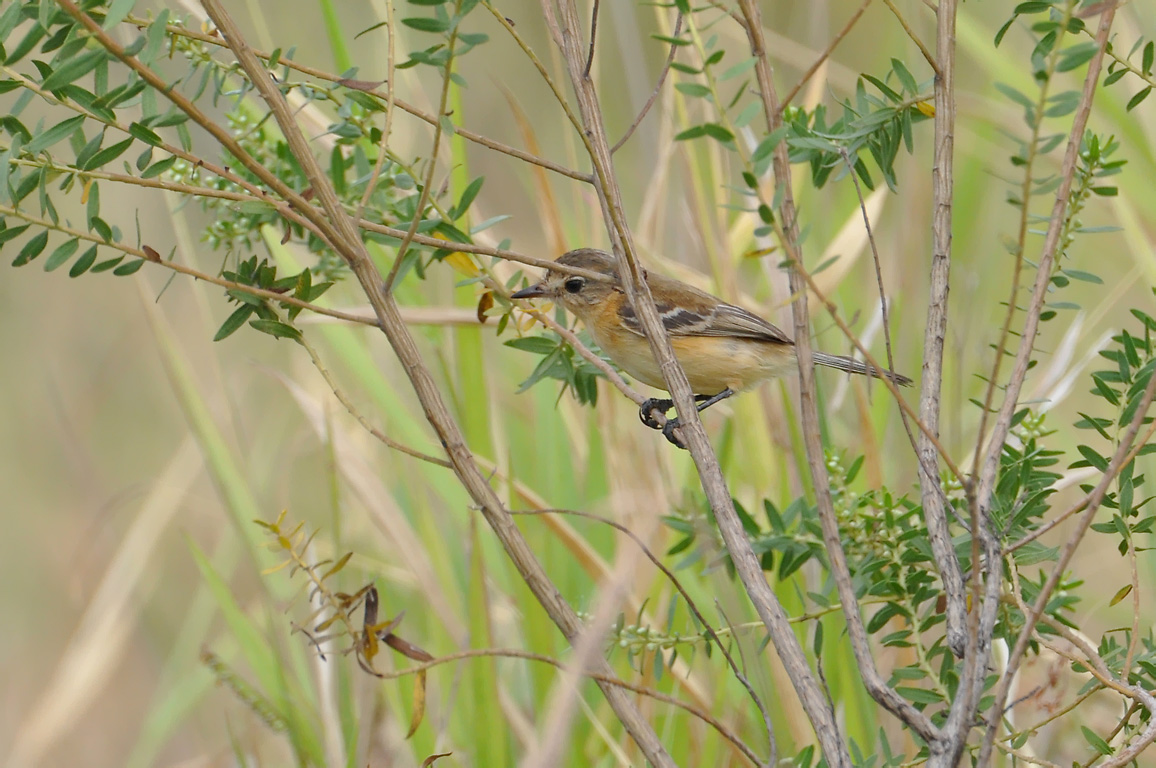
P. p. pectoralis

=== Feeding ===
The bearded tachuri feeds mostly on insects. It usually forages singly, sometimes in pairs, and occasionally joins mixed-species feeding flocks. It perches high in grass or a shrub, gleaning from the perch and making short flights just above the vegetation to hover-glean or move to another perch.

=== Breeding ===
The bearded tachuri's breeding season varies geographically. It includes June and July in eastern Colombia and from September to January in Argentina and most of Brazil. The species is thought to be polygynous. Males make a flight display with song and wing-buzzing. Its nest is an open cup made from grass and other plant fibers, thistle down, and spider web. It is typically place in a shrub within about 1 m (3 ft) of the ground. The clutch size is three eggs. The incubation period, time to fledging, and details of parental care are not known.

=== Vocalization ===
The bearded tachuri sings both from a perch and during its flight display, a "very high, thin series of about 3 'see sisi' notes, ending in an odd, low, toneless, very short 'krrak', together as 'see sisi-krrak' ". It also makes "weak rising 'feee' or 'pewee' " contact calls.

== Status ==
The IUCN has originally in 1988 assessed the bearded tachuri as Threatened and since 2004 as Near Threatened. Its population size is not known and is believed to be decreasing. Subspecies P. p. bogotensis has no confirmed records since the 1950s and is probably extinct. The other subspecies are "generally scarce and localized...Conversion to agriculture for Eucalyptus plantations, arable agriculture (largely soybeans, maize and rice) and pastures have had a severe impact on its habitat in Brazil...The species's strict habitat requirements render it vulnerable to habitat degradation through overgrazing and fire. Conversion of land to oil palm plantations could pose a future threat." It occurs in at least one protected area in most of the countries it inhabits.
