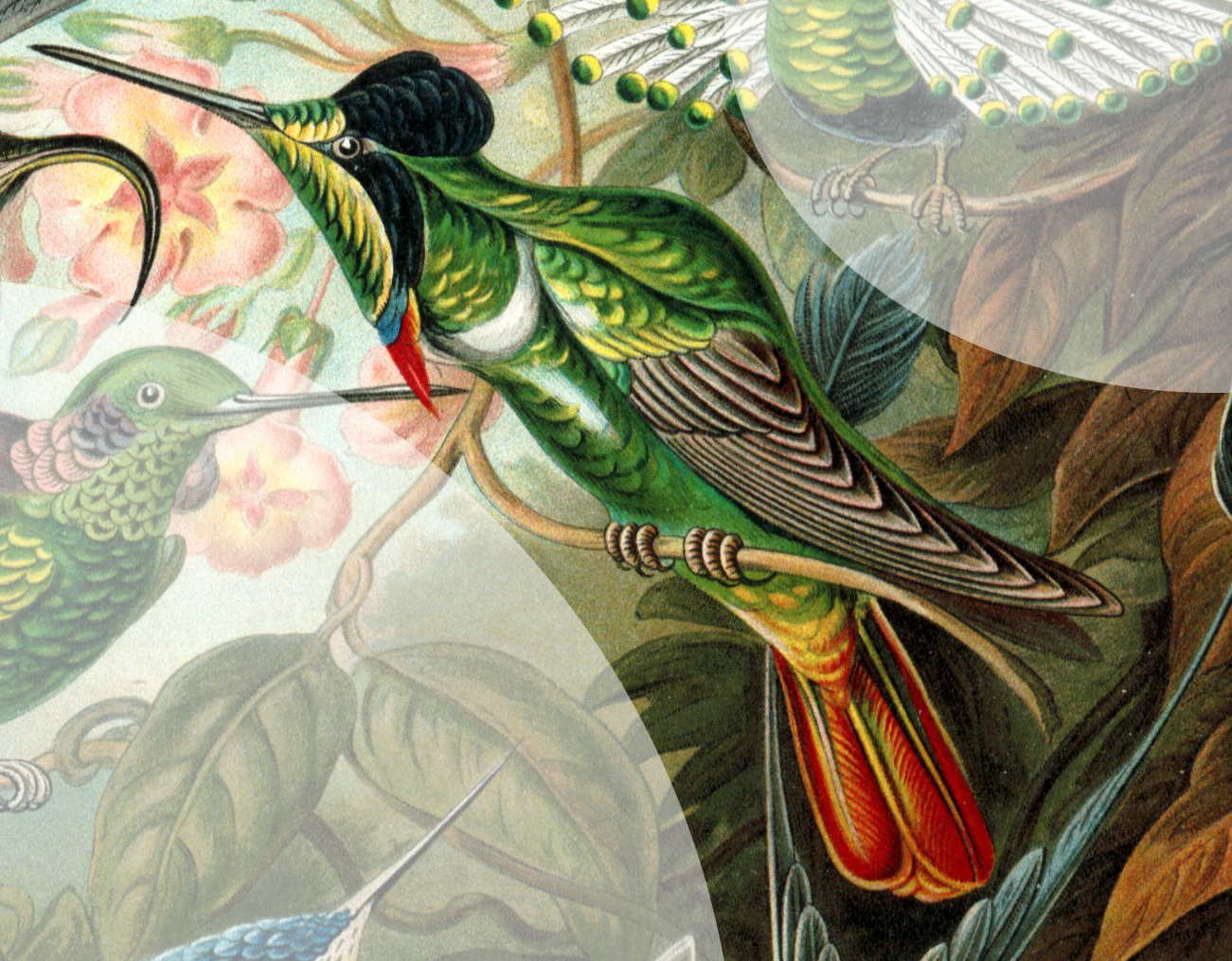
- Augastes lumachella

Scientific classification
- Kingdom: Animalia
- Phylum: Chordata
- Class: Aves
- Order: Apodiformes
- Family: Trochilidae
- Subfamily: Polytminae
- Genus: Augastes; Gould, 1849

Type species
- Trochilus superbus Vieillot, 1822

Species
- 2, see text

= Visorbearer =

Genus of birds

The visorbearers are hummingbirds in the bitypic genus Augastes in the family Trochilidae.

== Species ==
The genus contains the following species:

Genus Augastes – Gould, 1849 – two species
Common name	Scientific name and subspecies	Range	Size and ecology	IUCN status and estimated population
Hooded visorbearer	Augastes lumachella (Lesson, 1839)	Brazil	Size: Habitat: Diet:	LC
Hyacinth visorbearer	Augastes scutatus (Temminck, 1824) Three subspecies: A. s. scutatus; A. s. ilseae; A. s. soaresi	Brazil	Size: Habitat: Diet:	LC
