= Acauã Ecological Station =

Ecological station in Brazil

- Estação Ecológica Acauã
- IUCN category Ia (strict nature reserve)
- Location within Brazil
- Nearest city: Turmalina, Minas Gerais
- Coordinates: 17.146°S 42.755°W
- Area: 3,195 hectares (7,900 acres)
- Designation: Ecological station (Brazil)
- Created: 23 September 1974
- Administrator: Instituto Estadual de Florestas - Minas Gerais

Acauã Ecological Station (Portuguese: Estação Ecológica Acauã is a state-operated ecological station in the State of Minas Gerais, Brazil. It is a strictly protected area and is closed to the public except for research and environmental education.

== Location ==
The reserve is in the cerrado biome, and covers 5,196 hectares (12,840 acres) in the municipalities of Leme do Prado and Turmalina. It was created on 23 September 1974, modified on 27 September 1994 and 30 December 1994. It is in the Jequitinhonha Valley region in Minas Gerais.

== Environment ==
The vegetation is dense cerrado with transition to Atlantic Forest. The flora consists of medium to large plants. Fauna include armadillo, maned wolf, common agouti, paca, collared peccary (Pecari tajacu), robust capuchin monkey and broad-snouted caiman (Caiman latirostris). More than 190 species of birds have been identified.

In April 2013, the Public Ministry and Justice department of Minas Gerais charged that the State Forestry Institute had been failing to comply with environmental legislation. There were serious problems such as lack of a management plan, physical structures and personnel, and land tenure issues with the ecological stations of Mata do Acauã and Mata dos Ausentes and the state parks of Biribiri, Alto Cariri, Rio Preto and Serra Negra.

== Sources ==
- "Estação Ecológica Acauã", Ambiente Brasil (in Portuguese)
- Estação Ecológica de Acauã (in Portuguese), IEF, archived from the original on 2021-09-05
- IEF realiza Dia de Campo na Estação Ecológica Acauã (in Portuguese), IEF, archived from the original on 2021-09-05
- MPMG cobra na Justiça a estruturação de unidades de conservação e proteção ambiental do estado (in Portuguese), MPMG, 2013-10-04, archived from the original on 2016-05-14
