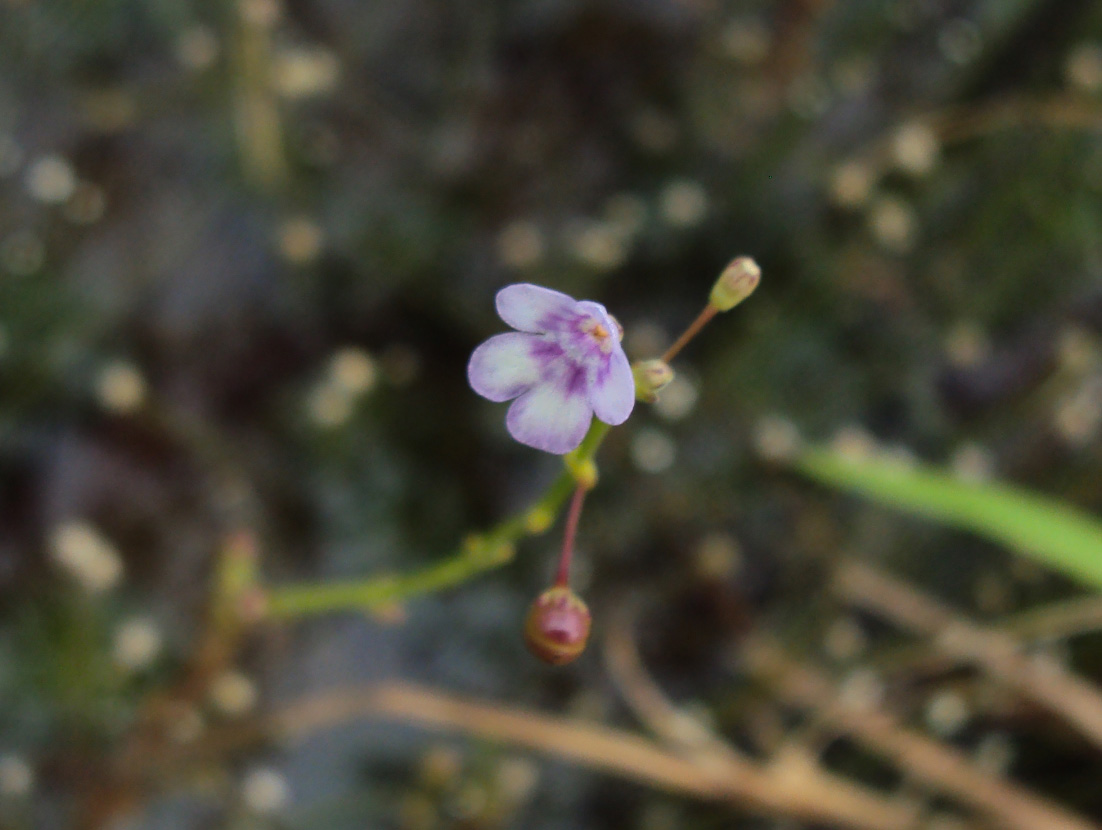
- Dopatrium junceum

Scientific classification
- Kingdom: Plantae
- Clade: Tracheophytes
- Clade: Angiosperms
- Clade: Eudicots
- Clade: Asterids
- Order: Lamiales
- Family: Plantaginaceae
- Genus: Dopatrium; Buch.-Ham. ex Benth.

= Dopatrium =

Genus of plants

Dopatrium is a genus of flowering plants belonging to the family Plantaginaceae.

Its native range is Tropical and Southern Africa to Southwestern Pacific.

Species:

- Dopatrium acutifolium Bonati
- Dopatrium angolense Skan
- Dopatrium baoulense A.Chev.
- Dopatrium caespitosum P.Taylor
- Dopatrium dortmanna S.Moore
- Dopatrium junceum (Roxb.) Buch.-Ham. ex Benth.
- Dopatrium lobelioides (Retz.) Benth.
- Dopatrium longidens Skan
- Dopatrium macranthum Oliv.
- Dopatrium nudicaule (Rottler) Benth.
- Dopatrium pusillum P.Taylor
- Dopatrium senegalense Benth.
- Dopatrium stachytarphetoides Engl. & Gilg
- Dopatrium tenerum (Hiern) Eb.Fisch.
