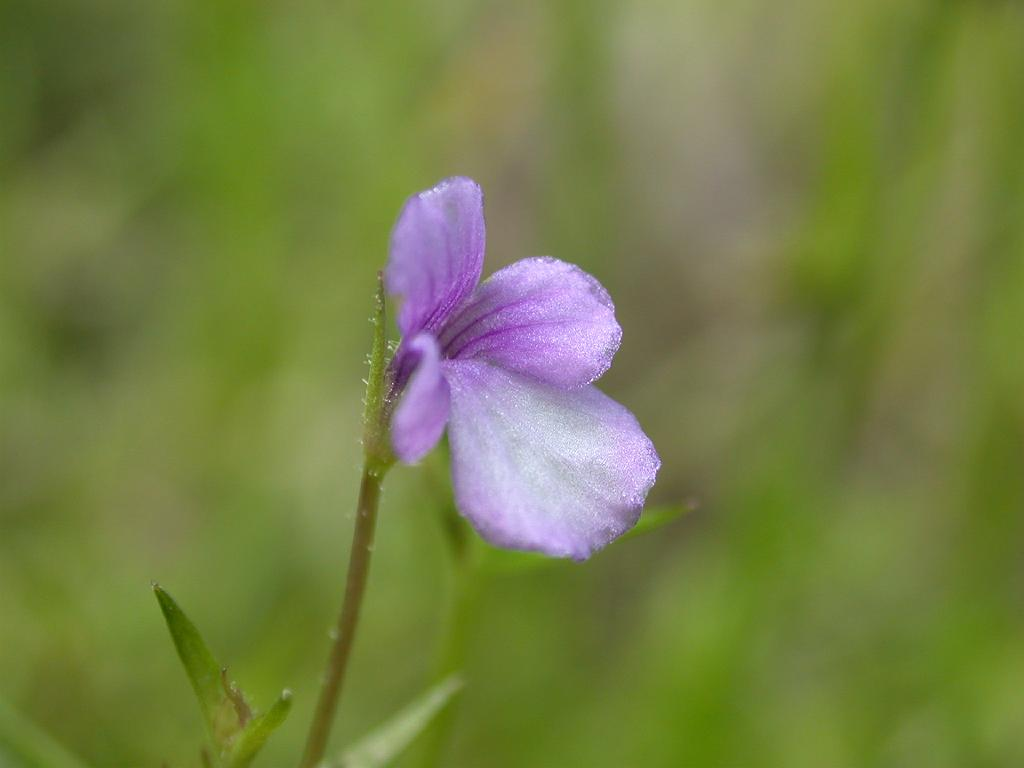
- Deinostema

Scientific classification
- Kingdom: Plantae
- Clade: Tracheophytes
- Clade: Angiosperms
- Clade: Eudicots
- Clade: Asterids
- Order: Lamiales
- Family: Plantaginaceae
- Genus: Deinostema; T.Yamaz.

= Deinostema =

Genus of plants

Deinostema is a genus of flowering plants belonging to the family Plantaginaceae.

Its native range is Southern Russian Far East to Northern and Eastern China, Temperate Eastern Asia.

Species:

- Deinostema adenocaula (Maxim.) T.Yamaz.
- Deinostema violacea (Maxim.) T.Yamaz.
