= Serra do Cabral State Park =

State park in Minas Gerais, Brazil

- Parque Estadual da Serra do Cabral
- IUCN category II (national park)
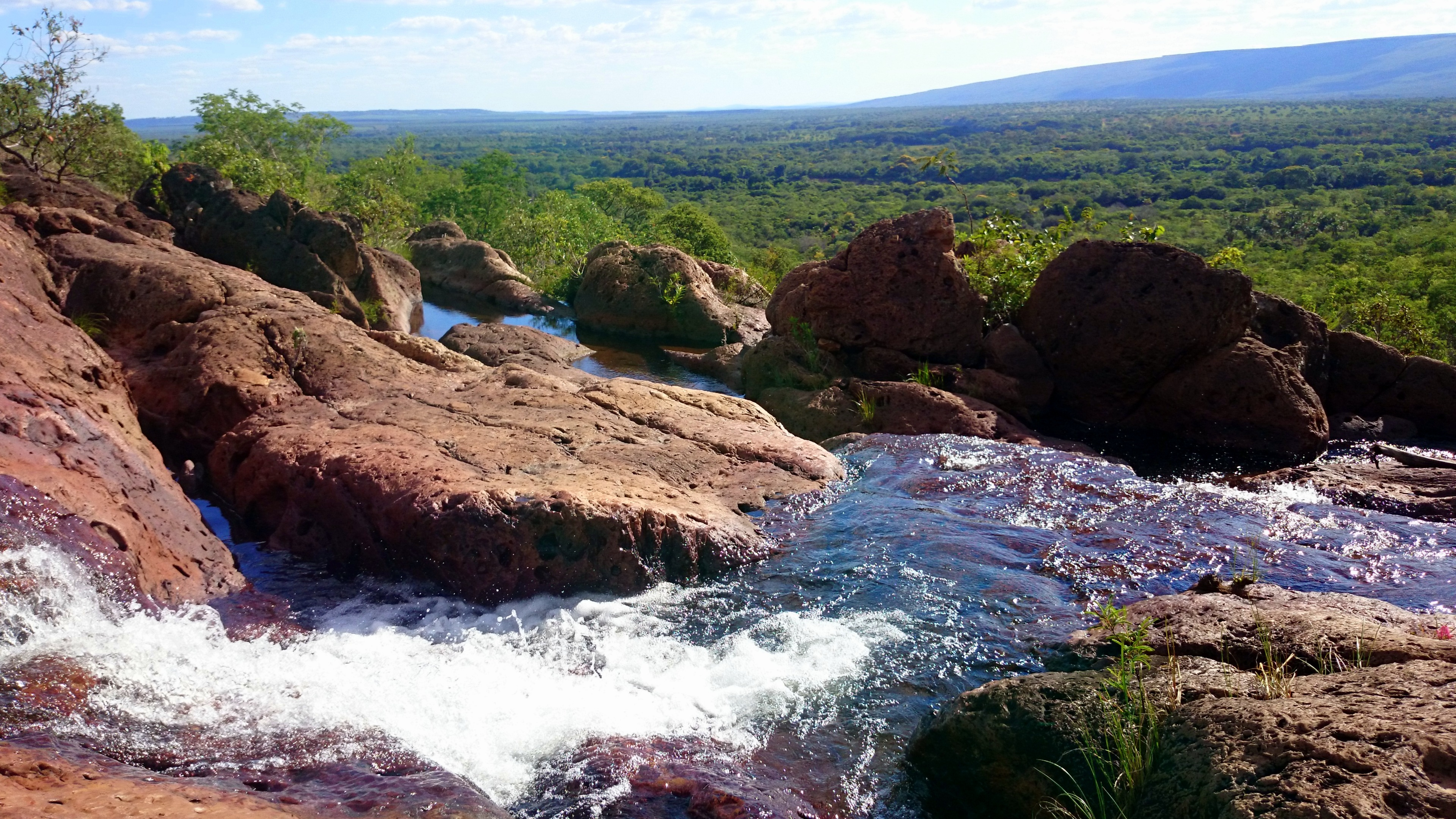
- Cachoeira dos Porcos

- Location within Brazil
- Nearest city: Buenópolis, Minas Gerais
- Coordinates: 17°49′42″S 44°15′49″W
- Area: 22,494 ha (86.85 sq mi)
- Designation: State park
- Created: 29 September 2005
- Administrator: IEF: Instituto Estadual de Florestas

The Serra do Cabral State Park (Portuguese: Parque Estadual da Serra do Cabral) is a state park in the state of Minas Gerais, Brazil.

== Location ==
The Serra do Cabral State Park is divided between the municipalities of Buenópolis and Joaquim Felício in Minas Gerais. It has an area of 22,494 hectares (55,580 acres). The park is in the north-central region of the state in the Serra do Cabral range, part of the Espinhaço Mountains. Altitudes vary from 900 to 1,300 metres (3,000 to 4,300 ft). The park is on the watershed between the das Velhas and Jequitaí rivers, both right tributaries of the São Francisco River. There are many waterfalls and natural pools. Springs in the park supply water to the urban areas of Buenópolis and Joaquim Felício.

Vegetation includes forest and cerrado, including evergreens and sweet palmetto (Euterpe edulis). Fauna include the threatened South American tapir (Tapirus terrestris). The park holds many prehistoric archaeological sites. There are cave paintings representing animals in several places.

== History ==
The Serra do Cabral State Park was created by decree 44.121 of 29 September 2005. The park became part of the Espinhaço Mosaic of conservation units, created in 2010. As of 2014 access to the park was restricted, since the archaeological sites were still being studied. The management plan was published in June 2015.

== Sources ==
- Parque Estadual da Serra do Cabral (in Portuguese), IEF: Instituto Estadual de Florestas, archived from the original on 2017-01-16
- Sartori, Marcos Aurélio (June 2015), Plano de Manejo do Parque Estadual da Serra do Cabral (PDF) (in Portuguese), vol. II - Planejamento e Manual de Gestão, IEF
- Soto, Jorge (29 January 2014), "Travessia Sul da Serra do Cabral", AltaMontanha.com (in Portuguese), archived from the original on 13 January 2017
- Teixeira, Izabella (26 November 2010), Portaria no- 444, de 26 de Novembro de 2010 (PDF) (in Portuguese), archived from the original (PDF) on 2017-02-02
