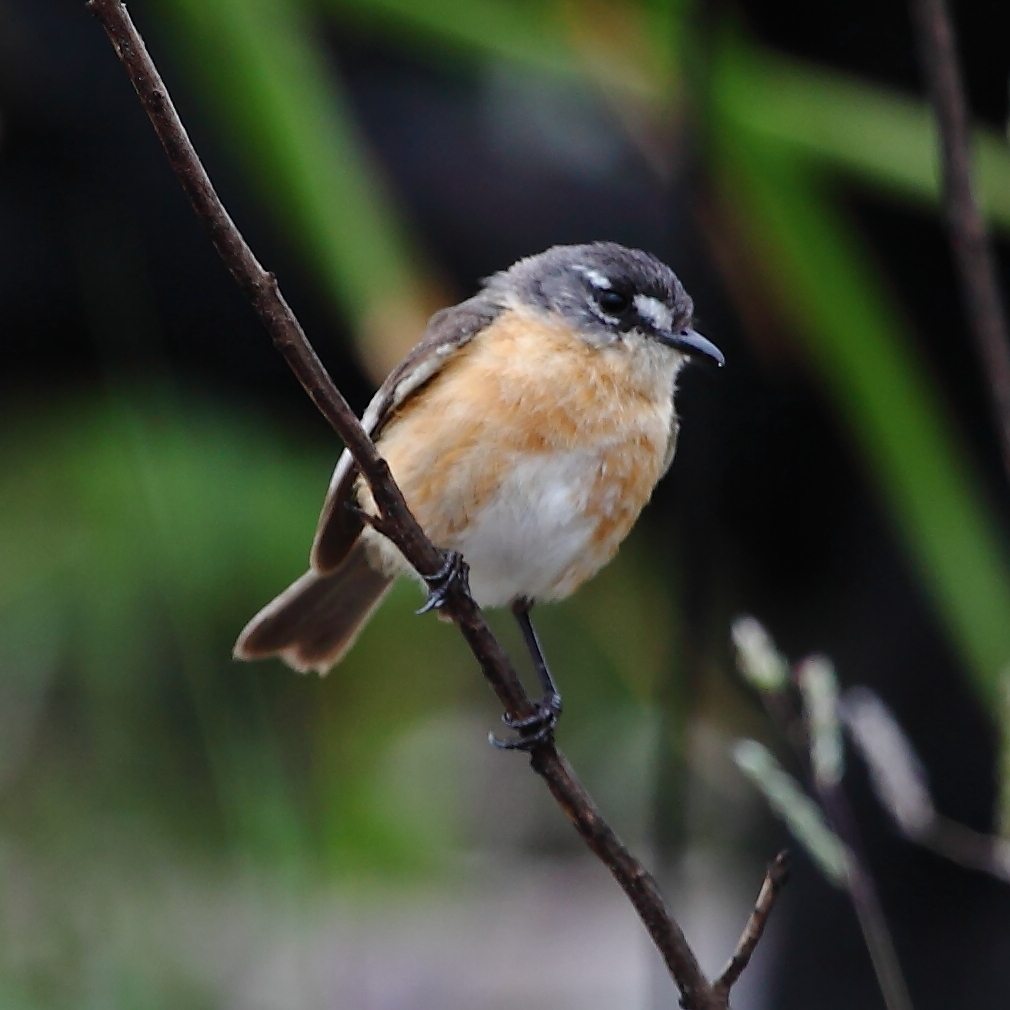
- In Serra da Canastra, Brazil

Conservation status
- Least Concern (IUCN 3.1)

Scientific classification
- Kingdom: Animalia
- Phylum: Chordata
- Class: Aves
- Order: Passeriformes
- Family: Tyrannidae
- Genus: Polystictus
- Species: P. superciliaris

Binomial name
- Polystictus superciliaris (Wied, 1831)

= Grey-backed tachuri =

Species of bird

The grey-backed tachuri (Polystictus superciliaris) is a species of bird in subfamily Elaeniinae of family Tyrannidae, the tyrant flycatchers. It is endemic to Brazil.

== Taxonomy and systematics ==
The grey-backed tachuri shares genus Polystictus with the bearded tachuri (P. pectoralis) but several authors have described the relationship as weak and needing confirmation.

The grey-backed tachuri is monotypic.

== Description ==
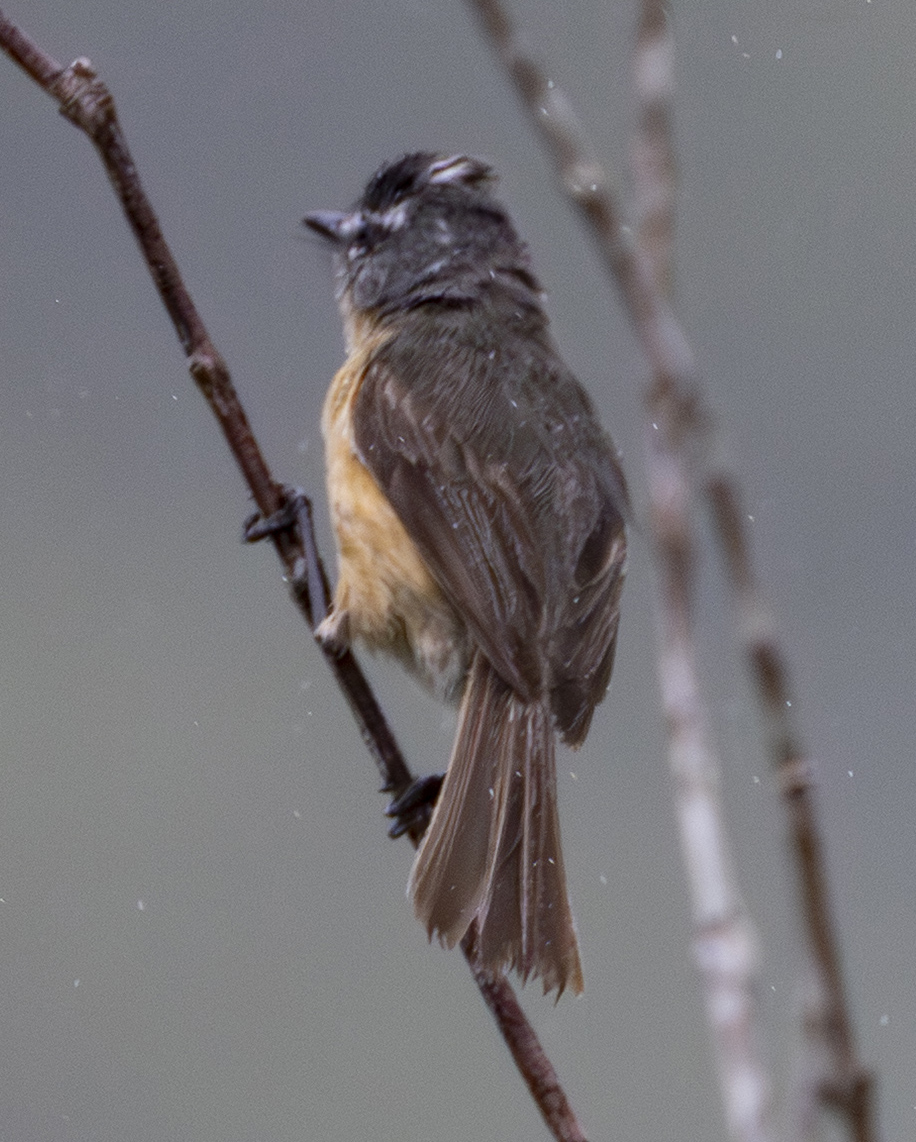
NE Brazil.

The grey-backed tachuri is 9.5 to 10 cm (3.7 to 3.9 in) long and weighs about 6 grams (0.21 oz). The sexes have the same plumage. Adults have a gray crown with a short crest; the crown's white center is mostly hidden. They have a short white supercilium, a white eye ring, and a thin blackish line through the eye on a face that is otherwise thinly striped with black and white. Their upperparts are brownish gray. Their wings are dark dusky brown with slightly paler brown edges on the flight feathers and tips on the wing coverts; the last show as two wing bars. Their tail is dusky. Their chin is whitish. Their throat and underparts are mostly pinkish buff that becomes white on the lower belly. Juveniles have a cream-colored belly. Both sexes have a dark brown iris, a black bill, and black legs and feet.

== Distribution and habitat ==
The grey-backed tachuri has a disjunct distribution in eastern Brazil. One population is found in central Bahia. Another is found from northern Minas Gerais south into northern Paraná. It also occurs locally in scattered locations north and west of those main populations. It primarily inhabits campos rupestres, a rocky grassland biome with scattered shrubs. It also occurs in brushy deserted pastures and, at higher elevations, grasslands and brushy edges of cloudforest. In elevation it ranges from 900 to 2,300 m (3,000 to 7,500 ft) but is mostly found below 1,700 m (5,600 ft).

== Behavior ==
=== Movement ===
The grey-backed tachuri is a year-round resident throughout its range.

=== Feeding ===
The grey-backed tachuri feeds mostly on insects. It usually forages singly and sometimes in pairs or trios. It perches high in grass or a shrub, gleaning from the perch and making short flights just above the vegetation to hover-glean or move to another perch.

=== Breeding ===
The grey-backed tachuri breeds between July and September. Its nest is a small cup made from rootlets and moss and is typically in a branch fork in a small shrub. The clutch is one or two eggs. The incubation period, time to fledging, and details of parental care are not known.

=== Vocalization ===
The grey-backed tachuri's song is a "nervous, sustained 'tititi---' interrupted by toneless 'purrrrr' trill". Its call is a "series of thin, compact 'eeh-uk' " notes.

== Status ==
The IUCN originally in 1988 assessed the grey-backed tachuri as Threatened, then in 2004 as Near Threatened, and since 2011 as of Least Concern when its range was found to be larger than previously thought. Its population size is not known and is believed to be decreasing. "Increasing conversion of land for cattle ranching is currently the principal threat, although it persists in partially degraded areas." It is considered generally uncommon and local. It occurs in several national parks.
