= Hydrotriche =

Scientific classification
- Kingdom: Plantae
- Clade: Tracheophytes
- Clade: Angiosperms
- Clade: Eudicots
- Clade: Asterids
- Order: Lamiales
- Family: Plantaginaceae
- Genus: Hydrotriche; Zucc.

Genus of plants

Hydrotriche is a genus of flowering plants belonging to the family Plantaginaceae.

Its native range is Madagascar.

Species:

- Hydrotriche bryoides A.Raynal
- Hydrotriche galiifolia A.Raynal
- Hydrotriche hottoniiflora Zucc.
- Hydrotriche mayacoides A.Raynal
