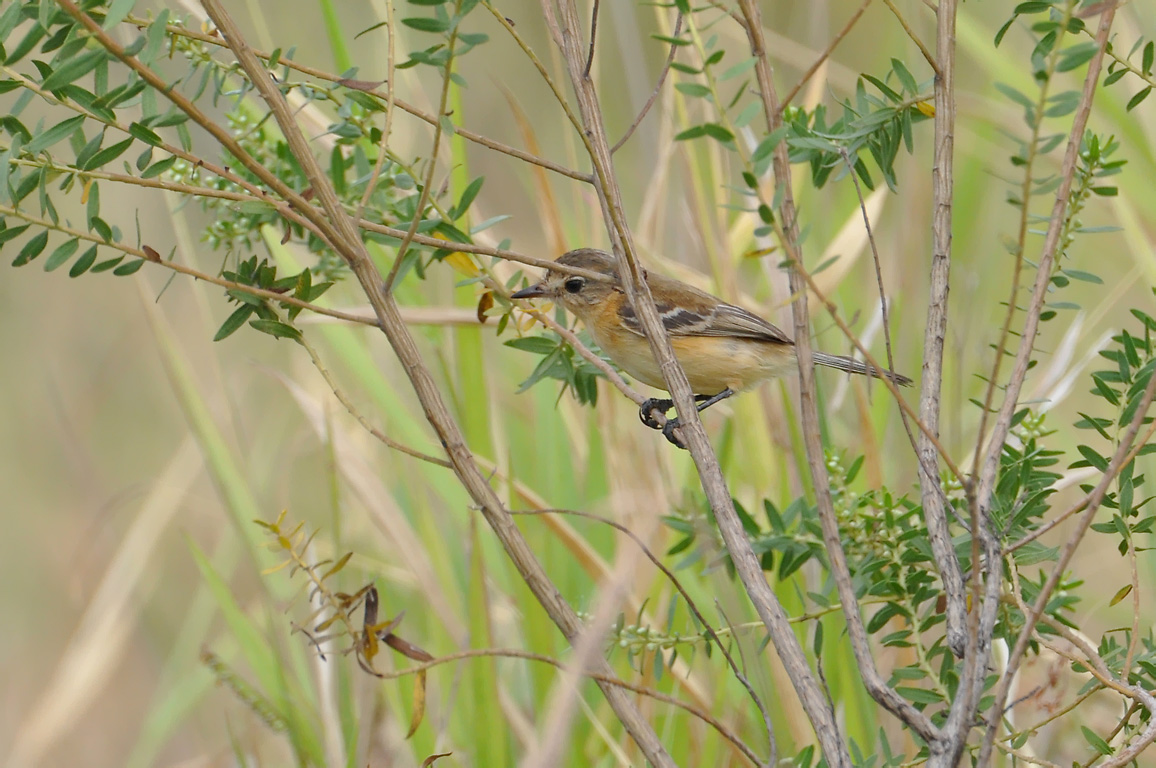
- Bearded tachuri (Polystictus pectoralis)

Scientific classification
- Kingdom: Animalia
- Phylum: Chordata
- Class: Aves
- Order: Passeriformes
- Family: Tyrannidae
- Genus: Polystictus; Reichenbach, 1850

Type species
- Platyrhynchus minimus Gould, 1839

= Polystictus (bird) =

Genus of birds

Polystictus is a genus of South American birds in the tyrant flycatcher family Tyrannidae commonly known as tachuris.

The genus contains the following two species:

Genus Polystictus – Reichenbach, 1850 – two species
Common name	Scientific name and subspecies	Range	Size and ecology	IUCN status and estimated population
Bearded tachuri	Polystictus pectoralis (Vieillot, 1817)	Argentina, Bolivia, Brazil, Colombia, French Guiana, Guyana, Paraguay, Suriname, Uruguay, and Venezuela.	Size: Habitat: Diet:	NT
Grey-backed tachuri	Polystictus superciliaris (Wied, 1831)	Brazil.	Size: Habitat: Diet:	LC
