= Piatã =

Municipality of Bahia, Brazil

- Municipality
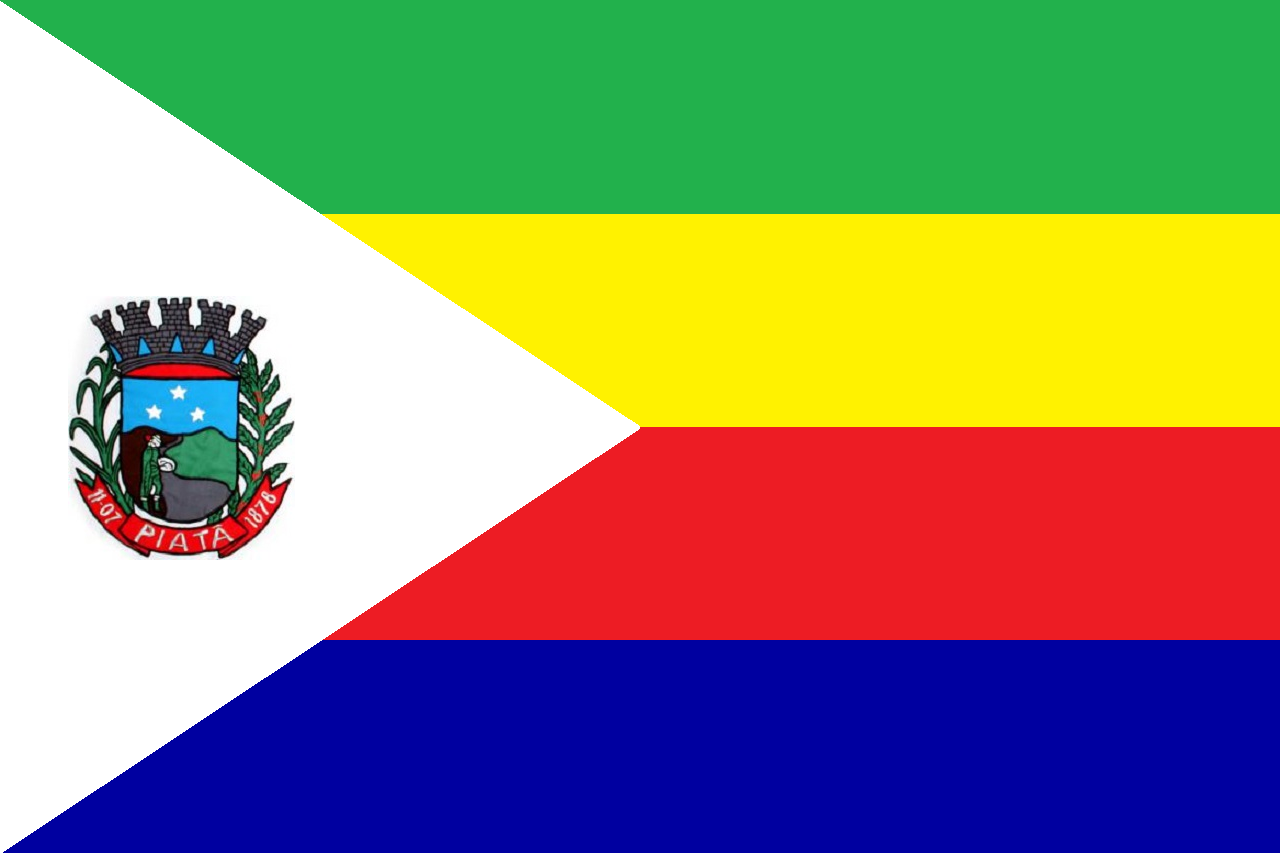
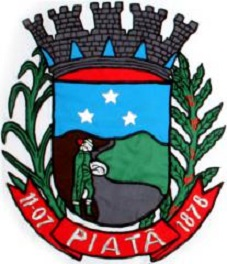
- Flag Coat of arms

- Location in Bahia state

- Location in Brazil
- Coordinates: 13°9′7″S 41°46′22″W
- Country: Brazil
- Region: Northeast
- State: Bahia

Area
  - Total: 1,825.86 km^{2} (704.97 sq mi)

Population (2020)
  - Total: 16,984
  - Density: 9.3019/km^{2} (24.092/sq mi)
- Time zone: UTC−3 (BRT)

Piatã is a municipality in the state of Bahia in Brazil, located on the Chapada Diamantina. The population is 20,859 (2024 est.) in an area of 1825.86 km^{2}.

The elevation is 1,268 m, with the city center at 1,280 m. It is the highest and coldest municipality of the Northeast Region of Brazil. It is also the oldest settlement of the Chapada Diamantina, staring from the mid XVII century.

== Etymology ==
The word "Piatã" comes from the tupi language. It means "hard feet", from the union of the terms py (foot) and atã (hard). Atã may also mean firm and/or strong.

== History ==
The settlement began on the mid-XVII century with the discovery of mines on the Tromba and Santana mountain ranges. Many adventures moved in search of gold and precious gems, founding the village of Bom Jesus dos Limões, later renamed Piatã.

== Culture ==
=== Material Heritage ===
Piatã has two copies of religious architecture listed in the state sphere: the Chapel of Our Lady of the Rosary (Capela Nossa Senhora do Rosário) and the Mother Church of Bom Jesus. The latter was created as a chapel in the mid-18th century and transformed into a matrix in the year 1842.
