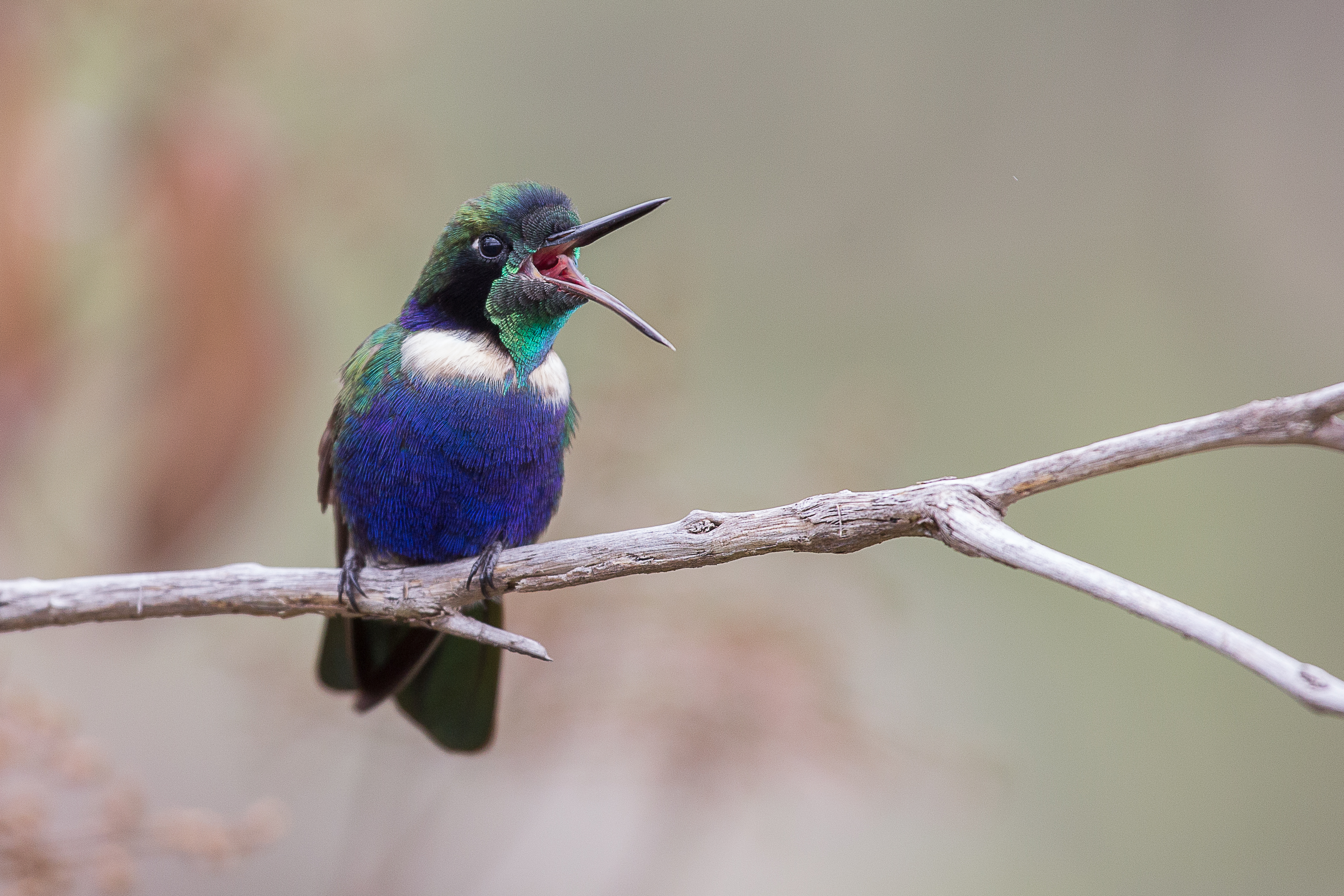
- In SE Brazil

Conservation status
- Least Concern (IUCN 3.1)
- CITES Appendix II

Scientific classification
- Kingdom: Animalia
- Phylum: Chordata
- Class: Aves
- Order: Apodiformes
- Family: Trochilidae
- Genus: Augastes
- Species: A. scutatus

Binomial name
- Augastes scutatus (Temminck, 1824)

= Hyacinth visorbearer =

Species of hummiingbird

The hyacinth visorbearer (Augastes scutatus) is a species of hummingbird in the family Trochilidae. It is endemic to Brazil.

== Taxonomy and systematics ==
The hyacinth visorbearer shares its genus with only one other species, the hooded visorbearer (A. lumachella). It has three subspecies, the nominate A. s. scutatus, A. s. ilseae, and A. s. soaresi. The subspecies are very similar and "might be better treated as monotypic."

== Description ==
Hyacinth visorbearer males are 8.1 to 9.9 cm (3.2 to 3.9 in) long and weigh 3 to 4 g (0.11 to 0.14 oz). Females are 8 to 9.7 cm (3.1 to 3.8 in) long and weigh 2.7 to 3.8 g (0.10 to 0.13 oz). In addition to being longer overall and heavier than females, males also have longer wings and tail. Both sexes have a short bill, but that of the male is longer. Males of the nominate subspecies have a shiny golden green forehead; the rest of the upperparts and the tail are bronze-green. The throat is also shiny golden green with a black edge and the belly is deep blue; between them is a creamy white to pink band across the chest. The sides of the neck have a purplish blue "ruff". The female lacks the black edge to the green throat, the blue belly is mottled with gray and blue-green, and the outer tail feathers are tipped with gray. A. s. ilseae has dark violet ruffs, a violet-blue belly, and bluish green on the underside of the tail. A. s. soaresi is the largest subspecies; in plumage it differs from the nominate only by having a blue line between the violet and green areas of the head.

== Distribution and habitat ==
The hyacinth visorbearer is found only in the Brazilian state of Minas Gerais. The nominate subspecies is found at elevations from about 1,000 to 2,000 m (3,300 to 6,600 ft) in the central and eastern parts of the state. It typically inhabits dry rocky areas with low vegetation (campos rupestres). A. s. ilseae has essentially the same range but at elevations between about 900 and 1,200 m (3,000 and 3,900 ft). It is usually found in gallery forest and bushy areas. A. s. soaresi is limited to the upper reaches of the Piracicaba River basin in south-central Minas Gerais. It inhabits ravines in montane forest at elevations between about 1,000 to 1,600 m (3,300 to 5,200 ft).

== Behavior ==
=== Movement ===
The hyacinth visorbearer is sedentary.

=== Feeding ===
The hyacinth visorbearer typically forages 2 to 3 m (6.6 to 9.8 ft) above ground, taking nectar from a wide variety of flowering plants including terrestrial bromeliads and cacti. It also takes small insects by flying out from a perch and returning to it, and sometimes gleans them while perched as well. Males defend feeding territories, especially those with groups of flowering plants; females tend to feed in more sparsely flowered areas and do not defend them.

=== Breeding ===
The hyacinth visorbearer appears to nest at any time of the year. The nest is a small cup of Compositae seeds, cactus "wool", and other fibers. It has leaf and moss fragments attached with spider web to the outer surface and is lined with softer material. It is typically placed in a vertical fork of branches 0.6 to 2 m (2.0 to 6.6 ft) above the ground. The clutch size is two white eggs. Incubation, by the female alone, lasts 15 to 16 days with fledging 19 to 25 days after hatch.

=== Vocalization ===
The hyacinth visorbearer's song is a "series of high, dry 'tjic', 'whi', 'zuzu', and other notes." Only males sing, usually from two or three perches within their territories. Both sexes make a variety of calls in response to threats.

== Status ==
The IUCN originally assessed the hyacinth visorbearer as Threatened; in 2004 it was reassessed as Near Threatened and then in 2018 as being of Least Concern. Though its population size is unknown it is believed to be stable. It has a restricted range, but its habitat is mostly unsuited to agriculture so mining appears to be the only immediate potential threat. It is locally common and occurs in several protected areas.
