= Espinhaço Mountains =

Mountain range in Brazil

- Serra do Espinhaço (Portuguese)
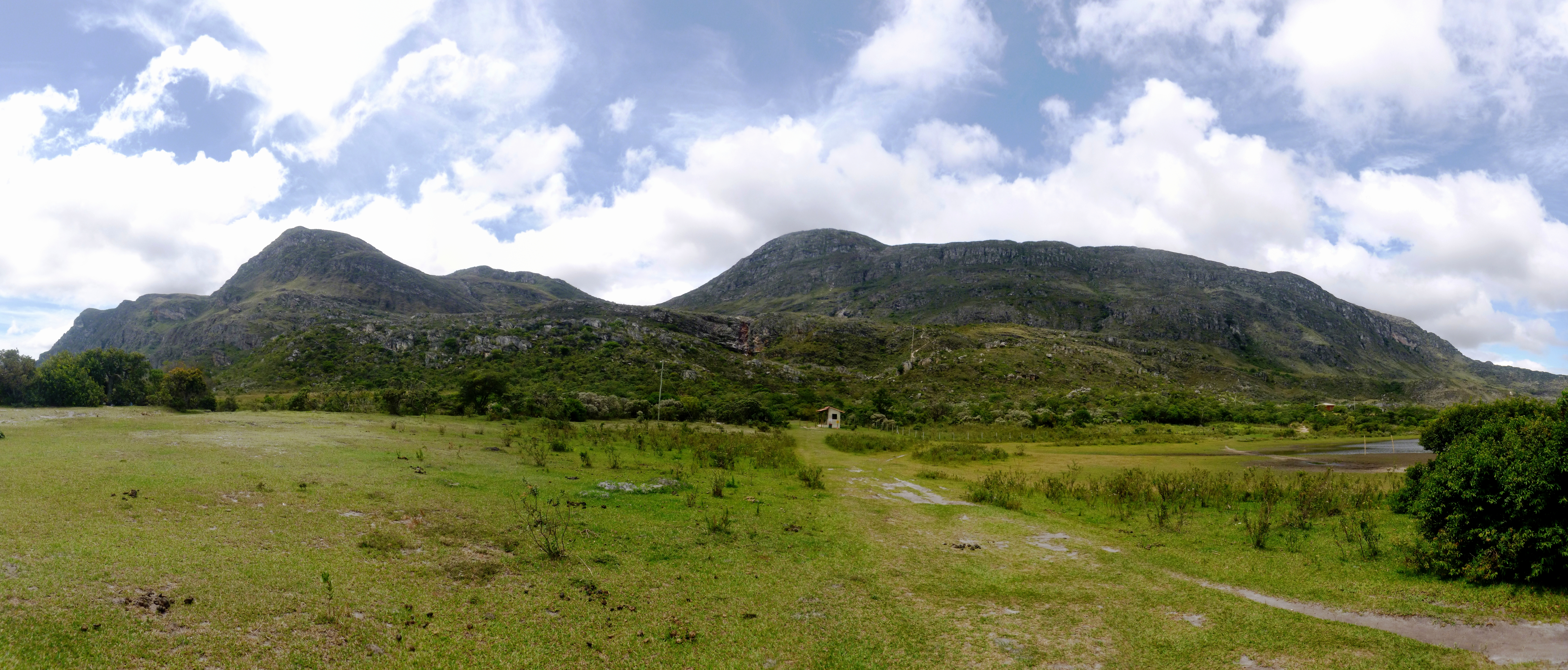
- Espinhaço Mountains viewed from Lapinha da Serra

Highest point
- Peak: Pico do Sol, Minas Gerais
- Elevation: 2,081 m (6,827 ft)
- Coordinates: 17°41′39.9″S 43°46′59.9″W

Dimensions
- Length: 1,100 km (680 mi)

Geography
- Location within Brazil
- Country: Brazil
- States: Minas Gerais and Bahia

The Espinhaço Mountains (Portuguese: Serra do Espinhaço, IPA: [ˈsɛʁɐ dw ispĩˈɲasu]) are a mountain range in Brazil. The range runs roughly north and south through the states of Minas Gerais and Bahia, extending for approximately 1,100 km (680 mi). It forms the divide between the upper watershed of the São Francisco River and those of the shorter rivers which flow east into the Atlantic Ocean, including the Doce, the Jequitinhonha, and the Pardo rivers. Pico do Sol, its highest peak, rises to 2,081 metres (6,827 ft), in Catas Altas town (Caraça Private Natural Heritage Reserve). The historical town of Diamantina is located in the Espinhaço Mountains. The Espinhaço Mountains were a major route through which Minas Gerais was settled during the Brazilian Gold Rush of the 18th century.
