= Immediate Geographic Region of Diamantina =

Urban administrative region in Minas Gerais, Brazil

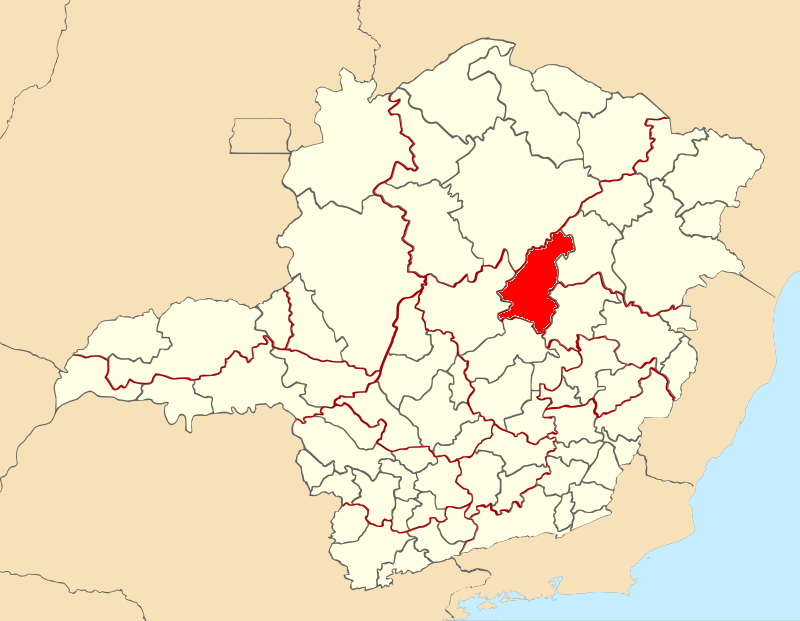
Immediate Geographic Region of Diamantina, in the state of Minas Gerais, Brazil.

The Immediate Geographic Region of Diamantina is one of the 7 immediate geographic regions in the Intermediate Geographic Region of Teófilo Otoni, one of the 70 immediate geographic regions in the Brazilian state of Minas Gerais and one of the 509 of Brazil, created by the National Institute of Geography and Statistics (IBGE) in 2017.

== Municipalities ==
It comprises 13 municipalities.

- Alvorada de Minas
- Carbonita
- Couto de Magalhães de Minas
- Datas
- Diamantina
- Felício dos Santos
- Gouveia
- Presidente Kubitschek
- Santo Antônio do Itambé
- São Gonçalo do Rio Preto
- Senador Modestino Gonçalves
- Serra Azul de Minas
- Serro

== See also ==
- List of Intermediate and Immediate Geographic Regions of Minas Gerais
