= Itambé =

Itambé may refer to one of these three municipalities in Brazil:

- Itambé, Bahia
- Itambé, Paraná
- Itambé, Pernambuco

Additionally, these three locations incorporate the word within their name:

- Itambé do Mato Dentro
- Pico do Itambé State Park
- Santo Antônio do Itambé

Itambé may also refer to:

== Biology ==
- Itambe, a monotypic genus of moths
- Crossodactylodes itambe, a frog whose species epithet refers to the aforementioned Pico do Itambé State Park

== People with the name ==
- Itambé (footballer)

== Other ==
- Itambé Alimentos, a dairy company usually referred to by simply Itambé
