= Diamantina, Minas Gerais =

Municipality in Minas Gerais, Brazil

Diamantina
- Municipality
- Municipality of Diamantina
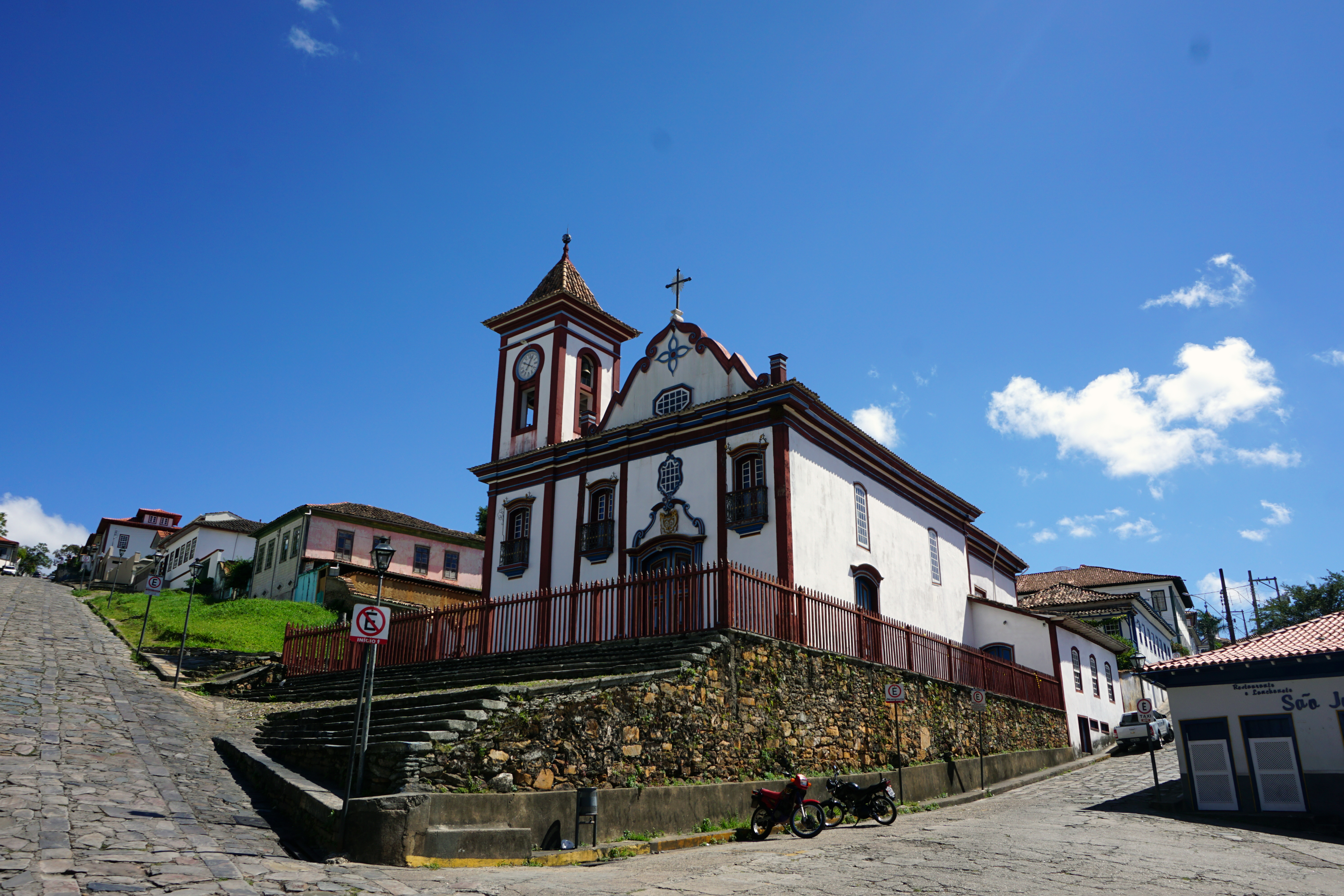
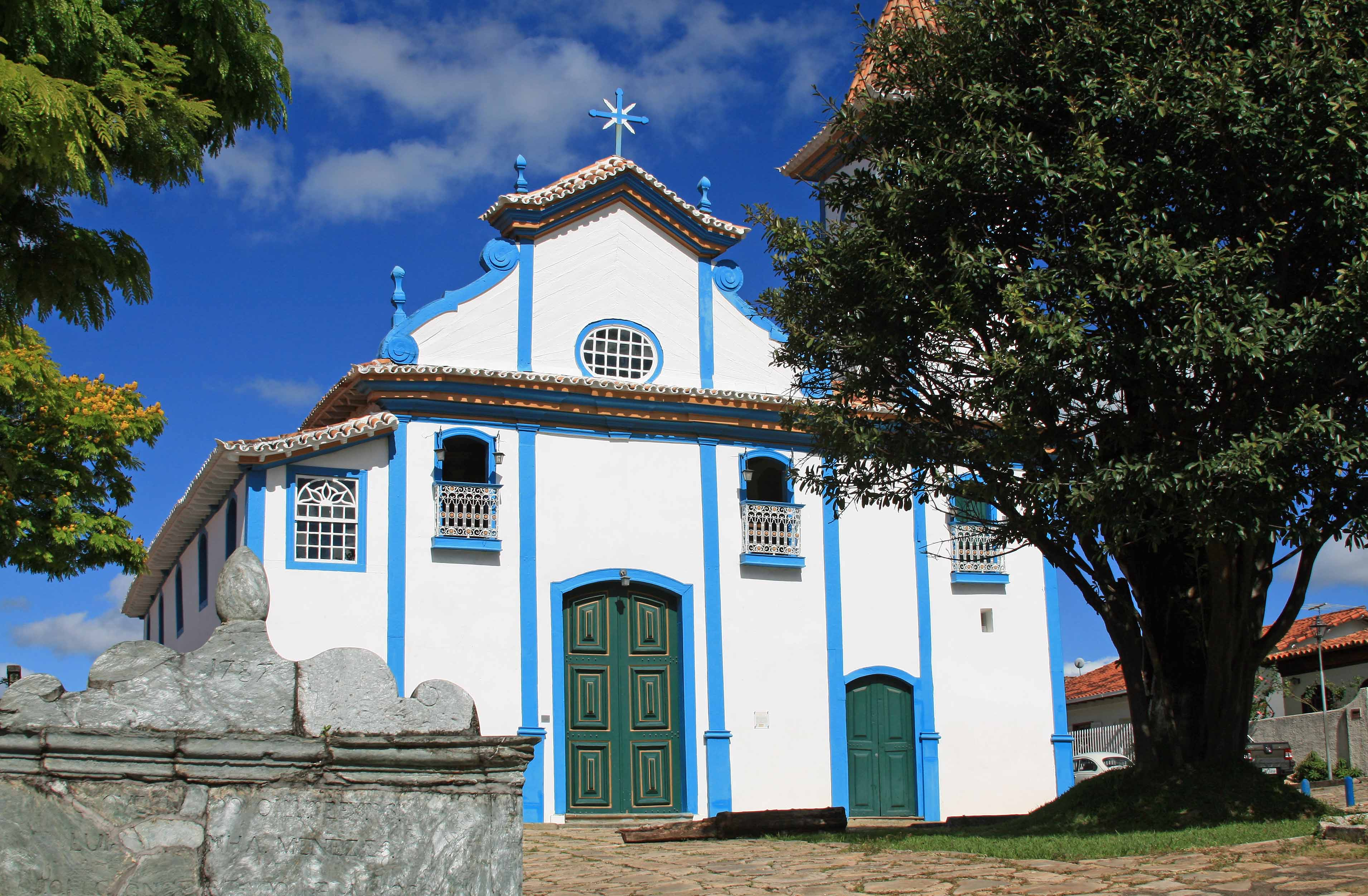
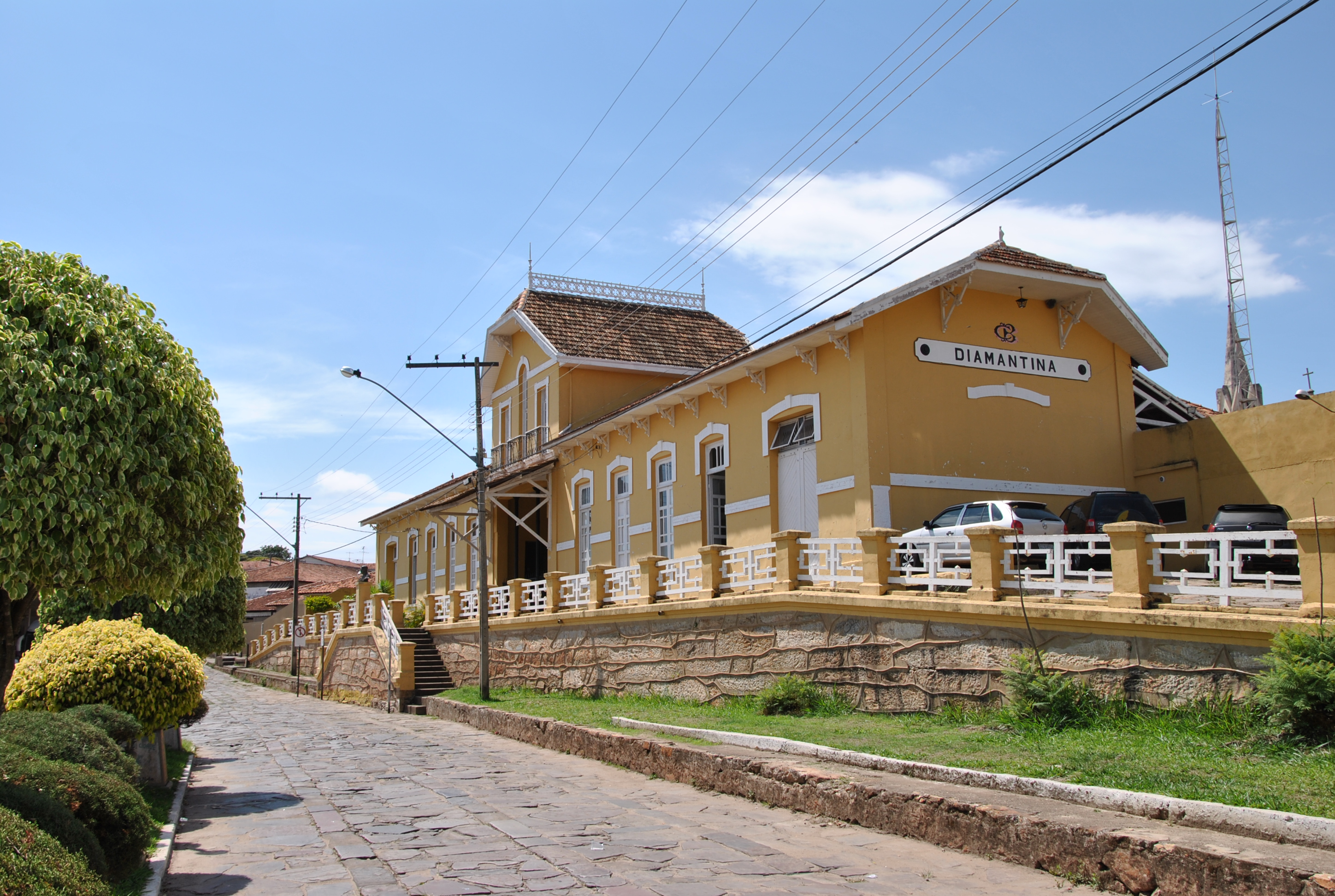
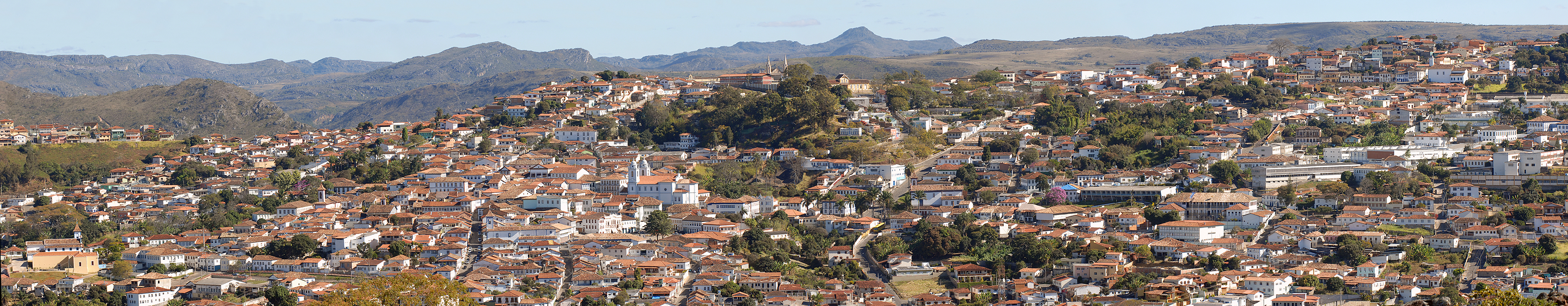

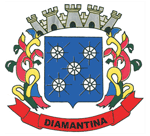
- Flag Coat of arms

- Location in Minas Gerais
- Country: Brazil
- State: Minas Gerais
- Region: Southeast
- Intermediate Region: Teófilo Otoni
- Immediate Region: Diamantina
- Founded: 6 March 1831

Government
  - Mayor: Juscelino Brasiliano Roque (DEM)

Area
  - Total: 3,869 km^{2} (1,494 sq mi)

Population (2020)
  - Total: 47,825
  - Density: 12.3/km^{2} (32/sq mi)
- Demonym: Diamantinense
- Time zone: UTC−3 (BRT)
- Postal Code: 39100-000
- Area code: +55 38
- HDI (2010): 0.716 – high
- Website: diamantina.mg.gov.br

UNESCO World Heritage Site
- Official name: Historic Centre of the Town of Diamantina
- Type: Cultural
- Criteria: (ii); (iv)
- Designated: 1999
- Reference no.: 890
- Region: South America

Diamantina (Portuguese pronunciation: [dʒiamɐ̃ˈtʃinɐ]) is a municipality in central Minas Gerais, Brazil. It had a population of 47,702 in the 2022 census, with an estimated population of 49,493 in 2025, in an area of 3,891.659 km^{2} (1,502.578 sq mi). It is part of the Immediate Geographic Region of Diamantina, within the Intermediate Geographic Region of Teófilo Otoni.

The settlement developed as Arraial do Tijuco during the eighteenth-century diamond rush. Its historic center, known for its colonial streets and architecture, was designated a World Heritage Site by UNESCO in 1999.

== Statistical micro-region ==
Diamantina is a statistical micro-region that includes the following municipalities: Diamantina, Datas, Felício dos Santos, Gouveia, Presidente Kubitschek, São Gonçalo do Rio Preto, Senador Modestino Gonçalves, and Couto de Magalhães de Minas. The area of this region is 7,348 km^{2} and in 2006 the population was 80,063 inhabitants. The population density in 2000 was 11.2 inhabitants/km^{2}.

== History ==
=== Prehistory ===
Before the arrival of Portuguese settlers, in the 16th century (the first reports give account of expeditions that went up the Jequitinhonha and São Francisco Rivers), Diamantina, like the entire region of the current state of Minas Gerais, was occupied by indigenous peoples of the Macro-Jê languages.

=== Foundation and exploration of diamonds ===
Diamantina was founded as Arraial do Tejuco in 1713, with the construction of a chapel that honored the patron Saint Anthony of Padua. The locality had strong growth when the Diamonds were discovered in 1729. At the end of the 18th century, it was the third largest population in the Captaincy General of Minas, behind the capital Vila Rica, today Ouro Preto, and with a population similar to that of the prosperous São João del-Rei.

In the 18th century it grew due to the large local production of diamonds, which were exploited by the Portuguese crown. In 1697, the Estrada Real was established by the crown to promote development of the interior, reaching from the coast through Ouro Preto onwards to Diamantina. The town was initially known as Arraial do Tejuco (or Tijuco) (from the Tupi tyîuka, "rotten water"), Tejuco and Ybyty'ro'y (Tupi word meaning "cold mountain", by the junction of ybytyra ("mountain").) and ro'y ("cold"). During the 18th century, the city was famous for having sheltered Chica da Silva, a freed slave who was the wife of the richest man in Colonial Brazil, João Fernandes de Oliveira.

Diamantina represented the largest mining of diamonds in the western world in the 18th century, and for nine years, the Portuguese Crown was not aware of the discovery of diamonds in the region, which was done by the governor of the Captaincy, in 1729, the then D. Lourenço de Almeida. Portugal's response was to impose full control over the diamond regions of Minas Gerais. In 1734, the Intendency of Diamonds was created, whose regime was totally controlling and authoritarian. The Portuguese Crown's monopoly over diamond deposits lasted until 1845.

=== Incorporation, transformation into historical heritage and recent history ===
Diamantina emancipated itself from the municipality of Serro only in 1831, changing its name to Diamantina because of the large volume of diamonds found in the region. The delay was due to the need for greater local control by the colonial authorities, since in the mid-18th century the population was larger than that of Vila do Príncipe do Serro Frio, head of the region. Life in Diamantina at the end of the 19th century was portrayed by Alice Brant in her book Minha Vida de Menina, which became a landmark in Brazilian literature after being rediscovered by Elizabeth Bishop.

Mining for diamonds near Diamantina. River has been diverted by means of the flume shown in the middle ground, and the dried bed is searched for diamonds

In 1938, Diamantina celebrated its 100th anniversary as a city, receiving the title of "National Historic Heritage" from the National Institute of Historic and Artistic Heritage.

With the arrival of Juscelino Kubitschek to the state government and later to the Presidency of the Republic, many improvements were made in Diamantina, such as the foundation of the Federal School of Dentistry of Diamantina, the Hotel Tijuco, the Júlia Kubitschek State School and the Diamantina Sports Square.

In 1999, it was elevated to the category of "heritage of humanity" by the United Nations Educational, Scientific and Cultural Organization.

== Geography ==
Diamantina is located 292 kilometers almost directly north of the state capital, Belo Horizonte, in a mountainous area. The elevation of the municipal seat is 1,114 meters. The Jequitinhonha River, one of Brazil's most important rivers, flows to the east of the municipal seat. Diamantina is linked to the state capital by federal highway BR-259, by way of Curvelo. Diamantina Airport has regular flights to Belo Horizonte.

The municipality contains the 16,999-hectare (42,010-acre) Biribiri State Park, created in 1998, which contains the historic village of Biribiri.

Neighboring municipalities are: Olhos d'Água and Bocaiúva (N); Carbonita, Senador Modestino Gonçalves, São Gonçalo do Rio Preto, and Couto de Magalhaes de Minas (E); Santo Antônio do Itambé, Datas, Serro and Monjolos (S); Augusto de Lima, Buenópolis, and Engenheiro Navarro (W).

=== Climate ===
Climate data for Diamantina, Minas Gerais, 1981-2010 normals, extremes 1961-2010
Month	Jan	Feb	Mar	Apr	May	Jun	Jul	Aug	Sep	Oct	Nov	Dec	Year
Record high °C (°F)	32.7 (90.9)	31.6 (88.9)	31.0 (87.8)	30.2 (86.4)	28.8 (83.8)	27.4 (81.3)	28.2 (82.8)	30.5 (86.9)	33.1 (91.6)	35.8 (96.4)	33.6 (92.5)	31.6 (88.9)	35.8 (96.4)
Mean daily maximum °C (°F)	25.8 (78.4)	26.0 (78.8)	25.6 (78.1)	24.6 (76.3)	23.0 (73.4)	21.9 (71.4)	21.4 (70.5)	22.9 (73.2)	24.5 (76.1)	25.5 (77.9)	24.5 (76.1)	24.9 (76.8)	24.2 (75.6)
Daily mean °C (°F)	20.6 (69.1)	20.6 (69.1)	20.3 (68.5)	19.3 (66.7)	17.4 (63.3)	16.1 (61.0)	15.7 (60.3)	16.8 (62.2)	18.4 (65.1)	19.7 (67.5)	19.6 (67.3)	20.0 (68.0)	18.7 (65.7)
Mean daily minimum °C (°F)	16.8 (62.2)	16.7 (62.1)	16.6 (61.9)	15.6 (60.1)	13.6 (56.5)	11.9 (53.4)	11.3 (52.3)	11.8 (53.2)	13.6 (56.5)	15.3 (59.5)	15.9 (60.6)	16.5 (61.7)	14.6 (58.3)
Record low °C (°F)	7.0 (44.6)	11.1 (52.0)	11.8 (53.2)	10.0 (50.0)	5.6 (42.1)	4.6 (40.3)	2.8 (37.0)	6.2 (43.2)	6.7 (44.1)	8.2 (46.8)	6.5 (43.7)	9.9 (49.8)	2.8 (37.0)
Average precipitation mm (inches)	236.7 (9.32)	142.7 (5.62)	185.0 (7.28)	76.6 (3.02)	22.9 (0.90)	6.3 (0.25)	4.7 (0.19)	13.2 (0.52)	33.1 (1.30)	118.5 (4.67)	232.7 (9.16)	302.9 (11.93)	1,375.3 (54.16)
Average precipitation days (≥ 1 mm)	13	11	12	7	3	1	1	2	4	9	15	18	96
Average relative humidity (%)	78.5	76.1	79.5	78.7	77.1	74.8	71.6	68.2	67.9	69.4	79.1	81.6	75.2
Mean monthly sunshine hours	183.7	176.5	182.9	190.5	208.4	190.9	226.3	239.2	195.0	181.6	147.5	149.8	2,272.3
Percentage possible sunshine	46	50	49	55	60	58	66	68	55	47	38	37	52
Source: INMET

== Economic activities ==
The main economic activities are tourism, services, small industry and agriculture. The GDP in 2005 was R$184 million (US$75.58 million), with 140 million coming from services, 23 million from industry, and 8 million from agriculture. In 2006 there were 1,248 rural producers on 73,000 hectares of land. Only 24 of the establishments had tractors. There were 14,000 head of cattle.

== Health and education ==
The social indicators rank Diamantina in the top tier of municipalities in the state.

- Municipal Human Development Index: 0.748 (2000)
- State ranking: 298 out of 853 municipalities as of 2000
- National ranking: 1933 out of 5,138 municipalities as of 2000
- Literacy rate: 86%
- Life expectancy: 68 (average of males and females)
- Infant mortality: 32.8

In terms of HDI, the highest ranking municipality in Minas Gerais in 2000 was Poços de Caldas with 0.841, while the lowest was Setubinha with 0.568. Nationally the highest was São Caetano do Sul in São Paulo with 0.919, while the lowest was Setubinha. In more recent statistics (considering 5,507 municipalities) Manari in the state of Pernambuco has the lowest rating in the country—0,467—putting it in last place.

There were 2 hospitals and 31 health clinics in 2005. Educational needs were met by 30 primary schools and 9 middle schools. There were 3 institutions of higher learning: Faculdade de Ciências Jurídicas de Diamantina - FCJ (a law school), Faculdade de Filosofia e Letras de Diamantina - FAFIDIA (humanities), and Universidade Federal dos Vales do Jequitinhonha e Mucuri - UFVJM (federal public).

== Notable people ==
- Chica da Silva, an enslaved African-Brazilian folk heroine became first lady in the region, after having married a Luso-Brazilian ruler; born circa 1730. Adaptations of her story were made into songs and famous soap operas translated into other languages.
- Alice Dayrell Caldeira Brant (pseudonym: Helena Morley), whose diary Minha vida de menina (translated into English as The Diary of Helena Morley) is a classic in Brazilian literature; born in 1880; died 1970.
- Juscelino Kubitschek de Oliveira, responsible for the creation of the new capital, Brasília, President of Brazil from 1956 to 1961; born in 1902.
- José Vieira Couto de Magalhães, Brazilian general and folklorist; born in 1837.
- Olímpio Mourão Filho, Brazilian general and President of the Superior Military Court; born in 1900.
- Servant of God Benigna Victima de Jesus, Catholic nun (1907–1981).

== Twin towns – sister cities ==
Diamantina is twinned with:

- Daytona Beach, United States

=== Friendly cities ===
Diamantina also cooperates with Třeboň in the Czech Republic.

== See also ==
- Ouro Preto
- List of municipalities in Minas Gerais
- Roman Catholic Archdiocese of Diamantina
