= Datas =

Brazilian municipality

Coordinates: 18°26′45″S 43°39′21″W

- Municipality
- Municipality of Datas
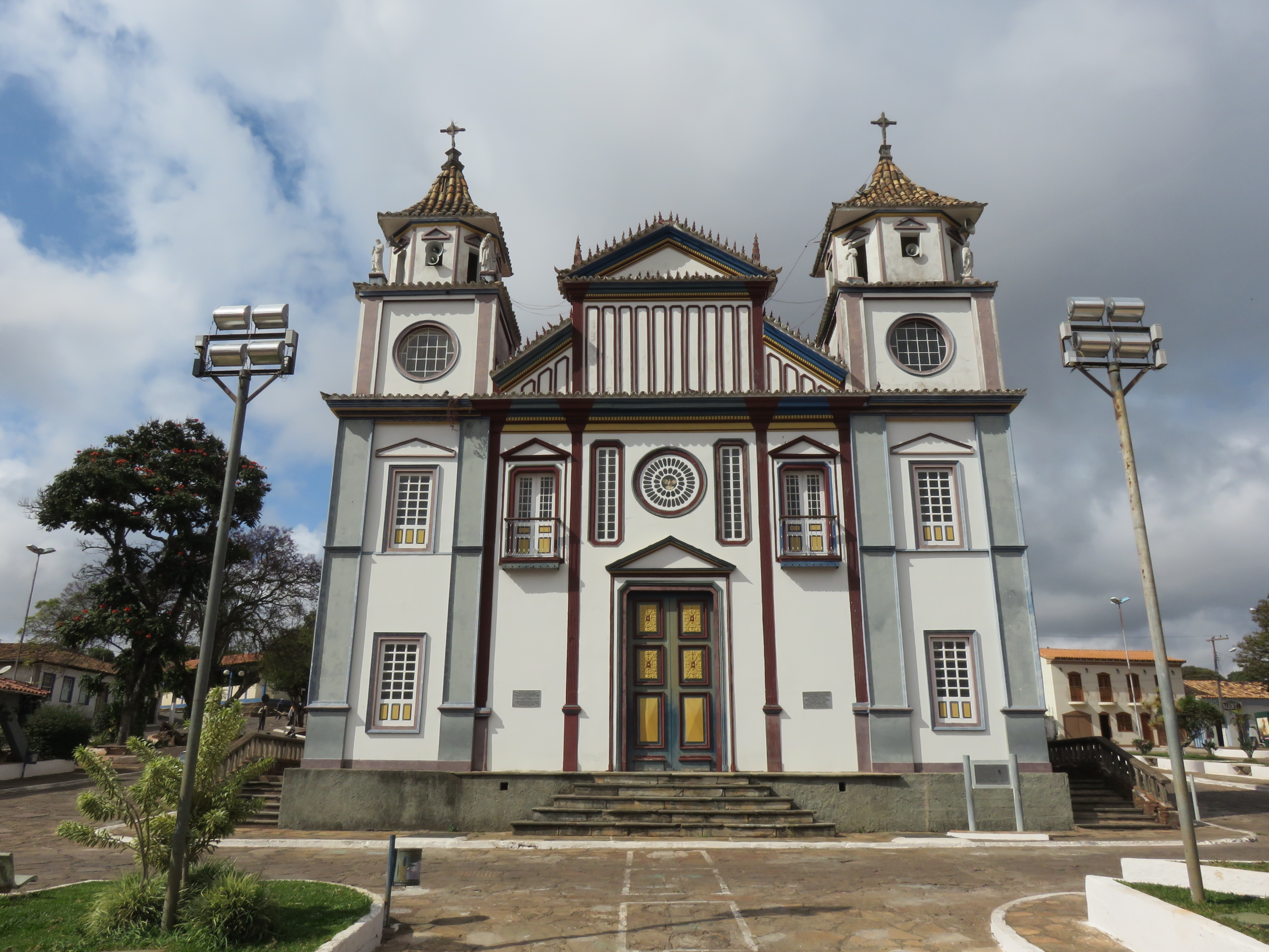
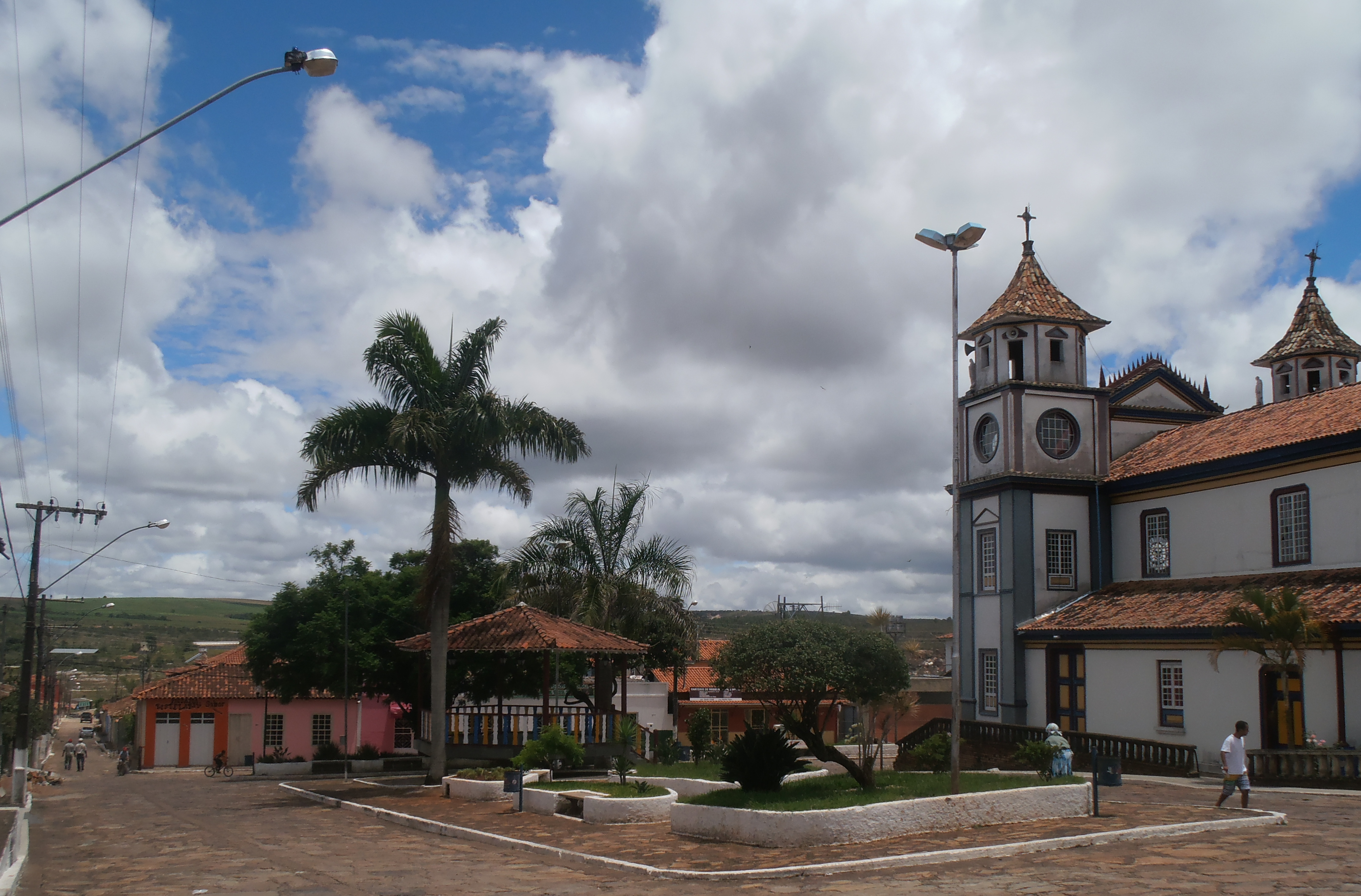
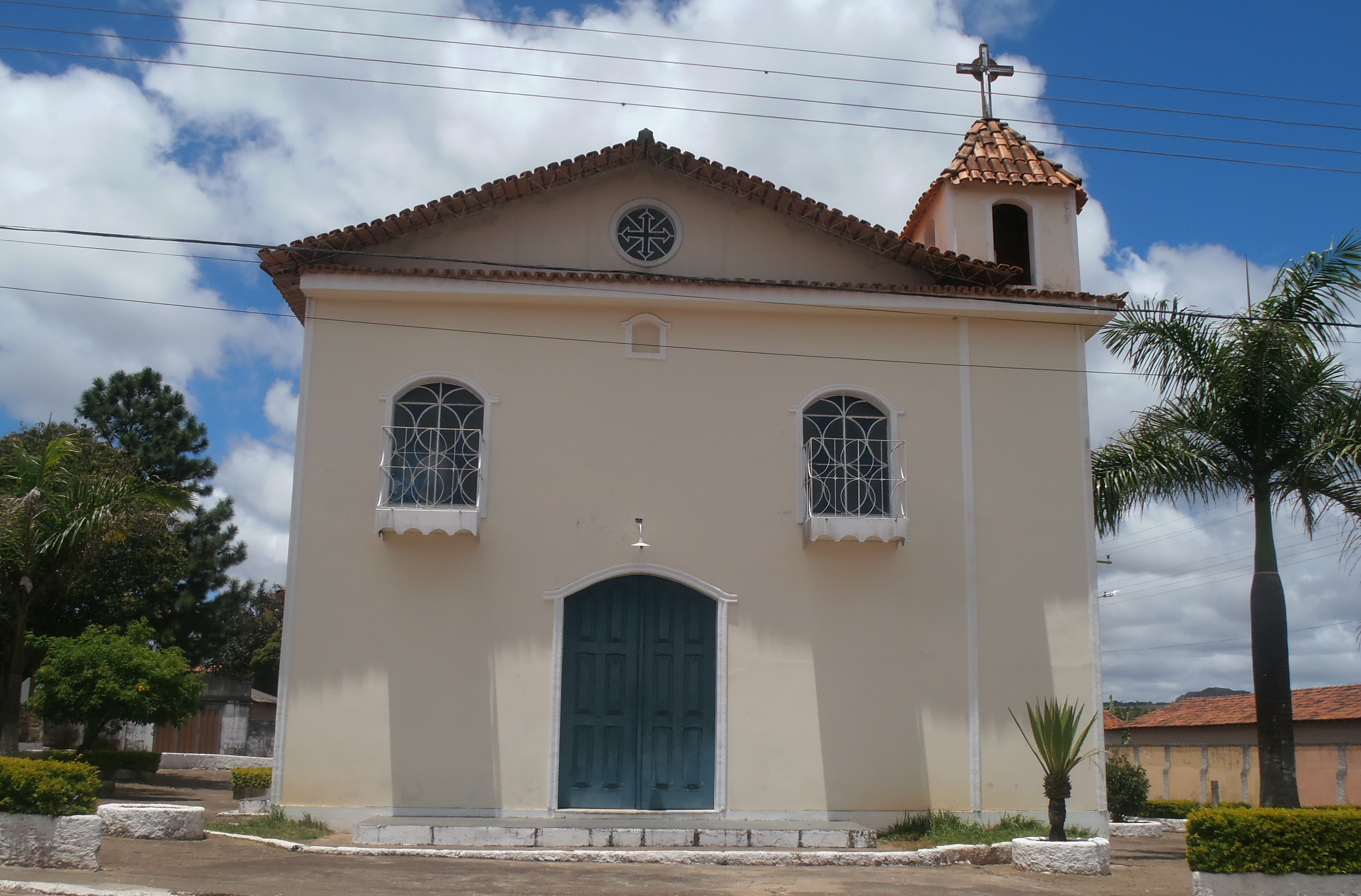
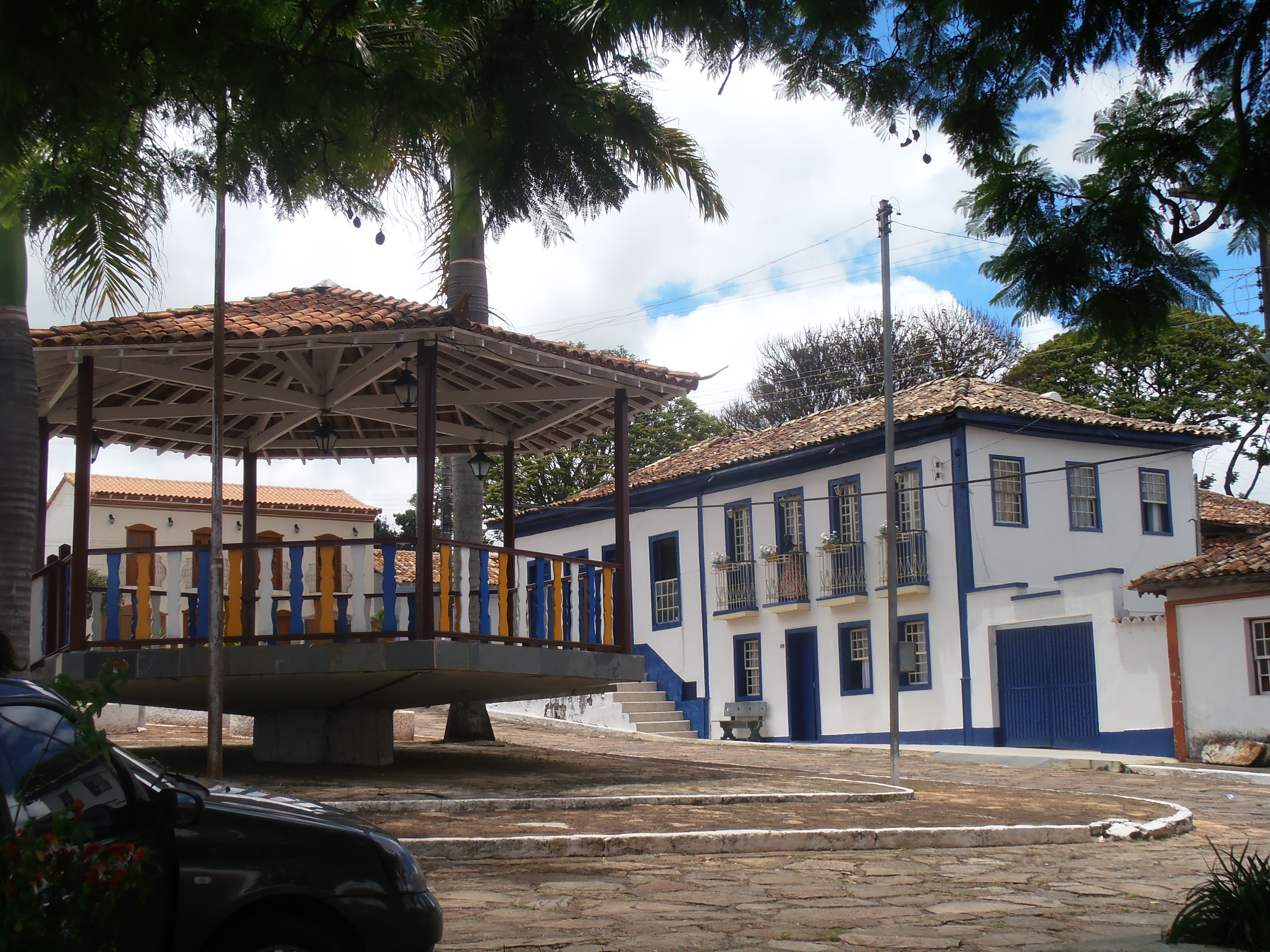
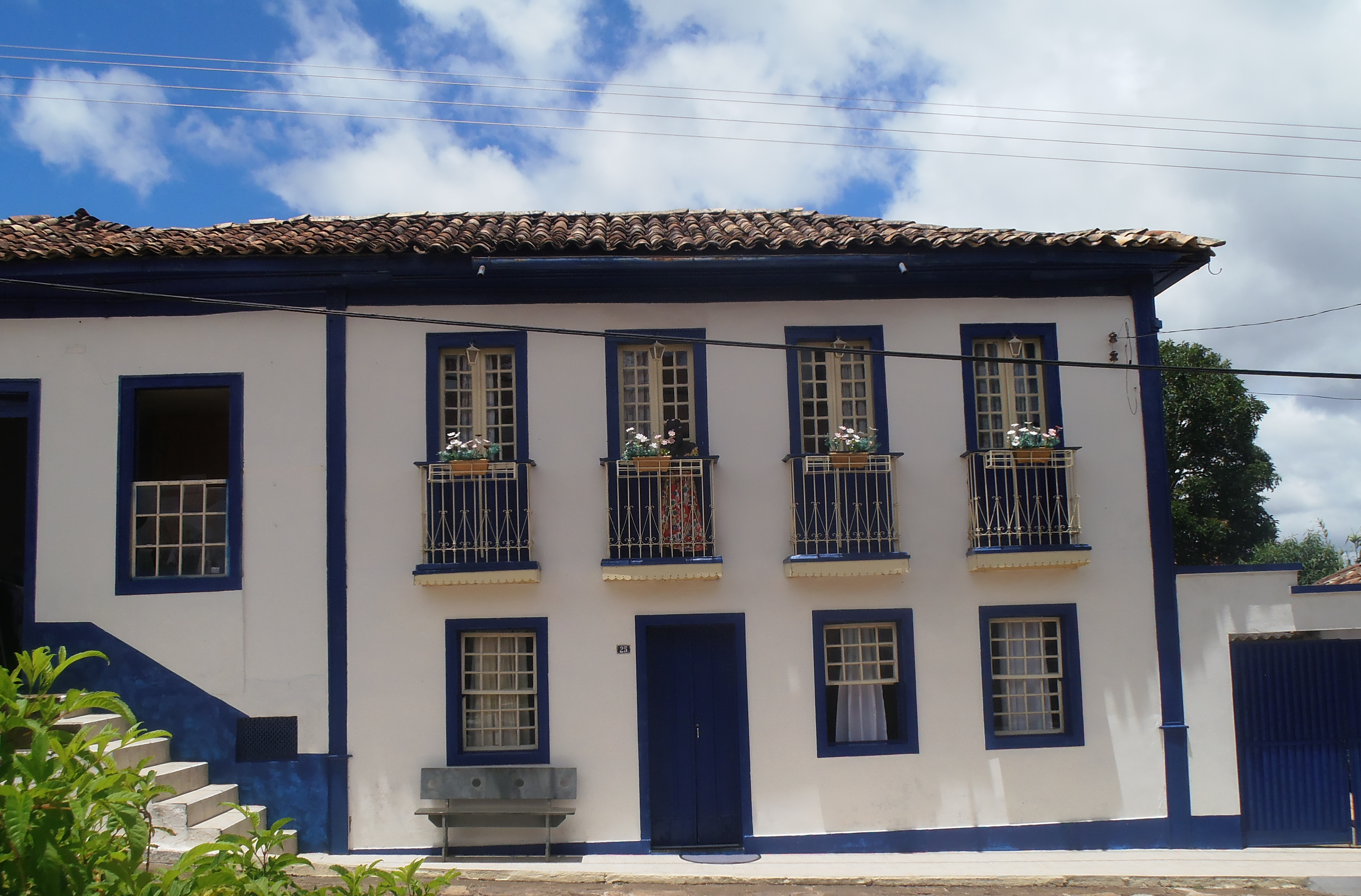
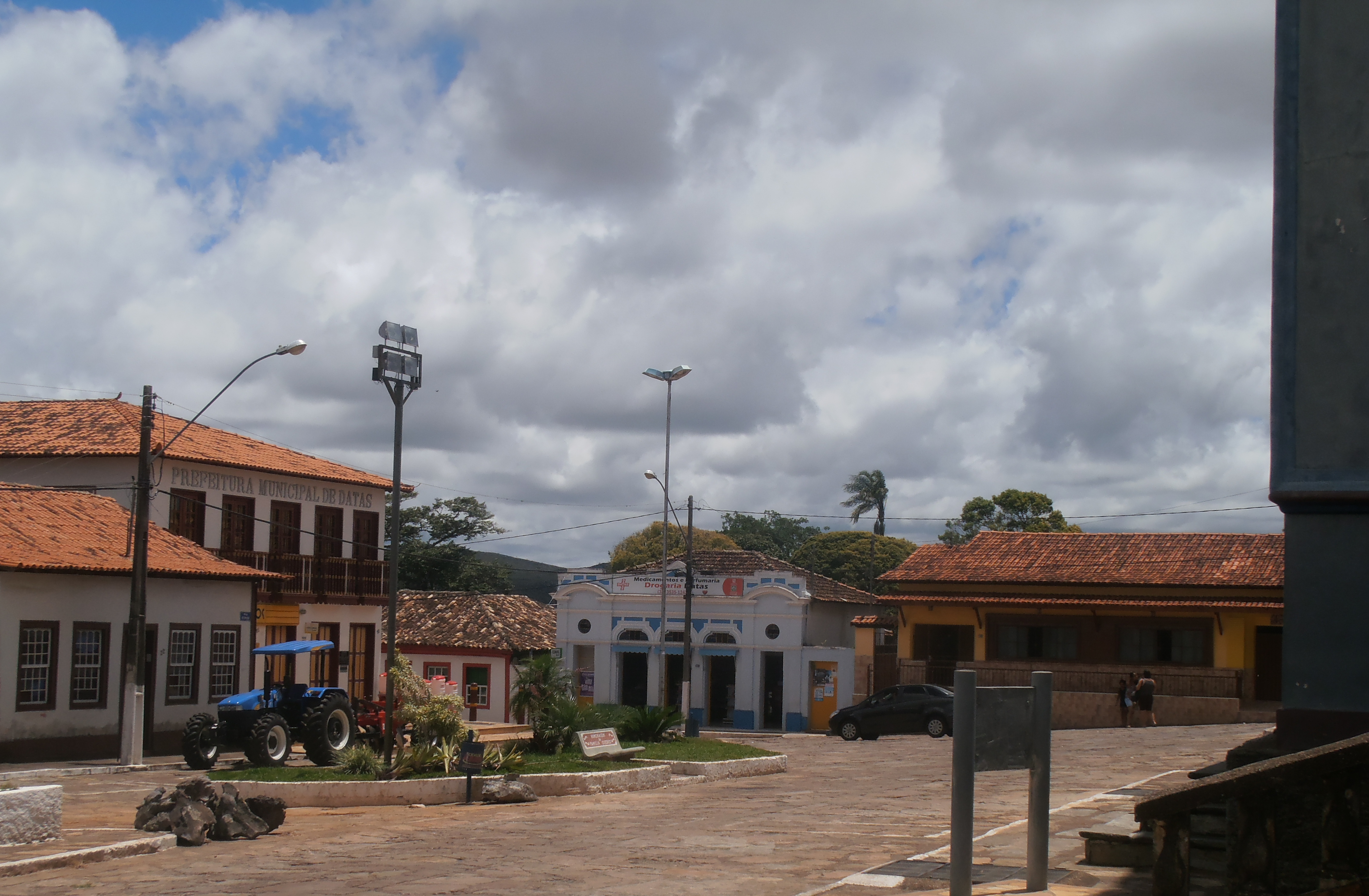

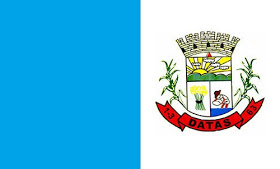
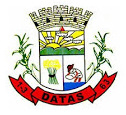
- Flag Coat of arms

- Location in Minas Gerais
- Country: Brazil
- State: Minas Gerais
- Region: Southeast
- Intermediate Region: Teófilo Otoni
- Immediate Region: Diamantina
- Founded: 30 December 1962

Government
  - Mayor: Narlisson de Jesus Martins (PSD)

Area
  - Total: 310.099 km^{2} (119.730 sq mi)
- Elevation: 1,197 m (3,927 ft)

Population (2021)
  - Total: 5,431
  - Density: 17.51/km^{2} (45.36/sq mi)
- Demonym: datense
- Time zone: UTC−3 (BRT)
- Postal Code: 39130-000 to 39134-999
- HDI (2010): 0.616 – medium
- Website: datas.mg.gov.br

Datas is a Brazilian municipality in the north-center of the state of Minas Gerais. Its population as of 2020 was 5,421 living in a total area of 309 km^{2}. The city belongs to the Immediate Geographic Region of Diamantina. It became a municipality in 1962.

== Geography ==
Datas is at an elevation of 1340 meters in the upper Jequitinhonha River valley. It is south of Diamantina to which it is connected by federal highway BR-367. The nearest major population center is Diamantina. The distance to Diamantina is 27 km; and the distance to Belo Horizonte is 272 km. Neighboring municipalities are: Diamantina (N); Santo Antônio do Itambé and Presidente Kubitschek (E); Conceição do Mato Dentro (S); and Gouveia (W).

== Economy ==
The main economic activities are services, and agriculture. The GDP in 2005 was R$13 million (US$5.34 million), with 10 million from services, 1 million from industry, and 1 million from agriculture. There were 442 rural producers on 10,000 hectares of land. Only 5 farms had tractors (2006). The main crops were sugarcane, beans, corn, and soybeans. There were 2,000 head of cattle (2006).

== Social indicators ==
The social indicators rank it in the bottom tier of municipalities in the state.

- Municipal Human Development Index: 0.694 (2000)
- State ranking: 572 out of 853 municipalities as of 2000
- National ranking: 3094 out of 5,138 municipalities as of 2000
- Literacy rate: 86%
- Life expectancy: 66 (average of males and females)
- Infant mortality: 24.39
- Percentage of houses in urban area connected to sewers: 93.20
- Degree of urbanization: 52.02%

In terms of HDI, the highest ranking municipality in Minas Gerais in 2000 was Poços de Caldas with 0.841, while the lowest was Setubinha with 0.568. Nationally the highest was São Caetano do Sul in São Paulo with 0.919, while the lowest was Setubinha. In more recent statistics (considering 5,507 municipalities) Manari in the state of Pernambuco has the lowest rating in the country—0.467—putting it in last place.

There were 7 health clinics and one small private hospital with 18 beds in 2005. Patients with more serious health conditions are transported to Diamantina. Educational needs were met by 7 primary schools and 2 middle schools.

== See also ==
- List of municipalities in Minas Gerais
