= Alvorada (disambiguation) =

Alvorada (sunrise in Portuguese) is a city in Rio Grande do Sul, Brazil. It may also refer to:

- Alvorada (film), a 1962 documentary film
- Alvorada, Tocantins, a Brazilian municipality
- Alvorada d'Oeste, a Brazilian municipality
- Alvorada de Minas, a Brazilian municipality
- Alvorada do Norte, Brazil municipality
- Palácio da Alvorada, a presidential palace
- Simca Alvorada, an automobile
- TV Alvorada (Floriano), a television station in Floriano, Piaui, Brazil
