= Presidente Kubitschek =

Human settlement in Brazil

Coordinates: 18°36′50″S 43°33′43″W

- Municipality
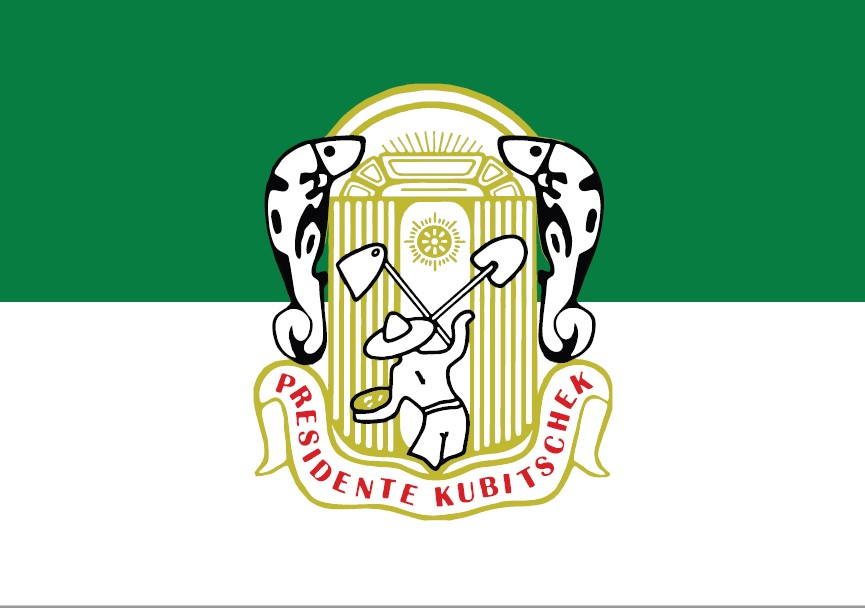
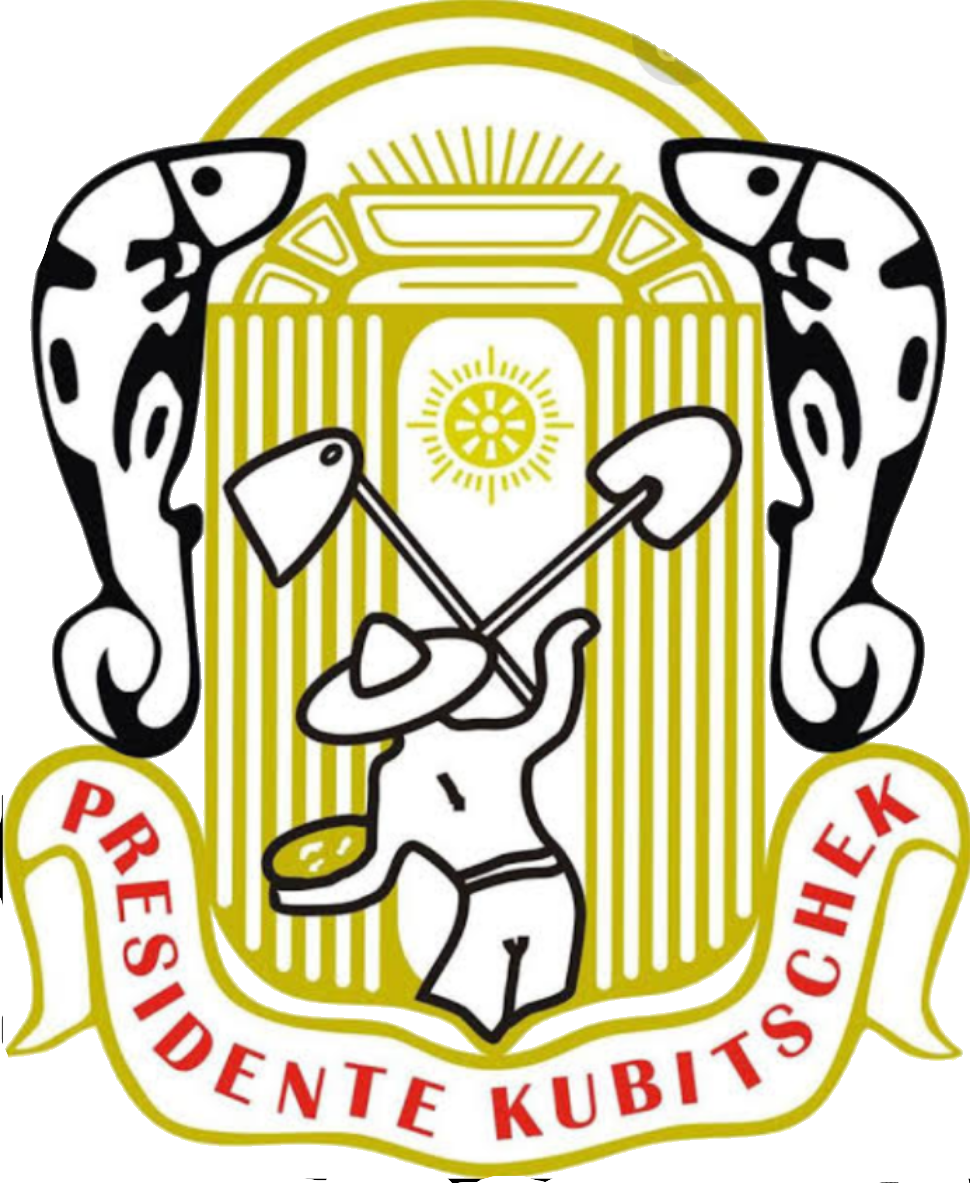
- Flag Coat of arms
- Interactive map of Presidente Kubitschek
- Country: Brazil
- State: Minas Gerais
- Region: Southeast
- Time zone: UTC−3 (BRT)

Location of Presidente Kubitschek in the state of Minas Gerais.

Presidente Kubitschek is a Brazilian municipality in the state of Minas Gerais. Its population as of 2020 was 3,001 living in a total area of 189 km^{2}. The city belongs to the statistical mesoregion of Jequitinhonha and to the statistical microregion of Diamantina. It became a municipality in 1962.

== Geography ==
The municipal seat of Presidente Kubitschek is located at an elevation of 1109 meters in the upper Jequitinhonha River valley. It is south of Diamantina to which it is connected by state highways MG-259 and federal highway BR-267. The nearest major population center is Diamantina.

The distance to Diamantina is 54 km; and the distance to Belo Horizonte is 298 km. Neighboring municipalities are: Datas, Santo Antônio do Itambé, Conceição do Mato Dentro and Gouveia.

== Economy ==
The main economic activities are services, and agriculture. The GDP in 2005 was R$8 million, with 6 million from services, 700 thousand from industry, and 1 million from agriculture. There were 118 rural producers on 3,000 hectares of land. Only 4 farms had tractors (2006). The main crops cultivated were tropical fruits, sugarcane, beans, and corn. There were 1,700 head of cattle (2006). In 2007 there were no banks in the town.

== Social indicators ==
Presidente Kubitschek is ranked in the bottom tier of municipalities in the state and country in human development.

- Municipal Human Development Index: 0.671 (2000)
- State ranking: 668 out of 853 municipalities as of 2000
- National ranking: 3443 out of 5,138 municipalities as of 2000
- Literacy rate: 81%
- Life expectancy: 66 (average of males and females)

The highest ranking municipality in Minas Gerais in 2000 was Poços de Caldas with 0.841, while the lowest was Setubinha with 0.568. Nationally the highest was São Caetano do Sul in São Paulo with 0.919, while the lowest was Setubinha. In more recent statistics (considering 5,507 municipalities) Manari in the state of Pernambuco has the lowest rating in the country—0,467—putting it in last place.

== Health and education ==
There were 2 health clinics in 2005. Patients with more serious health conditions are transported to Diamantina. Educational needs were met by 1 primary school (2007).

== History ==
The municipality takes its name from Juscelino Kubitschek, who served as the 21st President of Brazil from 1956 to 1961 and designed Brasília, the modern-day capital of Brazil and UNESCO World Heritage Site which replaced Rio de Janeiro and was officially inaugurated in 1960 and has been ever since.

== See also ==
- List of municipalities in Minas Gerais
