= José Vieira Couto de Magalhães =

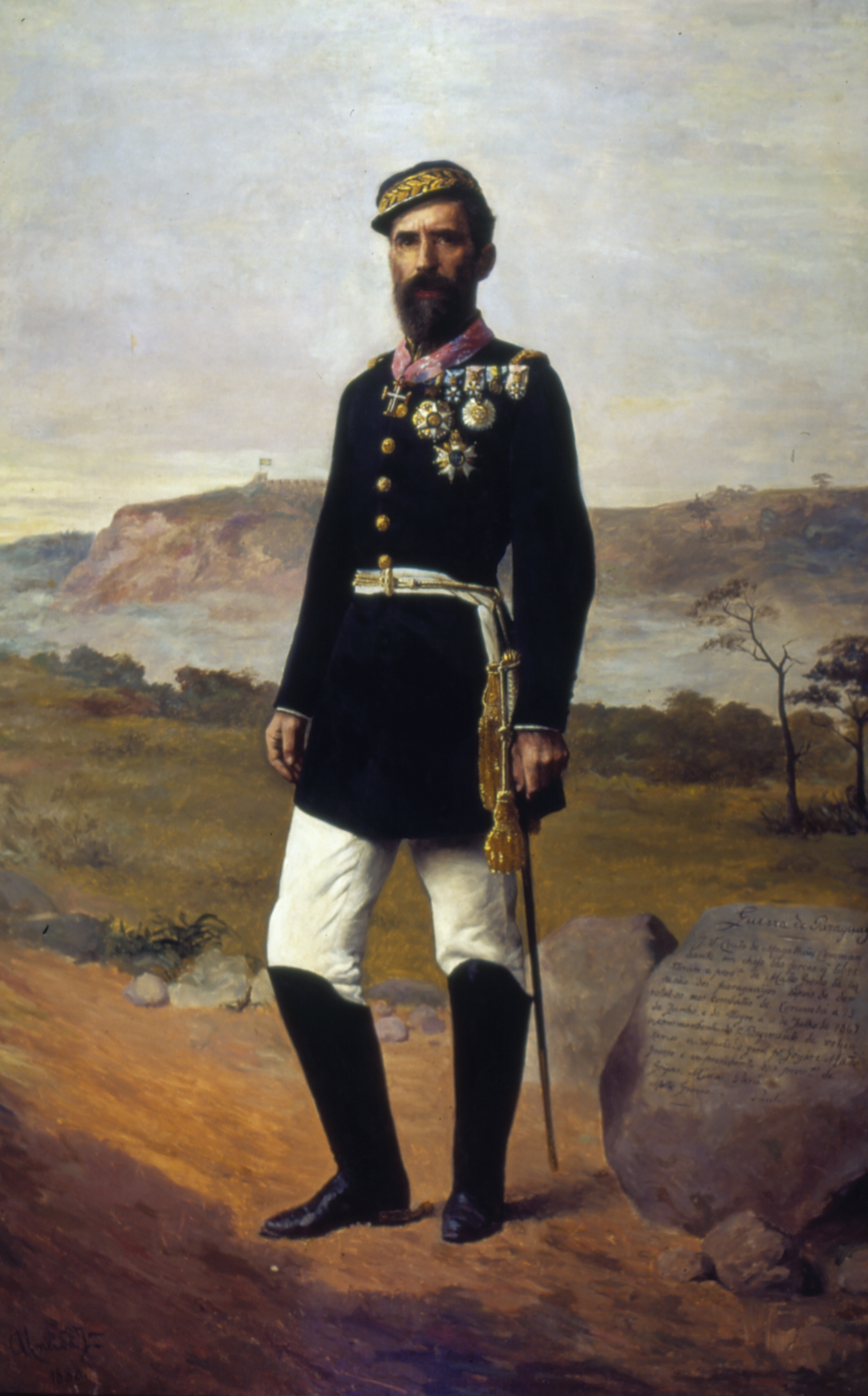
- Portrait by Almeida Júnior, 1888

President of São Paulo
- In office 10 June 1889 – 16 November 1889
- Preceded by: Antônio de Ulhoa Cintra
- Succeeded by: 1889 governative junta

President of Mato Grosso
- In office 2 February 1867 – 13 April 1868
- Preceded by: Albano de Sousa Osório
- Succeeded by: João Batista de Oliveira

President of Pará
- In office 29 July 1864 – 8 May 1866
- Preceded by: João Maria de Morais
- Succeeded by: Antônio Lacerda de Chermont

President of Goiás
- In office 8 January 1863 – 5 April 1864
- Preceded by: Bonifácio de Siqueira
- Succeeded by: Bonifácio de Siqueira

Personal details
- Born: 1 November 1837 Diamantina, Empire of Brazil
- Died: 14 September 1898 (aged 60) Rio de Janeiro, Brazil
- Occupation: Politician; military officer; writer

Military service
- Allegiance: Empire of Brazil
- Branch/service: Imperial Brazilian Army
- Rank: General
- Battles/wars: Paraguayan War

José Vieira Couto de Magalhães (1 November 1837 – 14 September 1898) was a Brazilian politician, military officer, writer and folklorist.

Magalhães began his studies at Mariana Seminar. He studied mathematics at the Military Academy of Rio de Janeiro and attended the course in Field Artillery in London. He graduated from in law at São Paulo Law School in 1859.

Couto de Magalhães knew the interior of Brazil and was the initiator of steam navigation in the Brazilian Highlands. He has advised the State and MP for Goiás and Mato Grosso. He was president of the provinces of Goiás (8 January 1863 – 5 April 1864); Pará (29 July 1864 – 8 May 1866); Mato Grosso (2 February 1867 – 13 April 1868) and São Paulo (10 June – 16 November 1889), term during which the republic was proclaimed. Arrested and sent to Rio de Janeiro, Magalhães was released in recognition of his huge culture and actions of society for clearing the Brazilian backlands.

Magalhães spoke French, English, German, Italian, Tupi and numerous indigenous dialects. he was the one who started the folklore studies in Brazil, publishing O Selvagem (The Wild) (1876) and Testes de antropologia (Anthropology testing) (1894), among others.

He founded in 1885 the first astronomical observatory in the state of São Paulo, at his farm in Great Bridge on the River Tietê.

Couto de Magalhães is the patron in the following academies of letters:

- chair 31 of Academia Tocantinense de Letras;
- chair 19 of Academia Matogrossense de Letras;
- chair 11 of Academia Sul-matogrossense de Letras.

The cities of Couto de Magalhães de Minas in Minas Gerais and Couto de Magalhães in Tocantins are named after him.
