= Crossodactylodes septentrionalis =

Conservation status
- Vulnerable (IUCN 3.1)

Scientific classification
- Kingdom: Animalia
- Phylum: Chordata
- Class: Amphibia
- Order: Anura
- Family: Leptodactylidae
- Genus: Crossodactylodes
- Species: C. septentrionalis

Binomial name
- Crossodactylodes septentrionalis Teixeira, Recoder, Amaro, Damasceno, Cassimiro, and Rodrigues, 2013

Species of frog

Crossodactylodes septentrionalis is a species of frog in the family Leptodactylidae. It lives in Brazil.

== Description ==
The adult frog measures about 17 mm in snout-vent length. The frog's skin is orange-brown in color with cream-white lines on the sides and a brown mark on the back shaped like the letter X. There are white spots on the back. The upper surfaces of the legs are orange in color. The ventrum is light in color. The iris of the eye is red in color.

== Etymology ==
Scientists named this frog septentrionalis, which is Latin for "of the north." C. septentrionalis lives further north than any other frog in Crossodactylodes.

== Habitat ==
This arboreal frog lives in epiphytic bromeliads. Scientists have only reported this frog in Vriesea dictyographa. Scientists observed adult frogs, froglets, and tadpoles co-habitating in the same plants.

Scientists know the frog from its type locality: Peito de Moça peak, about 930 meters above sea level. This area is in a protected park: Parque Nacional Serra das Lontras.

== Threats ==
The IUCN classifies this frog as vulnerable to extinction. It is known in a protected park, where further habitat loss is unlikely. The biggest threat to this frog is climate change and resulting alterations in precipitation and humidity.
