= Diamantina Airport =

Juscelino Kubitschek Airport Aeroporto Juscelino Kubitschek
- IATA: DTI; ICAO: SNDT; LID: MG0030

Summary
- Airport type: Public
- Serves: Diamantina
- Time zone: BRT (UTC−03:00)
- Elevation AMSL: 1,356 m (4,449 ft)
- Coordinates: 18°13′56″S 043°39′01″W

Map
- Location in Brazil DTI (Brazil)

Runways
Direction	Length		Surface
Direction	m	ft	Surface
03/21	1,700	5,577	Asphalt
- Sources: ANAC, DECEA

Juscelino Kubitschek Airport (IATA: DTI, ICAO: SNDT) is the airport serving Diamantina, Brazil.

== History ==
On March 7, 2012, because of safety concerns, the National Civil Aviation Agency of Brazil (ANAC) imposed operational restrictions related to scheduled flights on the airport until irregularities are solved. General aviation operations were not affected.

== Airlines and destinations ==
Airlines	Destinations
Azul Conecta	Belo Horizonte–Confins

== Access ==
The airport is located 4 km (2 mi) from downtown Diamantina.

== See also ==
- List of airports in Brazil
