= Crossodactylodes izecksohni =

Conservation status
- Endangered (IUCN 3.1)

Scientific classification
- Kingdom: Animalia
- Phylum: Chordata
- Class: Amphibia
- Order: Anura
- Family: Leptodactylidae
- Genus: Crossodactylodes
- Species: C. izecksohni

Binomial name
- Crossodactylodes izecksohni Peixoto, 1983

Species of frog

Crossodactylodes izecksohni (common name: Izecksohn's bromeliad frog) is a species of frog in the family Leptodactylidae. It is endemic to Santa Teresa in Espírito Santo state of eastern Brazil.

== Etymology ==
The specific name izecksohni honours Eugênio Izecksohn, a Brazilian herpetologist.

== Habitat ==
This frog spends most of its time in terrestrial and bromeliad plants in primary rainforest but not secondary rainforest. The adult frogs are active at night. Scientists observed these frogs between 680 and 993 meters above sea level

About half of these frogs live in two protected parks: Reserva Biologica Augusto Ruschi and Estação Biológica de Santa Lúcia.

== Reproduction ==
This frog breeds year-round. Both male and female adult frogs have been reported caring for eggs and tadpoles. The tadpoles forage for food during the day and at night.

== Threats ==
The IUCN classifies this frog as endangered. Threats include habitat loss in favor of agriculture, silviculture, and livestock grazing areas.
