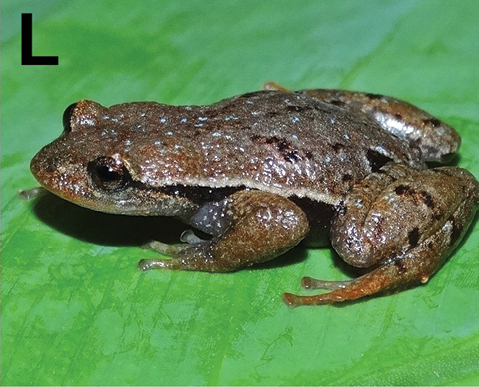
- C. bokermanni

Scientific classification
- Kingdom: Animalia
- Phylum: Chordata
- Class: Amphibia
- Order: Anura
- Family: Leptodactylidae
- Subfamily: Paratelmatobiinae
- Genus: Crossodactylodes; Cochran, 1938

Type species
- Crossodactylodes pintoi Cochran, 1938

Species
- 5, see text.

= Crossodactylodes =

Genus of amphibians

Crossodactylodes (common name: bromeliad frogs) is a genus of leptodactylid frogs from the Atlantic Forest of eastern Brazil.

Most Crossodactylodes are Atlantic Forest species closely associated with epiphytic bromeliads where they complete their entire life cycle, including the larval development. However, Crossodactylodes itambe inhabits rupicolous (rock-dwelling) bromeliads in open field habitats at higher altitudes.

== Species ==
There are five species:

- Crossodactylodes bokermanni Peixoto, 1983
- Crossodactylodes itambe Barata, Santos, Leite, and Garcias, 2013
- Crossodactylodes izecksohni Peixoto, 1983
- Crossodactylodes pintoi Cochran, 1938
- Crossodactylodes septentrionalis Teixeira, Recoder, Amaro, Damasceno, Cassimiro, and Rodrigues, 2013
