= Felício dos Santos =

Human settlement in Brazil

Coordinates: 18°04′37″S 43°14′49″W

- Municipality
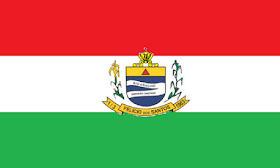
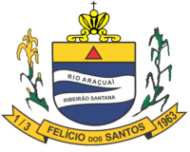
- Flag Coat of arms
- Interactive map of Felício dos Santos
- Country: Brazil
- State: Minas Gerais
- Region: Southeast
- Time zone: UTC−3 (BRT)

Location of Felício dos Santos in the state of Minas Gerais, Brazil

Felício dos Santos is a Brazilian municipality located in the center-north of the state of Minas Gerais. Its population as of 2020 was 4,704 living in a total area of 358 km^{2} (138 sq mi). The city belongs to the statistical mesoregion of Jequitinhonha and to the statistical microregion of Diamantina. It became a municipality in 1962.

== Geography ==
Felício dos Santos is located at an elevation of 750 meters in the upper Jequitinhonha River valley. It is northeast of Diamantina to which it is connected by state highways MG-317 and MG-214 and by federal highway BR-367. The nearest major population center is Diamantina.

The distance to Diamantina is 80 km; and the distance to Belo Horizonte is 366 km. Neighboring municipalities are: Senador Modestino Gonçalves (N); Rio Vermelho (E) and (S); São Gonçalo do Rio Preto and Couto de Magalhães de Minas (W).

== Economy ==
The main economic activities are services, and agriculture. The GDP in 2005 was R$15 million (US$6.16 million), with 10 million from services, 1 million from industry, and 3 million from agriculture. There were 734 rural producers on 11,000 hectares of land. Only 6 farms had tractors (2006). The main crops were coffee, sugarcane, beans, and corn. There were 4,300 head of cattle (2006).

== Social indicators ==
The social indicators rank it in the bottom tier of municipalities in the state.

- Municipal Human Development Index: 0.657 (2000)
- State ranking: 722 out of 853 municipalities as of 2000
- National ranking: 3663 out of 5,138 municipalities as of 2000
- Literacy rate: 76%
- Life expectancy: 67 (average of males and females)

The highest ranking municipality in Minas Gerais in 2000 was Poços de Caldas with 0.841, while the lowest was Setubinha with 0.568. Nationally the highest was São Caetano do Sul in São Paulo with 0.919, while the lowest was Setubinha. In more recent statistics (considering 5,507 municipalities) Manari in the state of Pernambuco has the lowest rating in the country—0,467—putting it in last place.

== Health and education ==
There was 1 health clinic in 2005. Patients with more serious health conditions are transported to Diamantina. Educational needs were met by 12 primary schools and 2 middle schools.

== See also ==
- List of municipalities in Minas Gerais
