= Waltillia =

Scientific classification
- Kingdom: Plantae
- Clade: Tracheophytes
- Clade: Angiosperms
- Clade: Monocots
- Clade: Commelinids
- Order: Poales
- Family: Bromeliaceae
- Subfamily: Tillandsioideae
- Genus: Waltillia; Leme, Barfuss & Halbritt.

Species
- Waltillia hatschbachii; Waltillia itambana

Genus of flowering plants

Waltillia is a genus of flowering plants belonging to the family Bromeliaceae. It was considered to be a monotypic genus until the 2021 description of W. itambana.

Its native range is Minas Gerais, Brazil. Although, Waltillia itambana is believed to be restricted to Pico do Itambé State Park.

== Species ==
There are currently two described species:

- Waltillia hatschbachii (L.B.Sm. & Read) Leme, Barfuss & Halbritt.
- Waltillia itambana T. Machado & Versieux

== Taxonomy ==
The genus name of Waltillia is in honour of Walter Till (b. 1956), an Austrian botanist and herbarium director in Vienna. It was first described and published in Phytotaxa Vol.299 (Issue 1) on page 29 in 2017.
