= Federal University of Vales do Jequitinhonha e Mucuri =

University in Brazil

Coordinates: 17.8832°S 41.4974°W

- Universidade Federal dos Vales do Jequitinhonha e Mucuri
- Other names: UFVJM
- Motto: Sapientia Et Libertas (Latin)
- Motto in English: Wisdom and Freedom
- Type: Public university
- Established: 1953
- Location: Diamantina, in the state of Minas Gerais, Brazil
- Website: UFVJM.edu.br
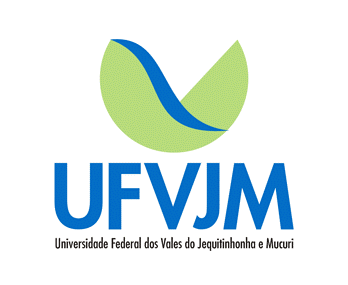

The Federal University of Vales do Jequitinhonha e Mucuri (Portuguese: Universidade Federal dos Vales do Jequitinhonha e Mucuri, UFVJM) is a public university in Diamantina, Minas Gerais, Brazil, established on September 30, 1953, as the Faculdade de Odontologia de Diamantina (Portuguese: Dentistry Faculty of Diamantina). It was promoted to a university in 2005, after the passing of federal law n° 11.173.

== History ==
=== Foundation ===
The Faculdade de Odontologia de Diamantina was founded on September 30, 1953, by then Governor of Minas Gerais Juscelino Kubitschek, looking to advance the development of the region. It was designed by Oscar Niemeyer, who had not yet achieved international fame at the time.

== See also ==
- List of federal universities of Brazil
