= Crossodactylodes pintoi =

Conservation status
- Data Deficient (IUCN 3.1)

Scientific classification
- Kingdom: Animalia
- Phylum: Chordata
- Class: Amphibia
- Order: Anura
- Family: Leptodactylidae
- Genus: Crossodactylodes
- Species: C. pintoi

Binomial name
- Crossodactylodes pintoi Cochran, 1938

Species of amphibian

Crossodactylodes pintoi (common name: brown bromeliad frog) is a species of frog in the family Leptodactylidae. It is endemic to Rio de Janeiro and Espírito Santo states of southeastern Brazil.

== Habitat ==
Scientists do not know the details of this frog's habits, but they believe it lives in bromeliad plants, like other frogs in Crossodactylodes. Scientists observed the frog 1200 meters above sea level.

== Threats ==
The IUCN classifies this frog as data deficient. Possible threats include habitat loss from forest conversion to farmland, logging, and tourism infrastructure. People also harvest the bromeliad plants.
