= Crossodactylodes bokermanni =

Conservation status
- Least Concern (IUCN 3.1)

Scientific classification
- Kingdom: Animalia
- Phylum: Chordata
- Class: Amphibia
- Order: Anura
- Family: Leptodactylidae
- Genus: Crossodactylodes
- Species: C. bokermanni

Binomial name
- Crossodactylodes bokermanni Peixoto, 1983

Species of frog

Crossodactylodes bokermanni (common names: Bokermann's bromeliad frog, Bokermann's stream froglet) is a species of frog in the family Leptodactylidae. It is endemic to Espírito Santo state of eastern Brazil.

== Habitat ==
This arboreal frog lives in rainforests on hills and mountains. It lives in tree-growing and terrestrial bromeliad plants. Scientists saw the frog between 500 and 1500 meters above sea level.

Scientists have reported the frog in three protected places: Reserva Biologica Augusto Ruschi, Estação Biológica de Santa Lúcia, and Parque Estadual do Forno Grande.

== Reproduction ==
The female frogs lay eggs, one per clutch, on the bromeliad leaves, above or below the waterline. The frog's tadpoles develop in the water in the bromeliad plants.

== Threats ==
The IUCN classifies this frog as least concern of extinction. During the past hundred years, human beings converted the forests to farms and livestock grazing areas. Today, large tracts of forests remain, and they are not subject to much further depletion.
