= Pico do Itambé State Park =

State park in the state of Minas Gerais, Brazil

- Parque Estadual do Pico do Itambé
- IUCN category II (national park)
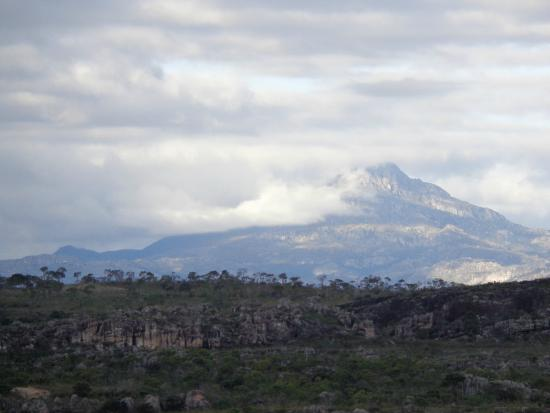
- Pico do Itambé

- Location within Brazil
- Nearest city: Santo Antônio do Itambé, Minas Gerais
- Coordinates: 18.398482°S 43.348829°W
- Area: 4,696 hectares (11,600 acres)
- Designation: State park
- Created: 21 January 1998
- Administrator: Instituto Estadual de Florestas

The Pico do Itambé State Park (Portuguese: Parque Estadual do Pico do Itambé) is a state park in the state of Minas Gerais, Brazil. It protects one of the higher peaks in the state.

== Location ==
The Pico do Itambé State Park is divided between the municipalities of Santo Antônio do Itambé, Serro and Serra Azul de Minas in Minas Gerais. It has an area of 4,696 hectares (11,600 acres). (Note: The State Forestry Institute gives the area as 4,696 hectares (11,600 acres). Other sources give the area as 6,520 hectares (16,100 acres).) It is 357 kilometres (222 mi) from Belo Horizonte. The word "Itambé" is of indigenous origin and means "sharp stone". The park protects the Serra do Espinhaço, a mountain range. The highest peak is the 2,002 metres (6,568 ft) Pico do Itambé, a major landmark of the state. It contains various springs and headwaters of the Jequitinhonha and Doce rivers.

== History ==
The Pico do Itambé State Park was created by decree 39.398 of 21 January 1998. It is administered by the Instituto Estadual de Florestas of Minas Gerais. The park became part of the Espinhaço Mosaic of conservation units, created in 2010.

== Environment ==
The park has a typical tropical climate with a dry season from June to August and a rainy season from November to March. The highest parts of the Serra do Espinhaço have mild temperatures year round, with an annual average of about 18 °C (64 °F). The vegetation includes high rocky fields and cerrado, with luxuriant rainforest in the valley floors.

The park is in the transition between the Atlantic Forest and cerrado biomes. It includes rupestrian vegetation, grasslands, cerrado and seasonal forest. Flora include Anadenanthera colubrina, Copaifera langsdorffii , Dalbergia nigra, Handroanthus albus, Eremanthus erythropappus, Trattinnickia burseraefolia, Calophyllum brasiliense, Byrsonima crassifolia, Vellozia squamata and various species endemic to the region. A new bromeliad was discovered in the rocky cliffs of the Fumaça waterfall in 2007, named Orthophytum itambense. In 2021 a new bromeliad, Waltillia itambana, was found to be endemic to the park.

There is a varied fauna, including southern tamandua (Tamandua tetradactyla), maned wolf (Chrysocyon brachyurus), ocelot (Leopardus pardalis), cougar (Puma concolor) and Coimbra Filho's titi (Callicebus coimbrai). In 2011 a new species of amphibian was discovered in the park (Crossodactylodes itambe).

== Tourism ==
The park is part of the Diamonds and Royal Road tourist circuit. The best time to visit is in the dry season from April to October as between November and March the trails may be closed on rainy days.

The Waterfalls trail leads to four waterfalls, the furthest of which is the Rio Vermelho, 2.8 kilometres (1.7 mi) from the main road. The Água Santa waterfall has two drops, of 7 and 30 metres (23 and 98 ft). The Fumaça waterfall has a 20 metres (66 ft) drop. The Neném waterfall has a drop of 8 metres (26 ft). The Rio Vermelho waterfall is 36 metres (118 ft) high. The Tropeiros trail is part of a historical route used by merchants travelling between Santo Antônio do Itambé e Capivari. It is 12 kilometres (7.5 mi) long, but easy walking. Guides are recommended but not required. The Mountains and Valleys trail leads to the Pico do Itambé, and is more physically demanding. Authorization is required to take the Tropeiros trail or visit the Pico do Itambé.

== Sources ==
- "Parque Estadual do Pico do Itambé", Descubra Minas (in Portuguese), SENAC MINAS: Serviço Nacional de Aprendizagem Comercial – Minas Gerais
- Parque Estadual Pico do Itambé (in Portuguese), ER: Instituto Estrada Real
- Parque Estadual do Pico do Itambé (in Portuguese), IEF: Instituto Estadual de Florestas, archived from the original on 2019-03-27
- "Parque Estadual do Pico do Itambé", Viagem (in Portuguese), Abril Mídia S A.
- Teixeira, Izabella (26 November 2010), Portaria no- 444, de 26 de Novembro de 2010 (PDF) (in Portuguese), archived from the original (PDF) on 2017-02-02
