= São Gonçalo do Rio Preto =

Human settlement in Brazil

Coordinates: 18°00′14″S 43°23′27″W

- Municipality
- Interactive map of São Gonçalo do Rio Preto
- Country: Brazil
- State: Minas Gerais
- Region: Southeast
- Time zone: UTC−3 (BRT)

Location of São Gonçalo do Rio Preto in the state of Minas Gerais.

São Gonçalo do Rio Preto is a Brazilian municipality in the state of Minas Gerais. Its population as of 2020 was 3,173 living in a total area of 313 km^{2}.

== Geography ==
The city belongs to the statistical mesoregion of Jequitinhonha and to the statistical microregion of Diamantina. It became a municipality on December 30, 1962, was renamed to actual name in 1986 in honor of Gundisalvus of Amarante, before it was called Felisberto Caldeira.

The municipal seat of São Gonçalo do Rio Preto is located at an elevation of 742 meters in the upper Jequitinhonha River valley. It is southeast of Diamantina to which it is connected by secondary highways. The nearest major population center is Diamantina. The distance to Diamantina is 24 km; and the distance to Belo Horizonte is 345 km. Neighboring municipalities are: Diamantina, Senador Modestino Gonçalves, Felício dos Santos and Couto de Magalhães de Minas.

The municipality contains the 12,184 hectares (30,110 acres) Rio Preto State Park, created in 1994.

== Economy ==
The main economic activities are services, and agriculture. The GDP in 2005 was R$10 million, with 7 million from services, 800 thousand from industry, and 1 million from agriculture. There were 182 rural producers on 3,600 hectares of land. Only 5 farms had tractors (2006). The main crops cultivated were tropical fruits, sugarcane, beans, and corn. There were 3,000 head of cattle (2006). In 2007 there were no banks in the town.

== Social indices ==
São Gonçalo do Rio Preto is ranked in the bottom tier of municipalities in the state and country in human development.

- Municipal Human Development Index: 0.635 (2000)
- State ranking: 778 out of 853 municipalities as of 2000
- National ranking: 4023 out of 5,138 municipalities as of 2000
- Literacy rate: 74%
- Life expectancy: 59 (average of males and females)

The highest ranking municipality in Minas Gerais in 2000 was Poços de Caldas with 0.841, while the lowest was Setubinha with 0.568. Nationally the highest was São Caetano do Sul in São Paulo with 0.919, while the lowest was Setubinha. In more recent statistics (considering 5,507 municipalities) Manari in the state of Pernambuco has the lowest rating in the country—0,467—putting it in last place.

== Health and education ==
There was 1 health clinic in 2005. Patients with more serious health conditions are transported to Diamantina. Educational needs were met by 2 primary schools and 1 middle school (2007).

== See also ==
- List of municipalities in Minas Gerais
