= Senador Modestino Gonçalves =

Coordinates: 17°56′49″S 43°13′30″W

- Municipality
- Location of Senador Modestino Gonçalves in the state of Minas Gerais

- Location within Brazil
- Country: Brazil
- State: Minas Gerais.

Area
  - Total: 951 km^{2} (367 sq mi)
- Elevation: 743 m (2,438 ft)

Population (2020)
  - Total: 4,105
  - Density: 4.32/km^{2} (11.2/sq mi)
- Time zone: UTC−3 (BRT)

Senador Modestino Gonçalves is a Brazilian municipality in the state of Minas Gerais.

== Geography ==
Its population as of 2020 was 4,105 living in a total area of 951 square kilometres (367 sq mi). The city belongs to the statistical mesoregion of Jequitinhonha and to the statistical microregion of Diamantina. It became a municipality in 1962.

The municipal seat of Senador Modestino Gonçalves is located at an elevation of 743 meters in the upper Jequitinhonha River valley. It is northeast of Diamantina to which it is connected by secondary highways. The nearest major population center is Itamarandiba, which had 31,000 inhabitants in 2007.

The distance to Itamarandiba is 48 km; and the distance to Belo Horizonte is 373 km. Neighboring municipalities are: Diamantina - Felício dos Santos - Carbonita - Itamarandiba and São Gonçalo do Rio Preto.

The municipality contains the 498 hectares (1,230 acres) Mata dos Ausentes Ecological Station, a fully protected conservation unit in the Jequitinhonha River valley.

== Economy ==
The main economic activities are services, and agriculture. The GDP in 2005 was R$16 million, with 10 million from services, 2 million from industry, and 3 million from agriculture. There were 632 rural producers on 27,000 hectares of land. Only 14 farms had tractors (2006). The main crops cultivated were coffee, urucum, sugarcane, beans, and corn. There were 7,000 head of cattle (2006). In 2007 there was 1 bank in the town.

== Development indicators ==
Modestino Gonçalves is ranked in the bottom tier of municipalities in the state and country in human development. It is one of the poorest municipalities in Minas Gerais.

- Municipal Human Development Index: 0.626 (2000)
- State ranking: 794 out of 853 municipalities as of 2000
- National ranking: 4197 out of 5,138 municipalities as of 2000
- Literacy rate: 71%
- Life expectancy: 63 (average of males and females)

== Health and education ==
There was one health clinic in 2005. Patients with more serious health conditions are transported to Diamantina or to Itamarandiba. Educational needs were met by 21 primary schools and one middle school (2007).

== See also ==
- List of municipalities in Minas Gerais
