= Serra Azul de Minas =

Brazilian municipality

Coordinates: 18°21′43″S 43°10′12″W

- Municipality
- Interactive map of Serra Azul de Minas
- Country: Brazil
- State: Minas Gerais
- Region: Southeast
- Time zone: UTC−3 (BRT)

Location of Serra Azul de Minas within Minas Gerais

Serra Azul de Minas is a Brazilian municipality located in the state of Minas Gerais. The city belongs to the mesoregion Metropolitana de Belo Horizonte and to the microregion of Conceição do Mato Dentro. As of 2020, the estimated population was 4,292.

The municipality contains part of the 4,696 hectares (11,600 acres) Pico do Itambé State Park, created in 1998.

== See also ==
- List of municipalities in Minas Gerais
