= Crossodactylodes itambe =

Conservation status
- Critically Endangered (IUCN 3.1)

Scientific classification
- Kingdom: Animalia
- Phylum: Chordata
- Class: Amphibia
- Order: Anura
- Family: Leptodactylidae
- Genus: Crossodactylodes
- Species: C. itambe

Binomial name
- Crossodactylodes itambe Barata, Santos, Leite, and Garcia, 2013

Species of frog

Crossodactylodes itambe, or Itambe's bromeliad frog, is a species of frog in the family Leptodactylidae. It is endemic to Brazil.

== Description ==
The adult male frog measures about 14.0 - 17.6 mm in snout-vent length and the adult female frog is 13.5 - 18.0 mm long. It has a flat body and granular skin. There is no webbed skin on any of its feet. The skin is brown in color, and it can change from dark brown during the day to light brown with darker marks at night. Some frogs have white spots or rectangles on the back and legs.

== Habitat ==
This frog lives in bromeliad plants that grow on rocks. Scientists have only seen the frog in Vriesea medusa bromeliads. Scientists observed the frog between 1713 and 2062 meters above sea level. While scientists reported adult frogs in plants lower down on the hills, they only found tadpoles at high elevations.

Scientists found the frog in a protected park: Parque Estadual do Pico do Itambé.

== Reproduction ==
Vriesea medusa can hold a large amount of water. The male frog sits only partially submerged and calls to the female frogs. The female frog lays her eggs on the leaves of the bromeliad. The tadpoles develop in the water. There are one to eight tadpoles per plant.

== Threats ==
The IUCN classifies this frog as critically endangered. Most of its known population lives in a protected park, so it is not subject to much further habitat loss from forest conversion. However, hikers, campers, and other tourists can trample its habitat. Human beings also set fires and collect bromeliad plants for human use. Climate change poses another significant threat because it could change the precipitation. Should the frogs climb higher seeking cooler climates, they might not find suitable habitat.

== Original description ==
- Barata IM; Santos MTT; Leite FSF; Garcia PCA (2013). "A new species of Crossodactylodes (Anura: Leptodactylidae) from Minas Gerais, Brazil: first record of genus within the Espinhaco Mountain Range". Zootaxa. 3731: 552–560.
