= Alvorada de Minas =

Municipality of Brazil

Coordinates: 18°44′09″S 43°21′54″W

- Municipality
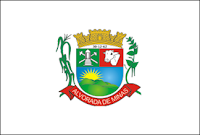
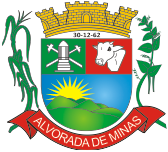
- Flag Coat of arms

- Location in Minas Gerais

- Location in Brazil
- Country: Brazil
- Region: Southeast
- State: Minas Gerais
- Intermediate Geographic Region: Teófilo Otoni
- Immediate Geographic Region: Diamantina

Area
  - Total: 374.008 km^{2} (144.405 sq mi)

Population (2022)
  - Total: 4,159
  - Density: 11.12/km^{2} (28.8/sq mi)
- Demonym: alvoradense
- Time zone: UTC−3 (BRT)
- Website: alvoradademinas.mg.gov.br

Alvorada de Minas is a Brazilian municipality in the state of Minas Gerais. As of 2020 its population is estimated to be 3,605. The city belongs to the Immediate Geographic Region of Diamantina.

== See also ==
- List of municipalities in Minas Gerais
