= Couto de Magalhães de Minas =

Municipality in the state of Minas Gerais, Brazil

Coordinates: 18°04′24″S 43°28′16″W

- Municipality
- Municipality of Couto de Magalhães de Minas
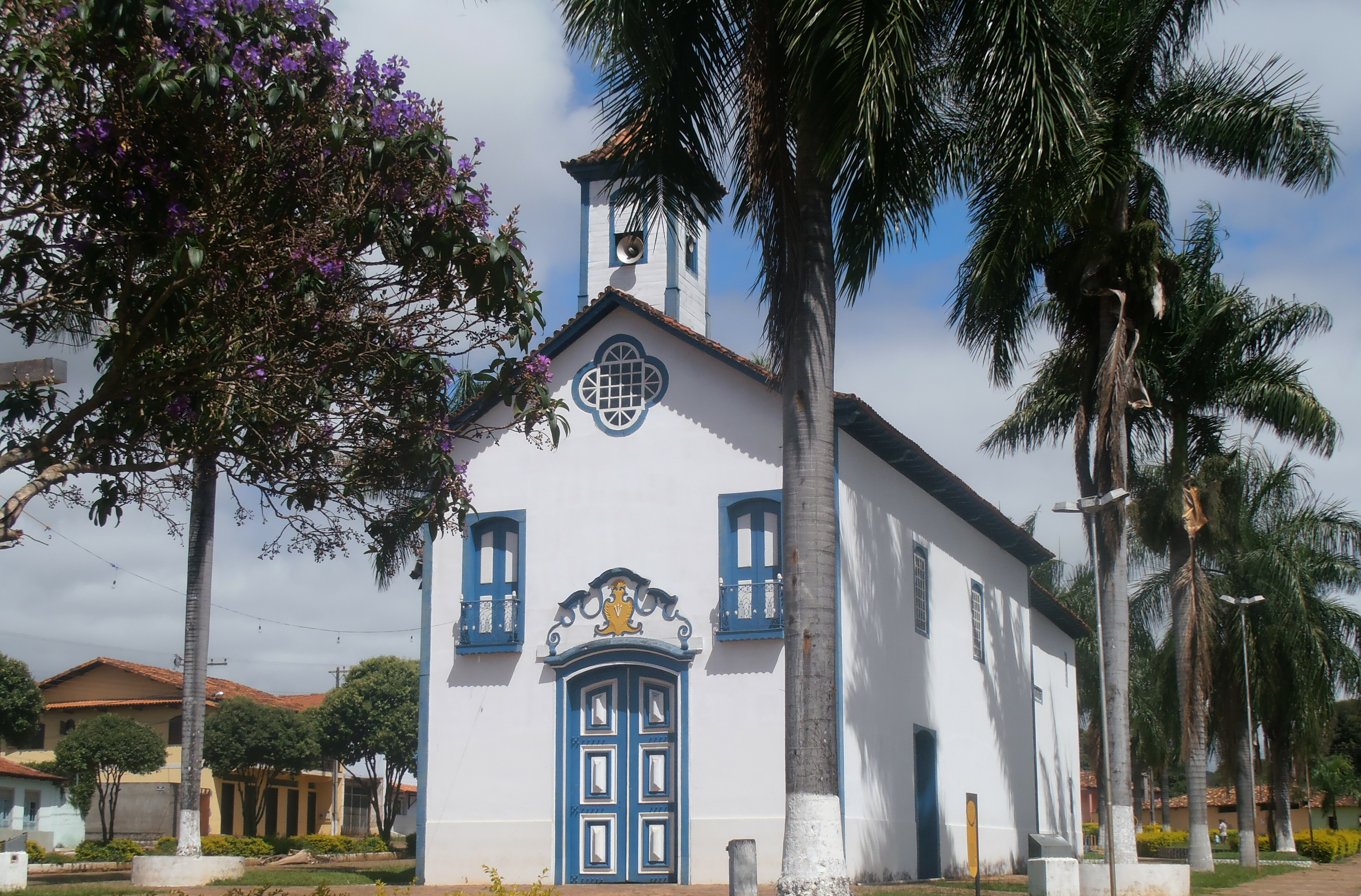

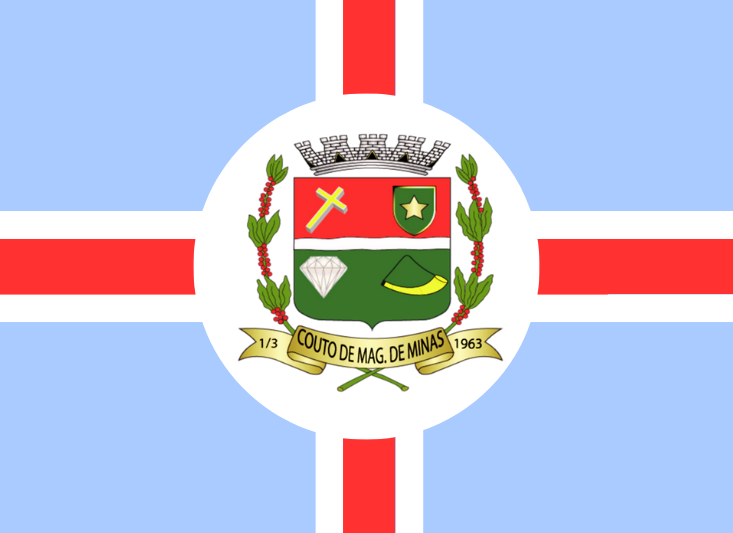
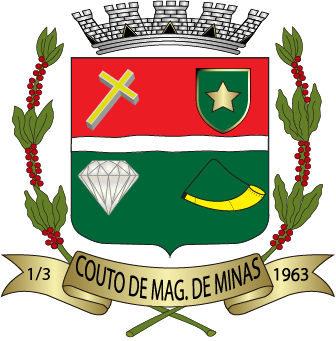
- Flag Coat of arms

- Location in Minas Gerais
- Country: Brazil
- State: Minas Gerais
- Region: Southeast
- Intermediate Region: Teófilo Otoni
- Immediate Region: Diamantina
- Founded: 1 March 1963

Government
  - Mayor: José Eduardo De Paula Rabelo (PODE)

Area
  - Total: 485.654 km^{2} (187.512 sq mi)
- Elevation: 733 m (2,405 ft)

Population (2021)
  - Total: 4,436
  - Density: 9.134/km^{2} (23.66/sq mi)
- Demonym: couto-magalhense
- Time zone: UTC−3 (BRT)
- Postal Code: 39188-000 to 39189-999
- HDI (2010): 0.659 – medium
- Website: coutodemagalhaesdeminas.mg.gov.br

Couto de Magalhães de Minas is a Brazilian municipality located in the north-center of the state of Minas Gerais. Its population as of 2020 was 4,423 living in a total area of 484 km^{2} (187 sq mi). The city belongs to the Immediate Geographic Region of Diamantina. It became a municipality in 1963.

== Geography ==
Couto de Magalhães de Minas is located at an elevation of 1155 meters in the upper Jequitinhonha River valley. It is northeast of Diamantina to which it is connected by federal highway BR-367. The distance to Diamantina is 39 km; and the distance to Belo Horizonte, the state capital, is 320 km. Neighboring municipalities are: Diamantina (N) and (W); Santo Antônio do Itambé (S) and São Gonçalo do Rio Preto (E).

== Economy ==
The main economic activities are services, agriculture, and small industries. The GDP in 2005 was R$18 million (US$7.39 million), with 11 million from services, 4 million from industry, and 1 million from agriculture. There were 126 rural producers on 14,000 hectares of land. Only 9 farms had tractors (2006). The main crops were sugarcane, beans, corn, and soybeans. There were 2,000 head of cattle (2006).

== Social indicators ==
The social indicators rank it in the middle tier of municipalities in the state.

- Municipal Human Development Index: 0.712 (2000)
- State ranking: 488 out of 853 municipalities as of 2000
- National ranking: 2769 out of 5,138 municipalities as of 2000
- Literacy rate: 83%
- Life expectancy: 69 (average of males and females)

The highest ranking municipality in Minas Gerais in 2000 in terms of HDI was Poços de Caldas with 0.841, while the lowest was Setubinha with 0.568. Nationally the highest was São Caetano do Sul in São Paulo with 0.919, while the lowest was Setubinha. In more recent statistics (considering 5,507 municipalities) Manari in the state of Pernambuco has the lowest rating in the country—0.467—putting it in last place.

There was one health clinic in 2005. Patients with more serious health conditions are transported to Diamantina. Educational needs were met by 5 primary schools and 2 middle schools.

== See also ==
- List of municipalities in Minas Gerais
