= Gouveia, Minas Gerais =

Human settlement in Brazil

Coordinates: 18°27′14″S 43°44′27″W

- Municipality
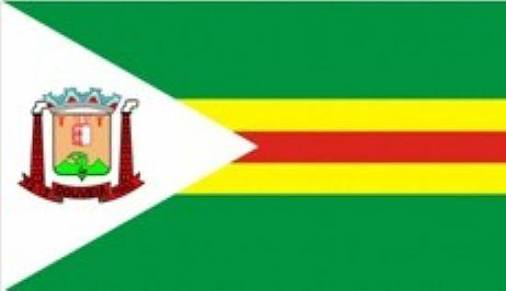
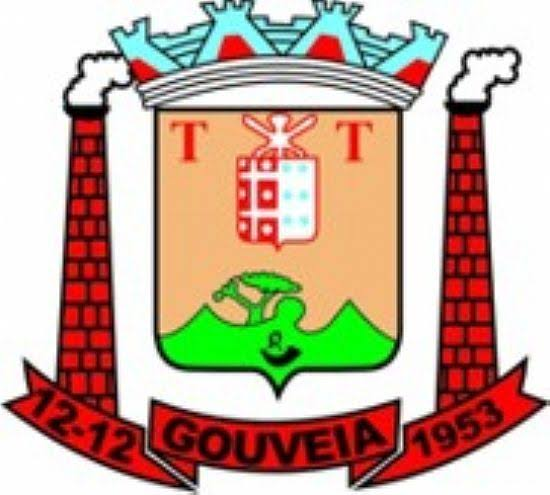
- Flag Coat of arms
- Interactive map of Gouveia, Minas Gerais
- Country: Brazil
- State: Minas Gerais
- Region: Southeast
- Time zone: UTC−3 (BRT)

Location of Gouveia in the state of Minas Gerais, Brazil

Gouveia is a Brazilian municipality located in the center of the state of Minas Gerais. Its population as of 2020 was 11,818 living in a total area of 874 km^{2}. The city belongs to the statistical mesoregion of Jequitinhonha and to the statistical microregion of Diamantina. It became a municipality in 1953.

Gouveia is located at an elevation of 1113 meters in the upper Jequitinhonha River valley. It is southwest of Diamantina to which it is connected by federal highway BR-367. The nearest major population center is Diamantina.

The distance to Diamantina is 34 km; and the distance to Belo Horizonte is 252 km. Neighboring municipalities are: Diamantina (N); Datas (E); Conceição do Mato Dentro and Santana de Pirapama (S); Presidente Juscelino and Monjolos (W).

The main economic activities are services, small industry, and agriculture. The GDP in 2005 was R$51 million, with 29 million from services, 13 million from industry, and 3 million from agriculture. There were 323 rural producers on 18,000 hectares of land. Only 16 farms had tractors (2006). The main crops cultivated were coffee, sugarcane, beans, and corn. There were 9,400 head of cattle (2006). In 2007 there was 1 bank in the town.

The social indicators rank Gouveia in the middle tier of municipalities in the state in human development.

- Municipal Human Development Index: 0.735 (2000)
- State ranking: 383 out of 853 municipalities as of 2000
- National ranking: 2292 out of 5,138 municipalities as of 2000
- Literacy rate: 87%
- Life expectancy: 71 (average of males and females)

The highest ranking municipality in Minas Gerais in 2000 was Poços de Caldas with 0.841, while the lowest was Setubinha with 0.568. Nationally the highest was São Caetano do Sul in São Paulo with 0.919, while the lowest was Setubinha. In more recent statistics (considering 5,507 municipalities) Manari in the state of Pernambuco has the lowest rating in the country—0,467—putting it in last place.

There were 10 health clinics and 1 small hospital with 41 beds in 2005. Patients with more serious health conditions are transported to Diamantina. Educational needs were met by 11 primary schools and 1 middle school (2007).

Churches:

- Church of Nossa Senhora das Dores: Date of the 18th century. Built by slaves on top of a large block of granite, it had been built entirely of stone. In it is the image of Nossa Senhora das Dores, which belonged to Chica da Silva. It is at the highest point within the urban perimeter.
- Church of Nossa Senhora de Lourdes: It is in the São Roberto neighborhood, where the Fábrica São Roberto is located. Built in the 1930s, it is simple but of great beauty.
- Church of São Geraldo's: Built in the 1990s, in honor of the Italian saint, it is located in the São Lucas neighborhood.
- Church of São Sebastião: Completed in 2009, in honor of the martyr São Sebastião, it is located in the Serrinha neighborhood, next to the São Miguel Cemetery.

Cultural Heritage:

- Melo's Waterfall
- Capivara's Waterfall
- Barro Preto's Waterfall
- Santo Antônio's Waterfall
- São Roberto's Waterfall
- Barão's Waterfall
- Morro do Camilinho, where is located the first Wind Power station built in Latin American, but nowadays doesn't work anymore.

== See also ==
- List of municipalities in Minas Gerais
