= Santo Antônio do Itambé =

- Municipality
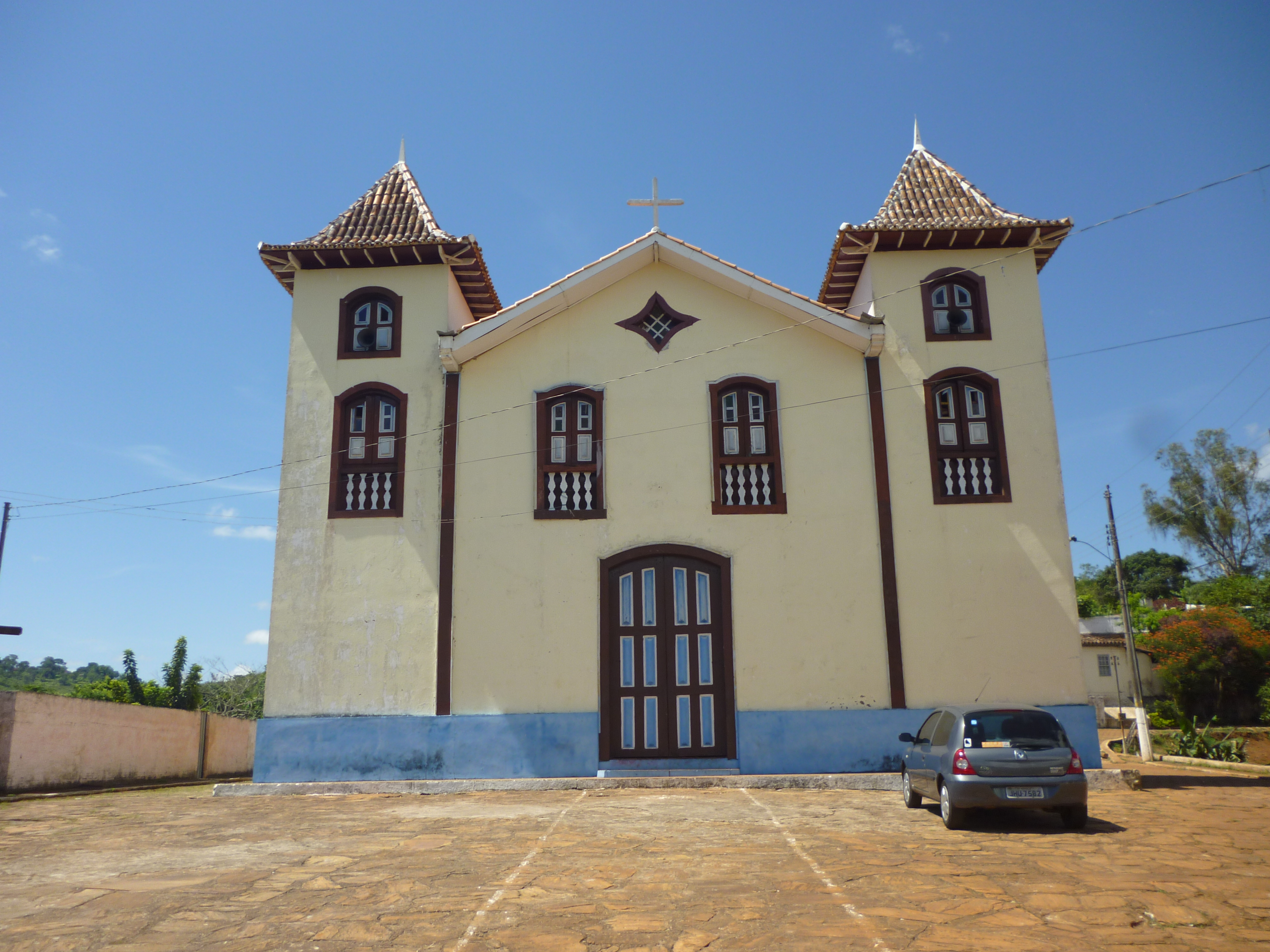
- Church of Saint Anthony, Santo Antônio do Itambé

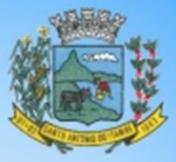
- Coat of arms

- Location in Minas Gerais state

- Location in Brazil
- Coordinates: 18°27′57″S 43°18′25″W
- Country: Brazil
- Region: Southeast
- State: Minas Gerais
- Mesoregion: Metropolitana de Belo Horizonte
- Established: December 30, 1962

Government
  - Mayor: Ronam Sales (PDT)

Area
  - Total: 305.74 km^{2} (118.05 sq mi)

Population (2020)
  - Total: 3,799
  - Density: 12.43/km^{2} (32.18/sq mi)
- Time zone: UTC−3 (BRT)
- Postal code: 39160-000
- Area code: 33

Santo Antônio do Itambé is a municipality in the state of Minas Gerais, Brazil. The population is 3,799 (2020 est.) in an area of 305.74 km^{2} (118.05 sq mi).

The municipality contains part of the 4,696-hectare (11,600-acre) Pico do Itambé State Park, created in 1998.

== See also ==
- List of municipalities in Minas Gerais
